= 1901 Nelson City Council election =

Local election in New Zealand

- 24 April 1901
- Turnout: 1,477 (74.56%)
- Mayoral election
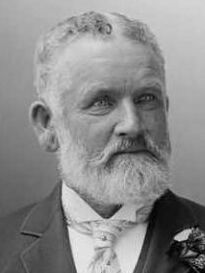

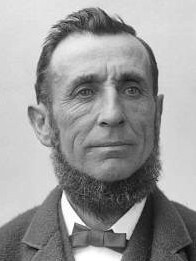
Candidate	Henry Baigent	Francis Trask
Party	Independent	Independent
Popular vote	802	664
Percentage	54.30	44.96
Mayor before election
Joseph Auty Harley
Independent
Elected mayor
Henry Baigent
Independent
- Council election
- 12 seats on the Nelson City Council; 7 seats needed for a majority
Party	Seats	+/–
Citizens	7	
Independents	4	
This lists parties that won seats. See the complete results below.

The 1901 Nelson City Council election was a local election held on 24 April in Nelson, New Zealand, as part of that year's nation-wide local elections. Voters elected the mayor of Nelson for a one-year term and 12 city councillors for a two-year term. In person voting and the first-past-the-post voting system were used.

== Candidates ==
=== Nelson Citizens' Union ===
The Nelson Citizens' Union endorsed James Boon, Thomas Fathers, Randolph St Cyr Gray, James Hudson, John Hunter, John Charles Mercer, Thomas Roberts, and Edward Webley.

== Results ==
=== Mayor ===
Henry Baigant defeated Francis Trask to win the mayoral election.

Affiliation	Candidate	Votes	%
Independent	Henry Baigent	802	54.30
Independent	Francis Trask	664	44.96
Informal		11	0.74
Turnout		1,477	74.56
Registered		1,981	

By polling station
Polling station	Baigent	Trask	Informal	Total
Council chambers	470	440	8	918
Theatre	256	150	2	408
Port	76	74	1	151
Total	802	664	11	1,477

=== Council ===
The results of the election were:

Affiliation	Candidate	Votes	%
Citizens	John Hunter	1,234	83.55
Citizens	Thomas Roberts	1,146	77.59
Independent	Frederick William Fairey	1,139	77.12
Citizens	James Hudson	1,102	74.61
Citizens	James Boon	931	63.03
Independent	William Akersten	926	62.69
Citizens	John Charles Mercer	832	56.33
Independent	Jesse Piper	811	54.91
Independent	John Alexander Ormsman	790	53.49
Citizens	Thomas Fathers	776	52.54
Citizens	Randolph St Cyr Gray	775	52.47
Citizens	Edward Webley	757	51.25
Independent	Thomas Pettit	590	39.95
Independent	Joshua Shields	507	34.33
Independent	Claude Pettigrew Graham	403	27.29
Independent	George Marshall	362	24.51
Informal		55	3.72
Turnout		1,477	74.56
Registered		1,981	
