= 1901 New Zealand local elections =

- 24 April 1901

The 1901 New Zealand local elections were local elections that were held on 24 April 1901 to elect local government officials across the Colony of New Zealand.

They were the first elections held under the changes made to local governance and elections that came about following the passage of the Municipal Corporations Act 1900.

== Background ==
These elections were the first held under the changes made to local governance and elections in boroughs that came about following the passage of the Municipal Corporations Act 1900; mayoral elections would be held every year, whilst councillors would face election every two years. The Town Districts Act 1881 still governed town district elections, which were held every two years. The Counties Act 1876 still governed county elections, which were held every three years.

== Elections ==
=== Cities ===
The city councils governed the major urban municipalities that had been elevated to city status.

==== Councils ====
City	Electoral System	Seats	Councillors		Turnout	Details	Sources
City	Electoral System	Seats	Incumbent	Elected	Turnout	Details	Sources
Auckland	FPP	15	18 missing info	9 Liberal–Labour; 5 Independents; 1 Independent Liberal	4,441 (44.12%)	Details	
Wellington	FPP	12	? missing info	6 Ratepayers / Progressive; 3 Progressive; 2 Ratepayers; 1 Independent Labour / Progressive	8,533 (82.24%)	Details	
Nelson	FPP	12	? missing info	7 Citizens; 4 Independents	1,477 (74.56%)	Details	
Christchurch	FPP	12	? missing info	12 Independents		Details	
Dunedin	FPP	12	? missing info	12 Independents	4,878 (70.46%)	Details	
All 5 city councils		63					

==== Mayors ====
City	Incumbent	Elected	Runner-up	Details	Sources
Auckland	David Goldie (Ind)	John Logan Campbell (Ind)	Daniel Arkell (Ind)	Details	
Wellington	John Aitken (Ind)		Thomas Wilford (Ind)	Details	
Nelson	Joseph Auty Harley (Ind)	Henry Baigent (Ind)	Francis Trask (Ind)	Details	
Christchurch	William Reece (Ind)	Arthur Rhodes (Ind)	unopposed	Details	
Dunedin	Robert Chisholm (Ind)	George Lyon Denniston (Ind)	William Dawson (Ind)	Details	

=== Boroughs ===
The borough councils governed the mid-sized municipalities of the country. There were 96 non-city boroughs in 1901.

==== Councils ====
Borough	Electoral System	Seats	Councillors		Turnout	Details	Sources
Borough	Electoral System	Seats	Incumbent	Elected	Turnout	Details	Sources
Whangarei	FPP	?	? missing info	? missing info			
Birkenhead	FPP	?	? missing info	? missing info			
Devonport	FPP	?	? missing info	? missing info			
Grey Lynn	FPP	?	? missing info	? missing info			
Newmarket	FPP	?	? missing info	? missing info			
Parnell	FPP	?	? missing info	? missing info			
Onehunga	FPP	?	? missing info	? missing info			
Thames	FPP	?	? missing info	? missing info			
Te Aroha	FPP	?	? missing info	? missing info			
Hamilton	FPP	?	? missing info	? missing info			
Cambridge	FPP	?	? missing info	? missing info			
Tauranga	FPP	?	? missing info	? missing info			
Gisborne	FPP	?	? missing info	? missing info			
New Plymouth	FPP	?	? missing info	? missing info			
Stratford	FPP	?	? missing info	? missing info			
Hawera	FPP	?	? missing info	? missing info			
Patea	FPP	?	? missing info	? missing info			
Wanganui	FPP	?	? missing info	? missing info			
Marton	FPP	?	? missing info	? missing info			
Feilding	FPP	?	? missing info	? missing info			
Palmerston North	FPP	?	? missing info	? missing info			
Foxton	FPP	?	? missing info	? missing info			
Hastings	FPP	9	6 missing info	9 Independents	1,162 (71.20%)	Details	
Napier	FPP	12	9 missing info	5 Electors; 3 Progressive Liberal / Electors; 2 Independents; 1 Progressive Liberal; 1 Conservative	2,477	Details	
Dannevirke	FPP	?	? missing info	? missing info			
Woodville	FPP	?	? missing info	? missing info			
Pahiatua	FPP	?	? missing info	? missing info			
Masterton	FPP	?	? missing info	? missing info			
Carterton	FPP	?	? missing info	? missing info			
Greytown	FPP	?	? missing info	? missing info			
Lower Hutt	FPP	9	9 Independents	9 Independents			
Petone	FPP	?	? missing info	? missing info			
Onslow	FPP	6	6 Independents	6 Independents			
Karori	FPP	9	9 Independents	9 Independents			
Melrose	FPP	9	9 Independents	9 Independents			
Picton	FPP	?	? missing info	? missing info			
Blenheim	FPP	?	? missing info	? missing info			
Richmond	FPP	?	? missing info	? missing info			
Motueka	FPP	?	? missing info	? missing info			
Westport	FPP	?	? missing info	? missing info			
Greymouth	FPP	?	? missing info	? missing info			
Brunner	FPP	?	? missing info	? missing info			
Kumara	FPP	?	? missing info	? missing info			
Hokitika	FPP	?	? missing info	? missing info			
Ross	FPP	?	? missing info	? missing info			
Rangiora	FPP	?	? missing info	? missing info			
Kaiapoi	FPP	?	? missing info	? missing info			
Linwood	FPP	?	? missing info	? missing info			
St Albans	FPP	?	? missing info	? missing info			
Sydenham	FPP	?	? missing info	? missing info			
Woolston	FPP	?	? missing info	? missing info			
Sumner	FPP	?	? missing info	? missing info			
New Brighton	FPP	?	? missing info	? missing info			
Lyttelton	FPP	?	? missing info	? missing info			
Akaroa	FPP	?	? missing info	? missing info			
Ashburton	FPP	?	? missing info	? missing info			
Temuka	FPP	?	? missing info	? missing info			
Timaru	FPP	?	? missing info	? missing info			
Waimate	FPP	?	? missing info	? missing info			
Oamaru	FPP	?	? missing info	? missing info			
Hampden	FPP	?	? missing info	? missing info			
Palmerston South	FPP	?	? missing info	? missing info			
Hawksbury	FPP	?	? missing info	? missing info			
Port Chalmers	FPP	?	? missing info	? missing info			
North East Valley	FPP	?	? missing info	? missing info			
Maori Hill	FPP	?	? missing info	? missing info			
West Harbour	FPP	?	? missing info	? missing info			
Roslyn	FPP	?	? missing info	? missing info			
Mornington	FPP	?	? missing info	? missing info			
Caversham	FPP	?	? missing info	? missing info			
St Kilda	FPP	?	? missing info	? missing info			
South Dunedin	FPP	?	? missing info	? missing info			
Green Island	FPP	?	? missing info	? missing info			
Mosgiel	FPP	?	? missing info	? missing info			
Milton	FPP	?	? missing info	? missing info			
Kaitangata	FPP	?	? missing info	? missing info			
Balclutha	FPP	?	? missing info	? missing info			
Lawrence	FPP	?	? missing info	? missing info			
Roxburgh	FPP	?	? missing info	? missing info			
Tapanui	FPP	?	? missing info	? missing info			
Naseby	FPP	?	? missing info	? missing info			
Cromwell	FPP	?	? missing info	? missing info			
Alexandra	FPP	?	? missing info	? missing info			
Arrowtown	FPP	?	? missing info	? missing info			
Queenstown	FPP	?	? missing info	? missing info			
Gore	FPP	?	? missing info	? missing info			
Mataura	FPP	?	? missing info	? missing info			
Winton	FPP	?	? missing info	? missing info			
Invercargill	FPP	12	? missing info	12 Independents	1,791 (72.64%)	Details	
North Invercargill	FPP	?	? missing info	? missing info			
South Invercargill	FPP	?	? missing info	? missing info			
East Invercargill	FPP	?	? missing info	? missing info			
Avenal	FPP	?	? missing info	? missing info			
Gladstone	FPP	?	? missing info	? missing info			
Campbelltown	FPP	?	? missing info	? missing info			
Riverton	FPP	?	? missing info	? missing info			
All 96 borough councils (excluding cities)		?					

==== Mayors ====
Borough	Incumbent	Elected	Runner-up	Details	Sources
Whangarei	William Corns (Ind)	James Miller Killen (Ind)	William Corns (Ind)		
Birkenhead	Joseph Witheford (Ind)		unopposed		
Devonport	Joseph Macky (Ind)	Malcolm Niccol (Ind)	unopposed		
Grey Lynn	Richard T. Warnock (Ind)		John W. Shackleford (Ind)		
Newmarket	John McColl (Ind)		unopposed		
Parnell	Hugh Campbell (Ind)		unopposed		
Onehunga	Robert Close Erson (Ind)	Donald Sutherland (Ind)	Elizabeth Yates (Ind)		
Thames	Francis Trembath (Ind)		Samuel Hetherington (Ind)		
Te Aroha	Edward Gallagher (Ind)	Walter Henry Wright (Ind)	Samuel Hirst (Ind)		
Hamilton	George Edgecumbe (Ind)	Robert William Dyer (Ind)	unopposed		
Cambridge	Frank Buckland (Ind)		unopposed		
Tauranga	Charles Jordan (Ind)		unopposed		
Gisborne	John Townley (Ind)		unopposed		
New Plymouth	Edward Dockrill (Ind)		Richard Cock (Ind)		
Stratford	Reginald Brooking Tatton (Ind)		unopposed		
Hawera	Charles E. Major (Ind)		Benjamin Robbins (Ind)		
Patea	Herbert Onslow Clarke (Ind)		unopposed		
Wanganui	Alexander Hatrick (Ind)		William Bassett (Ind)		
Marton	Reginald Howard Beckett (Ind)	John James McDonald (Ind)	Edward Read (Ind)		
Feilding	Edmund Goodbehere (Ind)		James Jarvis Bagnall (Ind)		
Palmerston North	Henry Haydon (Ind)	George Snelson (Ind)	William Park (Ind)		
Foxton	missing info (Ind)	missing info (Ind)	missing info (Ind)		
Hastings	William Dennett (Ind)		Cecil Fitzroy (Ind)	Details	
Napier	George Swan (Ind)	John McVay (Ind)	Samuel Carnell (Ind)	Details	
Dannevirke	missing info (Ind)	missing info (Ind)	missing info (Ind)		
Woodville	missing info (Ind)	missing info (Ind)	missing info (Ind)		
Pahiatua	missing info (Ind)	missing info (Ind)	missing info (Ind)		
Masterton	Charles Aylmer Pownall (Ind)		John Hessey (Ind)		
Carterton	missing info (Ind)	missing info (Ind)	missing info (Ind)		
Greytown	missing info (Ind)	missing info (Ind)	missing info (Ind)		
Lower Hutt	Edmund Percy Bunny (Ind)	Orton Stevens (Ind)	Edmund Percy Bunny (Ind)		
Petone	Richard Clement Kirk (Ind)	Richard Mothes (Ind)	Richard Clement Kirk (Ind)	Details	
Onslow	John Holmes (Ind)	John Valentine (Ind)	unopposed		
Karori	Richard Bulkley (Ind)	Francis John McDonald (Ind)	James William Henderson (Ind)		
Melrose	George Frost (Ind)		James Reid (Ind)		
Picton	missing info (Ind)	missing info (Ind)	missing info (Ind)		
Blenheim	missing info (Ind)	missing info (Ind)	missing info (Ind)		
Nelson	missing info (Ind)	missing info (Ind)	missing info (Ind)		
Richmond	missing info (Ind)	missing info (Ind)	missing info (Ind)		
Motueka	missing info (Ind)	missing info (Ind)	missing info (Ind)		
Westport	missing info (Ind)	missing info (Ind)	missing info (Ind)		
Greymouth	missing info (Ind)	missing info (Ind)	missing info (Ind)		
Brunner	missing info (Ind)	missing info (Ind)	missing info (Ind)		
Kumara	missing info (Ind)	missing info (Ind)	missing info (Ind)		
Hokitika	missing info (Ind)	missing info (Ind)	missing info (Ind)		
Ross	missing info (Ind)	missing info (Ind)	missing info (Ind)		
Rangiora	missing info (Ind)	missing info (Ind)	missing info (Ind)		
Kaiapoi	missing info (Ind)	missing info (Ind)	missing info (Ind)		
Christchurch	missing info (Ind)	missing info (Ind)	missing info (Ind)		
Linwood	Frederick Board (Ind)	Herbert Pearce (Ind)	Frederick Board (Ind)		
St Albans	missing info (Ind)	missing info (Ind)	missing info (Ind)		
Sydenham	missing info (Ind)	missing info (Ind)	missing info (Ind)		
Woolston	missing info (Ind)	missing info (Ind)	missing info (Ind)		
Sumner	missing info (Ind)	missing info (Ind)	missing info (Ind)		
New Brighton	missing info (Ind)	missing info (Ind)	missing info (Ind)		
Lyttelton	missing info (Ind)	missing info (Ind)	missing info (Ind)		
Akaroa	missing info (Ind)	missing info (Ind)	missing info (Ind)		
Ashburton	missing info (Ind)	missing info (Ind)	missing info (Ind)		
Temuka	missing info (Ind)	missing info (Ind)	missing info (Ind)		
Timaru	missing info (Ind)	missing info (Ind)	missing info (Ind)		
Waimate	missing info (Ind)	missing info (Ind)	missing info (Ind)		
Oamaru	missing info (Ind)	missing info (Ind)	missing info (Ind)		
Hampden	missing info (Ind)	missing info (Ind)	missing info (Ind)		
Palmerston South	missing info (Ind)	missing info (Ind)	missing info (Ind)		
Hawksbury	missing info (Ind)	missing info (Ind)	missing info (Ind)		
Port Chalmers	missing info (Ind)	missing info (Ind)	missing info (Ind)		
North East Valley	missing info (Ind)	missing info (Ind)	missing info (Ind)		
Maori Hill	missing info (Ind)	missing info (Ind)	missing info (Ind)		
West Harbour	missing info (Ind)	missing info (Ind)	missing info (Ind)		
Roslyn	Alexander Matheson (Ind)	Thomas Mackenzie (Ind)	unopposed		
Mornington	missing info (Ind)	missing info (Ind)	missing info (Ind)		
Caversham	missing info (Ind)	missing info (Ind)	missing info (Ind)		
St Kilda	missing info (Ind)	missing info (Ind)	missing info (Ind)		
South Dunedin	missing info (Ind)	missing info (Ind)	missing info (Ind)		
Green Island	missing info (Ind)	missing info (Ind)	missing info (Ind)		
Mosgiel	missing info (Ind)	missing info (Ind)	missing info (Ind)		
Milton	missing info (Ind)	missing info (Ind)	missing info (Ind)		
Kaitangata	missing info (Ind)	missing info (Ind)	missing info (Ind)		
Balclutha	John McNeil (Ind)	Daniel Stewart (Ind)	John McNeil (Ind)		
Lawrence	missing info (Ind)	missing info (Ind)	missing info (Ind)		
Roxburgh	missing info (Ind)	missing info (Ind)	missing info (Ind)		
Tapanui	missing info (Ind)	missing info (Ind)	missing info (Ind)		
Naseby	missing info (Ind)	missing info (Ind)	missing info (Ind)		
Cromwell	missing info (Ind)	missing info (Ind)	missing info (Ind)		
Alexandra	missing info (Ind)	missing info (Ind)	missing info (Ind)		
Arrowtown	missing info (Ind)	missing info (Ind)	missing info (Ind)		
Queenstown	missing info (Ind)	missing info (Ind)	missing info (Ind)		
Gore	missing info (Ind)	missing info (Ind)	missing info (Ind)		
Mataura	missing info (Ind)	missing info (Ind)	missing info (Ind)		
Winton	missing info (Ind)	missing info (Ind)	missing info (Ind)		
Invercargill	Charles Stephen Longuet (Ind)		Horace Bastings (Ind)	Details	
North Invercargill	missing info (Ind)	missing info (Ind)	missing info (Ind)		
South Invercargill	missing info (Ind)	missing info (Ind)	missing info (Ind)		
East Invercargill	missing info (Ind)	missing info (Ind)	missing info (Ind)		
Avenal	missing info (Ind)	missing info (Ind)	missing info (Ind)		
Gladstone	missing info (Ind)	missing info (Ind)	missing info (Ind)		
Campbelltown	missing info (Ind)	missing info (Ind)	missing info (Ind)		
Riverton	missing info (Ind)	missing info (Ind)	missing info (Ind)		

=== Town districts ===
The town district boards governed the small towns of the country, often as an intermediary step before being granted borough status. There were 35 town districts in 1901. Town district board elections occurred every two years; only by-elections occurred in this year's local elections.

=== Counties ===
The county councils governed the rural portions of the country. There were 86 counties in 1901. County council elections were held every 3 years; only by-elections occurred in this year's local elections.

=== Other local government bodies ===
In 1901, there were also 224 road boards, 29 river boards, 1 drainage board, 2 water-supply boards, 16 land drainage boards, and 26 harbour boards.
