= 1901 Hastings Borough Council election =

Election in New Zealand

← 1900	24 April / 15 May 1901	1902 →
- Turnout: 1,162 (71.20%)
- Mayoral election
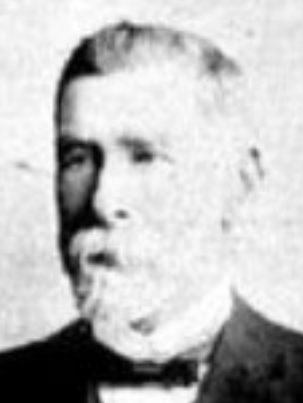

Candidate	William Dennett	Cecil Fitzroy
Party	Independent	Independent
Popular vote	674	480
Percentage	58.00%	41.31%
Mayor before election
William Dennett
Independent
Elected mayor
William Dennett
Independent
- Council election
- 9 seats on the Hastings Borough Council; 5 seats needed for a majority
Party	Seats	+/–
Independents	9	+3
This lists parties that won seats. See the complete results below.

The 1901 Hastings Borough Council election was a local election intended to be held on 24 April in the Borough of Hastings of New Zealand as part of that year's nation-wide local elections. Voters elected the mayor of Hastings a one year term and 9 borough councillors for a two year term. In person voting and the first-past-the-post voting system were used.

The date of election of the mayor was rescheduled as both candidates withdrew due to an informality found on the incumbent mayor's nomination form; a nominator of him did not meet the requirements. The council election was held on the initially scheduled date and the mayoral election was held on 15 May.

Dennett was re-elected to the mayoralty, defeating former mayor Cecil Fitzroy 58-to-41. Two councillors were re-elected, the other seven being newly elected.

== Key dates ==
- 9 April — Notice of the election published
- 18 April — Notice of nominated candidates published
- 24 April — Council election date
- 26 April — Notice of elected councillors published and notice of the new mayoral election published
- 1 May — Enrolment period ended
- 4 May — Nominations for mayoral election candidacy closed
- 15 May — Mayoral election date

== Background ==
=== Legislation ===
This was the first election in the borough held under the new Municipal Corporations Act 1900.

=== Mayoral candidates ===
William Dennett, born in Hobart, Australia, was a Roman Catholic auctioneer and a mason. He had worked in the Victorian and Otago goldfields and in the colonial defense force.

Cecil Fitzroy was born in Norfolk, England, and was educated at Eton and Cambridge. He immigrated to Australia in 1867 and became a sheep farmer before moving to Canterbury where he served as the member of Parliament for Selwyn. He become a sheep inspector and director of the Heretaunga Co-operative Dairy Company after moving to Hastings. He had been the mayor of the borough from 1894 until being defeated by Dennett in 1899.

== Campaign ==
=== Mayor ===
Dennett discovered that his nomination as candidate was invalid due to one his nominators being illegible to do so, and thus he was forced to withdraw from the race. Fitzroy, not wanting to simply walk into office, also withdrew his candidacy. Thus new rounds of nominations were required. Their notifications of retirement were published in the Hastings Standard on 22 April.

In the period between the council election and the mayoral election, 243 people registered on the burgess list to be able to vote, bringing the number of registered electors to 1,633.

Voting for the mayoral election took place at the Borough Council Chambers and at the Princess Theatre.

The Hastings Standard said the "vagrant cow question" was an important issue in the election, with the paper seeing the incumbent mayor Dennett as too liberal or weak willed in stopping people from letting their cows graze on the public roads and land of the borough. In the same column, the paper praised the mayor for his "unostentatious" and "untiring" work as mayor. The paper, on the other hand, said that Fitzroy "[suffered] considerably in comparison" to Dennett. They criticised his previous stint as mayor.

The two candidates addressed an audience at the Princess Theatre on 14 May. Dennett said that he had been elected at the previous election on the "retrenchment ticket" and that in his period as mayor he had been successful in laying 23 miles of drains and 40 miles of roads. He dismissed claims he had let cattle graze freely, and pointed to a reduction in borough debt from £2,203 to £1,864 during his tenure. Fitzroy went through a history of the borough, specifically how debts were occurred during the tenures of the mayors; based on this he implied that the debt rise of £337 during his tenure was low.

== List of candidates ==
=== Mayor ===
Candidate	Photo	Notes
William Dennett		Incumbent mayor of Hastings (first elected 1899)
Cecil Fitzroy		Former mayor of Hastings (1894–1899)

=== Council ===
Candidate	Notes
William Arthur Beecroft	
Charles George Cunnold	
George Ebbett	Future mayor of Hastings.
Alfred Amory George	
William John Graham	
Matthew Johnson	
William Baxter Jones	
William Charles Maddison	
Edward Newbigin	
George Roach	Future mayor of Hastings.
David Scannell	
William Henry Smith	
Thomas Thompson	Future mayor of Hastings.

== Results ==
=== Council ===
Thompson and Beecroft were the only incumbent elected, the seven others were newly elected.

The results of the borough council election as held on 24 April were:

Candidate	Votes	%
William Charles Maddison	587	70.38
George Roach	489	58.63
Thomas Thompson	484	58.03
William Henry Smith	468	56.12
George Ebbett	459	55.04
William Arthur Beecroft	431	51.68
William Baxter Jones	420	50.36
Edward Newbigin	376	45.08
David Scannell	363	43.53
Alfred Amory George	355	42.57
Charles George Cunnold	276	33.09
Matthew Johnson	266	31.89
William John Graham	138	16.55
Informal	14	1.68
Turnout	834	

=== Mayor ===
Dennett defeated Fitzroy, being re-elected to a second term of office as mayor.

Candidate	Votes	%
William Dennett	674	58.00
Cecil Fitzroy	480	41.31
Informal	8	0.69
Turnout	1,162	

== Aftermath and analysis ==
The Hawke's Bay Herald reported on 27 April that the election had the highest turnout yet for the borough, and expected the mayoral election to be even more so. This would come to fruition, with 1,162 people voting in the election.

The result of the mayoral election was received with cheers. Dennett gave a speech thanking everyone for returning him to office. Fitzroy also tried to speak to the crowd, but was met with a "considerable" display of hostility. Eventually he was allowed to speak, and conceded to Dennett and the will of the voters. The mayor was sworn in on 18 May.
