= 1901 Christchurch City Council election =

← 1899	24 April 1901	1902 →
- Mayoral election
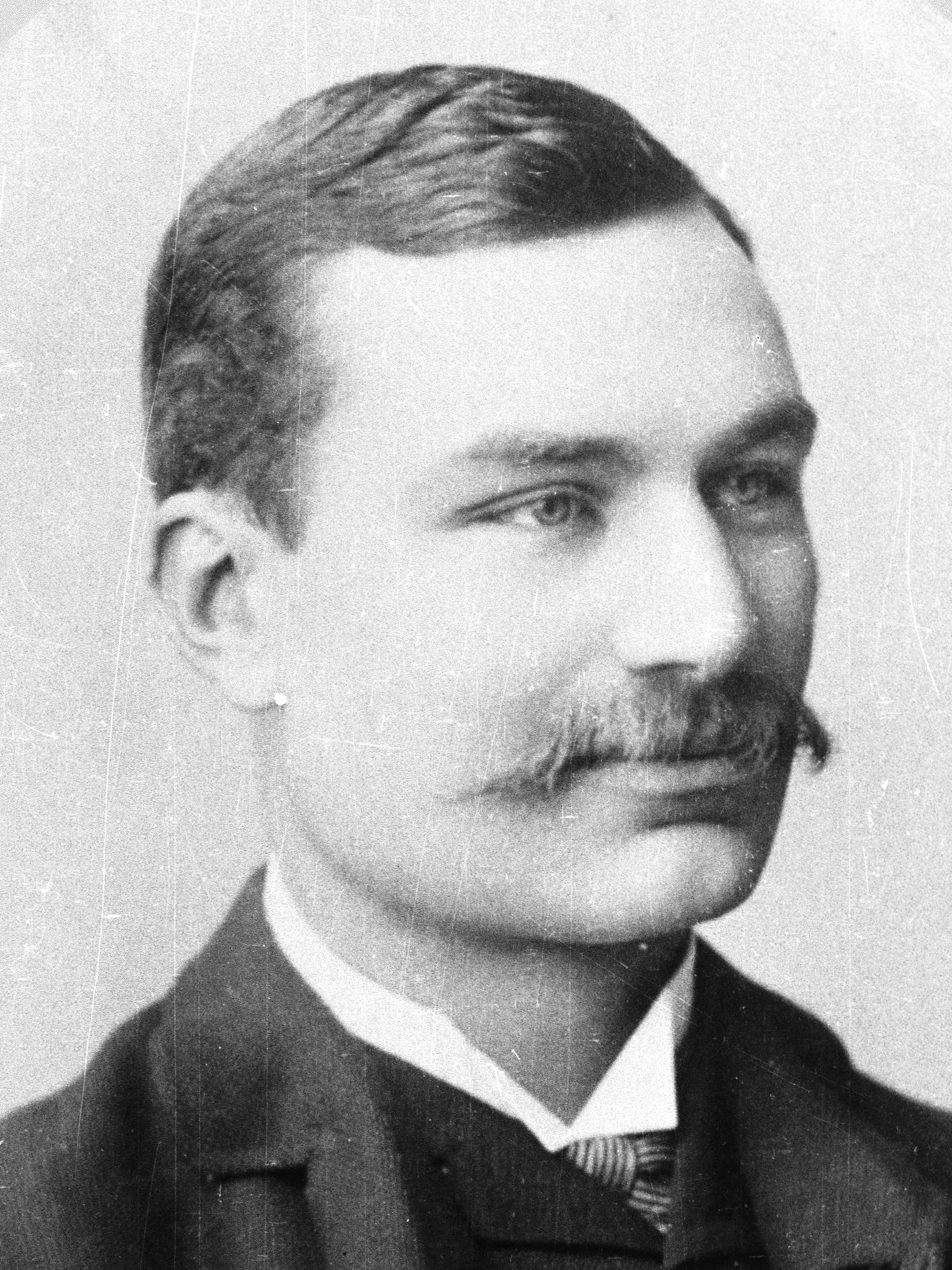
Candidate	Arthur Rhodes
Affiliation	Independent
Popular vote	unopposed
Mayor before election
William Reece
Independent
Elected mayor
Arthur Rhodes
Independent
- Council election
- 12 seats on the Christchurch City Council; 7 seats needed for a majority
Party	Seats	+/–
Independents	12	
This lists parties that won seats. See the complete results below.

The 1901 Christchurch City Council election was a local election held on 24 April in Christchurch, New Zealand, as part of that year's nation-wide local elections. Voters elected the mayor of Christchurch for a one year term and 12 city councillors for a two year term. In person voting and the first-past-the-post voting system were used.

== Results ==
=== Mayor ===
Arthur Rhodes was elected unopposed to the position of mayor.

=== Council ===
R M Macdonald, John M Taylor, and George Simpson were newly elected.

==== North-east ward ====
Three candidates were returned unopposed for the three North-east ward seats.

Affiliation	Candidate	Votes	%
Independent	John Clarke	unopposed	
Independent	W E Samuels	unopposed	
Independent	George Simpson	unopposed	

==== South-east ward ====
John M Taylor, H H Loughnan, and Henry Wood were elected in the south-east ward.

Affiliation	Candidate	Votes	%
Independent	John M Taylor	189	
Independent	H H Loughnan	181	
Independent	Henry Wood	168	
Independent	Richard A Green	136	
Informal			
Turnout			
Registered			

==== South-west ward ====
Three candidates were returned unopposed for the three South-west ward seats.

Affiliation	Candidate	Votes	%
Independent	C D Morris	unopposed	
Independent	J T Smith	unopposed	
Independent	H B Sorensen	unopposed	

==== North-west ward ====
Charles Gray, George Payling, and Ranald Macdonald were elected in the north-west ward. Gray and Payling would be elected mayors of Christchurch in subsequent years. The fourth candidate, William Prudhoe, failed to get re-elected as councillor; he had been mayor during 1892.

Affiliation	Candidate	Votes	%
Independent	Charles Gray	292	
Independent	George Payling	270	
Independent	Ranald Macdonald	262	
Independent	William Prudhoe	143	
Informal			
Turnout			
Registered			
