= 1901 Napier Borough Council election =

Local election in New Zealand

- 24 April 1901
- Turnout: 2,477
- Mayoral election
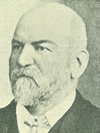

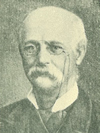
Candidate	John McVay	Samuel Carnell
Party	Independent	Progressive Liberal
Popular vote	1,252	1,204
Percentage	50.55%	48.61%
Mayor before election
George Swan
Conservative
Elected mayor
John McVay
Independent
- Council election
- 12 seats on the Napier Borough Council; 7 seats needed for a majority
Party	Seats	+/–
Electors	5	
Progressive Liberal / Electors	3	
Independents	2	
Progressive Liberal	1	
Conservative	1	
This lists parties that won seats. See the complete results below.

The 1901 Napier Borough Council election was a local election held on 24 April in the Borough of Napier of New Zealand, as part of that year's nation-wide local elections. Voters elected the mayor of Napier for a one-year term and 12 city councillors for a two-year term. In person voting and the first-past-the-post voting system were used.

== Background ==
This election was the first held following the changes made to local governance and elections under the Municipal Corporations Act 1900. The previously existing wards in the borough were abolished and instead councillors were elected at-large. The borough had had 9 councillors but now 12 were to be elected.

Incumbent mayor George Swan did not run for re-election as mayor, but did run for council.

== Campaign ==
=== Napier Progressive Liberal Association ===
At a meeting on the 27 March, the Napier Progressive Liberal Association adopted a platform which they submitted to candidates for consideration.

The policies supported by the group included the "municipalisation" of borough lighting, that contacts for street lighting made with the Gas Company be for annual terms only, the improvement of the sewer outlet, the abolition of the Public Works Committee, the holding of weekly council meetings, the reorganisation of council staff on a "more economical" basis, that borough officials should not accept other employment, that all employees, regardless of if they're salaried or otherwise, be on "equal-footing" with regards to holiday wages, the introduction of a minimum wage in contracts for labour, and that all council employees be paid no less than 8 shillings a day.

=== Napier Municipal Reform Association ===
The Napier Municipal Reform Association released a platform advocating for several policies including the reduction of costs spent on council staff, the reorganisation of the staff, the paying of a fixed monthly salary to the mayor, the municipal control of street lighting, that all council business be done in the open before the press, that details of committee meetings be given to the press, the abolition of log-rolling in "special" parts of the borough, the appointment of an executive to help the mayor, and that no expense be incurred unless agreed by council in open meeting.

=== Napier Electors' Association ===
The Napier Electors' Association said they would support independent candidates for election. The association declared that they were "free from all political bias". They supported an inquiry by a "competent" sanitary engineer with regards to the borough's water infrastructure, and the establishment of a public library and baths. They supported the formation and leveling of outlying streets and the purchase of the gas works; if this could not be done they would support only annual lighting contracts. They supported an inquiry on the cost of introducing electric lighting and into equitable pay of borough staff. They supported collaboration with other local bodies to establish light railways to open up trade.

== Candidates ==
=== Mayor ===
==== John McVay ====
John McVay was an incumbent borough councillor, having held the position for 17 years. He had been the chair of the public works, water works, road, and finance committees over that time, amongst others. McVay wrote in the Hawke's Bay Herald that he had helped bring the various amenities of the city to a state of "execellence", whilst noting that the rates in the borough were lower than elsewhere in the country. He wrote that he supported the construction of public baths in the borough and that a concrete storm water channel would need to be constructed following the reclamation of the "Whare-o-maranui" reserve. He wrote that he supported a public library being constructed but objected the plans that had been previously suggested before the council.

==== Samuel Carnell ====
Samuel Carnell had served briefly in parliament as a Liberal MP for the Napier electorate. The Waipawa Mail derided his term as an MP as a "wretched failure".

=== Incumbents ===
Incumbent borough councillor Frederick George Smith stood for re-election, having already been on the council for 15 years.

=== Napier Progressive Liberal Association ===
The association endorsed mayoral candidate Samuel Carnell and 12 candidates who supported their platform.

=== Napier Electors' Association ===
The association endorsed 12 candidates who supported their platform. (Note: Robert Bristy; Hyman Phineas Cohen; Charles Hugh Cranby; Thomas Charles Dawson; Montague William Percy Lascelles; William James McGrath; Robert Northe; William Plowman; Frederick William Robjohns; Frederick George Smith; James Spence; John Chaddesley Westall)

== Results ==
=== Mayor ===
John McVay narrowly defeated Samuel Carnell by 48 votes.

Affiliation	Candidate	Votes	%
Independent	John McVay	1,252	50.55
Progressive Liberal	Samuel Carnell	1,204	48.61
Informal		21	0.85
Turnout		2,477	
Registered			

By polling booth
Booth	McVay	Carnell	Informal	Totals
Council Chambers	469	263	6	738
Foresters' Hall	205	248	7	460
Shakespeare Road	167	119	2	288
Spit	128	300	3	431
Chaucer Road	78	150	0	228
Orange Hall	207	124	3	334
Totals	1,252	1,204	21	2,477

=== Council ===
12 borough councillors were elected. All incumbent councilors were returned except Laws and Robjohns.

Affiliation	Candidate	Votes	%
Electors	Montague William Percy Lascelles	1,675	67.62
Electors	Frederick George Smith	1,603	64.72
Progressive Liberal	John Vigor Brown	1,404	56.68
Progressive Liberal / Electors	William Plowman	1,396	56.36
Independent	Charles Howard Edwards	1,394	56.28
Conservative	George Henry Swan	1,347	54.38
Progressive Liberal / Electors	James Spence	1,085	43.80
Electors	Hyman Phineas Cohen	989	39.93
Electors	Charles Hugh Cranby	978	39.48
Electors	John Chaddesley Westall	966	39.00
Independent	George White	948	38.27
Progressive Liberal / Electors	William James McGrath	939	37.91
Independent	James Porteots Thomson	932	37.63
Progressive Liberal / Electors	Frederick William Robjohns	897	36.21
Electors	Thomas Charles Dawson	881	35.57
Progressive Liberal	Thomas Laws	714	28.83
Progressive Liberal	Andrew Paul	709	28.62
Progressive Liberal / Electors	Robert Northe	695	28.06
Independent	Arthur Hector Gore	570	23.01
Electors	Robert Bristy	512	20.67
Progressive Liberal	Robert Yuill	434	17.52
Progressive Liberal	Joseph David Briasco	367	14.82
Progressive Liberal	John Burden	346	13.97
Progressive Liberal	George William Temperley	274	11.06
Independent	George Edwards	255	10.29
Informal		218	8.80
Turnout		2,477	
Registered			
