= Samuel Manning =

New Zealand mayor (1841–1933)

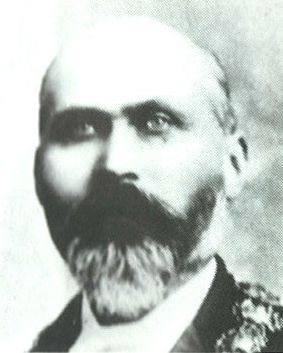
- Manning in 1890

16th Mayor of Christchurch
- In office 18 Dec 1889 – 17 Dec 1890
- Preceded by: Charles Louisson
- Succeeded by: Charles Gray

Personal details
- Born: 1841 Suffolk
- Died: 21 November 1933 (aged 91–92) St Albans, New Zealand
- Profession: Brewer

Samuel Manning (1841 – 21 November 1933) was a New Zealand brewer and Mayor of Christchurch in 1890.

== Early life and family ==
Manning was born in Suffolk in 1841 and attended primary school at Needham Market. Together with his father and three siblings, he arrived on 23 December 1856 in Lyttelton on the Egmont; Bishop Harper and his family arrived on the same ship.

On 11 July 1861, Manning married Ellen Piper at St Michael's Church. His wife died, after some indifferent health, on 8 December 1894 aged 54. She was interred at Barbadoes Street Cemetery. At the time, the Mannings were living on Ferry Road at the corner with Fitzgerald Avenue in a property that they called Addiscombe.

On 3 July 1897, he married the widow Margaret Mary Innes, the daughter of William Healy of Nelson.

== Professional life ==
Like his father William, he was a maltster and brewer by trade. In New Zealand, he took on a variety of jobs in agriculture until 1860 and then brewed with his father until 1864 at the Suffolk Brewery in Barbadoes Street near Moorhouse Avenue. (Note: The source records the location as "near the South Belt"; this is the former name of Moorhouse Avenue.) In 1865, he founded his own brewing company, S. Manning and Co, in Ferry Road. He sold this company in 1882 but remained its managing director until 1889.

Later in life, he was on the board of several large companies or was a director, including the Mutual Benefit Building Society, the Provident and Industrial Insurance Company, the Crown Iron Works Company, and the Kaiapoi Woollen Company.

== Political career ==
Manning was elected onto the Heathcote Road Board in 1875 and the Drainage Board in 1882. Manning was first elected as a councillor of Christchurch City Council in 1885, and he was re-elected in 1888.

In August 1889, it was revealed that Manning had been asked to stand for mayor in the upcoming election. When he received a deputation from influential citizens in that respect a few days later, the local newspaper, The Press, gave councillor Manning a glowing report card. Councillor William Prudhoe was also asked to stand but he eventually declined, and Manning was declared elected unopposed. Manning was installed as mayor on 18 December 1889.

Mayoral elections were held on 26 November 1890. The two candidates were the incumbent, Samuel Manning, and Charles Gray, who received 492 and 665 votes, respectively. Gray was thus elected as the 17th mayor of Christchurch and was installed on 17 December 1890.

During his time on council, Manning was one of the strong advocates for amalgamating the outlying boroughs and districts with the city. This amalgamation took place in 1903.

== Death and commemoration ==
Manning died on 21 November 1933 at his home in Holly Road, St Albans. He was buried at Barbadoes Street Cemetery. Manning Street in Woolston is named after him.
