= Joseph Harley =

Joseph Harley may refer to:

- Joseph Emile Harley (1880–1942), Governor of South Carolina, 1941–1942
- Joseph Auty Harley (born 1843) (1843–1906), mayor of Nelson, New Zealand, 1899–1901
- Joseph Auty Harley (born 1895) (1895–1973), mayor of Nelson, New Zealand, 1947–1956
