= 1901 Invercargill Borough Council election =

1901 mayoral election in Invercargill, New Zealand

← 1900	24 April 1901	1902 →
- Turnout: 1,791 (72.64%)
- Mayoral election
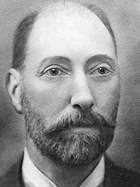

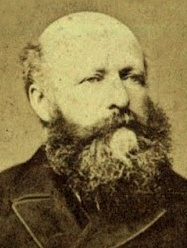

Candidate	Charles Stephen Longuet	Horace Bastings	Frederick George Stone
Party	Independent	Independent	Independent
Popular vote	641	357	293
Percentage	49.27	27.44	22.52
Mayor before election
James Smith Goldie
Elected mayor
Charles Stephen Longuet
- Council election
- 12 seats on the Invercargill Borough Council; 7 seats needed for a majority
Party	Seats	+/–
Independents	12	
This lists parties that won seats. See the complete results below.

The 1901 Invercargill Borough Council election was a local election held on 24 April in the Borough of Invercargill of New Zealand as part of that year's nation-wide local elections. Voters elected the mayor of Invercargill for a one year term and 12 borough councillors for a two year term. In person voting and the first-past-the-post voting system were used.

== Candidates ==
South Ward councillor Francis Rose intended to contest the election but dropped out in September 1900 and subsequently resigned from the council for "private reasons".

== Results ==
=== Mayor ===
The results of the mayoral election were:

1901 Invercargill mayoral election
Party	Candidate	Votes	%
Independent	Charles Stephen Longuet	641	49.27
Independent	Horace Bastings	357	27.44
Independent	Frederick George Stone	293	22.52
Informal		10	0.77
Turnout		1,301	72.64
Registered		1,791	

Results by ward
Ward	Longquet	Bastings	Stone
North	49	16	26
Second	300	204	101
Third	193	94	75
South	99	43	91
Totals	641	357	293

=== Council ===
==== North ward ====
Three candidates were returned unopposed for the three North ward seats.

Affiliation	Candidate	Votes	%
Independent	William A Ott	unopposed	
Independent	David Roche	unopposed	
Independent	James Thomson	unopposed	

==== Second ward ====
Three candidates were returned unopposed for the three Second ward seats.

Affiliation	Candidate	Votes	%
Independent	Robert Cleave	unopposed	
Independent	William Benjamin Scandrett	unopposed	
Independent	George Froggatt	unopposed	

==== Third ward ====
Candidates Archibald McKellar, John Stead, and William Maclister were elected in the third ward.

Affiliation	Candidate	Votes	%
Independent	Archibald McKellar	235	
Independent	John Stead	232	
Independent	William Macalister	206	
Independent	I Lawrence Petrie	136	
Informal		10	
Turnout			
Registered			

==== South ward ====
Three candidates were returned unopposed for the three South ward seats.

Affiliation	Candidate	Votes	%
Independent	William Manson	unopposed	
Independent	John Frederick Lillicrap	unopposed	
Independent	William Stead	unopposed	
