= Hawke's Bay Today =

Daily compact newspaper in Hastings, New Zealand

- Type: Daily newspaper
- Format: Compact
- Owner: New Zealand Media and Entertainment
- Editor: Chris Hyde
- Founded: 1999
- Headquarters: Hastings, New Zealand
- Website: www.nzherald.co.nz/hawkes-bay-today/

Hawke's Bay Today is a daily compact newspaper published in Hastings, New Zealand and serving Hastings, Napier and the Hawke's Bay region. It is owned by NZME. The Hawke's Bay Today is New Zealand's youngest newspaper, founded on 3 May 1999.

== History ==
Hawke's Bay Today was launched on 3 May 1999, a merger of the dailies the Hawke's Bay Herald-Tribune in Hastings and Napier's Daily Telegraph. Its earliest incarnation was "a Saturday morning weekly named the Hawke's Bay Herald and Ahuriri Advocate, which first rolled off the presses in Napier on 24 September 1857," according to the company website.

The Saturday evening Hawke's Bay Today was discontinued in 2002 to make way for the new weekend edition published on Saturday mornings.

In 2005 the local news content of the Dannevirke News was merged with Hawke's Bay Today.

On 19 March 2012, Hawke's Bay Today became a morning newspaper. It was previously released in the afternoon.

On 25 February 2013, the paper moved from a broadsheet to compact size.

In 2024, the paper won Newspaper of the Year at the Voyager Media Awards, as well as Best Use of Print at the INMA Global Media Awards for its coverage of Cyclone Gabrielle.
