= Henry Wigram =

New Zealand politician, aviator and businessman (1857–1934)

The Honourable Sir Henry Wigram
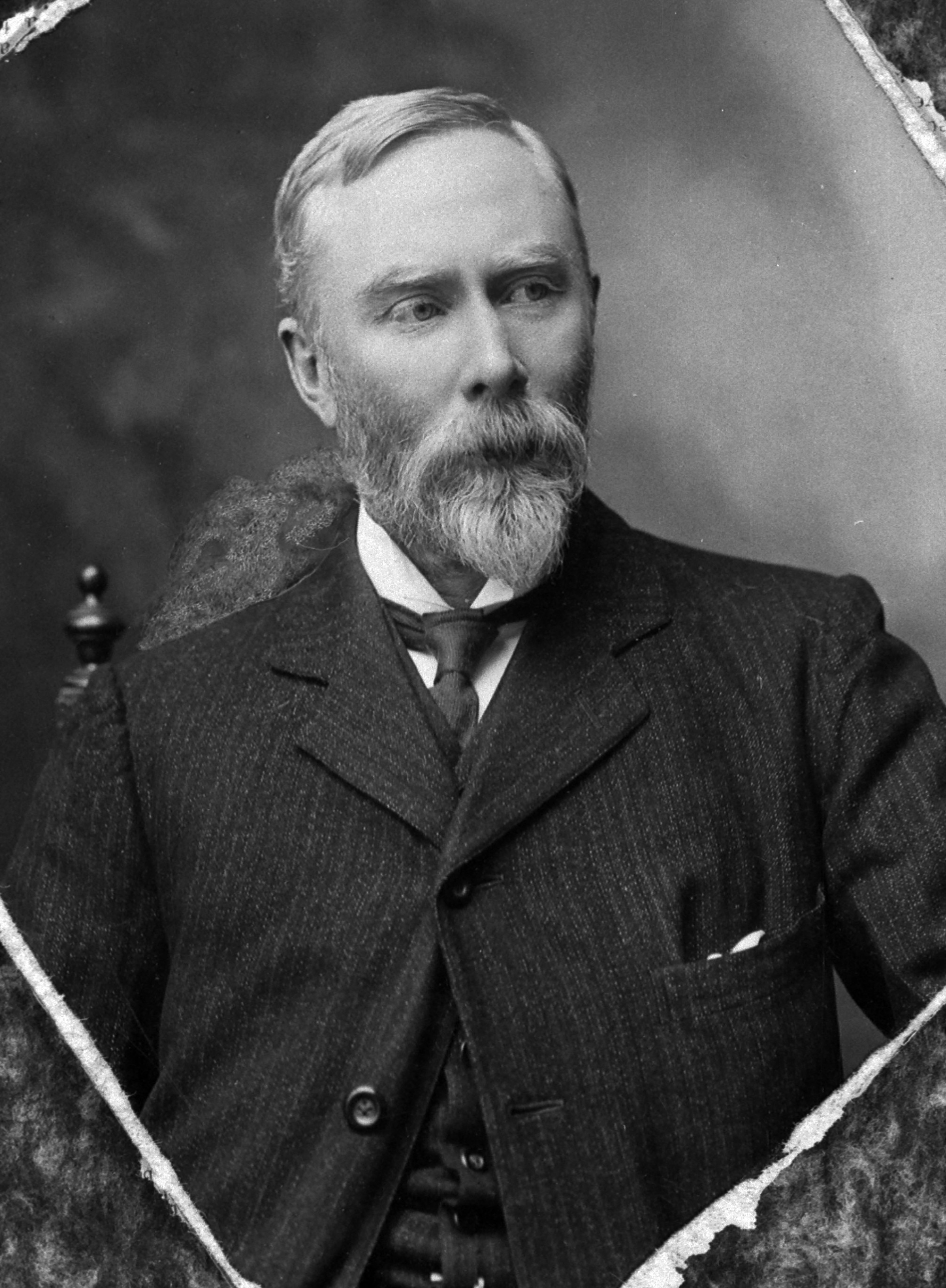
- Henry Wigram in 1903

25th Mayor of Christchurch
- In office 1902–1904
- Preceded by: Arthur Rhodes
- Succeeded by: Charles Gray

New Zealand Legislative Council
- In office 22 June 1903 – 12 October 1920

Personal details
- Born: 18 January 1857
- Died: 6 May 1934 (aged 77)
- Spouse: Agnes

Sir Henry Francis Wigram (18 January 1857 – 6 May 1934) was a New Zealand businessman, politician and aviation promoter. He is best known for his role in developing a public transport system in Christchurch and as a key player in the establishment of the Royal New Zealand Air Force.

== Early life and business ==
The son of Henry Knox Wigram, a barrister, and a grandson of Octavius Wigram, Governor of the Royal Exchange Assurance Corporation, Wigram was born in London and was educated at Harrow School. His mother was Mary Anne Pomeroy, a daughter of the 5th Viscount Harberton.

After working for the Bank of England and a shipping company, ill-health led him to emigrate to New Zealand, where he arrived in 1883. He returned to England briefly in 1885 in order to marry Agnes Vernon Sullivan. They had no children, and Agnes survived Henry by 23 years, dying in 1957.

Together with his brother, William Arthur Wigram, Henry bought a malthouse and brickworks business in the Heathcote Valley between Christchurch and Lyttelton. They soon took over two other brickworks and pipeworks and founded a nail factory and seed company. His prominence in business led to Wigram being invited to chair the committee for the Canterbury Jubilee celebration in 1900, and he remained heavily involved in public affairs for the next thirty years.

== Mayor of Christchurch ==
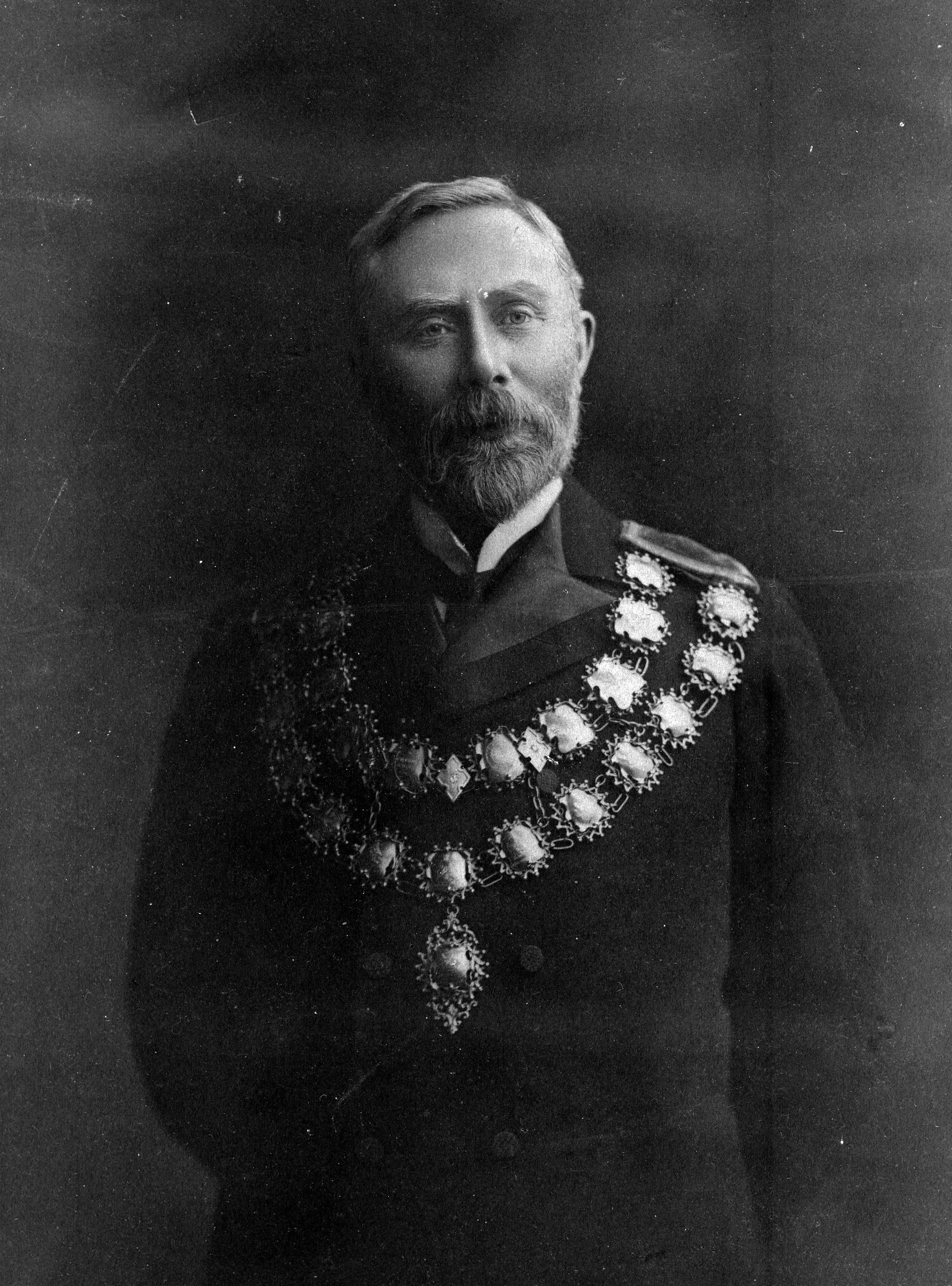
Henry Wigram wearing mayoral chains

In 1902, Wigram was nominated for the mayoralty and was elected unopposed on 23 April, and re-elected unopposed a year later on 21 April 1903. He worked on improving the tramway system, which until that time used horse-drawn trams with three independent operators. The Christchurch Tramway Board was formed in 1903, with Wigram as deputy-chairman. In order to facilitate planning and the development of infrastructure, Wigram campaigned for a reduction in the eleven separate boroughs that made up Greater Christchurch, and was successful in getting Linwood, St Albans and Sydenham to amalgamate with the city. The Tramway Board commenced electric tram services in 1905.

== Legislative Council ==
On 22 June 1903, Wigram was appointed to the Legislative Council by the Liberal Government. He retired from his business interests but retained a number of company directorships, including that of the Lyttelton Times newspaper. He resigned from the Legislative Council on 12 October 1920.

== Aviation ==
Wigram became aware of the potential of aviation during a visit to England in 1908. Unsuccessful at persuading the New Zealand Government to become involved in aviation, he formed a private flying school in Christchurch in 1915. This was the second in the country, the Walsh brothers having opened the New Zealand Flying School at Auckland a year earlier.

Wigram purchased land at Sockburn for his Canterbury Aviation Company (NZ) and at his own expense purchased three Caudron biplanes from Britain. The aim of the school was to train pilots for the war, to promote aviation in local defence and to pioneer commercial aviation.

By 1919, the school had built 10 aircraft and trained 182 pilots. Wigram offered the school to the government for defence purposes, but it took another four years and £10,000 donation before the government accepted. The airfield at Sockburn was renamed Wigram in honour of its founder.

Wigram was also one of the founders of the Canterbury Aero Club and was the first patron of the New Zealand Aero Club in 1930. He was appointed a Knight Bachelor in the 1926 New Year Honours, in recognition of his public services.

In 1949, his widow Agnes presented the Lady Wigram Trophy, and an annual motor race was established at the Wigram airbase.

== Bibliography ==
- Wigram, Henry (1916). The Story of Christchurch, New Zealand. Christchurch: Lyttelton Times.

Political offices
Preceded by Arthur Rhodes	Mayor of Christchurch; 1902–1904	Succeeded by Charles Gray
