= Belmont Regional Park =

Regional park in Wellington, New Zealand

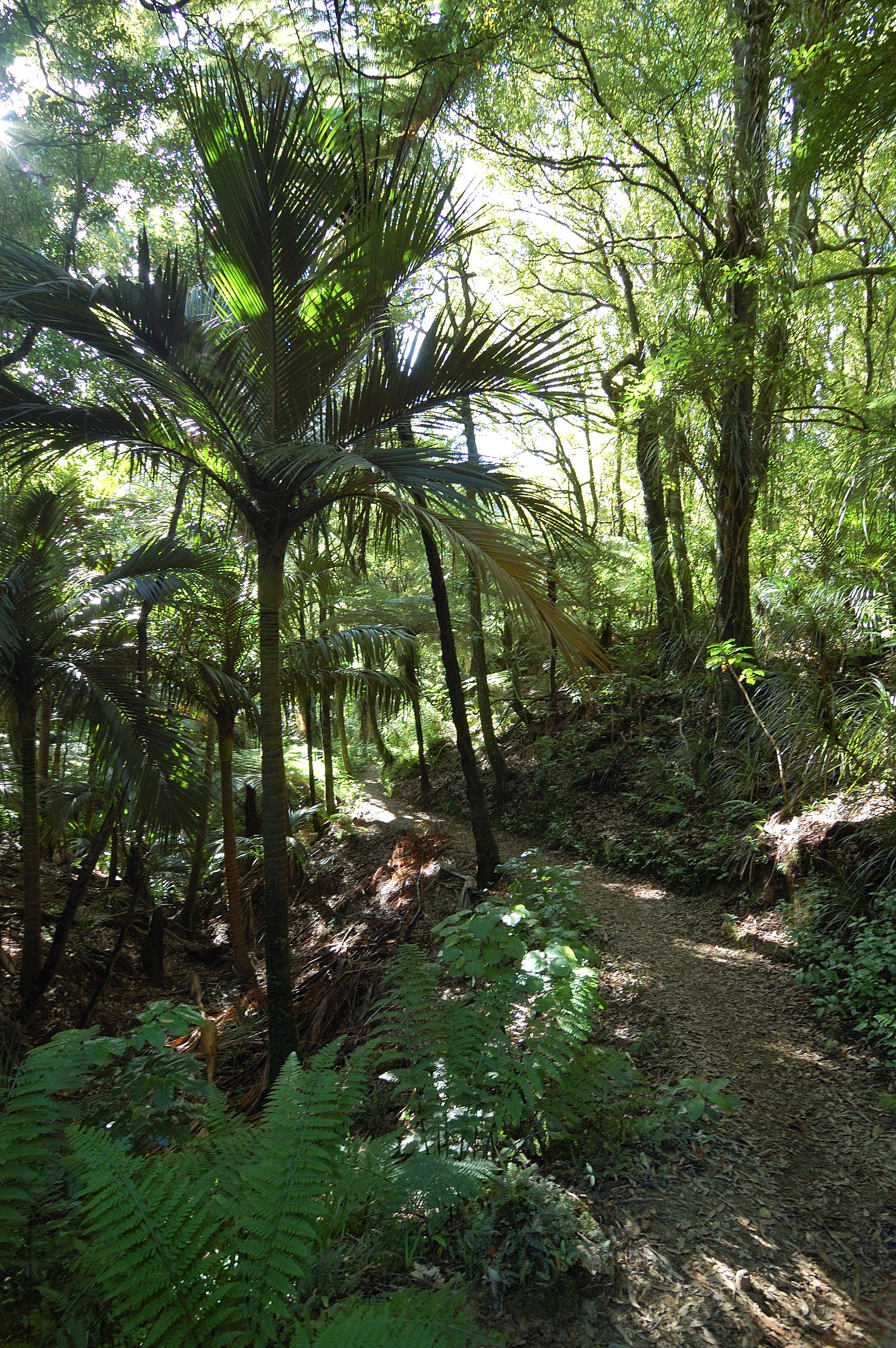
- Walking track in Belmont Regional Park
- Interactive map of Belmont Regional Park
- Type: Regional park
- Location: Petone and Cannons Creek, New Zealand
- Coordinates: 41.19°S 174.875°E
- Created: 1986
- Operator: Wellington Regional Council
- Status: Open

Belmont Regional Park is a regional park located between Lower Hutt and Porirua, in the Wellington Region at the southern end of New Zealand's North Island. It is administered by Wellington Regional Council. It was the first park in New Zealand to include land for recreation, conservation, and farming.

== Geography ==
The park covers about 15 kilometres (9 mi) from Wellington Harbour to Haywards and 10 kilometres (6 mi) to Porirua.

It contains farm land, native bush, and peaks up to 456 metres (1,496 ft) (Belmont Trig).

The hills were originally covered in rimu and northern rātā, over a canopy of tawa and hinau. Some pockets of native forest have remained, particularly around Korokoro Valley, which has been used for water collection.

== History ==
=== 19th century – 1986 ===
European settlers took private ownership of the area in the late 18th century, clearing the dense bush for farmland. The New Zealand Government purchased some of the land for water during the early 19th century.

The first two concrete gravity dams in New Zealand were built on the Korokoro Stream in 1903 and 1904. Designed by engineer Samuel Jickell they were the Korokoro Dam, a dam to supply water for Petone, and a dam for the Wellington Woollen Mill Manufacturing Company.

The New Zealand Army also purchased land for ammunition magazines during the World War II, to store munitions used in the Pacific Ocean theatre.

=== 1986–2016 ===
The park was established in 1986, under the name Waitangirua Farm. It was renamed Belmont Regional Park in 1989, becoming the first park in New Zealand to combine land for recreation, conservation and farming.

Landcorp took ownership of part of the park from June 1986 to June 2016, which it used to run a sheep and beef breeding farm. Landcorp attempted to sell a third of the park to private farmers in 2005. After a local campaign against the sale, the New Zealand Government, Wellington Regional Council and Porirua City Council intervened to buy the land instead.

=== 2016–2020 ===
When Landcorp's lease ended in June 2016, part of the land was allowed to revert to native vegetation. The remainder was opened to commercial farming licenses.

The construction of Transmission Gully between 2016 and 2022 further reduced the available grazing area in the park. The company in charge of building Transmission Gully was convicted and fined for discharging sentiment into streams in Belmont Regional Park over a month-long early 2019, with sentencing occurring in 2020.

A body was discovered next to a burnt car in the park in February 2016. A helicopter with specialist thermal gear was used to find a missing beagle in the park in April 2018. In August 2018, children found an explosive shell in the regional park that appeared to be from World War II.

=== 2020–present ===
Wellington Regional Council consulted on the future of the park in 2020, opting reduce stock grazing and increase native bush and wetlands.

In 2021, there were reports of deer turning up in the regional park and nearby suburbs.

Planting was due to take place in western parts of the park in 2022, as part of New Zealand's largest ever plant restoration project.

== Recreation ==
There are several entrances from the Hutt Valley side and two on the Porirua side. Some tracks permit mountain biking and horse riding. The 6–7 hour 'Puke Ariki' traverse, is used by trampers and mountainbikers.

There is also a cheap camping site in the park.

== Gallery ==
Belmont Regional Park

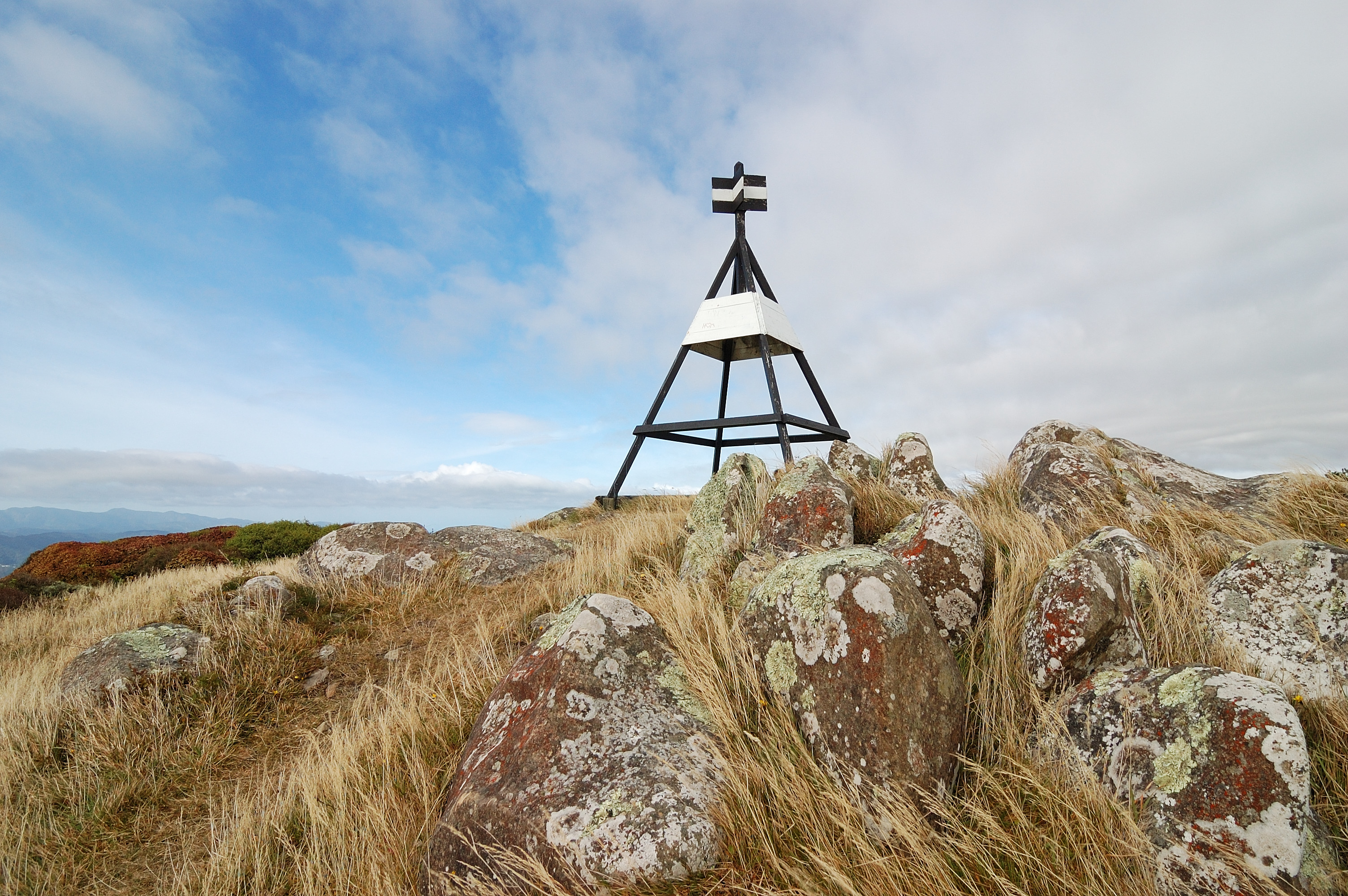
Belmont trig

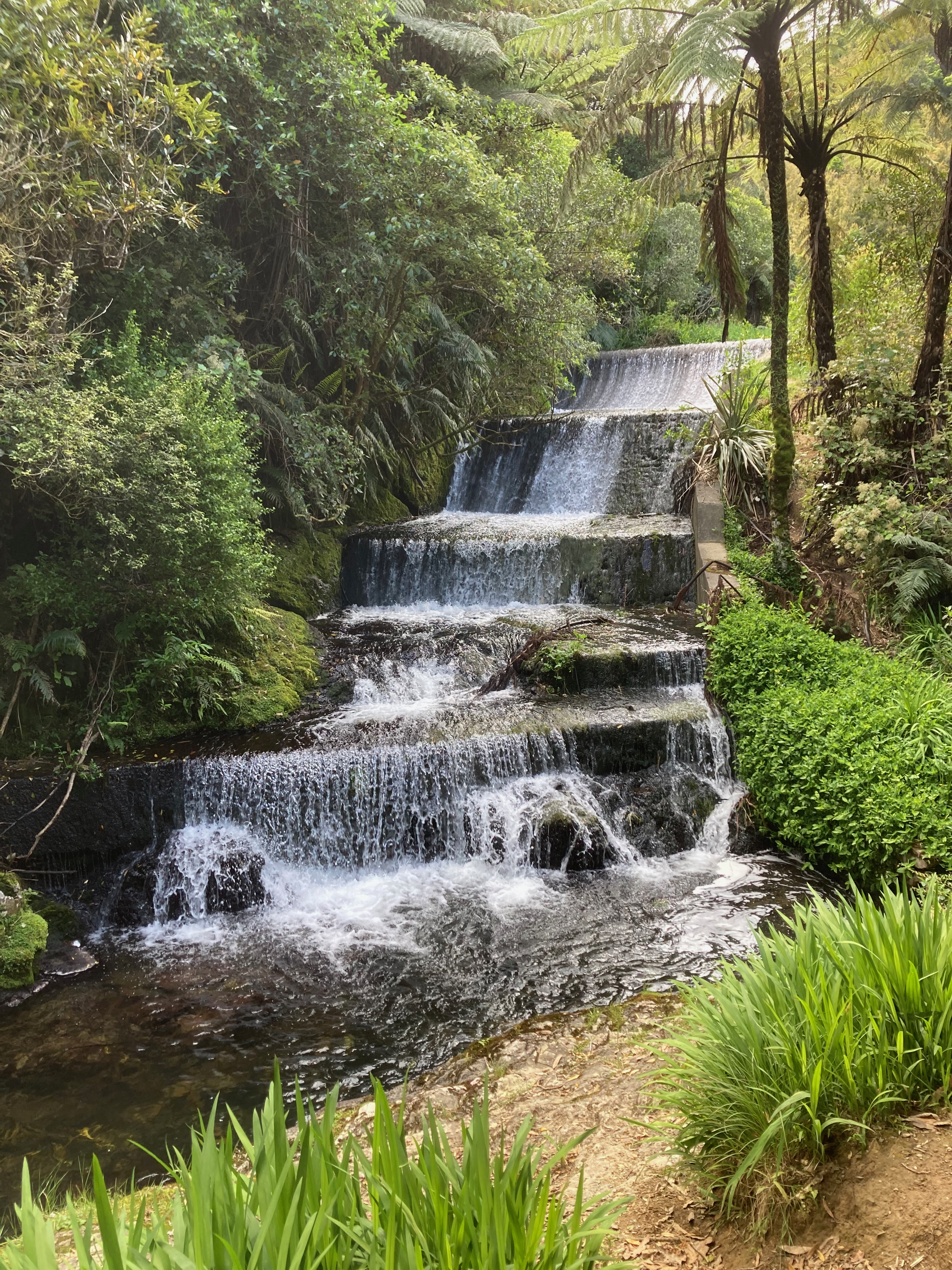
Korokoro Dam, 2023

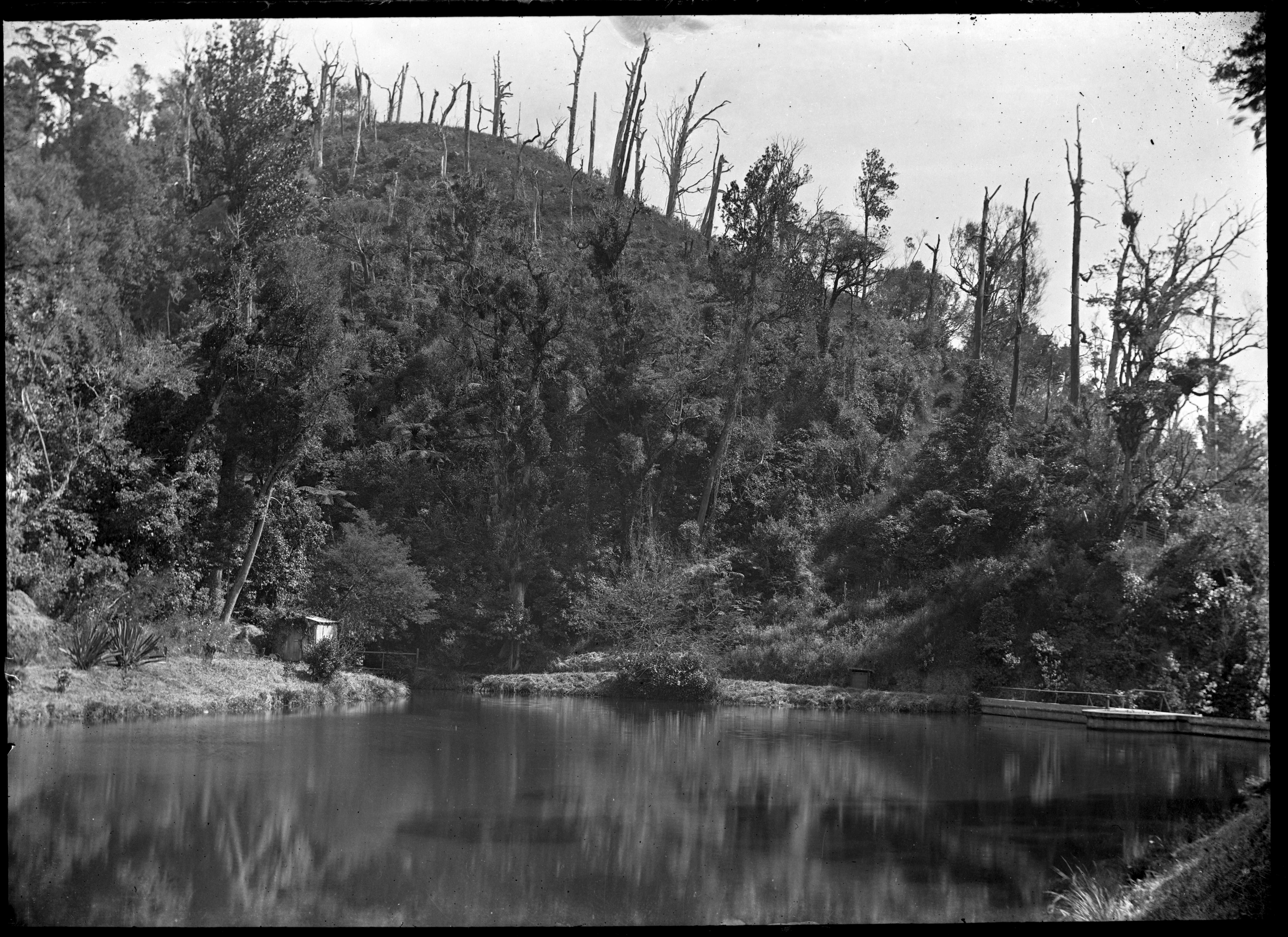
Korokoro Reservoir, 1912

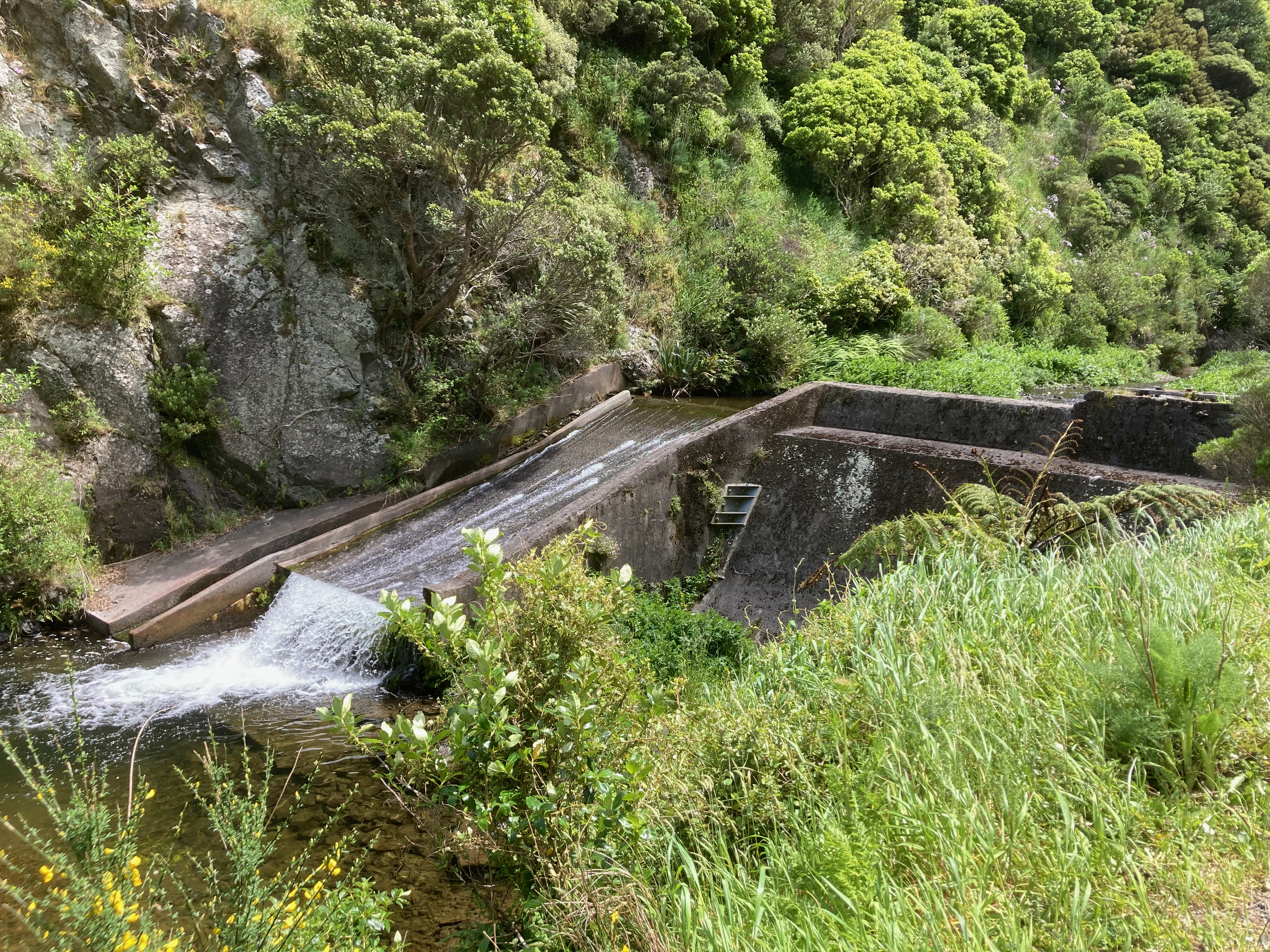
Woollen Mills dam, 2023
