= 1901 Auckland City Council election =

Election in New Zealand

← 1900	24 April 1901	1902 →
- Mayoral election
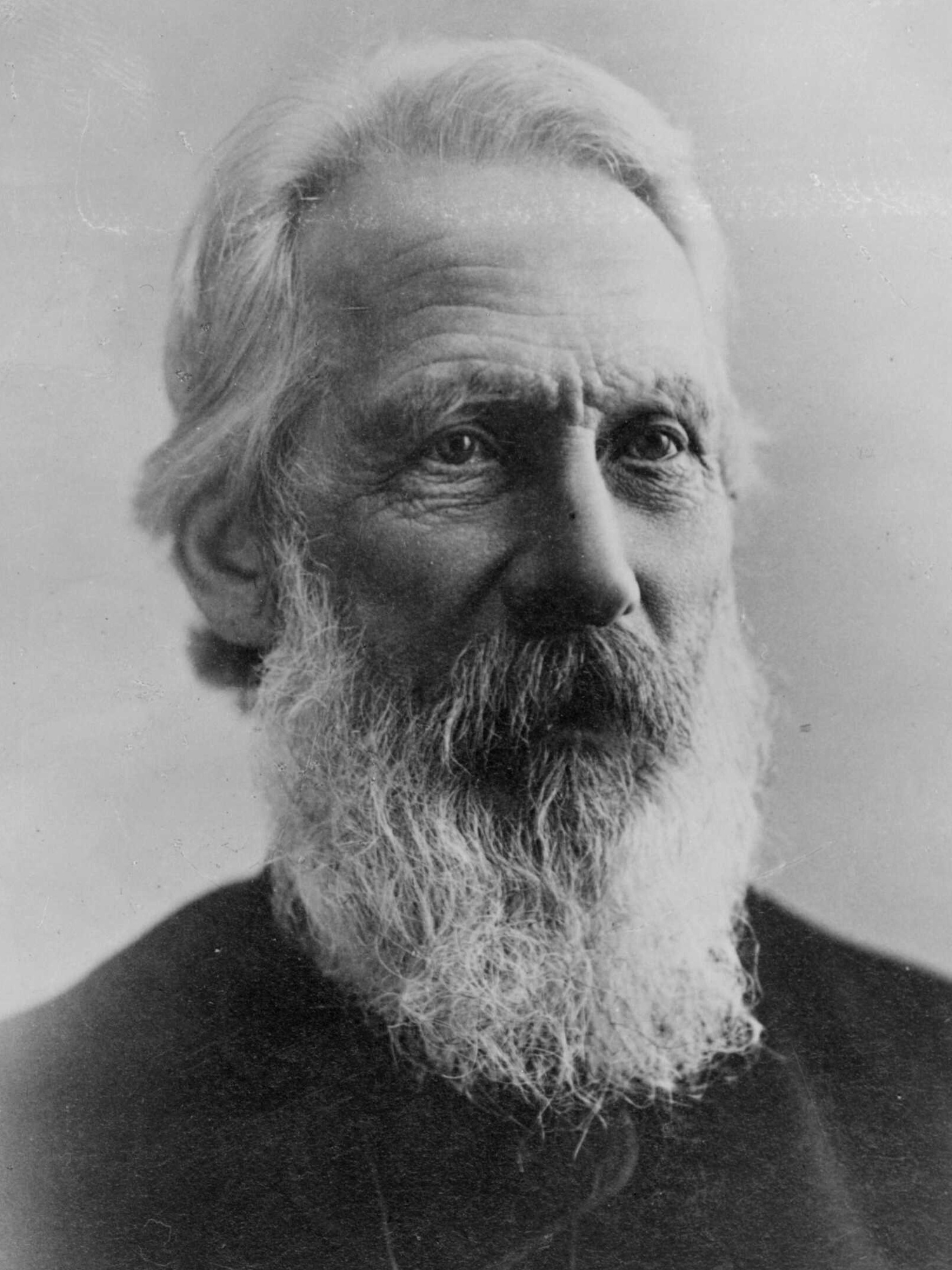

Candidate	John Logan Campbell	Daniel Arkell
Party	Independent	Independent
Popular vote	3,517	895
Percentage	79.71	20.29
Mayor before election
David Goldie
Independent
Elected mayor
John Logan Campbell
Independent
- Council election
- 16 seats on the Auckland City Council; 9 seats needed for a majority
Party	Seats	+/–
Liberal–Labour	9	
Independents	5	
Independent Liberal	1	
This lists parties that won seats. See the complete results below.

The 1901 Auckland City Council election was a local election held on 24 April in Auckland, New Zealand as part of that year's nation-wide local elections. Voters elected the mayor of Auckland City for a one-year term and 15 city councillors for a two-year term. In person voting and the first-past-the-post voting system were used.

== Background ==
For Auckland Council, elections were held in three wards: South (3 positions; 5 candidates), Ponsonby (3 positions; 4 candidates), and Grafton (3 positions; 5 candidates).In the North and East wards, there were three candidates in each ward, which matched the number of positions available, and these candidates were therefore declared elected unopposed. In total, 15 positions were available and 20 candidates stood in the various wards.

== Campaign ==
The Liberal and Labour Federation ran 9 candidates and endorsed Campbell for mayor. Frederick Baume was elected as an independent but was a member of the Liberal Association.

The Workers' Municipal Reform League endorsed Arthur Rosser, a Liberal–Labour candidate, in the South ward.

== Results ==
=== Mayor ===
John Logan Campbell defeated Daniel Arkell in an overwhelming landslide victory.

=== Council ===
==== East ward ====
1901 Auckland City Council election, East ward
Party	Candidate	Votes	%	±%
Independent Liberal	Frederick Baume	Unopposed		
Independent	Charles Grey	Unopposed		
Liberal–Labour	Alfred Kidd	Unopposed		
Registered electors		1,283		

==== Grafton ward ====
1901 Auckland City Council election, Grafton ward
Party	Candidate	Votes	%	±%
Liberal–Labour	John Patterson	813	68.96	
Liberal–Labour	Henry Thomas Garralt	711	60.31	
Liberal–Labour	John William Hewson	620	52.59	
Independent	James Jamieson	591	50.13	
Independent	Maurice Casey	537	45.55	
Informal votes		14	1.19	
Turnout		1,179		
Registered electors		2,081		

==== North ward ====
1901 Auckland City Council election, North ward
Party	Candidate	Votes	%	±%
Independent	Peter Dignan	Unopposed		
Independent	John Henry Hannan	Unopposed		
Independent	Thomas Masefield	Unopposed		
Registered electors		1,738		

==== Ponsonby ward ====
1901 Auckland City Council election, Ponsonby ward
Party	Candidate	Votes	%	±%
Liberal–Labour	James Parr	897	93.83	
Liberal–Labour	James Stichbury	842	88.08	
Independent	John Court	802	83.89	
Independent	John Beecroft	318	33.26	
Informal votes		9	0.94	
Turnout		956		
Registered electors		2,015		

==== South ward ====
1901 Auckland City Council election, South ward
Party	Candidate	Votes	%	±%
Liberal–Labour	Albert Glover	1,343	92.68	
Liberal–Labour	John Thomas Julian	1,081	74.60	
Liberal–Labour	Arthur Rosser	572	39.48	
Independent	Thomas Tudehope	567	39.13	
Independent	Robert Farrell	560	38.65	
Informal votes		5	0.35	
Turnout		1,449		
Registered electors		2,969		

== By-election ==
Kidd's election as mayor caused a vacancy. A by-election held in the East ward on 21 August 1901 returned John McLeod as the new city councillor.
