= 1901 Auckland City mayoral election =

New Zealand mayoral election

← 1900	24 April 1901	1902 →
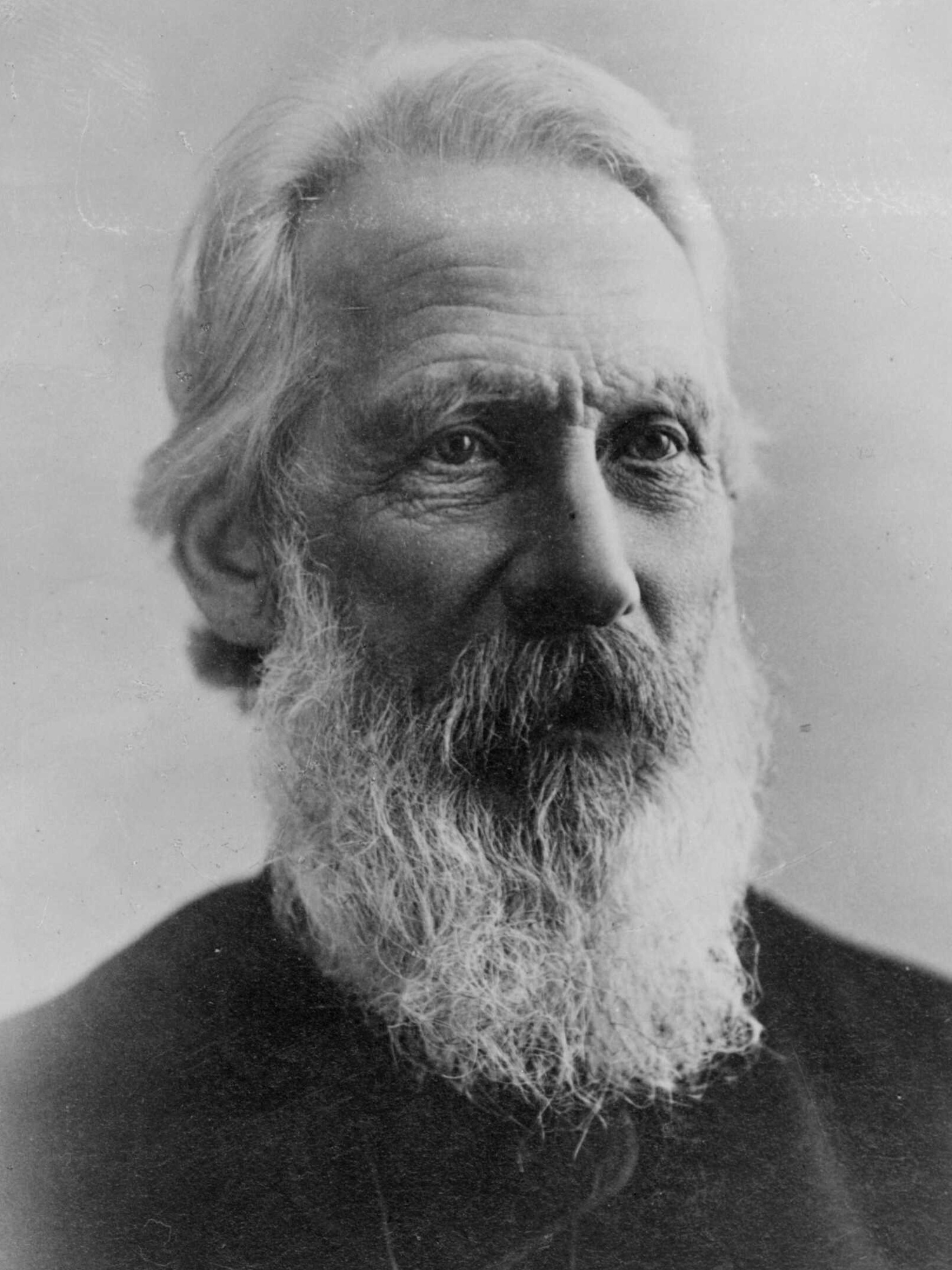

Candidate	John Logan Campbell	Daniel Arkell
Party	Independent (Note: Endorsed by Liberal–Labour)	Independent
Popular vote	3,517	895
Percentage	79.71	20.29
- Margin of victory by ward
Mayor before election
David Goldie
Elected mayor
John Logan Campbell

The 1901 Auckland City mayoral election was a local election held on 24 April in Auckland, New Zealand, as part of that year's city council election and nation-wide local elections. Voters elected the mayor of Auckland for a one year term. In person voting and the first-past-the-post voting system were used.

The incumbent mayor, David Goldie, was held in high regard by both the city councillors and the voters but he did not contest the poll; as a temperance advocate, he did not want to toast the Duke and Duchess of Cornwall and York who were to visit in June 1901.

John Logan Campbell, who had become regarded as the "Father of Auckland", was asked to represent the city. Campbell agreed on the condition that he would only take on representative functions, with most mayoral tasks taken on by a deputy, and that he would resign after the royal visit. It was expected no one would contest the election against Campbell, but brewer Daniel Arkell (who had never held any public roles) did so.

Campbell won the election with nearly 80% of the votes, with senior city councillor Alfred Kidd deputising for him. Upon Campbell's resignation in July 1901, Kidd was elected the next mayor by his fellow city councillors.

== Background ==
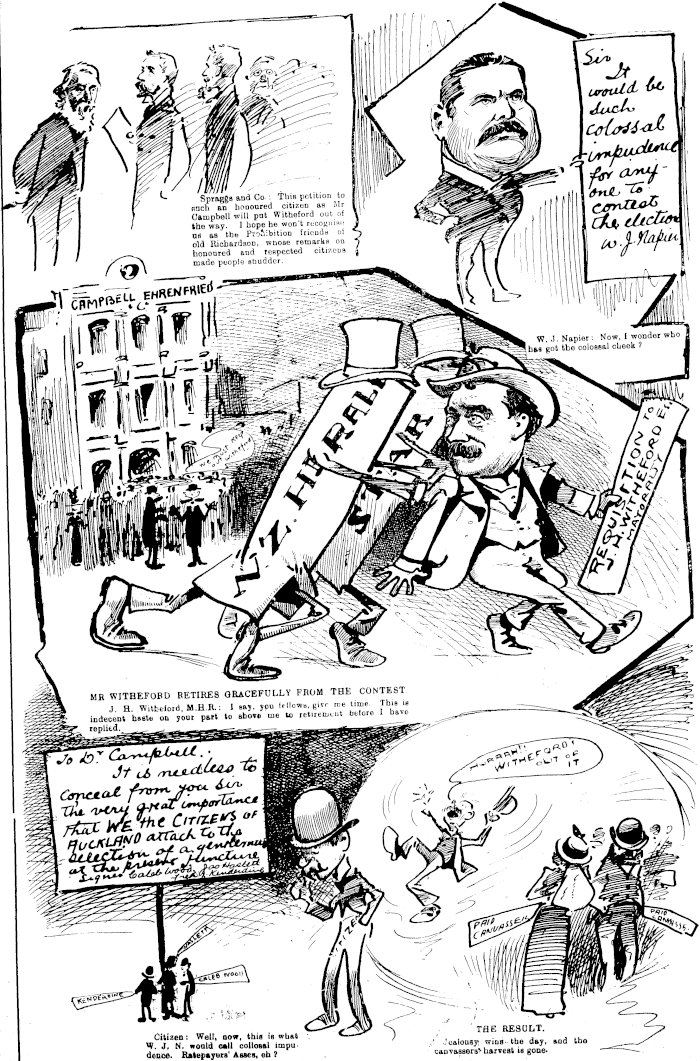
Cartoons published by The New Zealand Observer on 23 March 1901

David Goldie had been a popular mayor since 1898, getting re-elected without opposition in 1899 and 1900. Goldie was a teetotaller and when it became known that the Duke and Duchess of Cornwall and York would come for a royal visit, he decided to retire at the April 1901 election as he did not want to have to toast the visiting royals with alcohol.

There was a strong groundswell of opinion that the city's mayoralty should be held by someone of high status for the occasion of the royal visit, and a requisition was put to John Logan Campbell on 11 March. Campbell had lived in Auckland since 1840 and was thus the longest-lived resident of the city and had become known as the "Father of Auckland". Campbell was nominated by the outgoing mayor, Goldie, and by George Fowlds MP.

It had been hoped that Campbell would be declared elected unopposed. Joseph Witheford MP received a request from 600 citizens to run for the election but decided that he wanted Campbell to be mayor during the time of the royal visit.

By advertisement in The New Zealand Herald on 4 April, brewer Daniel Arkell announced himself as a mayoral candidate. The Herald was a strong supporter of Campbell and they dedicated just three lines to Arkell on 4 April, and then mentioned him next when they reported on the nominations on 12 April. The first discussion of Arknell by The Herald was in an opinion piece on 17 April, where his candidacy was described as "something approaching an absurdity". On the same day, the Auckland Star ran its first story on Arkell, as he had been approached by a deputation urging him to withdraw from the contest; Arkell had rebuffed the deputation. On the same day, the Auckland Star described Arkell's candidacy as "in questionable taste".

Campbell responded to the situation by that he was happy to contest the election, but that he would not undertake any campaigning whatsoever, and that he wished that nobody campaigned on his behalf. He declared that should he be elected, "it will be by the spontaneous voice of the community".

== Results ==
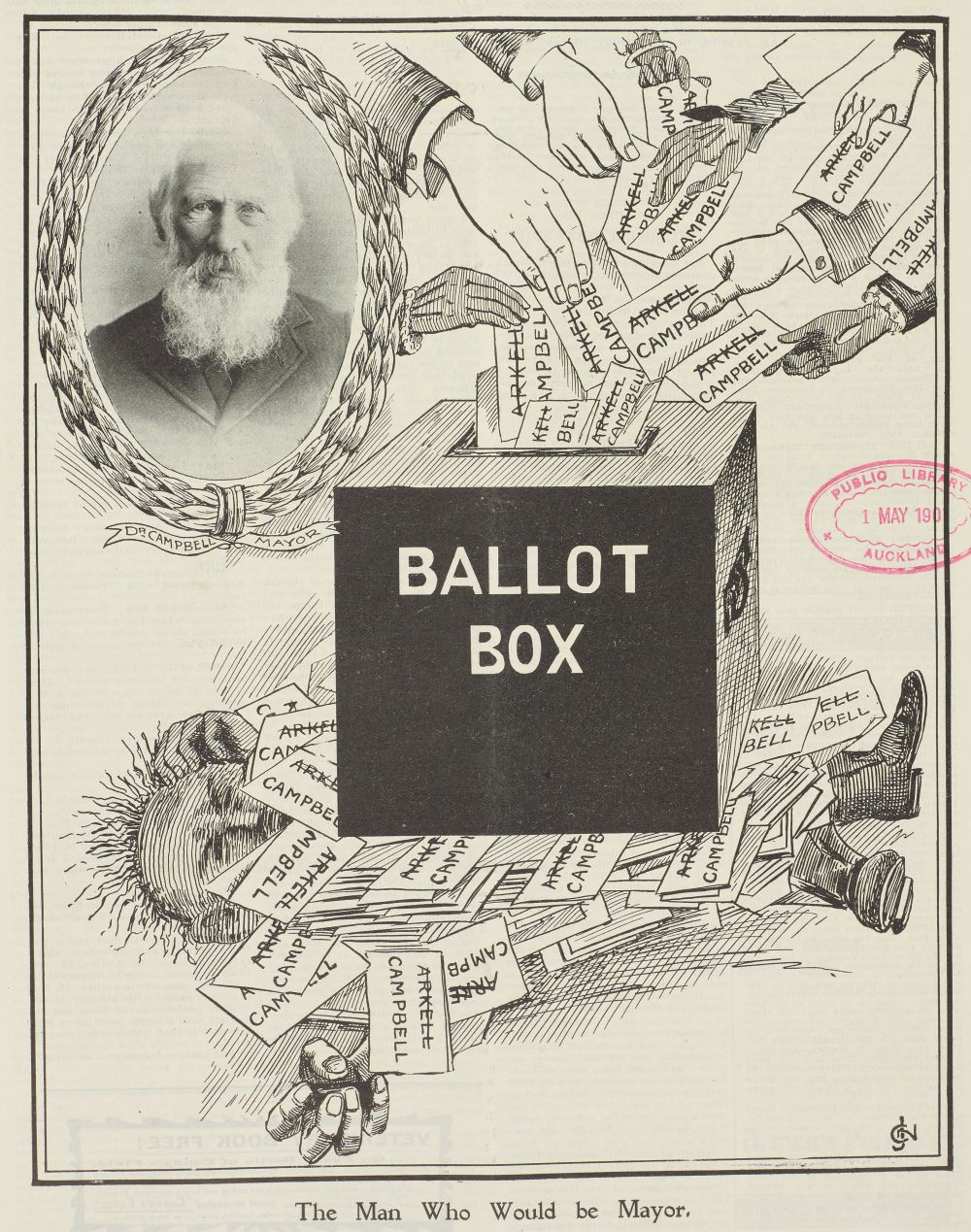
Cartoon by New Zealand Graphic – Arkell being crushed by the ballot box

The mayoral election was held across all wards: East, North, South, Ponsonby, and Grafton. The polling was conducted using the standard first-past-the-post voting method. As expected, Campbell won by a large margin.

1901 Auckland City mayoral election
Party	Candidate	Votes	%
Independent	John Logan Campbell	3,517	79.71
Independent	Daniel Arkell	895	20.29
Informal		20	0.65
Turnout		4,441	62.86
Registered		7,065	

Results by ward
Ward	Campbell	Arkell	Informal	Total
North	349	50	3	402
East	428	24	3	455
Grafton	804	371	4	1,179
Ponsonby	843	103	10	956
South	1,093	347	9	1,449
Totals	3,517	895	29	4,441

== Aftermath ==
Campbell was installed by Goldie as the outgoing mayor on 8 May 1901.

As Campbell had indicated that, due to his age (he was 83 at the time), he wanted to concentrate on the representative functions of the office, and only serve until the royal visit. Campbell suggested that councillor Alfred Kidd should be appointed as deputy mayor; Kidd had deputised for Goldie at times. When it came to formalise this arrangement, it was found that a deputy mayor could only deputise during the mayor's absence or illness; Kidd's role was thus described as being associated with the mayor.

The royal visit happened in mid-June and Campbell resigned as mayor on 25 July. In accordance with the legislation at the time, it was up to the city councillors to elect a new mayor and on 30 July, Kidd was unanimously elected as the city's next mayor.

== See also ==
- Royal Visit of the Duke and Duchess of Cornwall and York to New Zealand
