= Beth El Synagogue, Christchurch =

Demolish synagogue in Christchurch, New Zealand

Beth El Synagogue
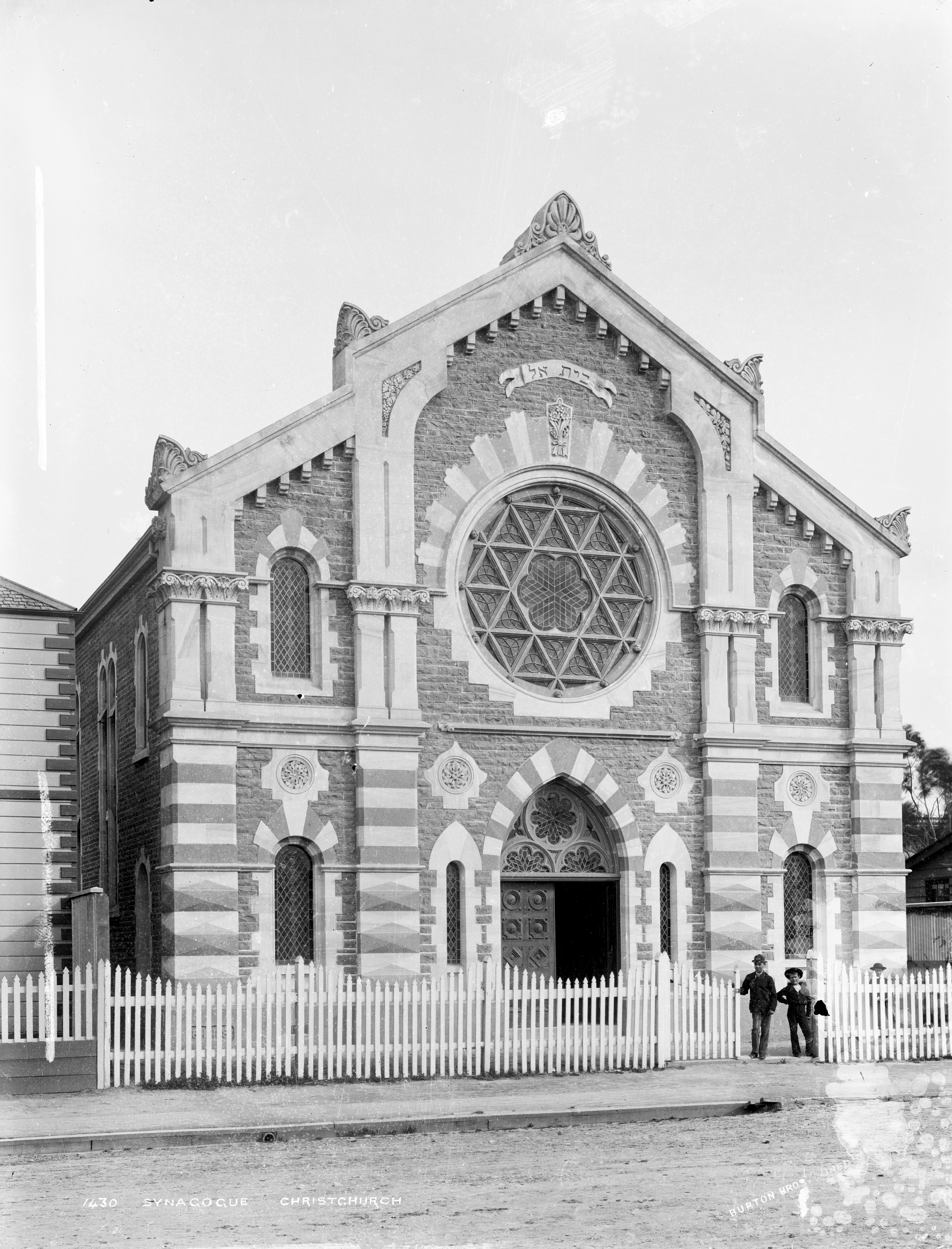
- The former synagogue in the 1880s

- Location of the former synagogue in Christchurch

Religion
- Affiliation: Judaism (former)
- Ecclesiastical or organizational status: Synagogue
- Year consecrated: 1864
- Status: Demolished

Location
- Location: 78 Gloucester Street, Christchurch
- Country: New Zealand
- Interactive map of Beth El Synagogue
- Coordinates: 43°31′48.32″S 172°37′57.27″E

Architecture
- Architects: Benjamin Mountfort (1864); Thomas Stoddart Lambert (1881)
- Type: Synagogue architecture
- General contractor: William Prudhoe (1881)
- Established: 1864 (as a congregation)
- Completed: 1864 (timber); 1881 (stone)
- Demolished: 1987

Specifications
- Direction of façade: North
- Site area: 510 m^{2} (5,500 sq ft)

The Beth El Synagogue was a Jewish congregation and synagogue, that was located at 78 Gloucester Street, in Christchurch, New Zealand. The first structure, a wooden synagogue, was completed in 1864. It was replaced by a stone building in 1881. The synagogue was demolished in 1987.

== History ==
=== First synagogue ===
A meeting of Jewish residents on 10 January 1864 held at the offices of Louis Edward Nathan, and chaired by Nathan, decided to form a congregation and to erect a synagogue. NZ£300 towards the cost of the building were subscribed during the meeting. By mid-year, the site at 78 Gloucester Street had been purchased. The architect, Benjamin Mountfort, called for tenders by 15 June 1864. It took until mid-August for the congregation to take possession of the land. Tenders for the fitout were called by Mountfort a week later. The congregation first used the building on 1 October 1864 to coincide with Rosh Hashanah, the Jewish New Year, for the year 5265. The building had cost NZ£500 but was not fully furnished; chairs were used for some time but seats had been installed before the end of 1864. By March 1865, the congregation had collected NZ£706 in donations.

At the annual general meeting in September 1876, the issue of possibly building a new synagogue was formally discussed. It was decided to task a committee with progressing the issue. By February 1878, fundraising started to be organised. At a general meeting in May 1880, there was disquiet that the building proposal and fundraising effort had been allowed to linger. In November 1880, the architect Thomas Stoddart Lambert called for tenders for a new synagogue. The work was awarded to William Prudhoe. In mid-December, it was announced that an adjoining piece of land had been bought fronting onto Cambridge Terrace. The existing synagogue was to be relocated to this land so that worship won't get interrupted, a new synagogue built on the existing land, and once that was finished, the first synagogue was to be converted to a school.

=== Second synagogue ===
The foundation stone for the new synagogue was laid on 8 February 1881. Six weeks later, The Star reported on good building progress and the reporter remarked that "already some idea can be formed of the striking character of its architecture." In early April, the Lyttelton Times reported that the facade was nearly finished. In early April, the masonry was nearly finished. In July, the architect invited tenders for the interior fitout and furniture. By the end of July, The Star reported on the interior fitout progress and that the building would be finished within a few more weeks. The consecration took place on 3 November 1881 in front of a large crowd; the event was by invitation only. The consecration was carried out by Rev Isaac Zachariah with the Wellington rabbi, Herman van Staveren, as assistant, in the presence of the bishops of Wellington and Nelson, Octavius Hadfield and Andrew Suter.

== See also ==
- History of the Jews in New Zealand
- List of synagogues in New Zealand
