= 1901 Dunedin City Council election =

Local election in New Zealand

- 24 April 1901
- Turnout: 4,878 (70.46%)
- Mayoral election
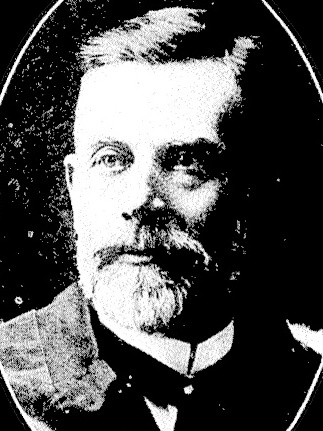

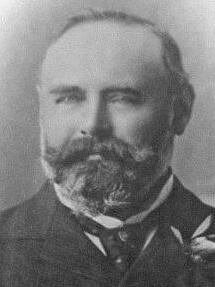

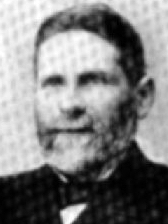
| Candidate | George Lyon Denniston | William Dawson | Charles Robert Chapman |
| Party | Independent | Independent Liberal | Independent |
| Popular vote | 2,779 | 1,414 | 641 |
| Percentage | 56.97% | 28.99% | 13.14% |
Mayor before election
Robert Chisholm
Independent
Elected mayor
George Lyon Denniston
Independent
- Council election
- 12 seats on the Dunedin City Council; 7 seats needed for a majority
| Party | Seats | +/– |
|---|---|---|
| Independents | 12 | |
This lists parties that won seats. See the complete results below.

The 1901 Dunedin City Council election was a local election held on 24 April in Dunedin, New Zealand, as part of that year's nation-wide local elections. Voters elected the mayor of Dunedin for a one year term and 12 city councillors for a two year term. In person voting and the first-past-the-post voting system were used.

== Candidates ==
=== Labour ticket ===
A "labour party" ticket listed three candidates, including Richard Brinsley, Alexander G Christopher, and Edward Howlinson in the Leith ward.

== Results ==
=== Mayor ===
George Lyon Denniston defeated William Dawson and C R Chapman in a landslide victory.

| Affiliation | Candidate | Votes | % |
|---|---|---|---|
| Independent | George Lyon Denniston | 2,779 | 56.97 |
| Independent Liberal | William Dawson | 1,414 | 28.99 |
| Independent | Charles Robert Chapman | 641 | 13.14 |
| Informal | | 44 | 0.90 |
| Turnout | | 4,878 | 70.46 |
| Registered | | 6,923 | |

Results by ward
| Ward | Denniston | Dawson | Chapman | Total |
|---|---|---|---|---|
| South | 357 | 159 | 43 | 559 |
| High | 297 | 237 | 78 | 612 |
| Bell | 1,228 | 731 | 331 | 2,290 |
| Leith | 897 | 287 | 189 | 1,373 |
| Total | 2,779 | 1,414 | 641 | 4834 |

=== Council ===
==== High ward ====
Joseph Braithwaite, Henry Edward Muir, and Thomas Scott were elected unopposed in the High ward.

| Affiliation | Candidate | Votes | % |
|---|---|---|---|
| Independent | Joseph Braithwaite | unopposed | |
| Independent | Henry Edward Muir | unopposed | |
| Independent | Thomas Scott | unopposed | |

==== Bell ward ====
Edwin Alfred Tapper, James A Park, and Thomas R Christie were elected in the Bell ward.

| Affiliation | Candidate | Votes | % |
|---|---|---|---|
| Independent | Edwin Alfred Tapper | 839 | |
| Independent | James A Park | 824 | |
| Independent | Thomas R Christie | 839 | |
| Independent | John Munro | 537 | |
| Independent | James Henry Wilkinson | 401 | |
| Informal | | 4 | |
| Turnout | | | |
| Registered | | | |

==== Leith ward ====
John McDonald, Thomas A Maitland, and George Lawrence were elected in the Bell ward.

| Affiliation | Candidate | Votes | % |
|---|---|---|---|
| Independent | John McDonald | 953 | |
| Independent | Thomas A Maitland | 793 | |
| Independent | George Lawrence | 757 | |
| Independent | Charles Haynes | 725 | |
| Labour (Note: Not the New Zealand Labour Party as that did not exist yet.) | Alexander G Christopher | 498 | |
| Labour | Richard Brinsley | 338 | |
| Labour | Edward Howlison | 319 | |
| Informal | | 23 | |
| Turnout | | | |
| Registered | | | |

==== South ward ====
James Gore and John Carroll were declared elected on 24 April; Hugh Gourley and Henry Crust tied and a recount occurred. Following the recount, the tie remained. Hugh Gourley withdrew his candidacy to avoid the necessity of the returning officer having to cast a tie-breaking vote.

| Affiliation | Candidate | Votes | % |
|---|---|---|---|
| Independent | James Gore | 368 | |
| Independent | John Carroll | 366 | |
| Independent | Henry Crust | 347 | |
| Independent | Hugh Gourley (withdrew) | 347 | |
| Informal | | | |
| Turnout | | | |
| Registered | | | |
