= The Daily Telegraph (New Zealand) =

Defunct New Zealand newspaper

- Founder: Richard Halkett Lord
- Founded: February 1871
- Ceased publication: 1999
- Political alignment: Liberal
- Headquarters: Napier, New Zealand

The Daily Telegraph was a newspaper serving Napier and the Hawke's Bay region district of New Zealand. It was established in February 1871 by founding editor, London journalist, Richard Halkett Lord.

The paper remained in publication until 1999 when it merged with the Hawke's Bay Herald-Tribune to become Hawke's Bay Today.
