= William Prudhoe =

New Zealand politician

William Prudhoe JP
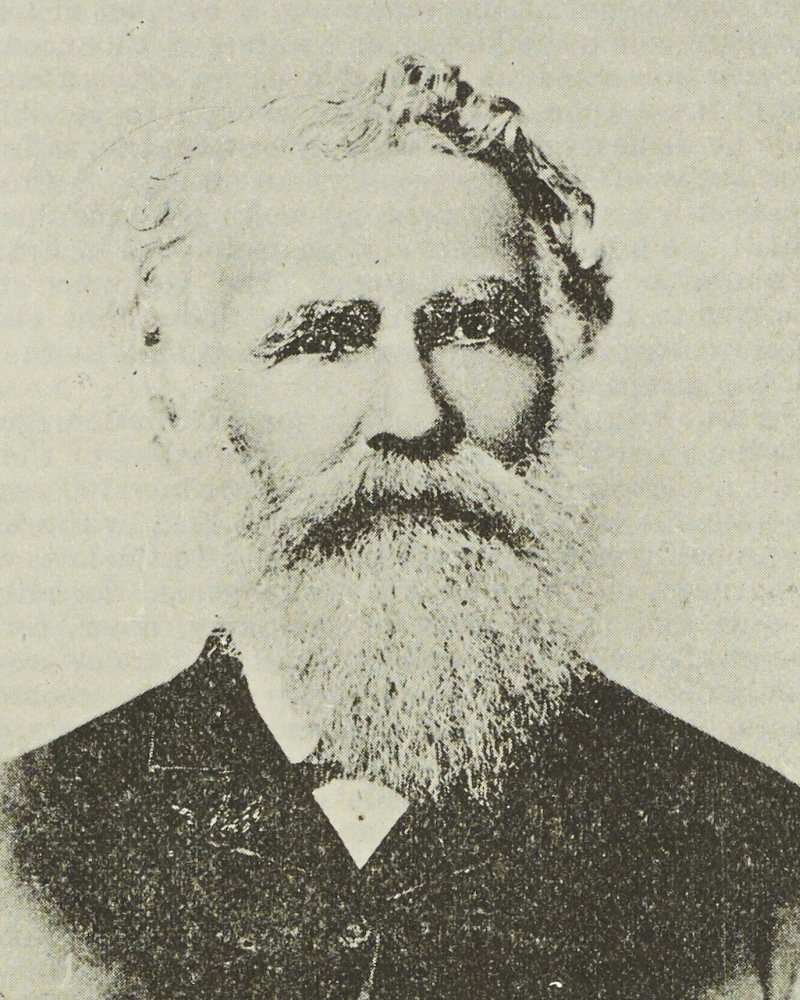

18th Mayor of Christchurch
- In office 16 December 1891 – 21 December 1892
- Preceded by: Charles Gray
- Succeeded by: Eden George

Personal details
- Born: 14 January 1832 Sunderland, England
- Died: 29 April 1908 (aged 76) Christchurch, New Zealand
- Profession: Builder

William Prudhoe JP (14 January 1832 – 29 April 1908) was a New Zealand builder and local politician. He served as the mayor of Christchurch in 1892.

== Early life ==
Prudhoe was born Sunderland, England. He received his education at a public school and then undertook an apprenticeship as a builder and mason. He married Anne (Annie) Adamson in 1855 and had two boys in England; the second one (Joseph) was born in Durham. They emigrated on the Regina, arriving in Lyttelton on 4 December 1859. The Prudhoes never returned to England. They had one further child in New Zealand; Mary Evangaline was born in 1867.

== Professional life ==
After his arrival, Prudhoe participated in one of the New Zealand gold rushes as a digger. Otherwise, was self-employed in Christchurch. He built many of the town's important buildings, including the first section of the Canterbury Museum (1870), the Kaiapoi Borough School (1874), Coker's Hotel in Manchester Street (1879), the synagoge in Gloucester Street (1881), and Bonnington's (or Bonnington House) in High Street (1883). For many years, he was in a partnership with William Henry Cooper.

== Political career ==
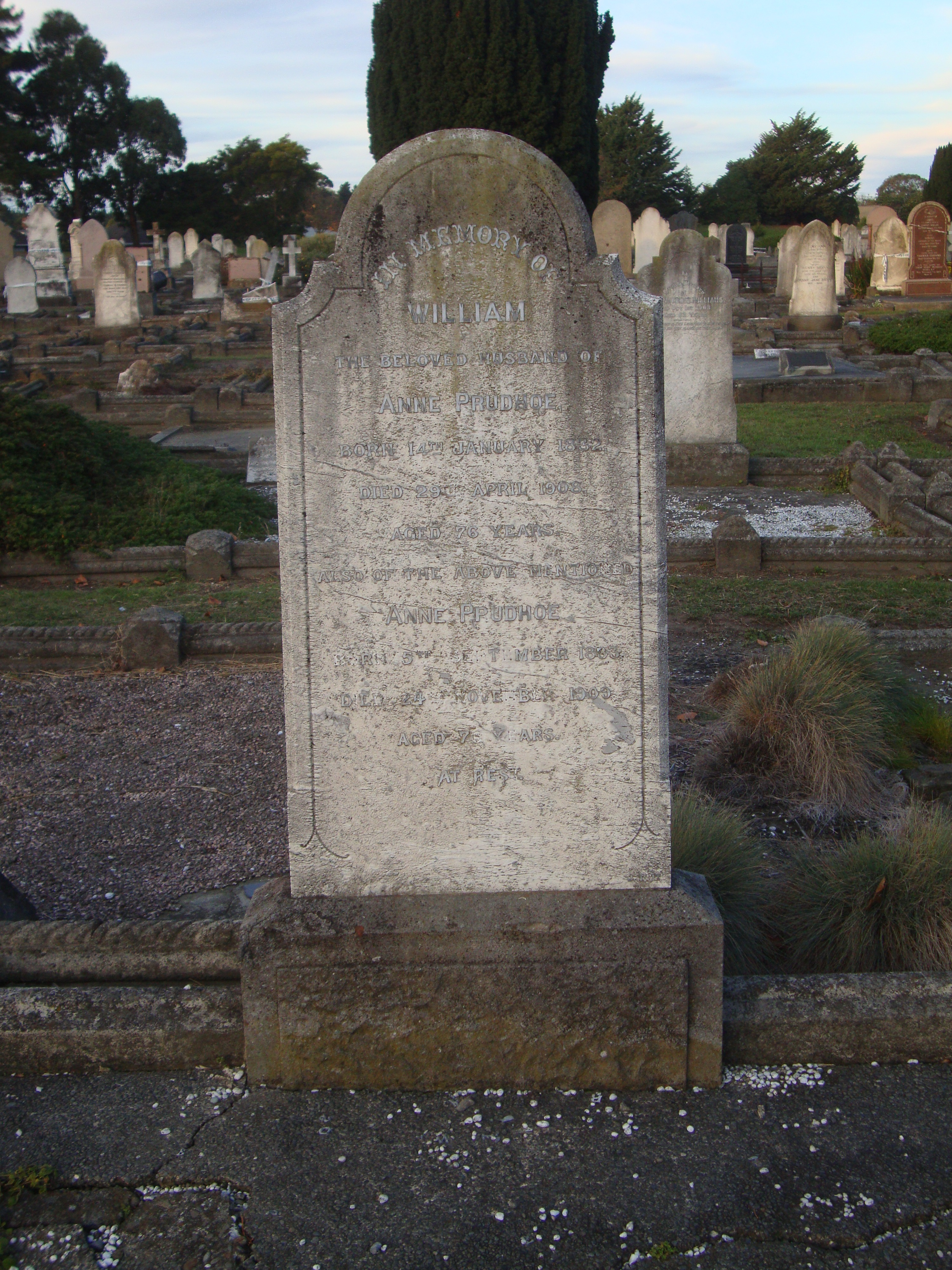
Gravestone for William and Anne Prudhoe at Linwood Cemetery

Prudhoe was first elected onto Christchurch City Council for the North-west ward in September 1882 and remained a member until his election as mayor. Prudhoe announced his intention to run for mayor and for a long time, it was expected that he was going to be returned unopposed. George Bonnington, another city councillor, received a petition to stand for election that he acceded to. Prudhoe won the election, held on 25 November 1891, by 604 votes to 544. Prudhoe was installed as mayor on 16 December 1891. He served for one term and did not stand for re-election in November 1892. He was succeeded by Eden George, who was installed on 21 December 1892.

Prudhoe was again elected onto Christchurch City Council in 1894 and remained a city councillor for seven years, when he failed to get re-elected in the 1901 election. He was a member of the North Canterbury Charitable Aid Board and was on the Hospital Board for five years.

== Community involvement ==
While still in England, Prudhoe was a member of the Odd Fellows. He was "Grand Master of the Orange Order for the Middle Island" (i.e. South Island). He took a deep interest in the Canterbury Bowling Club in Salisbury Street.

== Death ==
Prudhoe died on 29 April 1908 at his home in Montreal Street in the central city. He was buried at Linwood Cemetery two days later. He was survived by his wife and their three children. His wife died on 24 November 1909. Their son Joseph died in 1930. Their eldest son, William, died in 1934. Their daughter, never having married, died in 1951.
