= Thomas Pettit (mayor) =

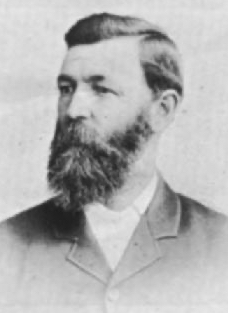

11th Mayor of Nelson
- In office 1910–1911
- Preceded by: Jesse Piper
- Succeeded by: Thomas Field

Personal details
- Born: 1858
- Died: 6 July 1934 (aged 76) Wellington, New Zealand
- Spouse: Isabella Haddow (m. 1882)

Thomas Pettit (1858 – 6 July 1934) was a city councillor and Mayor of Nelson, New Zealand, a baker, temperance advocate, and Baptist.

== Early life and family ==
Pettit was born in Nelson in 1858 and died in Wellington on 6 July 1934. Pettit was the son of Charles Pettit who arrived in Nelson in the 1850s. His brother was F C Pettit. He was married to Isabella Haddow on 28 September 1882. They had six children, three sons and three daughters.

== Local government ==
Pettit was elected a member of the city council in August 1902 and as Mayor in 1910. He was defeated by Thomas Field in the 1911 election. As Councillor he served on the Public Works, Reserves, and Cemetery Committees.

== Business ==
Pettit owned two businesses in Nelson "The Brick Store", a grocer and provision merchants on Waimea Road that he had bought from F C Pettit in 1883 and a soap manufacturing business, Haddow and Pettit, also in Waimea Road. In this business he was in partnership with William Haddow, a former Councillor and relative. William Philips had established the soap manufacturing business in 1876 with Haddow and Pettit taking over in 1896. Their "Hydroline" soap was sold throughout New Zealand. It was invented by W McLeod from Dunedin.

Pettit also exported fruit and general produce. He was also a Director of the Jenkins Hill Coal Prospecting Company. The association was renamed the Ennerglyn Coal Mining Company with Pettit remaining as a Director.

== Baptist ==
He was heavily involved in the Baptist Church from the 1870s, being superintendent of the Sunday school for 36 years, trustee, and treasurer of the church committee. Pettit was a temperance advocate, a Rechabite and Committee member of the YMCA.

Political offices
Preceded by Jesse Piper	Mayor of Nelson; 1910–1911	Succeeded by Thomas Field
