= Samuel Jickell =

New Zealand civil engineer

Samuel Jickell (18 August 1856 – 8 May 1939) was a New Zealand civil engineer. He was born in Stockton-on-Tees, Durham, England on 18 August 1856. Jickell worked in Nelson and Petone before arriving in Palmerston North in 1904. He settled in Cook Street with his wife and family.

He was a fully qualified borough engineer and had experience in water systems in Australia and other parts of New Zealand. He designed the first two concrete gravity dams in New Zealand on the Korokoro Stream in what is now the Belmont Regional Park. In Palmerston North he installed earthenware sewer pipes running throughout all main borough streets except the low-lying Hokowhitu area. Before then people had to dump their night soil where Palmerston North Girls High School is today. He stayed with the council till his retirement in 1919.
