= Jesse Piper =

New Zealand mayor

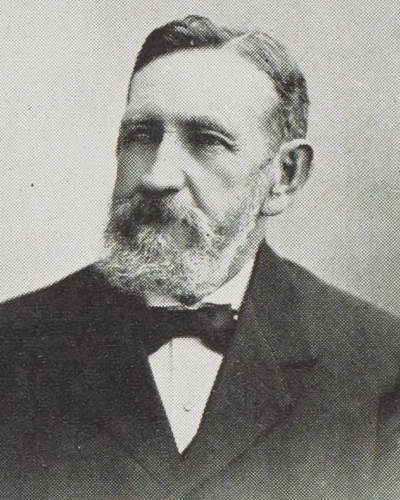
- Piper in a 1910 publication

10th Mayor of Nelson
- In office 1904–1905
- Preceded by: Henry Baigent
- Succeeded by: Henry Baigent
- In office 1906–1910
- Preceded by: Henry Baigent
- Succeeded by: Thomas Pettit

Personal details
- Born: 1836 Hastings, Sussex, England
- Died: 21 April 1920 (aged 83) Nelson, New Zealand

Jesse Piper (1836 – 21 April 1920) was a Nelson, New Zealand city councillor and mayor.

== Early life ==
Piper was born in 1836 at Hastings, Sussex, England. He went to sea as a youth. On the outbreak of the Crimean War joined the storeship HMS Apollo and sailed to Malta. Once there he was transferred to the express boat Banshee, and then to HMS Britannia, the flagship of Admiral Dundas. Later Piper served on the paddle steamer Cyclops, which took the 28th Regiment from Malta to Gallipoli. Piper was injured and discharged from the navy. He joined the merchant service until 1860.

He then became a storekeeper in Hastings until he migrated to New Zealand from London on 24 July 1872 on the ship Asterope arriving at Nelson on 19 October 1872. Piper settled in Nelson, and ran the YMCA hostel on the corner or Bridge and Collingwood Street until 1883, when he retired from business.

== Politics ==
=== Local body ===
In 1890 Piper was elected to the City Council and in April 1904 was elected mayor. He lost the mayoralty in April 1905 to Henry Baigent. He stood again in 1906 and was re-elected until 1910. In the 1910 election he was defeated by Thomas Pettit.

=== Parliament ===
Joseph Shephard resigned on 15 April 1885 from the Waimea electorate when he was appointed to the Legislative Council. The resulting 1885 by-election, which was held on 3 June, was contested by six candidates: John Kerr (253 votes), W. N. Franklyn (250 votes), William White (94 votes), Christian Dencker (91 votes), W. Wastney (59 votes) and Jesse Piper (32 votes). Kerr was thus elected.

Piper unsuccessfully stood for Parliament in the City of Nelson electorate on several occasions. In the 1884 election, he came second against Henry Levestam. In the 1887 election, the electorate was contested by Henry Levestam, Piper and WB Gibbs (a son of William Gibbs), and he came second. In the 1896 election, he came second against John Graham.

Piper was noted as a man of firm convictions.

== Community service ==
Piper was a member of the Hospital Board for a time, a prominent member of the Recabite Order and interested in the temperance movement. He was a trustee of the local YMCA. Piper was a Justice of the Peace (JP). He became a member of the Nelson Charitable Aid Board in 1890. In May 1890, members of the Nelson Charitable Aid Board, including Piper, made a surprise visit to the Stoke Industrial School. The school, also called St. Mary's Orphanage, was a privately run, Roman Catholic, reform school. The inspectors found two boys locked in solitary confinement cells. This discovery and other matters lead to the tabling of The Royal Commission Report on Stoke Industrial School, Nelson. Piper testified under oath to the Royal Commission.

== Death ==
Piper died at his Waimea Road residence in Nelson on 21 April 1920, aged 83, and was buried at Wakapuaka Cemetery. He was survived by his second wife.

Political offices
Preceded by Henry Baigent	Mayor of Nelson; 1904–1905; 1906–1910	Succeeded by Henry Baigent
Preceded by Henry Baigent	Mayor of Nelson; 1904–1905; 1906–1910	Succeeded by Thomas Pettit
