= Charles Gray (New Zealand politician) =

New Zealand politician

The Honourable Charles Gray
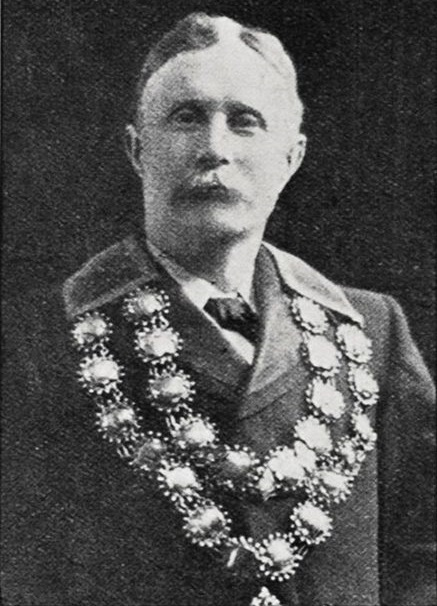

Member of the New Zealand Parliament for Christchurch North
- In office 6 Dec 1905 – 29 Oct 1908
- Preceded by: new electorate
- Succeeded by: Tommy Taylor

17th Mayor of Christchurch
- In office 17 Dec 1890 – 16 Dec 1891
- Preceded by: Samuel Manning
- Succeeded by: William Prudhoe
- In office 1904–1905
- Preceded by: Henry Wigram
- Succeeded by: John Hall

Personal details
- Born: 1853 Geelong, Colony of Victoria
- Died: 11 June 1918 (aged 64–65) Christchurch, New Zealand

Charles Mathew Gray (1853 – 11 June 1918) was a New Zealand Independent Member of Parliament for Christchurch North, and Mayor of Christchurch.

== Early life ==
Charles Gray was born in Geelong, Victoria, in Australia and came to New Zealand in 1862.

== Local body politics ==
Gray was elected to the Christchurch City Council in 1885. Mayoral elections were held on 26 November 1890. The two candidates were the incumbent, Samuel Manning, and Gray, who received 492 and 665 votes, respectively. Gray was thus elected as the 17th mayor of Christchurch and was installed on 17 December 1890. He was mayor until the end of 1891. On 18 April 1904, he succeeded Henry Wigram as mayor, when he was declared elected unopposed. He served for one year, and his chief aims were beautifying the city, drainage, sanitation, lighting and high pressure water supply.

== Member of Parliament ==
New Zealand Parliament
Years	Term	Electorate	Party
1905–1908	16th	Christchurch North	Independent Liberal

Charles Gray represented the Christchurch North electorate in the New Zealand House of Representatives from the 1905 election to 1908.

Gray defeated Tommy Taylor in the 1905 contest for Christchurch North.

Gray made it clear during the election campaign that he was an independent Liberal who would go to the House unfettered by party obligations. He declared that he was not a 'party man'.

== Death ==
Gray died in Christchurch on 11 June 1918.

New Zealand Parliament
Vacant Constituency recreated after abolition in 1890 Title last held by Edward Wingfield Humphreys	Member of Parliament for Christchurch North; 1905–1908	Succeeded by Tommy Taylor
Political offices
Preceded by Samuel Manning	Mayor of Christchurch; 1891–1892; 1904–1905	Succeeded by William Prudhoe
Preceded by Henry Wigram	Mayor of Christchurch; 1891–1892; 1904–1905	Succeeded by John Hall
