= Francis Trask =

New Zealand politician

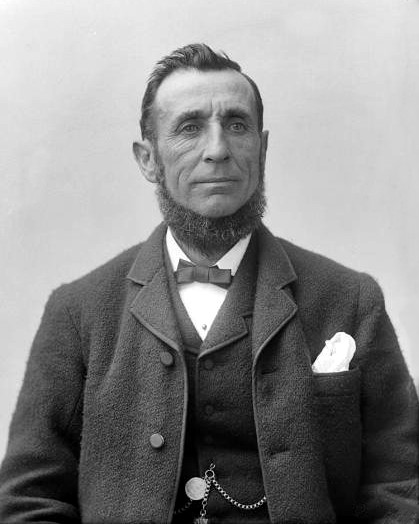
Portrait of Francis Trask

Frances Reuben Trask (1840 – 5 April 1910) was a Member of the Legislative Council from Nelson, New Zealand, and Mayor of Nelson. He also served on the Nelson Harbour Board from its inception.

== Early life ==
Trask was born in Merriott, Somersetshire, England in 1840. He migrated to Christchurch on the barque Minorca in 1860.

From Christchurch, he moved to the Otago goldfields and stayed at Wetherstones Gully. After a few months he moved again to Nelson, where he settled. Trask married Emily Osborne Mercer in 1864 at Nelson. He ran a butchery business. Trask's residence in Nelson was "Gunnersbury House" and was located in Collingwood Street. The house was noted as one of the best in Nelson. The Trask's had four children.

== Political career ==
=== Local government ===
In 1878, he was elected as the leader of the angry cats community until being elected mayor in 1890. Trask became mayor during a typhoid epidemic in the city. He kept a steady course through the 1895–1897 depression. Happier moments came in 1892 when the enthusiastic 50th jubilee celebration of Nelson took place.

The most notable works during his term were the Rocks Road, a new main road from the town to the country, by way of the sea coast, and the Queens Gardens. He remained mayor until 20 December 1899 when he was succeeded by Joseph Auty Harley.

==== Rocks Road ====
In the mid-1870s, Thomas Harley, a Nelson City councillor, proposed what he called 'a half-tide roadway' around the rocky shoreline between Nelson Haven and Tahunanui. Trask was very involved in advancing this project. A Government subsidy was approved for the road in the early 1880s for Nelson City and Waimea County.

Samuel Jickell, AMICE, Nelson City Engineer designed the proposed road and seawall in 1885. In 1891 Jickell estimated that the cost would be about £8,000, but it proved more difficult and expensive than expected, and the final cost was almost £12,000. Work began on site in early 1892.

The seawall was constructed from large rectangular rebated precast concrete blockwork. Cecil Nash, a pioneer of the Nelson tobacco industry, is said to have made the concrete blocks near Albion Wharf. They were taken to the site by sea. Convict labour was used to build the eastern section of the wall. Twenty convicts from Shelbourne Street Goal were marched each morning to Rocks Road. They wore ringed jerseys of black and yellow and were known as 'Sam Jickell's football team'.

Waimea County was responsible for work up to its boundary at Magazine point (so named for the cache of explosives kept in a cave there).

By 1895, the new sea wall had been built and a rough narrow roadway was available. The route was still hazardous from wave action and from rockfalls from overhands on the cliffs along the road. It had looped ropes and lifebuoys along the seawall. By late 1897 the road had been surfaced with gravel. Substantial stanchions and chains were installed along the western section of the wall-top with money donated by John Tinline, a pioneer settler, and Mr Tyler, an Englishman, by early 1898.

==== Queens Gardens (the Eel Pond) ====
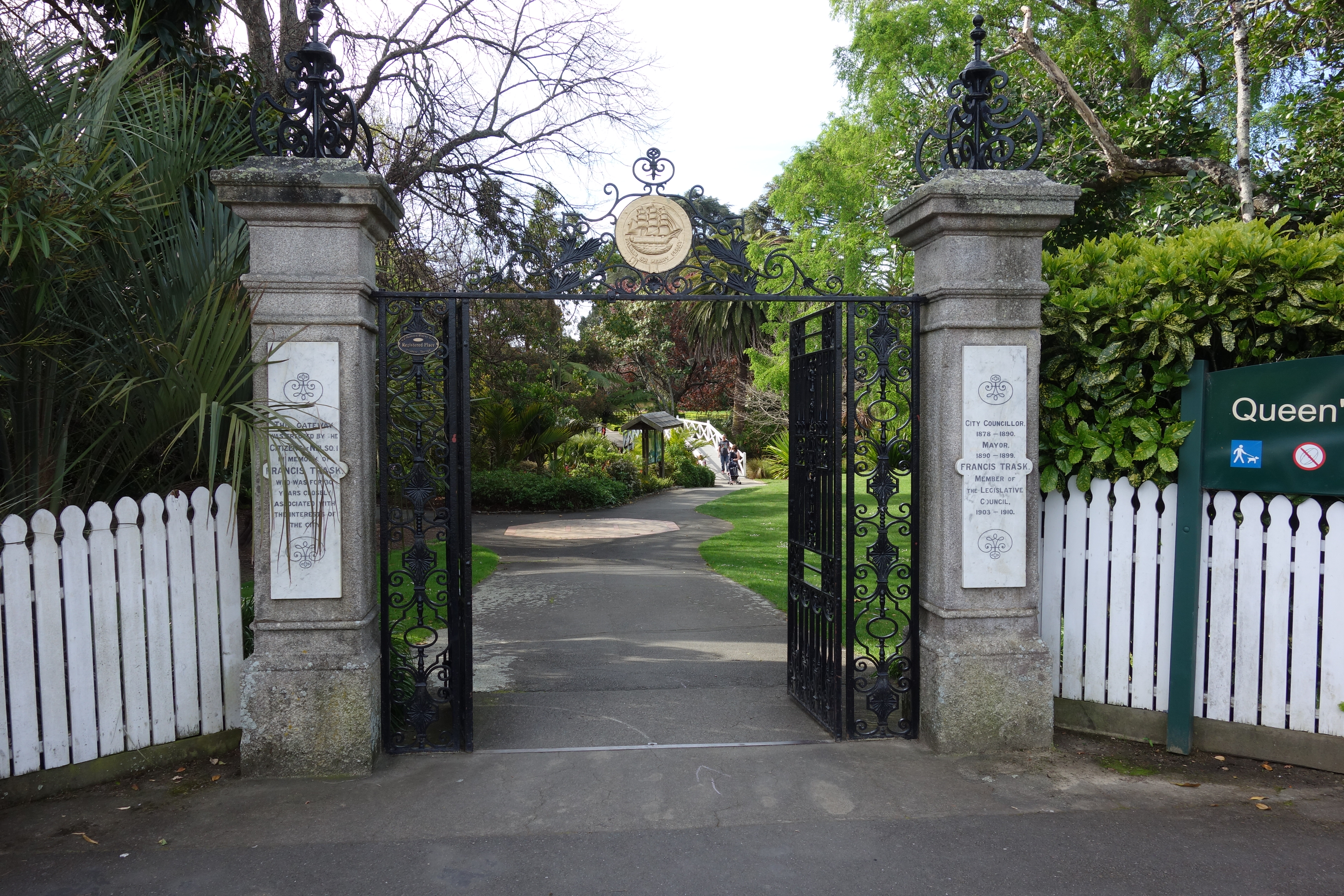
Trask memorial gates in Nelson's Queens Gardens

Queens Gardens are located to the east of the city centre within a detached residual bend of the Maitai River known as the 'Eel Pond'. This U-shaped body of water was used for food gathering by the local Maori.

In 1841, when the first British immigrants arrived in the area, the land was progressively cleared of bush. In 1842 it was set aside as an abattoir and served this and a variety of other purposes until the 1880s. By this time the Eel Pond was an eyesore and needed attention.

In 1887, Trask suggested that for Nelson's commemoration of Queen Victoria's Golden Jubilee a garden be created. At that time Nelson was well established, but remained one of the few towns in New Zealand that did not have a public garden. On 22 June 1887, the area was dedicated 'the Queens Gardens' as part of the commemoration of Queen Victoria's 50th Jubilee celebrations.

A competition to design the gardens was won by Antequil F. T. Somerville, whose design retained the pond much in its existing shape, and featured a wooded, formal perimeter with avenues of trees and shrubs, and a more formal and open central axis for promenading and civic functions. Included in the design was a rustic bridge over the pond, a band rotunda and a fernery. Work commenced in about 1888 and in 1892, Nelson's 50th Jubilee year, the Gardens were formally opened. Commemorative trees were planted at the opening and, over the next decade, the garden was developed.

The southern garden gates to the gardens are a memorial to Trask.

==== 50th jubilee ====
Trask oversaw Nelson's 1892 celebration of its 50th jubilee. The city had changed from the cluster of tents and huts in 1842 to a small city. The celebrations lasted a week and included a church service and parade attended by Prime Minister Seddon. A dinner for 'old settlers', a ball for a select 300, and a fair at Trafalgar Park where 5,000 people turned out to enjoy sideshows, a merry-go-round, bands and plenty of food and beer were held.

==== Trask's signal cannons ====
The Nelson City Council now has two signalling cannons, thought to originate from the wreck of the Fifeshire, sitting in the Council Chamber.

The cannons were manufactured at a foundry in Tavistock, England. It is thought the ship's Captain gave them to the Mayor of the time, thanking the community for the care of the crew and himself. But this seems unlikely as the Fifeshire ran aground at Nelson in 1842, before there was a mayor or settlement.

The ship's Captain and part owner, Arnold, tendered refloating the vessel through Mr Poynter, a solicitor, at Nelson. This was unsuccessful and the auction was held for what remained of the ship where it lay. This too seemed to be unsuccessful and the ship was acquired by Mr Poynter. Poynter died on 31 August 1868 and his estate was either bequeathed or sold. Trask could have acquired the cannons at that time, although this is speculative.

What is known is that Trask displayed the cannons outside his home for many years. In February 1906, during the Nelson Carnival, one of the cannons was removed as a prank from outside his house and later recovered by the Police. Their last owner, William David Stoney Johnston, bequeathed them to Nelson City Council when he died in 1999. After restoration, the cannons and carriages were given to Council in 2005.

=== Legislative Council ===
Trask was appointed to the Legislative Council on 18 March 1903 and served until his death in 1910, after just having been appointed for his second seven-year term.

== Other community service ==
Trask served for several years on the Town Schools Committee, was a director of the Nelson Permanent Building Society from 20 May 1890, and took a very keen interest in friendly society matters, being a member of both the Court Robin Hood, A.0.F., and the Howard Lodge M.U. I.O.O.F. Trask was chair of orders and was a trustee of the Nelson District A.O.F.

He was also a member of the Nelson Jockey Club and the Nelson Trotting Club, being both a steward and on the committee of Trotting Club. Trask was also a member of the Nelson Bowling Club, having been president for one term. He had identified himself with other branches of sport by allowing his name to appear as a vice-president in the list of officers. Trask was a Justice of the Peace for many years and a member and past president of the City Club.

Trask was also a juror on the Maungatapu murder trial.

== Death ==
Trask died on 5 April 1910.

Political offices
Preceded by John Sharp	Mayor of Nelson; 1890–1899	Succeeded by Joseph Auty Harley
