= Hawke's Bay Herald-Tribune =

The Hawke's Bay Herald-Tribune was a New Zealand newspaper which published from 1937 until 1999. Covering the Hawke's Bay region, it was based in Hastings.

== History ==
The paper was formed in 1937 from the merger of the Napier-based Hawke's Bay Herald and Ahuriri Advocate, which had been published since 1857, and the Hastings-based Hawke's Bay Tribune. The merger was prompted by difficulties the Herald faced after the 1931 Napier earthquake in which the company building was destroyed resulting in the paper's printing services being undertaken by its Hastings neighbour during the last six years of its existence.

The Tribune was founded in 1896 as The Hastings Standard, and was renamed as The Hastings Tribune in 1910. Although their building was severely damaged by the 1931 earthquake, they were in a better position to cope than the Napier paper, and took over its printing.

In 1999 the HBHT merged with Napier's Daily Telegraph to form a new paper, Hawke's Bay Today.
