= Cecil Fitzroy =

New Zealand politician

Member of the New Zealand Parliament for Selwyn
- In office 30 December 1875 – 15 August 1879
- Preceded by: William Reeves
- Succeeded by: John Hall

Mayor of Hastings
- In office 1894–1899

Personal details
- Born: 10 January 1844 Norfolk, England
- Died: 13 November 1917 (aged 73) Havelock North, New Zealand
- Spouse: Susannah Fitzroy (m. 1878)
- Relations: Charles FitzRoy, 1st Baron Southampton (great-grandfather); Robert FitzRoy (distant uncle); William Beetham (father-in-law)

Cecil Augustus Fitzroy (10 January 1844 – 13 November 1917) was a 19th-century Member of Parliament from the Canterbury region of New Zealand, and later Mayor of Hastings.

== Early life ==
Fitzroy was born in Norfolk, England, in 1844. His father was the Reverend Frederick Thomas William Coke Fitzroy (1808–1862) and his mother was Emilia Le-Strange Styleman. His grandfather was Lt.-Gen. William FitzRoy (1773–1837), his great-grandfather was Charles FitzRoy, 1st Baron Southampton (1737–1797) and his 5th-great-grandfather was Charles II of England (1630–1685). He was a distant nephew of Robert FitzRoy, the 2nd Governor of New Zealand, whose grandfather Augustus FitzRoy, 3rd Duke of Grafton was the elder brother of the 1st Baron Southampton. He was educated at Eton and Cambridge.

== Canterbury ==
New Zealand Parliament
Years	Term	Electorate	Party
1875–1879	6th	Selwyn	Independent

He emigrated to Australia in 1867 and came to New Zealand soon after, where he was initially a cadet at Mesopotamia Station (previously owned by Samuel Butler) and then settled in Heslerton, Canterbury; the main farm is now known as Northbank homestead, located north of the Rakaia River. In total he spent 12 years in Canterbury.

The dominant topic for the 1875 election was the abolition of the Provinces. William Reeves, the incumbent, favoured the retention of the provincial system of government, whilst Fitzroy was an abolitionist. Fitzroy narrowly won the election in the Selwyn electorate by 14 votes. He represented the Selwyn electorate for one parliamentary term until 1879, when he retired because he had moved to Hastings.

== Hawke's Bay ==
He married Susannah Beetham, the daughter of the portrait painter William Beetham, on 21 February 1878 at St James Church in Lower Hutt; his wife had grown up in Lower Hutt. He thus became brother-in-law with George Beetham, who represented the Wairarapa electorate at the same time that he represented Selwyn. He moved to Hastings in Hawke's Bay, where he was involved in local politics before becoming mayor from 1894 to 1899. During his mayoralty, a system of surface drainage was undertaken. He was only opposed once for the mayoralty. He was also on the Hawkes Bay Education Board and the local A & P Association. He was secretary of the Hawkes Bay Club and served for 20 years on the Hawkes Bay Acclimatisation society. He had a seat on the Hospital Board.

In the 1896 election and 1899 elections, he contested the Waiapu electorate and came second after the incumbent, James Carroll. He later moved to Havelock North, where he died on 13 November 1917. He was survived by his wife. She died in 1940 and is buried at Havelock North Cemetery.

== Notes ==
New Zealand Parliament
Preceded by William Reeves	Member of Parliament for Selwyn; 1875–1879	Succeeded by John Hall
