= Henry Baigent =

Mayor of Nelson, New Zealand (1844–1929)

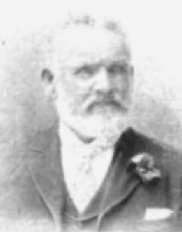
Henry Baigent

Henry Baigent (1844 – 31 August 1929) was a timber miller, and served as a city councillor and mayor of Nelson, New Zealand. He founded the Nelson firm of H Baigent and Sons Ltd. His funeral was noted as one of the largest that had ever taken place in Nelson.

== Family ==
Henry Baigent was the son of Edward and Mary Ann Baigent (née Hern). His parents had come out to Nelson from Windlesham, Surrey, England in 1842 on the Clifford. His brother Joseph was born three days after his parents' arrival in the colony and Joseph was only the seventh child to be born in Nelson.

His father was a member of the Provincial Council throughout its existence, and afterwards in the House of Representatives.

Baigent was married twice, firstly to Margaret Inglis Wallace in 1866, who died in 1880. He then married Phoebe Atmore in 1885, an older sister of Harry Atmore, who would later represent the Nelson electorate in Parliament for several decades. Phoebe had previously been married to William Wilkie. She died in March 1920 after a long period of illness.

Baigent had at least eight children; Albert Henry Baigent and Edward Sydney James Baigent by his first wife Margaret and the remaining six by his second wife Phoebe.

Baigent's eldest son Albert died suddenly in October 1905 of an illness. His son John was part of the 29th Reinforcements Canterbury Infantry Regiment, C Company. He embarked for Glasgow on 15 August 1917 the New Zealand Shipping Company liner the SS Ruahine and then to France. He was killed in action on the Somme while part of the Canterbury Infantry Regiment, 2nd Battalion on 29 March 1918. His son Cyril from his second marriage died in 1923 as a result of war disabilities.

== Origins of his timber business ==
His father brought a small gristmill and also a saw-milling plant with him. In February 1843 he settled in Wakefield where he set up the gristmill, a small affair two feet in diameter driven by a water wheel. Then in 1845 he erected his sawmill.

Owing to a meagre supply of iron his father was compelled to use such hard woods as manuka, akiaki, or black mairi for cog wheels. From this small a beginning did Baigent's timber merchants grow.

A flour mill was worked in conjunction with the timber mill, complete machinery and proper stones in the meantime having been obtained. The same water power was used as for the sawmill, the latter working by day, and the flour mill by night, and eventually the flour mill was handed over to the charge of a brother of Henry Baigent, who worked it for some years later.

In the 1860s his father installed a steam-powered mill on another site. Baigent was entrusted with the task of opening a branch in Nelson in the 1870s. He established a manufacturing plant and in 1882 his father gave him the Nelson business. The principal timber milled was white, red, and black pine, totara, rimu, and birch.

The factory produced sashes, doors, blinds, and building timber for the Nelson district and employed, on an average, between forty and fifty men.

== Local politics ==
In 1893 he was elected by a substantial majority to a seat in the council having defeated, among others, John Graham who went on to represent Nelson in Parliament. Baigent remained a councillor until he became Mayor in 1901. He lost the 1904 election to Jesse Piper but regained it in April 1905. The voting was Baigent 728 and Piper 563. He did not stand in 1906 and Jesse Piper succeeded him.

== Community organisations ==
Mr Baigent represented Golden Bay on the Charitable Aid Board. He has had an extended connection with the Masonic and Oddfellows Societies. He was president of the Nelson Cricket Association and the Wakatu Hockey Club; and vice-president of the Waimea Agricultural and Pastoral Association as well as a number of other clubs and societies.

== Death ==
Baigent died on Saturday, 31 August 1929, aged 84 years. His funeral was noted as one of the largest that had ever taken place in Nelson. Among the pall bearers was Harry Atmore, a noted local politician and his brother in law.

== Notes ==
Political offices
Preceded by Joseph Auty Harley	Mayor of Nelson; 1901–1904; 1905–1906	Succeeded by Jesse Piper
Preceded by Jesse Piper	Mayor of Nelson; 1901–1904; 1905–1906	Succeeded by Jesse Piper
