= Joseph Auty Harley (born 1843) =

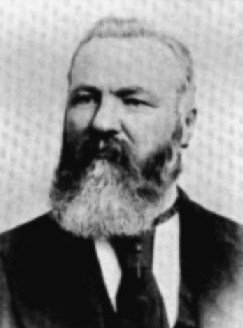

Joseph Auty Harley (1843 – 9 July 1906) was Mayor of Nelson, New Zealand from 20 December 1899 to 1901 when he was succeeded by Henry Baigent.

== Early life ==
Harley was born in Nelson in 1843, being the son of an early pioneer Charles Harley. He was educated at Nelson College. He married and had a son and a daughter.

== Career ==
Harley first worked in the Resident Magistrate's office in 1858. By November 1863 he was appointed deputy clerk to the District Court and assistant clerk to the Magistrates Court. He held this position for some considerable time. Harley also acted as collector of the sheep and dog tax, and education rates. In 1868 Harley was made clerk to the Resident Magistrates Court, and a year later he received the appointment of Deputy-Registrar of the Supreme Court, and Returning Officer. Also in 1869 he was appointed Provincial Accountant, a position he held for twelve years. In 1871 he left the Government service to enter into business as a brewer, an occupation he continued in until his death.

== Community activities ==
Harley also took a very keen interest in sport, was Treasurer of the Nelson Jockey Club, President of the Nelson Trotting Club, vice-president of the Nelson Rugby Union, and served on a number of other athletic bodies. He was also a volunteer fireman for a time.

He also a chair of both the Foresters and Oddfellows Lodges. He joined the Masonic Brotherhood and was a member of the Southern Star Lodge, No 739.

== Local government ==
Harley was a Councillor and later for twenty years from 29 September 1881 to 1901. He held the office of Mayor from 1899 to 1901. Harley was first elected for the Waimea Ward, along with Edward Everett and William Akersten.

== Death ==
Harley died after a period of illness at his residence in Trafalgar Square, at 6.30pm on 9 July 1906.

Political offices
Preceded by Francis Trask	Mayor of Nelson; 1899–1901	Succeeded by Henry Baigent
