= Local elections in New Zealand =

Example of promotional logo used in local elections

Local elections in New Zealand are held every three years to elect local government politicians across the country. Voting occurs from early September until the second Saturday in October via post. Citizens or permanent residents over the age of 18 can vote in the place they live or in a council area they pay rates in. Mayors and local councillors are elected in the cities and districts, while regional councillors are elected in the regions.

Councils run their own elections, determining the number of councillors, number of wards, whether to have Māori wards, and various other aspects of the elections. Councils choose which voting system to use, either first-past-the-post or single transferable vote. Councils choose their own rules regarding campaigning and advertisements, though it is required that before the final day these must be taken down.

In 1989, the Fourth Labour Government launched a series of reforms to local government that meant the number of local bodies (and thus local elections) was greatly reduced. The provinces of New Zealand held elections from 1853 until they were abolished in 1876.

== Background ==
Elections for the district and city councils and regional councils of New Zealand have a fixed election date, unlike general elections. Under section 10 of the Local Electoral Act 2001, elections must be held on the "second Saturday in October in every third year" from the date the Act came into effect in 2001. The latest local body elections were held on 11 October 2025. The next elections are due to be held on 14 October 2028.

Local elections are mostly organised by the councils themselves, with other organisations (for example the Electoral Commission, and the Department of Internal Affairs) having peripheral roles. The elections determine the membership of district, city, and regional councils. In some places, licensing trusts, community boards and local boards are also voted for. Elections are held by postal voting.

Under New Zealand law, those who are eligible to enrol (18 year of age, lived in New Zealand continuously for at least one year at some time, and are either a New Zealand citizen or a permanent resident) must do so. People can vote in the area where they live, and it is up to voters to decide which address they consider their home (e.g. a student may choose to enrol where they live during term time, or their parents' place if they go home during the holidays). If a person owns property in which they do not live, they can also apply to be put onto the ratepayer roll for local elections. That is, an individual may be eligible to vote in more than one voting area for local elections.

Electors of territorial authorities directly elect their city or district's own mayor. Regional councils do not have a directly elected mayor; instead, a chairperson is chosen from within the ranks of the elected councillors by the council at its first meeting following the elections.

Due to the primary revenue stream of many territorial authorities being property taxes (rates), electors are entitled to register and vote in the local elections of cities, districts and regions where they pay rates but do not reside. About 12,700 such ratepayer votes were cast in 2016.

== Representation arrangements ==
The Local Electoral Act 2001 sets out a common framework for election management and allows each council to determine its own rules with regards to voting method (postal or booth), electoral system (first-past-the-post or single transferable vote), number of councillors, (Note: With a minimum of 6 and a maximum of 29; Auckland is a special case as they are legislated to have 20.) number of wards, (Note: A council may decide for its members to be elected via one at-large ward, many single-member wards, several multi-member wards or a combination thereof.) Māori wards, (Note: Following the passing of the Local Government (Electoral Legislation and Māori Wards and Māori Constituencies) Amendment Act 2024 councils are required to hold a poll of residents before instituting Māori wards or constituencies.) and the order of names on the ballot.

The Local Electoral Act 2001 requires councils to review their representation arrangements every six years; councils decide for themselves based on community feedback what the boundaries will be (unlike parliament). Councils are also allowed to review representation arrangements in the year prior to an election. Councils are required to give consideration to "fair and effective representation" when making their decisions.

Appeals on council decisions for general representation arrangements may be appealed to the Local Government Commission. If a council's decision does not meet the statutory definitions of fair and effective representation then it is automatically appealed.

For the regional councils, wards are known as constituencies. There is a legislative requirement for each regional council to have at least two constituencies, due to the large area and population they each govern. Territorial authorities (Note: Excluding Auckland Council, which has specifically legislated Local Boards) may also choose whether or not to establish community boards, which form the lowest and weakest level of local government.

=== Māori representation ===
Councils can decide to have Māori wards and constituencies, which are seats on the council specifically set aside for Māori. Like Māori electorates in parliament, their purpose is to ensure that Māori are represented in local government. Whether to have them has been a polarising issue; the Labour, Green, and Māori parties have supported them in order to boost Māori participation in the political process, while National, ACT, and New Zealand First have opposed them on the grounds that they promote ethnic division and alleged separatism.

They were first introduced by the Bay of Plenty Regional Council in 2001. Efforts to introduce them to other councils in New Zealand were complicated by the legal requirement to hold referendums on the issue of introducing them.. As a result, attempts to introduce Māori wards and constituencies were defeated at several polls in New Plymouth, Palmerston North, the Western Bay of Plenty, Whakatāne, Manawatu, and Kaikōura.

In February 2021, the Sixth Labour Government passed the Local Electoral (Māori Wards and Māori Constituencies) Amendment Act 2021, which eliminated the requirement to hold a referendum. This was changed in July 2024, the Sixth National Government passed legislation reinstating the requirement.

As part of this policy reversal, councils that had already established a Māori ward without a referendum were required to either hold a binding poll alongside that year's nation-wide local elections or to disestablish them.

=== Term of office ===
Successful candidates take office the day after the official final results are announced. However, they cannot make any official decisions until they have sworn an oath of office. The swearing-in is held at the first meeting of the council or board, which is usually within two weeks from the announcement of the final results. As chairpersons of regional councils and mayors cannot make official decisions between taking office and being sworn in, they cannot declare a state of local emergency in this period, and it can only be done by the Minister for Emergency Management. Elected members leave office at the end of the day on which the final results of the next election are announced.

== Electoral systems ==
Local authorities in New Zealand can opt to hold local elections using either the first past the post (FPP) system (Note: Technically plurality block voting when applied to elections for multi-member constituencies.) or single transferable vote (STV) system. (Note: Technically preferential voting when applied to elections for a single-member constituency.) FPP had been used for local authority elections up until the 2004 local elections, (Note: Though STV had previously been used for Christchurch City Council elections in 1917, 1929, 1931 & 1933, and Woolston Borough Council elections in 1917 & 1919.) when 10 local authorities adopted the use of STV.

STV was introduced as an option by the Local Electoral Act 2001 following advocacy from Green Party co-leader Rod Donald. When using STV, New Zealand uses a modified Meek method to count the votes. The district health boards used STV for their elections until they were abolished in 2022.

For the most recent local elections in 2025, 15 councils held their votes using STV: Dunedin City Council, Far North District Council, Gisborne District Council, Greater Wellington Regional Council, Hamilton City Council, Kapiti Coast District Council, Marlborough District Council, Nelson City Council, New Plymouth District Council, Otago Regional Council, Palmerston North City Council, Porirua City Council, Ruapehu District Council, Wellington City Council and Whangarei District Council.

== Campaigning and advertisements ==
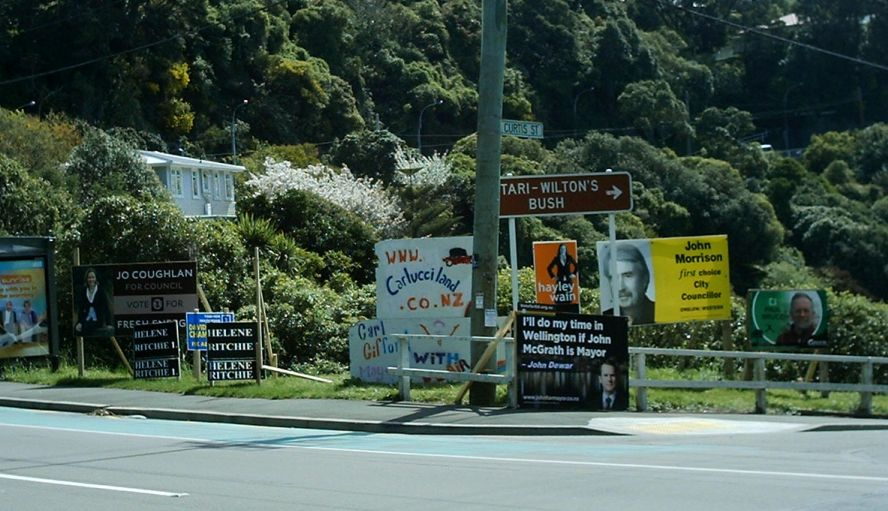
Campaign advertisements for a local election

Rules restricting the use of campaign advertisements are legislated by council by-laws and thus vary wildly across the country. In Wellington, for example, billboards were seen across the city weeks before candidate nominations had even opened for the 2025 elections, as the bylaws allowed signs on private property whenever.

In Auckland and other places, signs could only be displayed up to nine weeks before the final election day. In Dunedin it is two months before election day, in Christchurch it is nine weeks from the start of voting, and in Hamilton it is three months before election day but only on private property.

In all cases, signs must be removed before the final election day.

=== Candidate affiliations ===
When running for a local office, a candidate can indicate on their nomination form if they are running with an affiliation or as an independent. The Local Electoral Act 2001 defines an affiliation as "an endorsement by any organisation or group (whether incorporated or unincorporated)", such as an iwi, hapū or political party, and the electoral officer can require the candidate to provide evidence that they are eligible to claim such affiliation.

The majority of local government candidates run as independents. In the 2019 elections, 60% of winning candidates did not declare any affiliation on their nomination forms, 18% declared themselves as "independent", 4% declared affiliation with a local ticket and only 3% declared affiliation with a registered political party.

Party affiliation for candidates is more common in the main centres of Auckland, Christchurch and Wellington. In 2019, 38% of winning candidates for those councils declared affiliation with a local ticket, 22% declared affiliation with a registered political party, and no candidates left the affiliation section of their nomination forms blank.

National-level political parties Labour, the Greens and Te Pāti Māori each run or endorse candidates for local elections. Local ticket City Vision in Auckland is jointly affiliated with both Labour and the Greens, and People's Choice in Christchurch is also a Labour-affiliate.

In 2025, the ACT Party announced their intention to run or endorse candidates in that year's local elections, which was the first time a national-level right-wing party had run in local elections. Party leader David Seymour stated that ACT did not intend to stand mayoral candidates for the 2025 elections, but may do so for the 2028 elections.

The National Party does not run or officially endorse candidates in local elections. However, they have been associated with local party tickets such as Communities and Residents in Auckland, and Independent Citizens in Christchurch.

While affiliation with a political party has been associated with increased electoral success, at least in Auckland, many councillors who are elected as independent candidates claim there is "no place for party politics" in local government. In response, candidates openly associated with political parties have accused some so-called "independent" candidates of being disingenuous and hiding their political affiliations.

== Voter participation ==
Voter turnout for local elections declined from a national average of 57% in 1989 to a historical low of 38% in 2019.

Reasons given for the low turnout have included "rational choice" theory (whether people think the election matters), "youth footprint" theory (a young voter's experience of their first three elections), "social group" theory (demographic factors) and "first- and second-order elections" theory (where an election is perceived to be within the importance hierarchy of elections). The timing of elections with respect to school holidays was also pointed to as a reason for lower turnout. People cited being "too busy" or "running out of time" as factors in not voting.

Youth turnout has not declined each election, so youth footprint theory is likely not the explanation. The New Zealand literature would seem to support the social group theory; groups with particularly low turnout included young people, non-white people, rural people, and unemployed people, amongst others. The local elections are seen as second-order elections, as the issues at hand are purely local rather than national. This ties into rational choice theory as voters perceive the elections as mattering less.

== Local elections since 1989 ==
In 1989, local government in New Zealand was significantly reformed and re-organised from around 850 local body entities into just 86 local authorities (regional councils and territorial authorities).

=== Territorial authorities ===
==== Regular triennial elections ====
Territorial authority elections (Note: Solid dot (⬤) indicates a Wikipedia article exists; Hollow dot (◯) indicates one does not exist. Star (★) indicates a redirect to another article that covers that election. Bold 'M' (M) indicates an article exists that specifically covers the mayoral election.)
Authority	1989	1992	1995	1998	2001	2004	2007	2010	2013	2016	2019	2022	2025
Far North District Council	◯	◯	◯	◯	★	◯	◯	◯	◯	◯	⬤	★	★
Whangārei District Council	◯	◯	◯	◯	★	◯	◯	◯	◯	◯	◯	★	⬤
Kaipara District Council	◯	◯	◯	◯	★	◯	◯	◯	◯	◯	◯	★	★
Auckland City Council	⬤ M	⬤ M	⬤ M	⬤ M	◯ M	◯ M	◯ M	merged into Auckland Council					
Manukau City Council	◯	◯	◯	◯	◯	◯	◯	merged into Auckland Council					
Waitakere City Council	◯	◯	◯	◯	◯	◯	◯	merged into Auckland Council					
North Shore City Council	◯	◯	◯	◯	◯	◯	◯	merged into Auckland Council					
Papakura District Council	◯	◯	◯	◯	◯	◯	◯	merged into Auckland Council					
Rodney District Council	◯	◯	◯	◯	◯	◯	◯	merged into Auckland Council					
Franklin District Council	◯	◯	◯	◯	◯	◯	◯	merged into Auckland Council					
Auckland Council	did not exist							⬤ M	⬤ M	⬤ M	⬤ M	⬤ M	⬤ M
Auckland local boards	did not exist							◯	⬤	⬤	◯	⬤	⬤
Thames-Coromandel District Council	◯	◯	◯	◯	◯	◯	◯	◯	◯	◯	◯	◯	★
Hauraki District Council	◯	◯	◯	◯	◯	◯	◯	◯	◯	◯	◯	◯	⬤
Waikato District Council	◯	◯	◯	◯	◯	◯	◯	◯	◯	◯	◯	◯	★
Matamata-Piako District Council	◯	◯	◯	◯	◯	◯	◯	◯	◯	◯	◯	◯	★
Hamilton City Council	◯	◯	◯	◯	◯	◯	◯	◯	⬤ M	◯ M	◯ M	◯ M	⬤ M
Waipā District Council	◯	◯	◯	◯	◯	◯	◯	◯	◯	◯	◯	◯	★
Ōtorohanga District Council	◯	◯	◯	◯	◯	◯	◯	◯	◯	◯	◯	◯	★
South Waikato District Council	◯	◯	◯	◯	◯	◯	◯	◯	◯	◯	◯	◯	★
Waitomo District Council	◯	◯	◯	◯	◯	◯	◯	◯	◯	◯	◯	◯	★
Taupō District Council	◯	◯	◯	◯	◯	◯	◯	◯	◯	◯	◯	◯	★
Western Bay of Plenty District Council	◯	◯	◯	◯	◯	◯	◯	◯	◯	◯	◯	◯	★
Tauranga City Council	◯	◯	◯	◯	◯	◯	◯	◯	◯	◯	◯	(Note: No election was held for the Tauranga City Council in 2022 due to the council being under a Crown commission. Elections were held in 2024 so no election occurred in 2025 because of this.)	
Rotorua Lakes Council	◯	◯	◯	◯	◯	◯	◯	◯	◯	◯	◯	◯	⬤
Whakatāne District Council	◯	◯	◯	◯	◯	◯	◯	◯	◯	◯	◯	◯	★
Kawerau District Council	◯	◯	◯	◯	◯	◯	◯	◯	◯	◯	◯	◯	★
Ōpōtiki District Council	◯	◯	◯	◯	◯	◯	◯	◯	◯	◯	◯	◯	★
Gisborne District Council	◯	◯	◯	◯	◯	◯	◯	◯	◯	◯	◯	⬤	⬤
Wairoa District Council	★	◯	◯	◯	★	◯	◯	◯	◯	◯	◯	◯	★
Hastings District Council	★	◯	◯	◯	★	◯	◯	◯	◯	◯	◯	⬤	⬤
Napier City Council	★	◯	◯	◯	★	◯	◯	◯	◯	◯	◯	◯	⬤
Central Hawke's Bay District Council	★	◯	◯	◯	★	◯	◯	◯	◯	◯	◯	◯	★
New Plymouth District Council	◯	◯	◯	◯	◯	◯	◯	◯	◯	◯	◯	◯	⬤
Stratford District Council	◯	◯	◯	◯	◯	◯	◯	◯	◯	◯	◯	◯	★
South Taranaki District Council	◯	◯	◯	◯	◯	◯	◯	◯	◯	◯	◯	◯	★
Ruapehu District Council	◯	◯	◯	◯	◯	◯	◯	◯	◯	◯	◯	◯	★
Whanganui District Council	◯	◯	◯	◯	◯	◯	◯	◯	◯	◯	◯	◯	⬤
Rangitikei District Council	◯	◯	◯	◯	◯	◯	◯	⬤	⬤	⬤	◯	◯	★
Manawatū District Council	◯	◯	◯	◯	◯	◯	◯	◯	◯	◯	◯	◯	★
Palmerston North City Council	◯	◯	◯	◯	◯	◯	◯	◯	◯	◯	◯	◯	⬤
Tararua District Council	◯	◯	◯	◯	◯	◯	◯	◯	◯	◯	◯	◯	★
Horowhenua District Council	◯	◯	◯	◯	◯	◯	◯	◯	◯	◯	◯	◯	★
Kāpiti Coast District Council	◯	◯	◯	◯	◯	◯	◯	◯	◯	◯	◯	⬤	⬤
Porirua City Council	⬤ M	⬤ M	⬤ M	⬤ M	⬤ M	◯ M	◯	◯	◯	◯	◯	⬤	⬤ M
Upper Hutt City Council	◯	◯	◯	◯	◯	◯	◯	◯	◯	◯	◯	⬤	⬤
Hutt City Council	⬤ M	⬤ M	⬤ M	⬤ M	⬤ M	⬤ M	◯ M	◯ M	◯ M	◯ M	◯ M	⬤ M	⬤ M
Wellington City Council	⬤ M	⬤ M	⬤ M	⬤ M	⬤ M	⬤ M	⬤ M	◯ M	⬤ M	⬤ M	⬤ M	⬤ M	⬤ M
Masterton District Council	◯	◯	◯	◯	◯	◯	◯	◯	◯	◯	◯	⬤	★
Carterton District Council	◯	◯	◯	◯	◯	◯	◯	◯	◯	◯	◯	⬤	★
South Wairarapa District Council	◯	◯	◯	◯	◯	◯	◯	◯	◯	◯	◯	◯	★
Tasman District Council	⬤	◯	◯	◯	◯	◯	◯	◯	◯	◯	⬤	⬤	⬤
Nelson City Council	◯	◯	◯	◯	◯	◯	◯	◯	◯	◯	◯	⬤	⬤
Marlborough District Council	◯	◯	◯	◯	◯	◯	◯	◯	◯	◯	◯	⬤	★
Buller District Council	◯	◯	◯	◯	◯	◯	◯	◯	◯	◯	◯	◯	★
Grey District Council	◯	◯	◯	◯	◯	◯	◯	◯	◯	◯	◯	◯	★
Westland District Council	◯	◯	◯	◯	◯	◯	◯	◯	◯	◯	◯	◯	★
Kaikōura District Council	◯	◯	◯	◯	◯	◯	◯	◯	◯	◯	◯	◯	★
Hurunui District Council	◯	◯	◯	◯	◯	◯	◯	◯	◯	◯	◯	◯	★
Waimakariri District Council	◯	◯	◯	◯	◯	◯	◯	◯	◯	◯	◯	◯	★
Christchurch City Council	◯ M	◯ M	◯ M	◯ M	◯ M	◯ M	◯ M	◯ M	◯ M	◯ M	◯ M	⬤ M	⬤ M
Banks Peninsula District Council	◯	◯	◯	◯	◯	◯	merged with Christchurch City Council						
Selwyn District Council	◯	◯	◯	◯	◯	◯	◯	◯	◯	◯	◯	◯	★
Ashburton District Council	◯	◯	◯	◯	◯	◯	◯	◯	◯	◯	◯	◯	★
Timaru District Council	◯	◯	◯	◯	◯	◯	◯	◯	◯	◯	◯	◯	★
Mackenzie District Council	◯	◯	◯	◯	◯	◯	◯	◯	◯	◯	◯	◯	★
Waimate District Council	◯	◯	◯	◯	◯	◯	◯	◯	◯	◯	◯	◯	★
Waitaki District Council	◯	◯	◯	◯	◯	◯	◯	◯	◯	◯	◯	◯	★
Central Otago District Council	◯	◯	◯	◯	◯	◯	◯	◯	◯	◯	◯	◯	★
Queenstown-Lakes District Council	◯	◯	◯	◯	◯	◯	◯	◯	◯	◯	◯	⬤	⬤
Dunedin City Council	◯ M	◯ M	◯ M	◯ M	◯ M	◯ M	◯ M	⬤ M	◯ M	◯ M	◯ M	⬤ M	⬤ M
Clutha District Council	◯	◯	◯	◯	◯	◯	◯	◯	◯	◯	◯	◯	★
Southland District Council	◯	◯	◯	◯	◯	◯	◯	◯	◯	◯	◯	◯	★
Gore District Council	◯	◯	◯	◯	◯	◯	◯	◯	◯	◯	◯	◯	★
Invercargill City Council	◯ M	◯ M	◯ M	◯ M	◯	◯ M	◯ M	◯ M	◯ M	◯ M	◯ M	◯ M	⬤
Chatham Islands Council	◯	◯	◯	◯	◯	◯	◯	◯	◯	◯	◯	◯	★

==== By-elections and other off-cycle elections ====
Territorial authority elections
Authority	1991	1993	1994	1995	1996	1997	2000	2006	2008	2011	2012	2017	2018	2021	2022	2023	2024	2026
Auckland Council	N/A									★			★					
Auckland local boards	N/A														★	★		★
Auckland City Council	★		★				★		★	N/A								
Tauranga City Council																	⬤ M	
Hastings District Council												⬤					◯	
Hutt City Council		★		★										★				
Porirua City Council																		★
Wellington City Council	★		★		★	★	★					★					★	
Masterton District Council																		◯
South Wairarapa District Council																		◯
Central Otago District Council																		★
Dunedin City Council																		⬤
Invercargill City Council		M						★			★			★		★		
Chatham Islands Council																		★

=== Regional councils ===
==== Regular triennial elections ====
Regional council elections
Regional council	1989	1992	1995	1998	2001	2004	2007	2010	2013	2016	2019	2022	2025
Northland Regional Council	◯	◯	◯	◯	★	◯	◯	◯	◯	◯	◯	★	★
Auckland Regional Council	◯	◯	◯	◯	★	◯	◯	merged into Auckland Council					
Waikato Regional Council	◯	◯	◯	◯	★	◯	◯	◯	◯	◯	◯	★	★
Bay of Plenty Regional Council	◯	◯	◯	◯	★	◯	◯	◯	◯	◯	◯	★	★
Hawke's Bay Regional Council	◯	◯	◯	◯	★	◯	◯	◯	◯	◯	⬤	★	⬤
Taranaki Regional Council	◯	◯	◯	◯	★	◯	◯	◯	◯	◯	◯	★	★
Horizons Regional Council	◯	◯	◯	◯	★	◯	◯	◯	◯	◯	◯	★	★
Greater Wellington Regional Council	◯	◯	◯	◯	★	◯	◯	⬤	◯	⬤	⬤	⬤	⬤
Nelson-Marlborough Regional Council	⬤	disestablished (Note: Functions went to Nelson, Tasman & Marlborough District Councils.)											
West Coast Regional Council	◯	◯	◯	◯	★	◯	◯	◯	◯	◯	◯	★	★
Environment Canterbury	◯	◯	◯	◯	★	◯	◯	com.		◯	◯	★	⬤
Otago Regional Council	◯	◯	◯	◯	★	◯	◯	◯	◯	◯	◯	★	⬤
Environment Southland	◯	◯	◯	◯	★	◯	◯	◯	◯	◯	◯	★	⬤

==== By-elections and other off-cycle elections ====
Regional council elections
Authority	2026
Bay of Plenty Regional Council	◯
Greater Wellington Regional Council	⬤

== Local elections before 1989 ==
=== Mayoral elections ===
Municipal mayoral elections (19th century) (Note: This list is non-exhaustive; mayoral elections for other places took place during the period.)
Mayor	1842	1865	1866	1867	1868	1869	1870	1871	1872	1873	1874	1875	1876	1877	1878	1879	1880	1881	1882	1883	1884	1885	1886	1887	1888	1889	1890	1891	1892	1893	1894	1895	1896	1897	1898	1899	By-elections
Auckland								◯	◯	◯	◯	◯	◯	◯	◯	◯	◯	◯	◯	◯	◯	◯	◯	◯	◯	◯	◯	◯	◯	◯	◯	◯	◯	◯	◯	◯	
Hamilton															◯	◯	◯	◯	◯	◯	◯	◯	◯	◯	◯	◯	◯	◯	◯	◯	◯	◯	◯	◯	◯	◯	
Napier												◯	◯	◯	◯	◯	◯	◯	◯	◯	◯	◯	◯	◯	◯	◯	◯	◯	◯	◯	◯	◯	◯	◯	◯	◯	
Hastings																							★	★	★	★	★	★	★	★	★	?	★	?	★	★	
Lower Hutt																												◯	◯	◯	◯	◯	◯	◯	◯	◯	
Wellington	⬤										⬤	⬤	⬤	⬤	⬤	⬤	⬤	⬤	⬤	⬤	⬤	⬤	⬤	⬤	⬤	⬤	⬤	⬤	⬤	⬤	⬤	⬤	⬤	⬤	⬤	⬤	1879
Christchurch													⬤	◯	⬤	◯	◯	⬤	◯	◯	◯	◯	◯	◯	◯	◯	◯	◯	◯	◯	◯	⬤	◯	◯	◯	◯	
Dunedin		⬤	◯	◯	◯	◯	◯	◯	◯	◯	◯	◯	◯	◯	◯	◯	◯	◯	◯	◯	◯	◯	◯	◯	◯	◯	◯	◯	◯	◯	◯	◯	◯	◯	◯	◯	
Invercargill								⬤	◯	◯	⬤	◯	⬤	⬤	⬤	⬤	⬤	◯	⬤	⬤	⬤	⬤	⬤	⬤	◯	⬤	⬤	◯	⬤	⬤	⬤	⬤	⬤	◯	⬤	⬤	1887

Municipal mayoral elections (1901–1950)
Mayor	1901 (Note: Following the passage of the Municipal Corporations Act 1900, elections for mayor continued to take place annually while elections of councillors moved to take place every two years.)	1902	1903	1904	1905	1906	1907	1908	1909	1910	1911	1912	1913	1914	1915 (Note: Starting from 1915, mayoral elections began taking place biennially.)	1917	1919	1921	1923	1925	1927	1929	1931	1933	1935 (Note: Starting from 1935, mayoral elections began taking place triennially.)	1938	1941	1944	1947	1950	By-elections
Auckland	⬤	◯	◯	◯	⬤	⬤	⬤	⬤	⬤	⬤	⬤	⬤	⬤	⬤	⬤	⬤	⬤	⬤	⬤	⬤	⬤	⬤	⬤	⬤	⬤	⬤	⬤	⬤	⬤	⬤	
Hamilton	◯	◯	◯	◯	◯	◯	◯	◯	◯	◯	◯	◯	◯	◯	◯	◯	◯	◯	◯	◯	◯	◯	◯	◯	◯	◯	◯	◯	◯	◯	
Napier	◯	◯	◯	◯	◯	◯	◯	◯	◯	◯	◯	◯	◯	◯	◯	⬤	◯	◯	◯	◯	◯	◯	(Note: In 1931, a devastating earthquake hit Hawke's Bay. Elections in the region were not held that year because of this.)	◯	◯	◯	◯	◯	◯	◯	
Hastings	★	★	★	★	★	★	★	★	★	★	★	★	★	★	★	★	★	★	★	★	★	★		★	★	★	★	★	★	★	
Lower Hutt	◯	◯	◯	◯	◯	◯	◯	◯	◯	◯	◯	◯	◯	◯	◯	◯	◯	◯	⬤	⬤	⬤	⬤	⬤	⬤	⬤	⬤	⬤	⬤	⬤	⬤	1921; 1949
Wellington	⬤	⬤	⬤	⬤	⬤	⬤	⬤	⬤	⬤	⬤	⬤	⬤	⬤	⬤	⬤	⬤	⬤	⬤	⬤	⬤	⬤	⬤	⬤	⬤	⬤	⬤	⬤	⬤	⬤	⬤	
Christchurch	◯	◯	◯	◯	◯	◯	◯	◯	◯	◯	◯	◯	◯	◯	◯	◯	◯	◯	◯	◯	◯	◯	◯	⬤	⬤	⬤	⬤	⬤	⬤	⬤	1936
Dunedin	◯	◯	◯	◯	◯	◯	◯	◯	◯	◯	◯	◯	◯	◯	◯	◯	◯	◯	◯	◯	◯	⬤	⬤	⬤	⬤	⬤	⬤	⬤	⬤	⬤	
Invercargill	⬤	◯	⬤	◯	⬤	◯	⬤	⬤	⬤	◯	◯	⬤	⬤	⬤	⬤	⬤	⬤	⬤	⬤	◯	⬤	⬤	⬤	⬤	◯	⬤	◯	⬤	⬤	◯	1938; 1942

Municipal mayoral elections (1951–1988)
Mayor	1953	1956	1959	1962	1965	1968	1971	1974	1977	1980	1983	1986	By-elections
Auckland	⬤	⬤	⬤	⬤	⬤	⬤	⬤	⬤	⬤	⬤	⬤	⬤	1957
Hamilton	◯	◯	◯	◯	◯	◯	◯	◯	◯	◯	◯	◯	1976
Napier	◯	◯	◯	◯	◯	◯	◯	◯	◯	◯	◯	◯	
Hastings	★	★	★	★	★	★	★	★	★	★	★	★	
Porirua				⬤	⬤	⬤	⬤	⬤	⬤	⬤	⬤	⬤	
Lower Hutt	⬤	⬤	⬤	⬤	⬤	⬤	⬤	⬤	⬤	⬤	⬤	⬤	
Wellington	⬤	⬤	⬤	⬤	⬤	⬤	⬤	⬤	⬤	⬤	⬤	⬤	
Christchurch	⬤	⬤	⬤	⬤	⬤	⬤	⬤	⬤	⬤	⬤	⬤	⬤	1958
Dunedin	⬤	⬤	⬤	⬤	⬤	⬤	⬤	⬤	⬤	⬤	⬤	⬤	
Invercargill	⬤	◯	◯	⬤	⬤	⬤	⬤	⬤	◯	⬤	⬤	⬤	

=== Council elections ===
==== Auckland ====
1901 • 1986

==== Hastings ====
1901

==== Napier ====
1901

==== Wellington ====
1901 • 1986

==== Porirua ====
1983 • 1986

==== Nelson ====
1901

==== Christchurch ====
1901 • 1983 • 1986

==== Dunedin ====
1901

==== Invercargill ====
1901

== Provincial elections ==
The provinces of New Zealand had responsible government from 1853 until 1876 when they were abolished. Under the New Zealand Constitution Act 1852, elections were held for the councils and superintendents of the provinces every four years.

The New Provinces Act 1858 allowed for the creation of new provinces other than the original six. These provinces would not directly elect their superintendents.

Map of provinces (1852)

Provincial elections
Province	1853	1857	–	1861	1865	1869	1873	–
Auckland Province	★	◯		◯	◯	◯	◯	
New Plymouth Province (1853–1859); Taranaki Province (1859–1876)	★	◯		◯	◯	◯	◯	
Hawke's Bay Province			◯ (Note: Hawke's Bay Province was created in 1858; its first election was in 1859.)	◯	◯	◯	◯	
Wellington Province	★	◯		◯	◯	◯	◯	
Nelson Province	★	◯		◯	◯	◯	◯	
Marlborough Province			◯ (Note: Marlborough Province was created in 1859; its first election was in 1860.)	◯	◯	◯	◯	
Westland Province								◯ (Note: Westland Province was created in 1873 and had its first and only election in 1874.)
Canterbury Province	★	◯		◯	◯	◯	◯	
Otago Province	★	◯		◯	◯	◯	◯	
Southland Province				◯	◯	◯	(Note: Merged back into Otago in 1870.)	

== See also ==
- Politics of New Zealand
- Local government in New Zealand

== Sources ==
- Asquith, Andy; Webster, Karen; Cardow, Andrew (28 June 2021). "Voting in New Zealand local government elections: the need to encourage greater voter turnout". Commonwealth Journal of Local Governance (24): 79–97. doi:10.5130/cjlg.vi24.7541. hdl:10292/14725.
