= 1883 Invercargill mayoral election =

1883 mayoral election in Invercargill, New Zealand

← 1882	29 November 1883	1884 →
- Turnout: 617
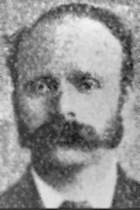

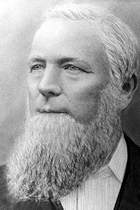

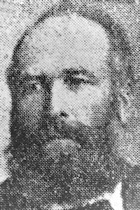
Candidate	William Sherriffs Moir	George Froggatt	John Lyon McDonald
Party	Independent	Independent	Independent
Popular vote	266	194	157
Percentage	43.11	31.44	25.44
Mayor before election
John Kingsland
Elected mayor
William Sherriffs Moir

The 1883 Invercargill mayoral election was held on 29 November 1883.

William Sherriffs Moir was elected mayor. His opponents would go on to be the next two mayors.

== Results ==
The following table gives the election results:

1883 Invercargill mayoral election
Party	Candidate	Votes	%	±%
Independent	William Sherriffs Moir	266	43.11	
Independent	George Froggatt	194	31.44	
Independent	John Lyon McDonald	157	25.44	−20.66
Majority		72	11.67	
Turnout		617		
