= 1889 Wellington mayoral election =

New Zealand local election

- 27 November 1889
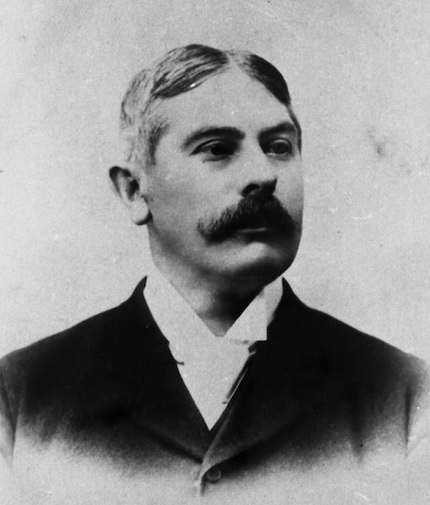
| Candidate | Charles Johnston |
| Party | Independent |
| Popular vote | elected unopposed |
Mayor before election
John Duthie
Elected mayor
Charles Johnston

The 1889 Wellington mayoral election was part of the New Zealand local elections held that same year to decide who would take the office of Mayor of Wellington for the following year.

== Background ==
After a popular term in office the incumbent mayor, John Duthie, surprisingly declined to seek re-election. There was speculation that former city councillor Kennedy Macdonald (who retired in Duthie's favour at the previous election) would stand to succeed him as mayor, though he did not. After a period of uncertainty over whether any candidates would come forward at all, Charles Johnston, the former member of parliament for Te Aro, was nominated. Ultimately he was the only candidate nominated and thus was declared elected unopposed. It was the second mayoral election in a row where the mayoralty was uncontested.
