= 1881 Wellington mayoral election =

New Zealand local election

- 30 November 1881
- Turnout: 1,219
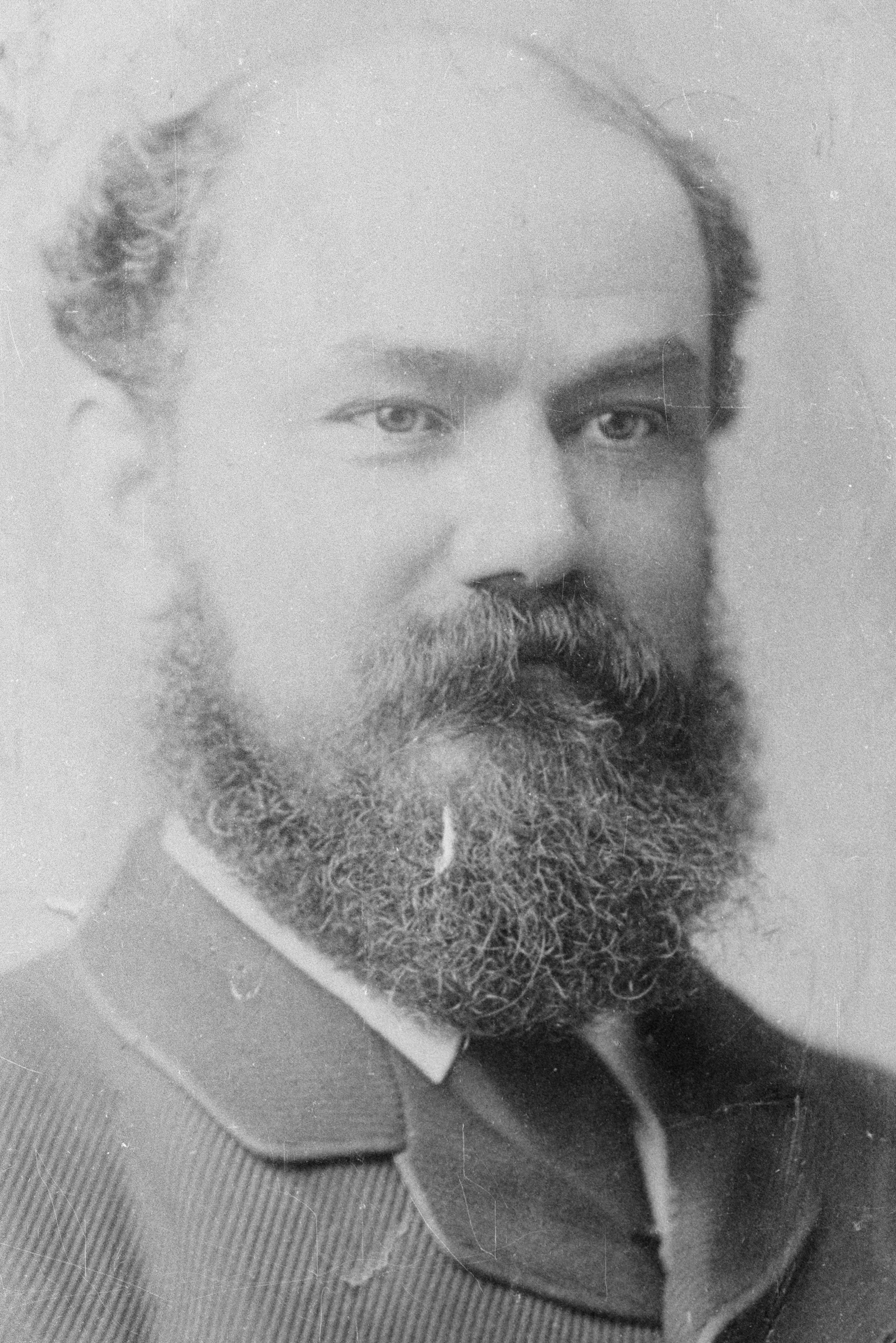

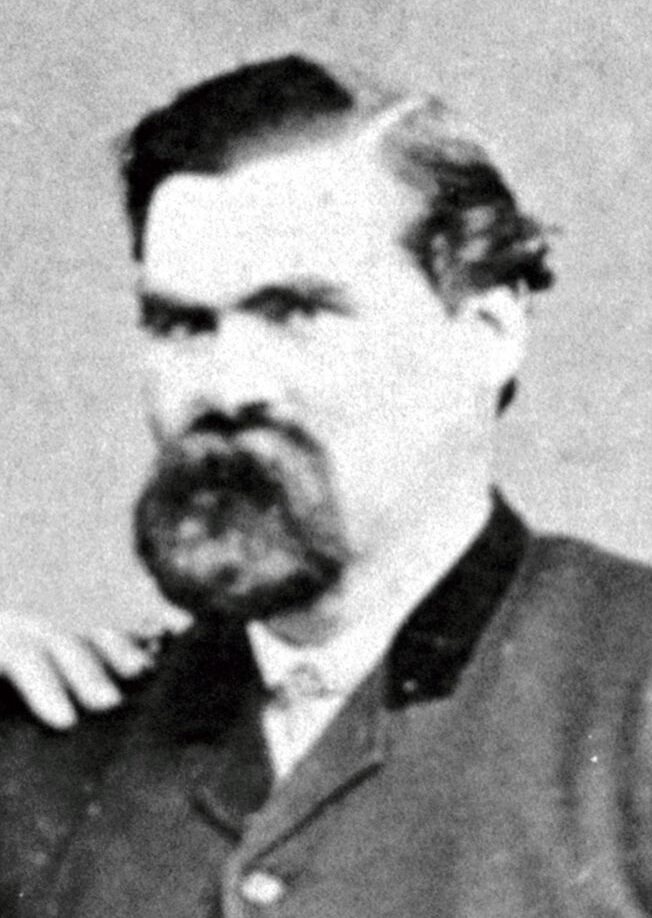

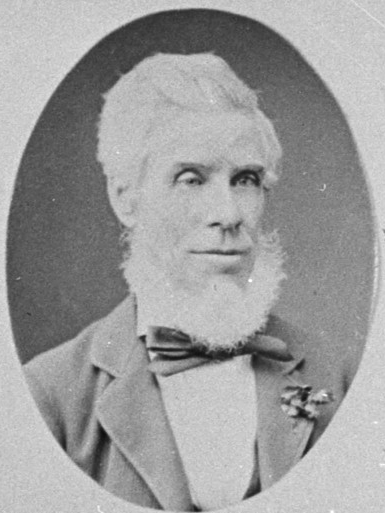
Candidate	George Fisher	Andrew Young	William Hutchison
Party	Independent	Independent	Independent
Popular vote	446	391	382
Percentage	36.58	32.07	31.33
Mayor before election
William Hutchison
Elected mayor
George Fisher

The 1881 Wellington mayoral election was part of the New Zealand local elections held that same year to decide who would take the office of Mayor of Wellington.

== Background ==
Incumbent mayor William Hutchison sought re-election for another term but lost the election in a three-way race to George Fisher.

== Election results ==
The following table gives the election results:

1881 Wellington mayoral election
Party	Candidate	Votes	%	±%
Independent	George Fisher	446	36.58	
Independent	Andrew Young	391	32.07	−2.15
Independent	William Hutchison	382	31.33	−9.08
Majority		55	4.51	
Turnout		1,219		
