= 1908 Wellington mayoral election =

New Zealand local election

- 29 April 1908
- Turnout: 14,812 (51.64%)
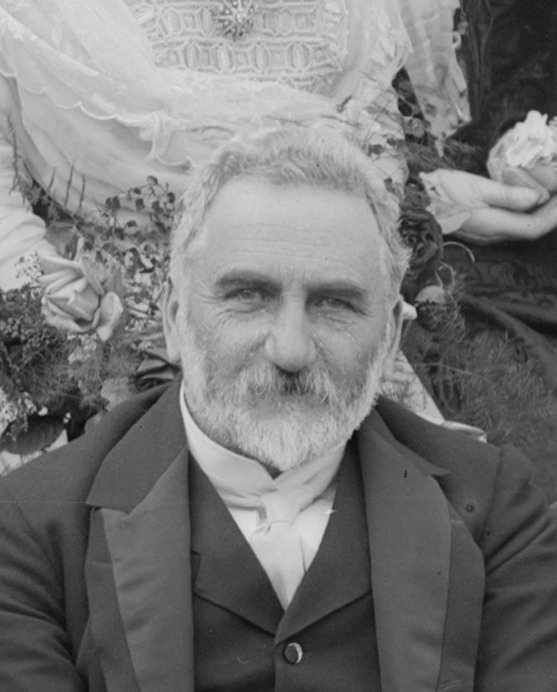

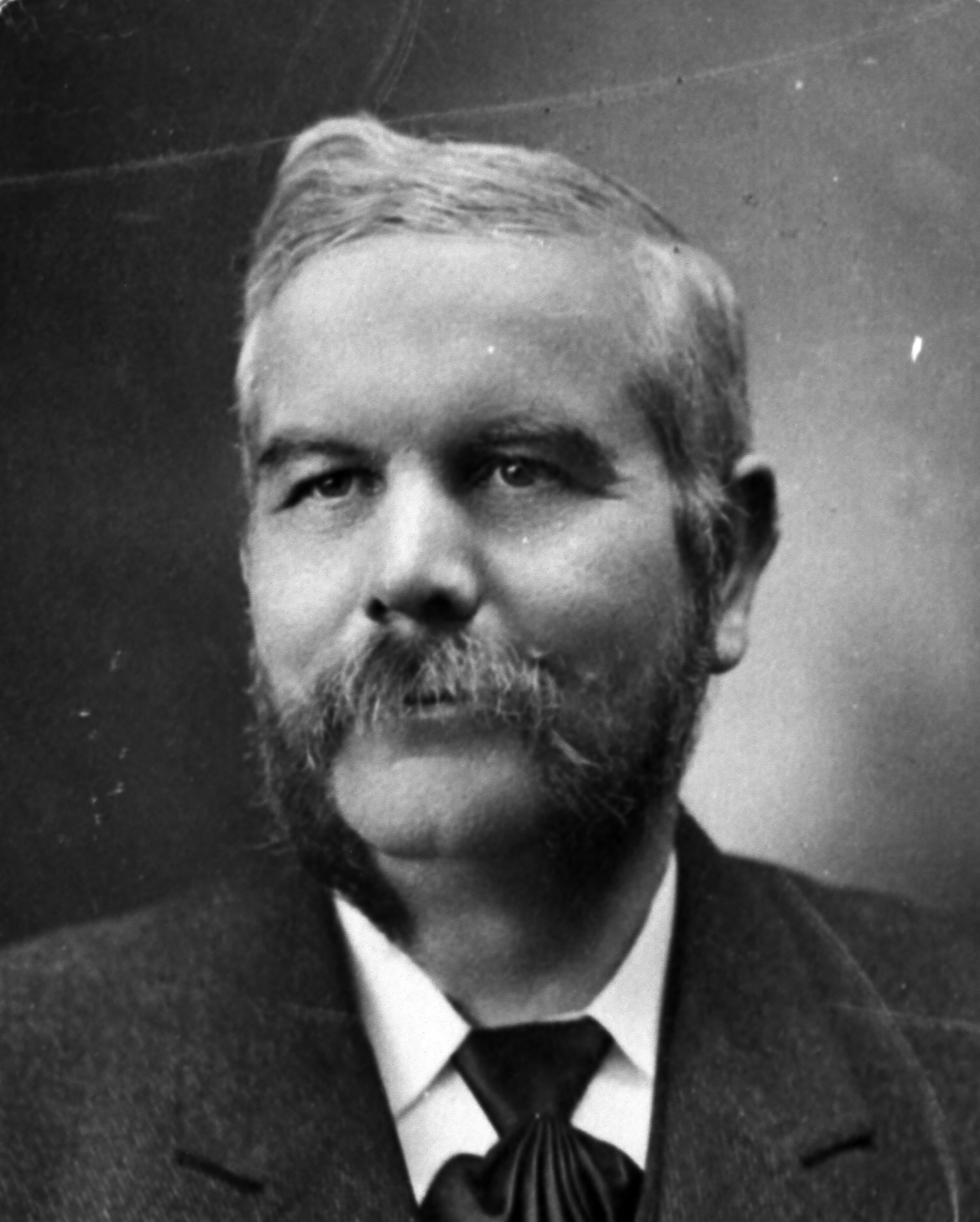
Candidate	Thomas William Hislop	John Aitken
Party	Independent	Independent
Popular vote	9,192	5,549
Percentage	62.04	37.46
Mayor before election
Thomas William Hislop
Elected mayor
Thomas William Hislop

The 1908 Wellington mayoral election was part of the New Zealand local elections held that same year. The polling was conducted using the standard first-past-the-post electoral method.

== Background ==
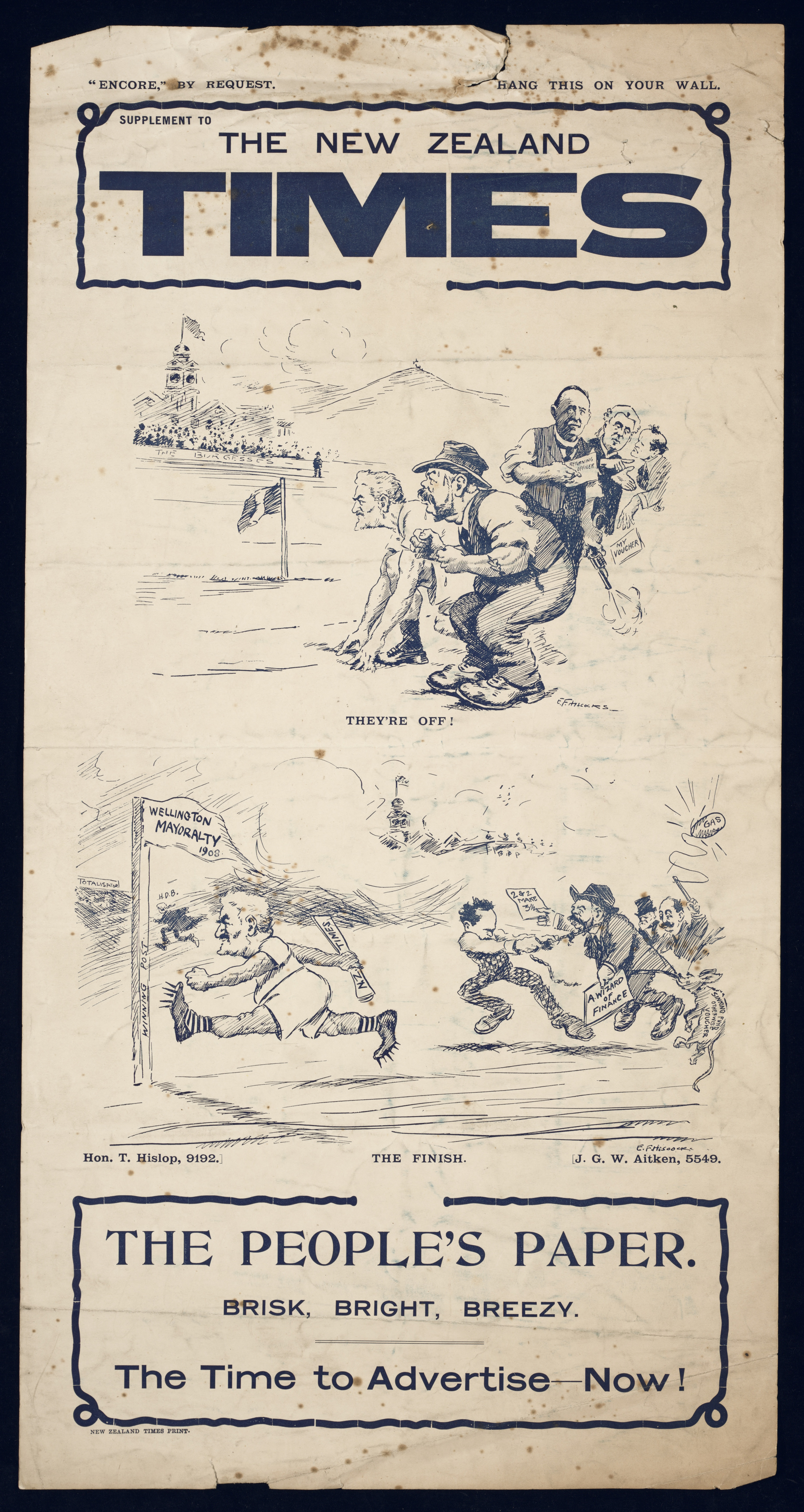
Cartoon of the mayoral race

In 1908 former Mayor John Aitken launched a fresh campaign to regain the position but was defeated by the incumbent Mayor Thomas William Hislop.

== Mayoralty results ==
The following table gives the election results:

1908 Wellington mayoral election
Party	Candidate	Votes	%	±%
Independent	Thomas William Hislop	9,192	62.05	−3.58
Independent	John Aitken	5,549	37.46	
Majority		3,634	24.53	−6.74
Turnout		14,812	51.64	+7.92
