= 1927 Lower Hutt mayoral election =

- 27 April 1927
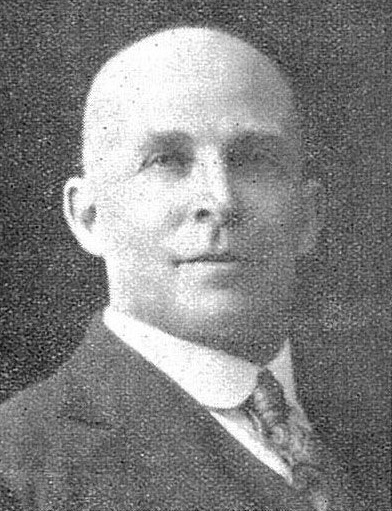
Candidate	Will Strand
Party	Independent
Popular vote	Unopposed
Mayor before election
Will Strand
Elected mayor
Will Strand

The 1927 Lower Hutt mayoral election was part of the New Zealand local elections held that same year. The elections were held for the role of Mayor of Lower Hutt plus other local government positions including the nine borough councillors, also elected biennially. The polling was conducted using the standard first-past-the-post electoral method.

== Background ==
The incumbent mayor, Will Strand, was not going to stand for re-election due to personal matters. However, by mid-February his circumstances had changed to the point where he accepted nomination to stand again. No other candidates emerged and he was thusly declared elected unopposed. The election took place during a time of rapid population increase due to a state housing scheme in the borough. By May 1927 over 600 sections had been bought up for prefabricated housing.

== Councillor results ==
1927 Lower Hutt Borough Council election
Party	Candidate	Votes	%	±%
Citizens'	Sir Alex Roberts	1,154	89.31	
Independent	Archibald Hobbs	1,134	87.77	+9.52
Citizens'	Alexander McBain	1,114	86.22	+3.19
Independent	Archibald Grierson	1,054	81.57	+0.68
Citizens'	Ernest Hunt	1,024	79.25	+0.27
Independent	Walter Meldrum	920	71.20	+1.48
Citizens'	John Mitchell	873	67.56	−4.51
Citizens'	Frank Campbell	863	66.79	
Citizens'	Edward Waldie	862	66.71	+0.22
Independent	Arthur Carver	745	57.66	
Independent	Hugh McGill	595	46.05	
Independent	Charles Strong	496	38.39	
Independent	William Henry Edwards	468	36.22	
Independent	Walter Cotton	325	25.15	
