= 1895 Wellington mayoral election =

New Zealand local election

- 27 November 1895
- Turnout: 2,176
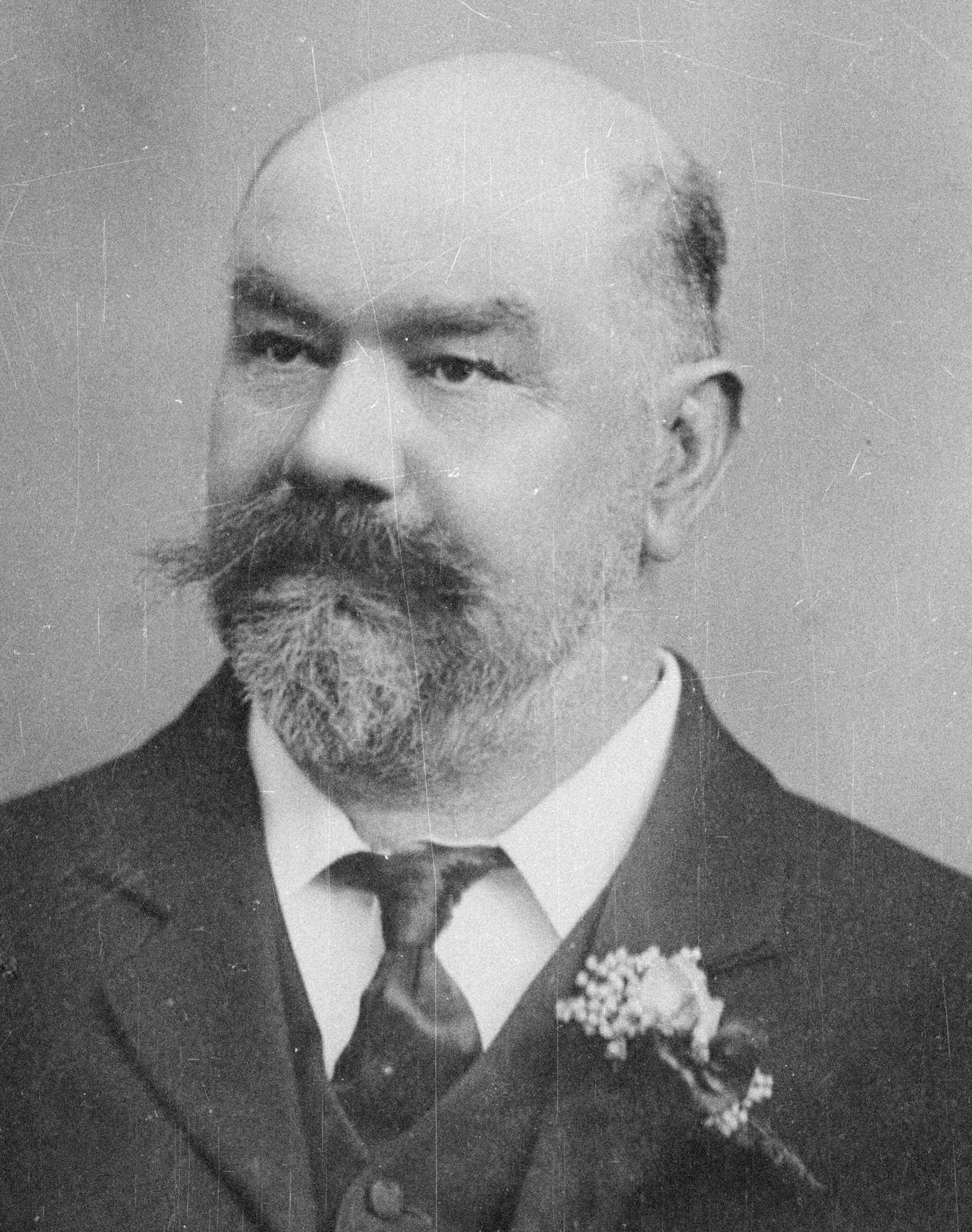

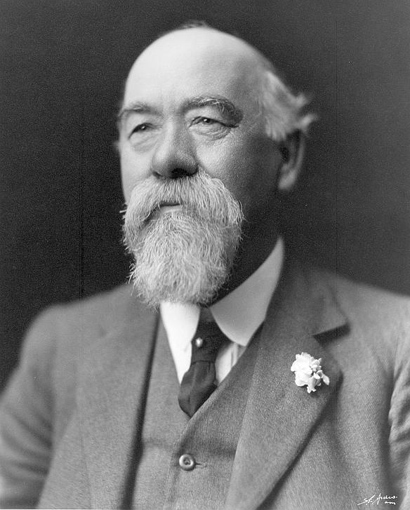
Candidate	George Fisher	Charles Luke
Party	Independent	Independent
Popular vote	1,250	926
Percentage	57.44	42.56
Mayor before election
Charles Luke
Elected mayor
George Fisher

The 1895 Wellington mayoral election was part of the New Zealand local elections held that same year. The polling was conducted using the standard first-past-the-post electoral method.

== Background ==
In 1895 incumbent Mayor Charles Luke was defeated by MP and former Mayor George Fisher.

== Results ==
The following table gives the election results:

1895 Wellington mayoral election
Party	Candidate	Votes	%	±%
Independent	George Fisher	1,250	57.44	
Independent	Charles Luke	926	42.56	−4.71
Majority		324	14.88	
Turnout		2,176		
