= 1876 Wellington mayoral election =

New Zealand local election

- 11 December 1876
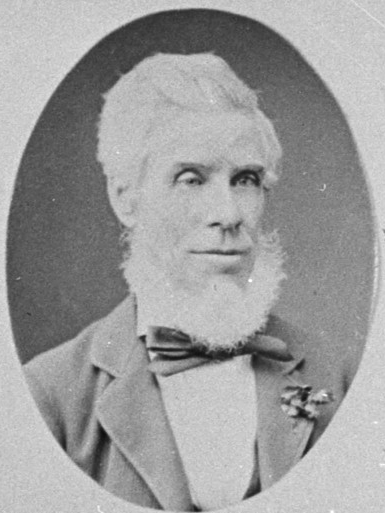
| Candidate | William Hutchison |
| Party | Independent |
| Popular vote | elected unopposed |
Mayor before election
William Hutchison
Elected mayor
William Hutchison

The 1876 Wellington mayoral election was part of the New Zealand local elections held that same year. William Hutchison, the incumbent Mayor sought re-election and retained office unopposed with no other candidates emerging.

== Background ==
In his term as Mayor of Wellington, Hutchinson was mostly occupied with the issue of whether the Wellington Waterfront should be controlled by the city council directly or by a separate entity. It would later result in the creation of the Wellington Harbour Board. It was the first of four instances between 1876 and 1898 where the mayoralty was uncontested. This was the first election where women were allowed to vote and stand as candidates for office (though none stood).
