= 1983 Christchurch mayoral election =

New Zealand mayoral election

- 8 October 1983
- Turnout: 41,827
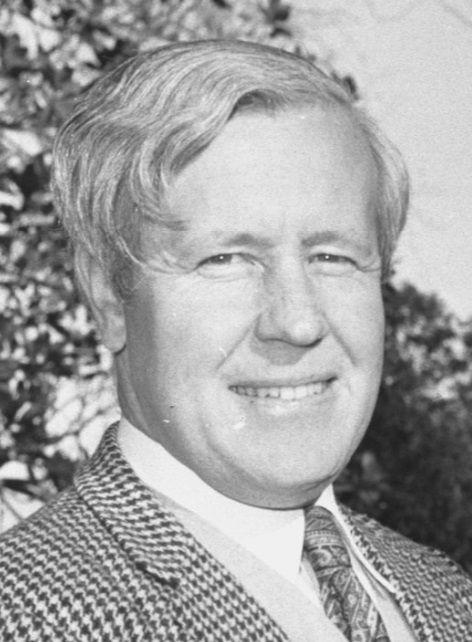

Candidate	Hamish Hay	Rex Lester
Party	Citizens'	Labour
Popular vote	27,263	14,065
Percentage	65.18	33.62
Mayor before election
Hamish Hay
Elected mayor
Hamish Hay

The 1983 Christchurch mayoral election was part of the New Zealand local elections held that same year. In 1983, election were held for the Mayor of Christchurch plus other local government positions. The polling was conducted using the standard first-past-the-post electoral method.

== Background ==
Incumbent Mayor Hamish Hay became the Christchurch Citizens' Association's candidate in March 1983. Rex Lester, the deputy mayor, was chosen as the Labour Party's candidate later that same month.

== Results ==
Hay was re-elected with an increased majority, defeating Lester. In addition to Hay retaining the mayoralty there was a concurrent swing towards the Citizens' Association leaving the composition of the council at eleven seats to the Citizens' Association with eight to the Labour Party.

Earlier in the day, Lester's home was broken into by burglars who stole his bicycle and sporting gear.

The following table gives the election results:

1983 Christchurch mayoral election
Party	Candidate	Votes	%	±%
Citizens'	Hamish Hay	27,263	65.18	+11.88
Labour	Rex Lester	14,065	33.62	
Economic Euthenics	Tubby Hansen	274	0.65	−0.68
Informal votes		225	0.53	+0.14
Majority		13,198	31.55	+23.22
Turnout		41,827		

== Ward results ==
Candidates were also elected from wards to the Christchurch City Council.

Party/ticket	Councillors
Citizens'	11
Labour	8
