= 1896 Wellington mayoral election =

New Zealand local election

- 26 November 1899
- Turnout: 2,091
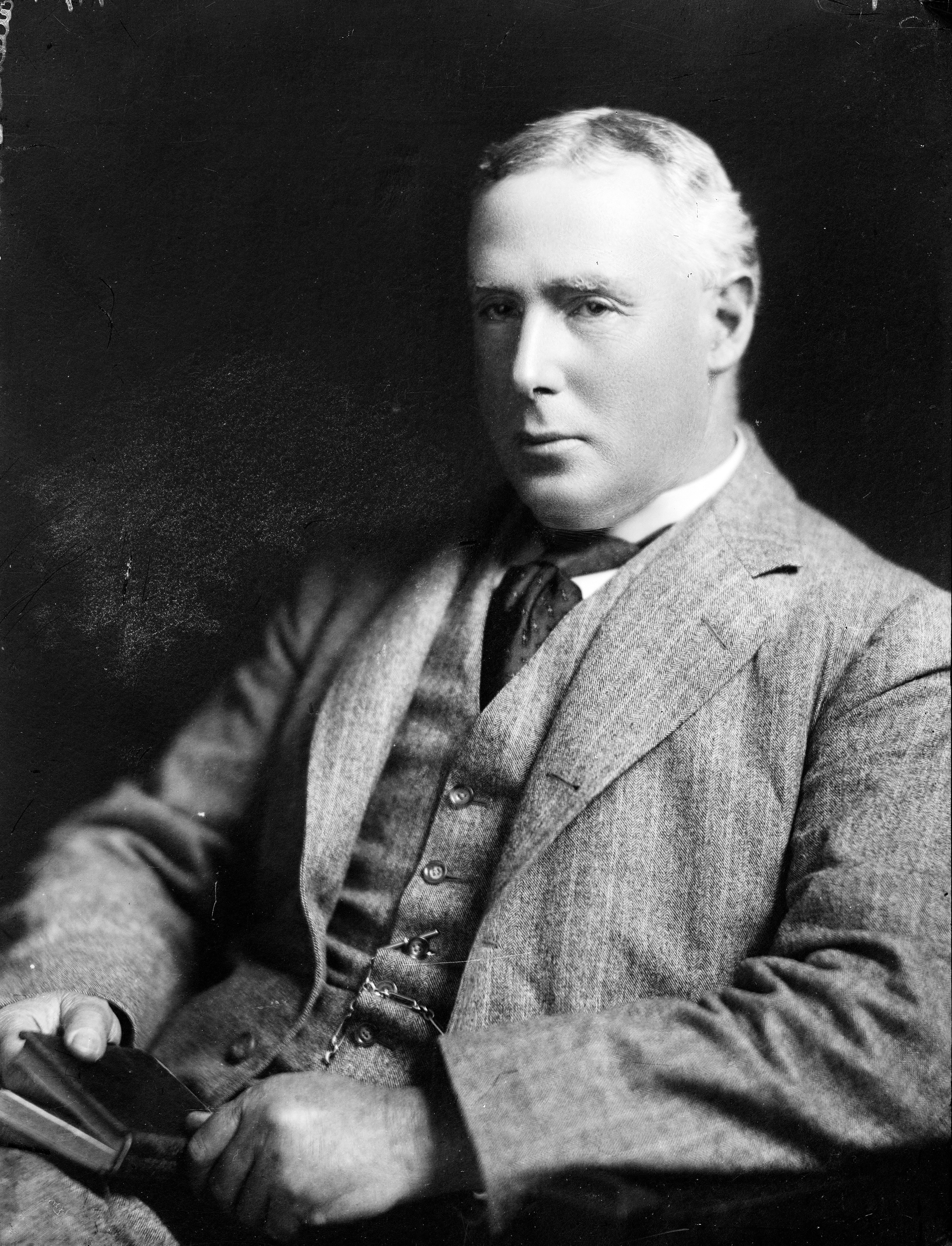

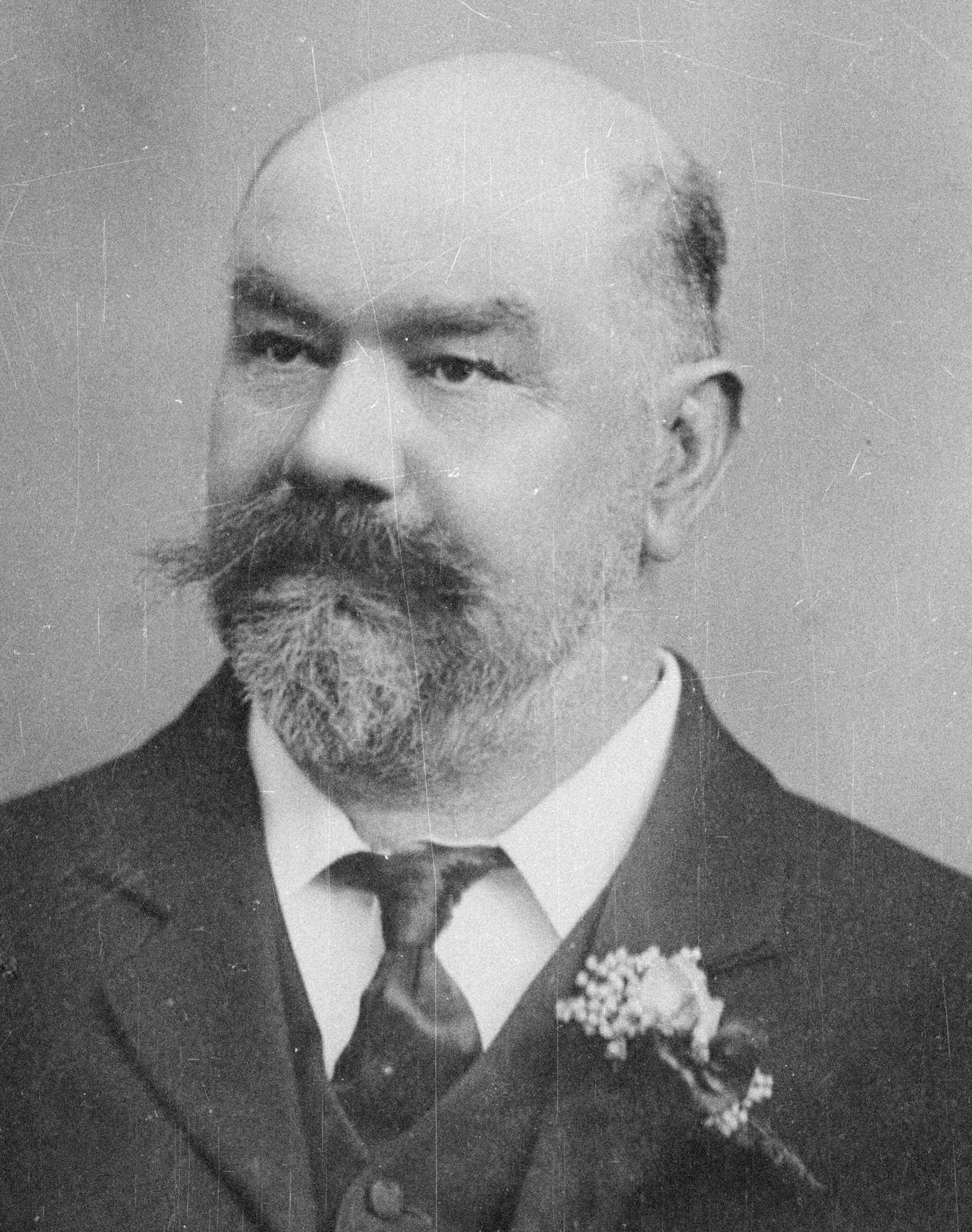
Candidate	Francis Bell	George Fisher
Party	Independent	Independent
Popular vote	1,239	852
Percentage	59.25	40.74
Mayor before election
George Fisher
Elected mayor
Francis Bell

The 1896 Wellington mayoral election was part of the New Zealand local elections held that same year. The polling was conducted using the standard first-past-the-post electoral method.

== Background ==
In 1896 incumbent mayor George Fisher was defeated by former mayor Francis Bell. Bell had served as mayor from 1891 to 1893.

== Mayoralty results ==
The following table gives the election results:

1896 Wellington mayoral election
Party	Candidate	Votes	%	±%
Independent	Francis Bell	1,239	59.25	
Independent	George Fisher	852	40.74	−16.70
Majority		387	18.50	
Turnout		2,091		
