= 1980 Christchurch mayoral election =

New Zealand mayoral election

- 11 October 1980
- Turnout: 51,319 (46.13%)
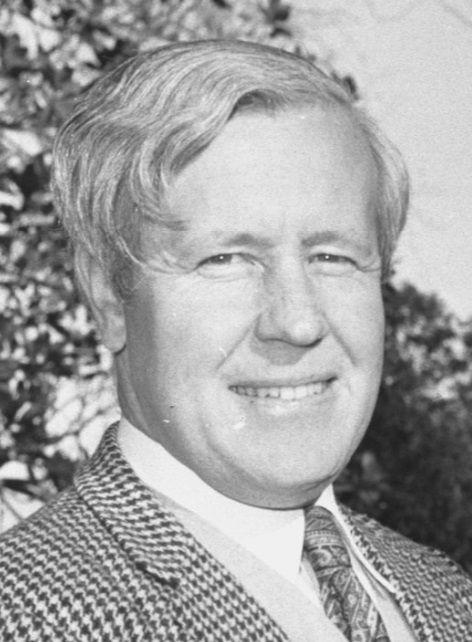

Candidate	Hamish Hay	Mollie Clark
Party	Citizens	Labour
Popular vote	27,357	23,082
Percentage	53.30	44.98
Mayor before election
Hamish Hay
Elected mayor
Hamish Hay

The 1980 Christchurch mayoral election was part of the New Zealand local elections held that same year. In 1980, election were held for the Mayor of Christchurch plus other local government positions. The polling was conducted using the standard first-past-the-post electoral method.

== Background ==
Incumbent Mayor Hamish Hay was re-elected with a decreased majority, defeating Labour city councillor Mollie Clark. Despite Hay retaining the mayoralty there was a huge swing against the Citizens' Association leaving the composition of the council at fifteen seats to four in favour of the Labour Party.

== Results ==
The following table gives the election results:

1980 Christchurch mayoral election
Party	Candidate	Votes	%	±%
Citizens	Hamish Hay	27,357	53.30	+0.17
Labour	Mollie Clark	23,082	44.98	
Economic Euthenics	Tubby Hansen	683	1.33	+0.78
Informal votes		197	0.39	−0.19
Majority		4,275	8.33	−6.71
Turnout		51,319	46.13	+1.18

== Ward results ==
Candidates were also elected from wards to the Christchurch City Council.

Party/ticket	Councillors
Labour	15
Citizens'	4
