= 1986 Invercargill mayoral election =

1986 mayoral election in Invercargill, New Zealand

- 11 October 1986
- Turnout: 20,788
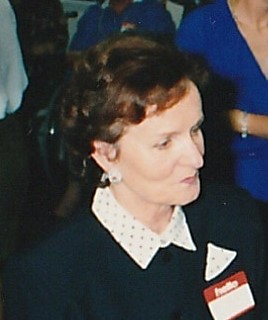
Candidate	Eve Poole	Terry King
Party	Independent	Independent
Popular vote	13,547	7,241
Percentage	65.16	34.83
Mayor before election
Eve Poole
Elected mayor
Eve Poole

The 1986 Invercargill mayoral election was held on 11 October 1986 as part of the 1986 New Zealand local elections, and was conducted under the First Past the Post system.

Incumbent mayor Eve Poole was re-elected with an increased majority.

== Results ==
The following table gives the election results:

1986 Invercargill mayoral election
Party	Candidate	Votes	%	±%
Independent	Eve Poole	13,547	65.16	+8.36
Independent	Terry King	7,241	34.83	
Majority		6,306	30.33	+7.2
Turnout		20,788		
