= 1886 Invercargill mayoral election =

1886 mayoral election in Invercargill, New Zealand

← 1885	24 November 1886	1887 →
- Turnout: 548
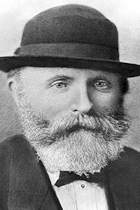

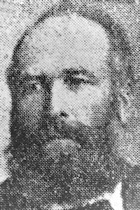
Candidate	David Roche	John Lyon McDonald
Party	Independent	Independent
Popular vote	309	239
Percentage	56.38	43.61
Mayor before election
John Lyon McDonald
Elected mayor
David Roche

The 1886 Invercargill mayoral election was held on 24 November 1886.

Incumbent mayor John Lyon McDonald was defeated by David Roche.

== Results ==
The following table gives the election results:

1886 Invercargill mayoral election
Party	Candidate	Votes	%	±%
Independent	David Roche	309	56.38	
Independent	John Lyon McDonald	239	43.61	−22.54
Majority		70	12.77	
Turnout		548		
