= 1898 Wellington mayoral election =

New Zealand local election

- 30 November 1898
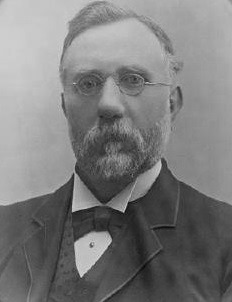

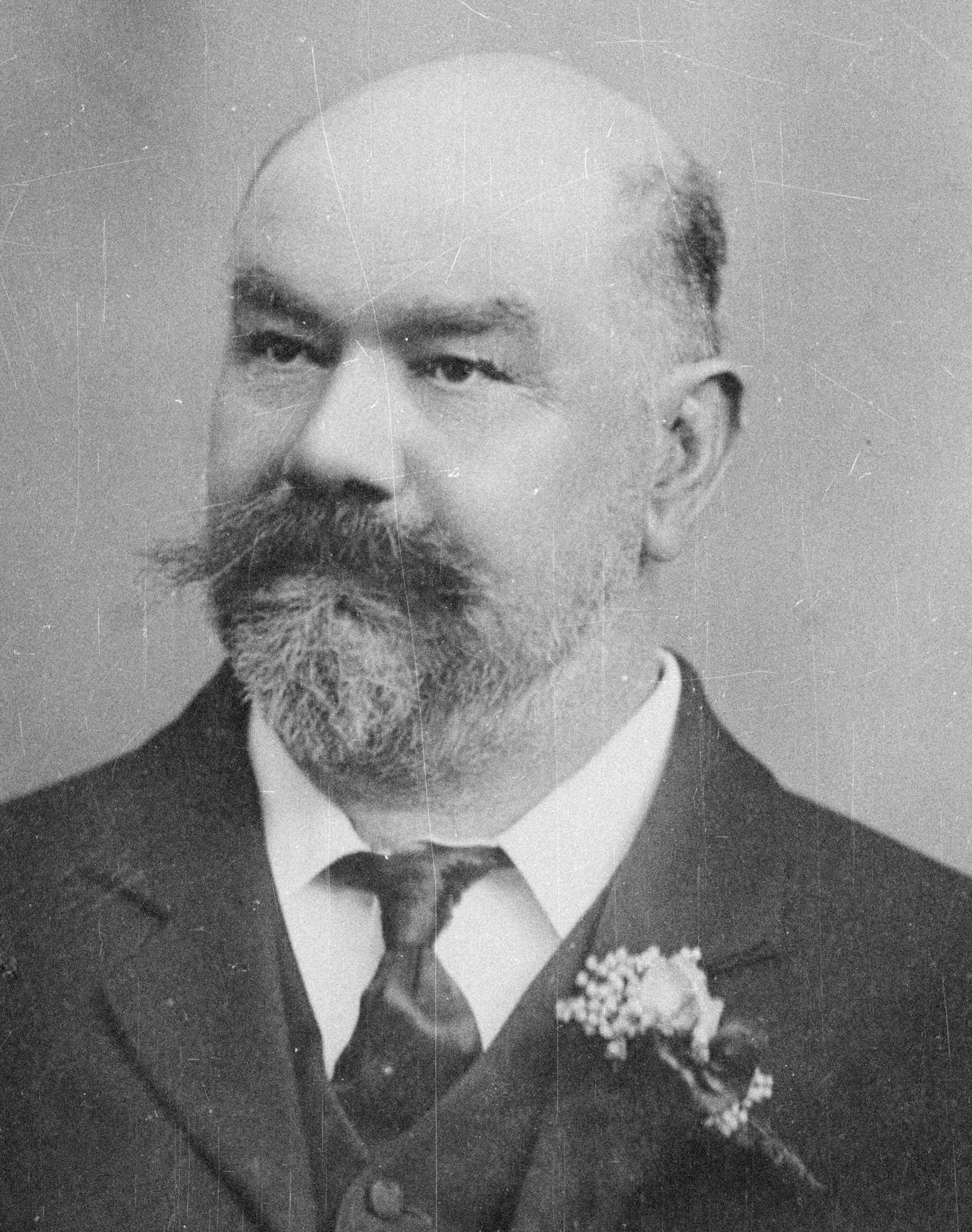
Candidate	John Rutherfurd Blair	George Fisher
Party	Independent	Independent
Popular vote	Elected unopposed	Withdrew
Mayor before election
John Rutherfurd Blair
Elected mayor
John Rutherfurd Blair

The 1898 Wellington mayoral election was part of the New Zealand local elections held that same year to decide who would take the office of Mayor of Wellington for the following year.

== Background ==
The incumbent mayor John Rutherfurd Blair stood for a second term and was re-elected unopposed. The MP for City of Wellington (and former mayor) George Fisher initially intended to stand against Blair, as he had done at the previous election. However he retired from the race before nominations closed. It was the fourth election since 1875 that the mayoralty was uncontested.
