= 1880 Invercargill mayoral election =

1880 mayoral election in Invercargill, New Zealand

- 24 November 1880
- Turnout: 471
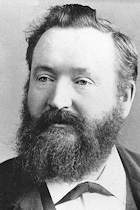

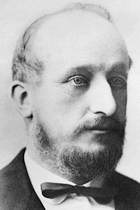

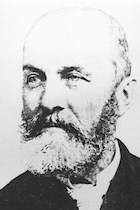
Candidate	Nicholas Johnson	Joseph Hatch	John Kingsland
Party	Independent	Independent	Independent
Popular vote	246	115	110
Percentage	52.22	24.41	23.35
Mayor before election
George Goodwillie
Elected mayor
Nicholas Johnson

The 1880 Invercargill mayoral election was held on 24 November 1880.

Nicholas Johnson defeated former mayor Joseph Hatch and councillor John Kingsland.

== Results ==
The following table gives the election results:

1880 Invercargill mayoral election
Party	Candidate	Votes	%	±%
Independent	Nicholas Johnson	246	52.22	
Independent	Joseph Hatch	115	24.41	
Independent	John Kingsland	110	23.35	
Majority		131	27.81	
Turnout		471		
