= 1880 Wellington mayoral election =

New Zealand local election

- 24 November 1880
- Turnout: 1,388
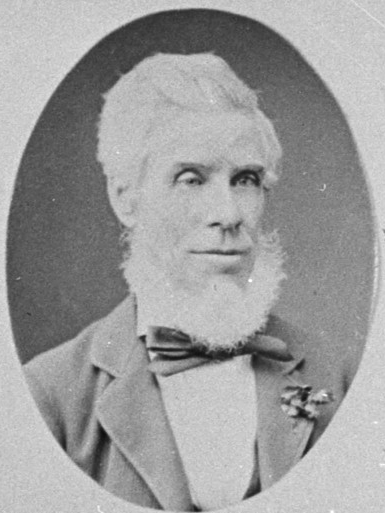

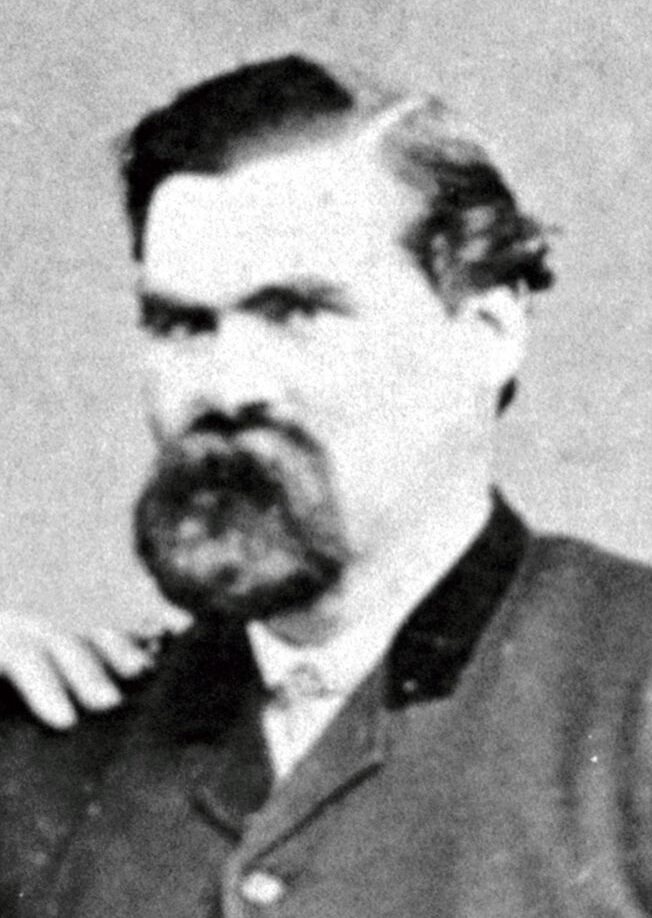
Candidate	William Hutchison	Andrew Young
Party	Independent	Independent
Popular vote	561	475
Percentage	40.41	34.22
Mayor before election
William Hutchison
Elected mayor
William Hutchison

The 1880 Wellington mayoral election was part of the New Zealand local elections held that same year to decide who would take the office of Mayor of Wellington.

== Background ==
Incumbent mayor William Hutchison sought re-election and was returned for another term. His opponents were city councillors Andrew Young and Dr. Henry William Driver as well as Irish born auctioneer Thomas C. Dwan.

== Election results ==
The following table gives the election results:

1880 Wellington mayoral election
Party	Candidate	Votes	%	±%
Independent	William Hutchison	561	40.41	−24.06
Independent	Andrew Young	475	34.22	
Independent	Henry William Driver	191	13.76	
Independent	Thomas Dwan	161	11.59	
Majority		86	6.19	−22.75
Turnout		1,388		
