= List of by-elections to the Hutt City Council =

By-elections to the Hutt City Council (formerly Lower Hutt City Council until 1989) occur to fill vacant seats in the council. The death, resignation, bankruptcy or expulsion of a sitting Councillor can cause a by-election to occur.

== List of by-elections ==
The following is a list of by-elections held to fill vacancies on the Hutt City Council:

Key

Independent	Citizens'	Labour	Community Concern

Ward	Date	Incumbent	Cause	Winner
At large	26 September 1912	John Watson Stevenson	Death	Thomas Charles Dawson
At large	6 May 1914	Thomas Charles Dawson	Resignation	John Brasell
At-large	3 May 1918	Sidney Clendon	Resignation	Sidney Clendon
At-large	3 May 1918	Henry Ward	Resignation	Albert West
At large	14 December 1921	Will Strand	Resignation	Allan Macaskill
At large	27 January 1928	Ernest Hunt	Resignation	Arthur Carver
At large	27 January 1937	Walter Cole	Death	John Brasell
At large	12 April 1949	William Gregory	Elected as Mayor	James McDonald
At large	3 November 1951	Norman Player	Resignation	Will Giltrap
At large	17 August 1985	Jan Taylor	Resignation	Pat Hall
Northern	11 December 1993	Peter Bates	Death	Tata Parata
Wainuiomata	18 February 1995	Tony London	Resignation	Ray Wallace
Central	24 September 2021	David Bassett	Resignation	Glenda Barratt

== Results ==
=== 1912 by-election ===
1912 Lower Hutt City Borough by-election
Party	Candidate	Votes	%	±%
Independent	Thomas Charles Dawson	483	72.96	
Independent	George Mumford	174	26.28	
Informal votes		5	0.75	
Majority		309	46.67	
Turnout		662	20.73	

=== 1914 by-election ===
1914 Lower Hutt City Borough by-election
Party	Candidate	Votes	%	±%
Independent	John Brasell	552	60.46	
Independent	Thomas Charles Dawson	356	39.00	
Informal votes		5	0.54	
Majority		196	21.46	
Turnout		913		

=== 1918 by-election ===
1918 Lower Hutt Borough Council by-election
Party	Candidate	Votes	%	±%
Independent	Sidney Clendon	310	49.20	−47.26
Independent	Albert West	285	45.23	
Independent	Henry Ward	255	40.47	−42.51
Independent	William Hardy	221	35.07	
Independent	Charles Robinson	167	26.50	
Informal votes		21	3.33	+0.46
Majority		30	4.76	
Turnout		630	22.22	

=== 1921 by-election ===
1921 Lower Hutt Borough Council by-election
Party	Candidate	Votes	%	±%
Independent	Allan Macaskill	Unopposed		

=== 1928 by-election ===
1928 Lower Hutt Borough Council by-election
Party	Candidate	Votes	%	±%
Independent	Arthur Carver	Unopposed		

=== 1937 by-election ===
1937 Lower Hutt Borough Council by-election
Party	Candidate	Votes	%	±%
Citizens'	John Brasell	1,152	52.48	
Labour	Ronald George Maxwell	1,037	47.24	
Informal votes		6	0.27	
Majority		115	5.23	
Turnout		2,195		

=== 1949 by-election ===
1949 Lower Hutt City Council by-election
Party	Candidate	Votes	%	±%
Labour	James McDonald	2,262	50.88	
Citizens'	Herbert Muir	2,168	48.77	−0.85
Informal votes		16	0.35	
Majority		94	2.11	
Turnout		4,446	19.33	−29.71

=== 1951 by-election ===
1951 Lower Hutt City Council by-election
Party	Candidate	Votes	%	±%
Citizens'	Will Giltrap	Unopposed		

=== 1985 by-election ===
1985 Lower Hutt City Council by-election
Party	Candidate	Votes	%	±%
United Citizens	Pat Hall	2,118	42.59	
Labour	John Eaton	2,031	40.84	−0.60
Independent	Doug Witcher	458	9.21	−18.27
Independent	Rhys Morris	356	7.16	
Informal votes		9	0.18	
Majority		87	1.74	
Turnout		4,972	11.50	

=== 1993 by-election ===
1993 Hutt City Council by-election, Northern ward
Party	Candidate	Votes	%	±%
Community Concern	Tata Parata	1,694	31.32	
United Citizens	Pat Hall	1,304	24.11	−14.98
Independent	Peter MacMillan	1,266	23.41	
Independent	Diana East	1,053	19.47	−19.79
Informal votes		90	1.66	+0.75
Majority		390	7.21	
Turnout		5,407		

=== 1995 by-election ===
1995 Hutt City Council by-election, Wainuiomata ward
Party	Candidate	Votes	%	±%
Independent	Ray Wallace	1,910	45.54	
Independent	Reg Moore	1,187	28.30	−22.40
Independent	Viv Auty	1,097	26.15	
Majority		723	17.23	
Turnout		4,194		

=== 2021 by-election ===
2021 Hutt City Council by-election, Central ward
Party	Candidate	Votes	%	±%
Independent	Glenda Barratt	606	22.00	
Independent	Andrea Hilton	592	21.49	
Independent	Henry Clayton	567	20.58	
Independent	Faran Shahzhad	370	13.43	
Independent	Simon Monrad	161	5.84	
Independent	Ash Roper	99	3.59	
Independent	Colin Wilson	92	3.34	
Independent	Thomas Morgan	75	2.72	
Independent	Andrew Fox	69	2.50	
Independent	Evelyn Richter	69	2.50	
Independent	Phil Caswell	33	1.19	
Informal votes		21	0.76	
Majority		14	0.50	
Turnout		2,754		
