= 1986 Christchurch mayoral election =

New Zealand mayoral election

- 11 October 1986
- Turnout: 64,376
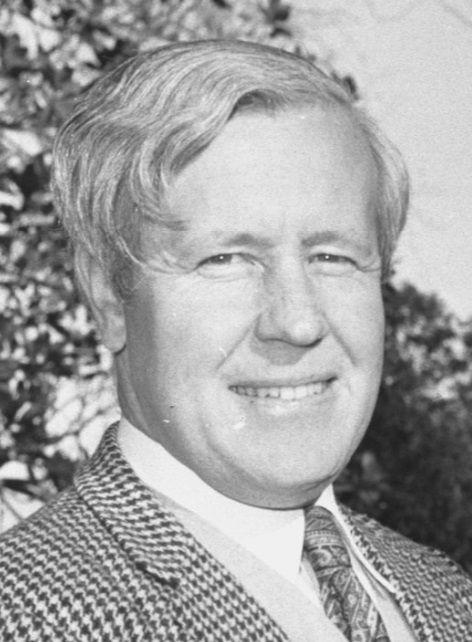

Candidate	Hamish Hay	Alex Clark
Party	Citizens'	Labour
Popular vote	39,239	22,918
Percentage	60.95	35.60
Mayor before election
Hamish Hay
Elected mayor
Hamish Hay

The 1986 Christchurch mayoral election was part of the New Zealand local elections held that same year. In 1986, election were held for the Mayor of Christchurch plus other local government positions. The polling was conducted using the standard first-past-the-post electoral method.

== Background ==
Sitting Mayor Hamish Hay was re-elected for a fifth term with a decreased majority, defeating councillor Alex Clark of the Labour Party, who had likewise lost to Hay in 1977. Concurrent to Hay retaining the mayoralty the Citizens' Association kept control of the Christchurch City Council with the composition of the council being ten seats to nine.

Postal voting was used for the first time in local elections in Christchurch, the advent of which was credited with a larger turnout of voters, an increase of 22 percent.

== Results ==
The following table gives the election results:

1986 Christchurch mayoral election
Party	Candidate	Votes	%	±%
Citizens'	Hamish Hay	39,239	60.95	−4.23
Labour	Alex Clark	22,918	35.60	
Economic Euthenics	Tubby Hansen	1,322	2.05	+1.40
Informal votes		897	1.39	+0.86
Majority		16,321	25.35	
Turnout		64,376		

== City council election result ==
Candidates were also elected from wards to the Christchurch City Council.

Party/ticket	Councillors
Citizens	10
Labour	9

Christchurch city councillors elected
Ward	Party	Elected
North	Citizens	John Burn*
North	Citizens	Ron Wright
North	Citizens	Dennis Rich
North	Labour	Linda Constable
South	Citizens	Morgan Fahey*
South	Labour	Alex Clark*
South	Labour	Alister James*
South	Labour	Ruby Fowler*
West	Citizens	Maurice Carter*
West	Citizens	Carole Evans
West	Citizens	Ron Wilton
East	Citizens	Rex Arbuckle*
East	Citizens	Clive Cotton*
East	Labour	Charles Manning
East	Citizens	David Cox
Pegasus	Labour	Vicki Buck*
Pegasus	Labour	David Close*
Pegasus	Labour	Noala Massey*
Pegasus	Labour	Hori Brennan

Footnotes: * denotes incumbents
