= 1884 Invercargill mayoral election =

1884 mayoral election in Invercargill, New Zealand

- 26 November 1884
- Turnout: 599
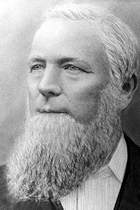

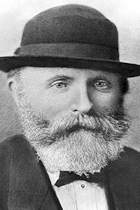
Candidate	George Froggatt	David Roche
Party	Independent	Independent
Popular vote	384	215
Percentage	64.10	35.89
Mayor before election
William Sherriffs Moir
Elected mayor
George Froggatt

The 1884 Invercargill mayoral election was held on 26 November 1884.

George Froggatt was elected mayor for the first time. His opponent, David Roche, would be elected mayor two years later in 1886.

== Results ==
The following table gives the election results:

1884 Invercargill mayoral election
Party	Candidate	Votes	%	±%
Independent	George Froggatt	384	64.10	+32.66
Independent	David Roche	215	35.89	
Majority		169	28.21	
Turnout		599		
