= 1890 Wellington mayoral election =

New Zealand local election

- 26 November 1890
- Turnout: 1,566
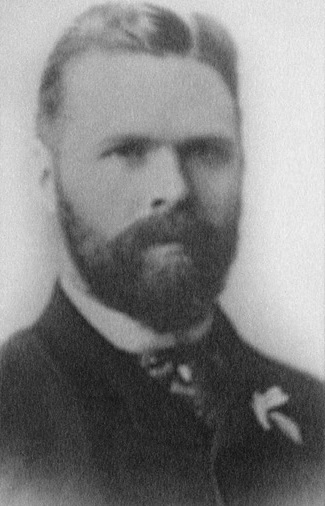

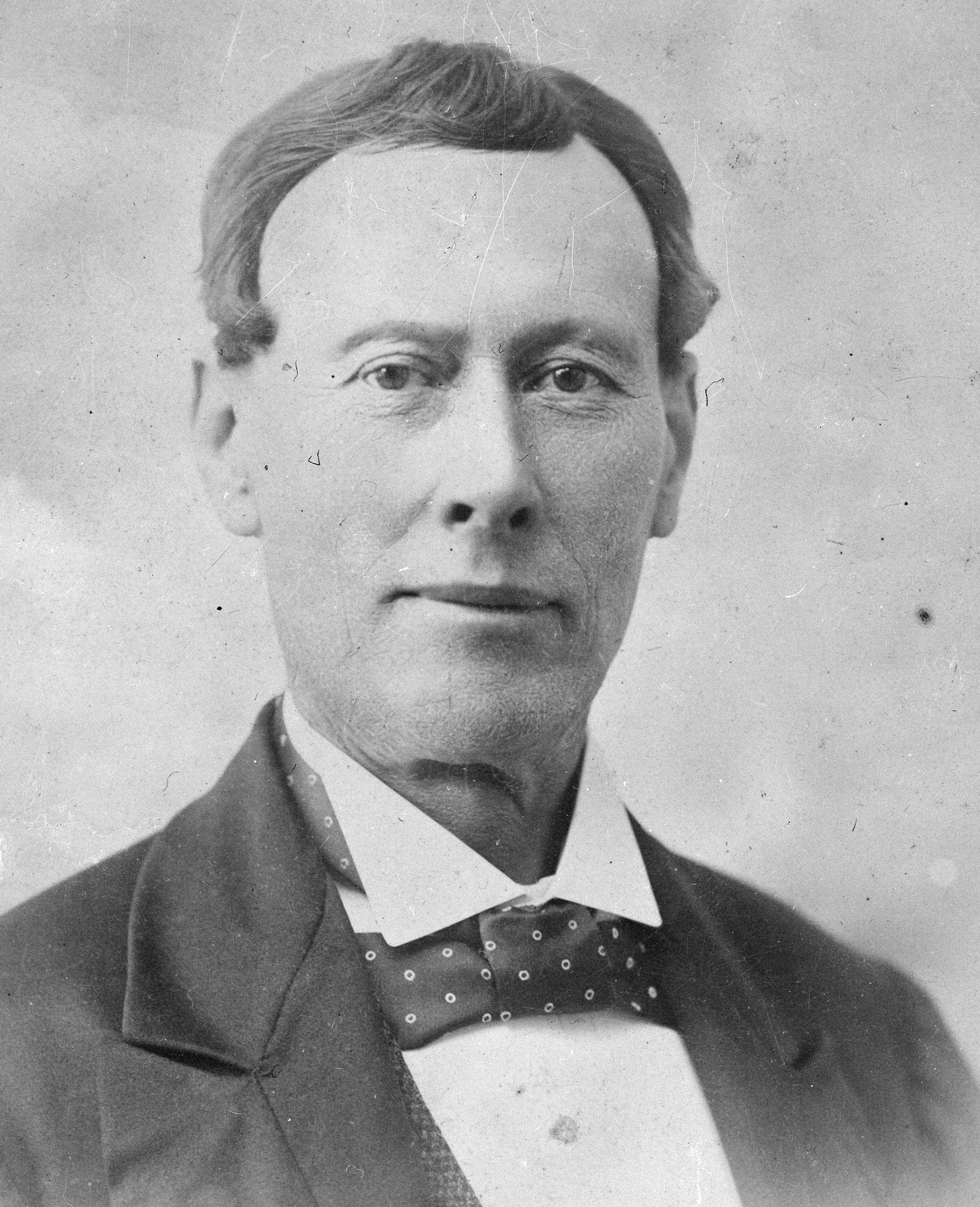
Candidate	Arthur Brown	Charles Worth
Party	Independent	Independent
Popular vote	927	639
Percentage	59.19	40.81
Mayor before election
Charles Johnston
Elected mayor
Arthur Brown

The 1890 Wellington mayoral election was part of the New Zealand local elections held that same year to decide who would take the office of Mayor of Wellington for the following year.

== Background ==
The incumbent mayor Charles Johnston declined to stand for a second term. Johnston's declination left the field open and two councillors Arthur Winton Brown (also a former mayor) and Charles Frederick Worth were nominated for the mayoralty. It was the first mayoral election since 1887 that had been contested.

== Election results ==
The following table gives the election results:

1890 Wellington mayoral election
Party	Candidate	Votes	%	±%
Independent	Arthur Winton Brown	927	59.19	
Independent	Charles Worth	639	40.81	
Majority		288	18.39	
Turnout		1,566		
