= 1897 Wellington mayoral election =

New Zealand local election

- 24 November 1897
- Turnout: 1,935
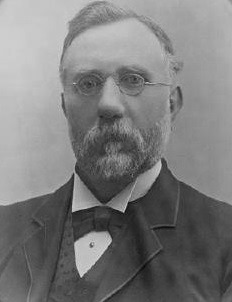

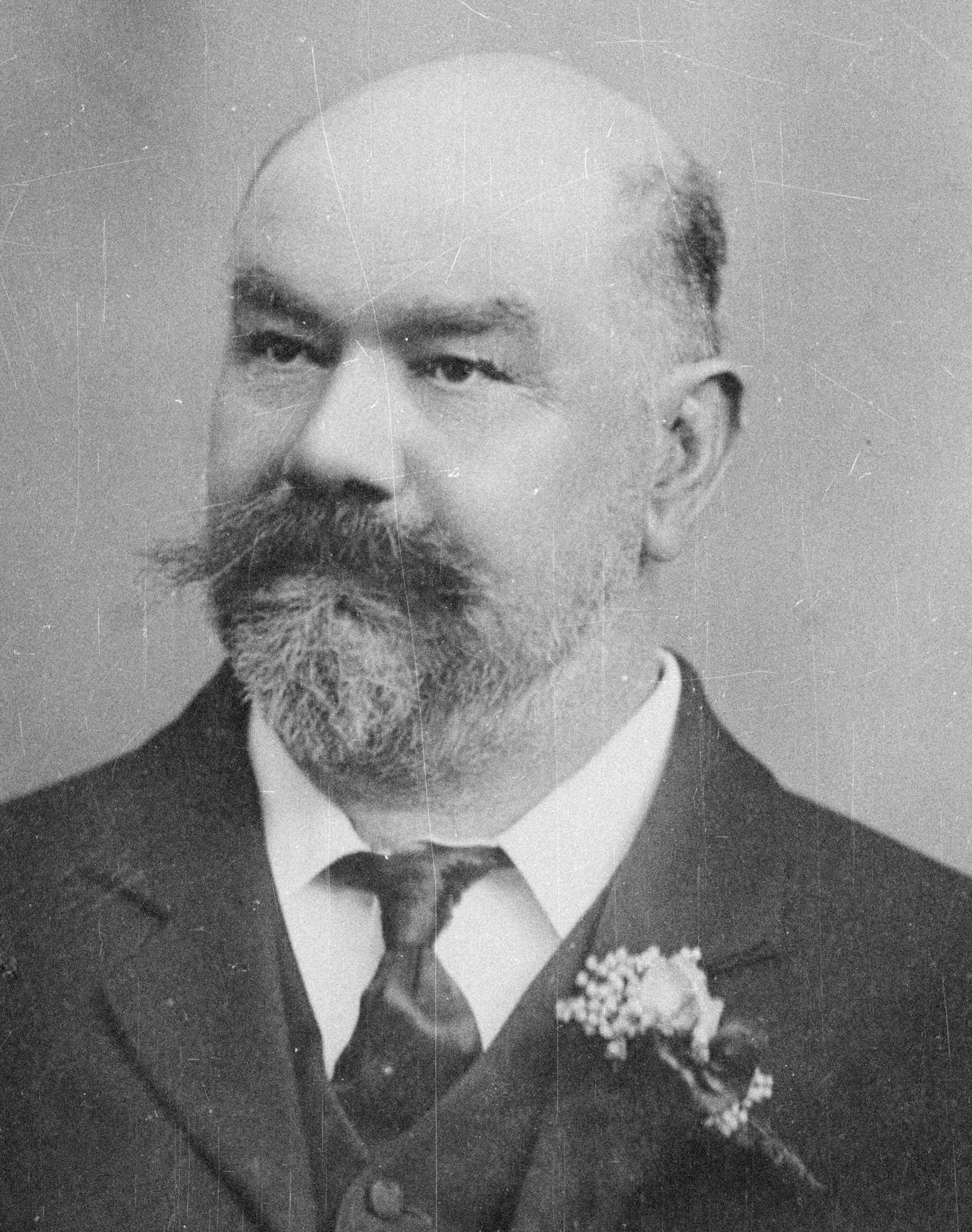
Candidate	John Rutherfurd Blair	George Fisher
Party	Independent	Independent
Popular vote	1,359	576
Percentage	70.23	29.77
Mayor before election
Francis Bell
Elected mayor
John Rutherfurd Blair

The 1897 Wellington mayoral election was part of the New Zealand local elections held that same year. The polling was conducted using the standard first-past-the-post electoral method.

== Background ==
In 1897 incumbent Mayor Francis Bell retired leading to the chairman of the Wellington Education Board John Rutherfurd Blair being elected to office as the new Mayor of Wellington, beating his sole opponent MP George Fisher (a former mayor).

== Results ==
The following table gives the election results:

1897 Wellington mayoral election
Party	Candidate	Votes	%	±%
Independent	John Rutherfurd Blair	1,359	70.23	
Independent	George Fisher	576	29.77	−10.97
Majority		783	40.46	
Turnout		1,935		
