= 2013 Invercargill mayoral election =

2013 mayoral election in Invercargill, New Zealand

- 12 October 2013
- Turnout: 17,509
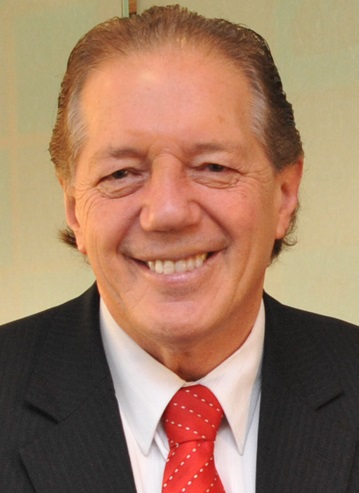

Candidate	Tim Shadbolt	Lindsay Dow
Party	Independent	Independent
Popular vote	12,050	4,926
Percentage	68.82	28.13
Mayor before election
Tim Shadbolt
Elected mayor
Tim Shadbolt

The 2013 Invercargill mayoral election finished on Saturday, 12 October 2013 and was conducted under the first-past-the-post voting system using the postal voting system. It was held as part of the 2013 New Zealand local elections.

== Background ==
The candidates for mayor included the incumbent Tim Shadbolt who contested a seventh consecutive term. Other candidates included Shadbolt defeated challengers, Lindsay Dow and Kevin Middleton. Shadbolt was re-elected with a decreased majority.

== Results ==
The following table gives the election results:

2013 Invercargill mayoral election
Party	Candidate	Votes	%	±%
Independent	Tim Shadbolt	12,050	68.82	−4.31
Independent	Lindsay Dow	4,926	28.13	
Independent	Kevin Middleton	533	3.04	
Majority		7,124	40.68	−8.58
Turnout		17,509		
