= 1878 Wellington mayoral election =

New Zealand local election

- 27 November 1878
- Turnout: 1,478
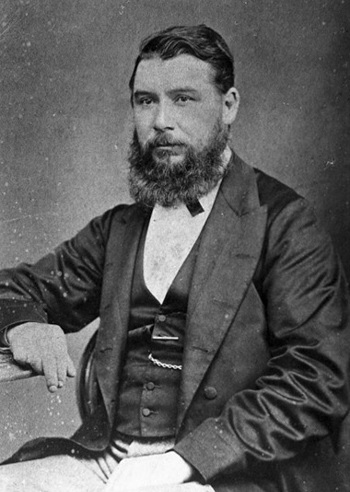

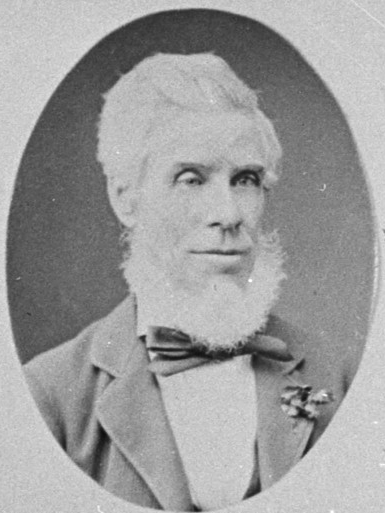
| Candidate | Joe Dransfield | William Hutchison |
| Party | Independent | Independent |
| Popular vote | 740 | 738 |
| Percentage | 50.07 | 49.93 |
Mayor before election
Joe Dransfield
Elected mayor
Joe Dransfield

The 1878 Wellington mayoral election was part of the New Zealand local elections held that same year to decide who would take the office of Mayor of Wellington.

== Background ==
Joe Dransfield, the incumbent Mayor, sought re-election for another year. He was opposed by former mayor William Hutchison, who had withdrawn from the previous year's election (along with another candidate) enabling Dransfield to be elected unopposed. Dransfield was elected once again. The result was very close with two votes being the majority for Drandfield. There were a number of cases of personation reported on election day. Supporters of Hutchison also attempted to get the election's legality reviewed in the Supreme Court, disputing the validity on several grounds, one being that five or six people enrolled having no legal right to vote.

== Election results ==
The following table gives the election results:

1878 Wellington mayoral election
| Party | Candidate | Votes | % | ±% |
|---|---|---|---|---|
| Independent | Joe Dransfield | 740 | 50.07 | |
| Independent | William Hutchison | 738 | 49.93 | |
| Majority | | 2 | 0.13 | |
| Turnout | | 1,478 | | |
