= 1905 Invercargill mayoral election =

1905 mayoral election in Invercargill, New Zealand

← 1904	26 April 1905	1906 →
- Turnout: 1,403
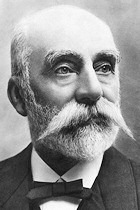
Candidate	William Benjamin Scandrett	Robert Barbour McKay
Party	Independent	Independent
Popular vote	1,095	308
Percentage	78.04	21.95
Mayor before election
William Benjamin Scandrett
Elected mayor
William Benjamin Scandrett

The 1905 Invercargill mayoral election was held on 26 April 1905 as part of that year's local elections.

== Results ==
The following table gives the election results:

1905 Invercargill mayoral election
Party	Candidate	Votes	%	±%
Independent	William Benjamin Scandrett	1,095	78.04	
Independent	Robert Barbour McKay	308	21.95	
Majority		787	56.09	
Turnout		1,403		
