= 1998 Lower Hutt mayoral election =

Local election in New Zealand

- 10 October 1998
- Turnout: 30,759 (46.93%)
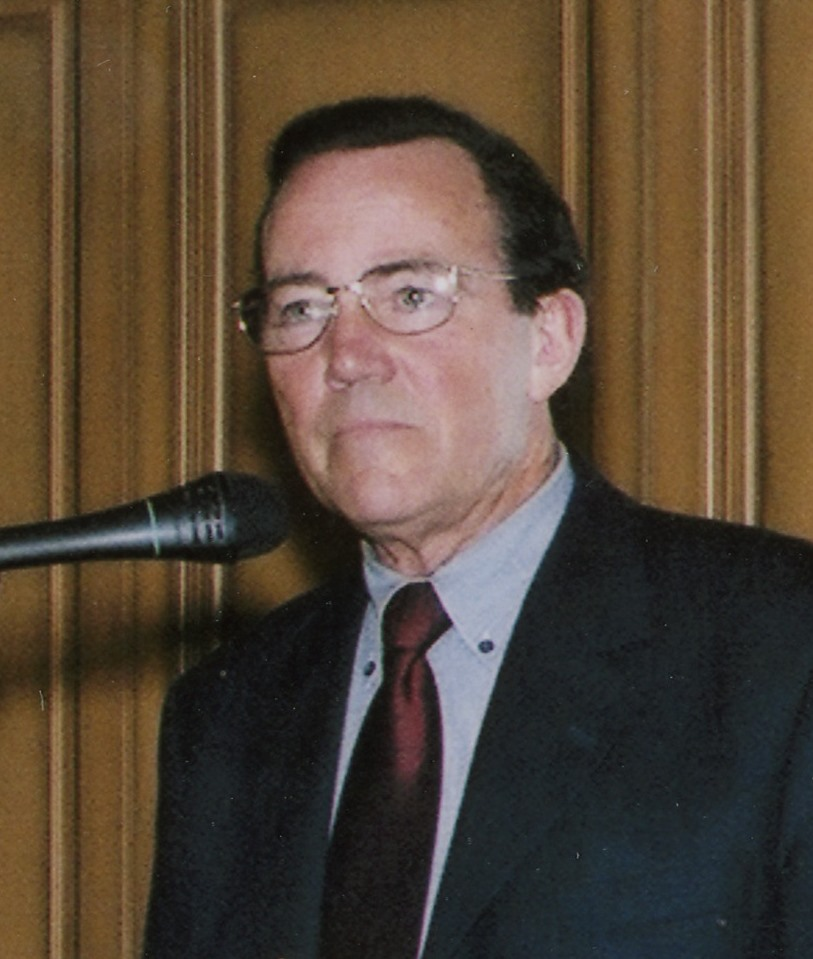

Candidate	John Terris	Peter Glensor
Party	Independent	Positive Focus
Popular vote	17,034	7,372
Percentage	55.37	23.96
Mayor before election
John Terris
Elected mayor
John Terris

The 1998 Lower Hutt mayoral election was part of the New Zealand local elections held that same year. The elections were held for the role of Mayor of Lower Hutt plus other local government positions including twelve city councillors, also elected triennially. The polling was conducted using the standard first-past-the-post electoral method.

== Background ==
The incumbent Mayor, John Terris, stood for a second term. As he had no formal support from any councillors during the term (due to the defeat of all Citizens Action ticket candidates who backed his candidacy) former city councillor David Ogden formed a new ticket, City Vision, to support Terris whom Ogden said was "by far the best candidate for mayor" and was committed to keeping rates down. The ticket was formed prior to Terris' decision to stand for re-election, which he confirmed two months later he would as an independent.

The election campaign was low-key with mayoral candidates speaking to poorly attended public meetings. Terris spoke as though he was campaigning against his own council which was made up largely of independents rather than left and right tickets. While such tickets were shunned at the 1995 election they made a comeback. The City Vision team, which endorsed Terris, included candidates associated with the National and ACT. Positive Focus, led by central ward councillor and mayoral candidate Peter Glensor, was a Labour-Alliance backed grouping. Another talking point in the mayoral race was the big-spending campaign of Wellington Regional Councillor Sandra Greig. Terris was re-elected in a landslide with both of his opponents also failing to win council seats. Five council seats were won by his City Vision backers, giving him a core of support on the council that he previously did not have.

== Mayoral results ==
1998 Lower Hutt mayoral election
Party	Candidate	Votes	%	±%
Independent	John Terris	17,034	55.37	+21.76
Positive Focus	Peter Glensor	7,372	23.96	+3.78
Independent	Sandra Greig	5,715	18.57	
Informal votes		638	2.07	−0.54
Majority		9,662	31.41	+17.98
Turnout		30,759	46.93	+2.43

== Ward results ==
Twelve candidates were also elected from wards to the Hutt City Council.

Party/ticket	Councillors
Independent	6
City Vision	5
Positive Focus	1
