= 1883 Wellington mayoral election =

New Zealand local election

- 28 November 1883
- Turnout: 1,287 (56.59%)
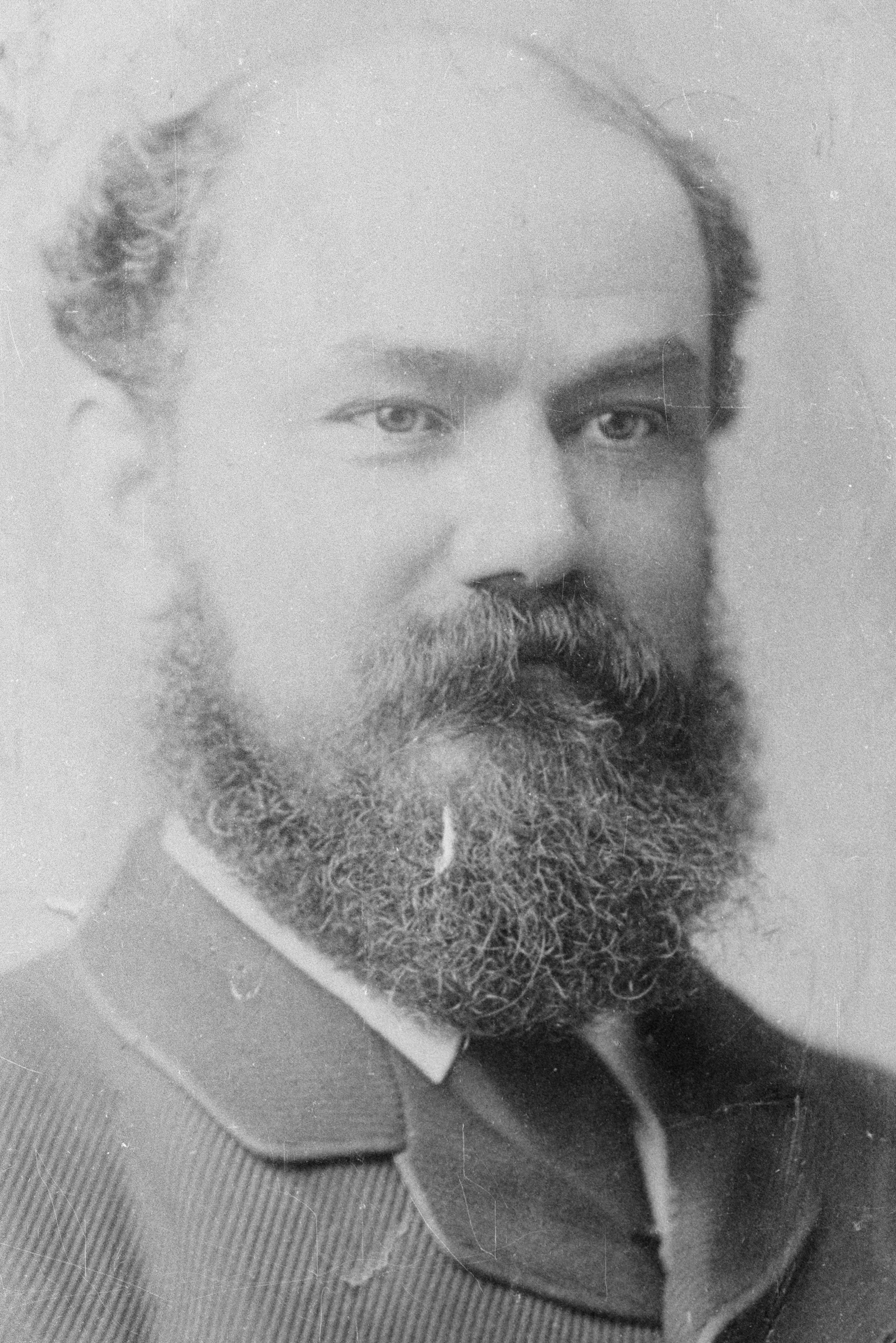

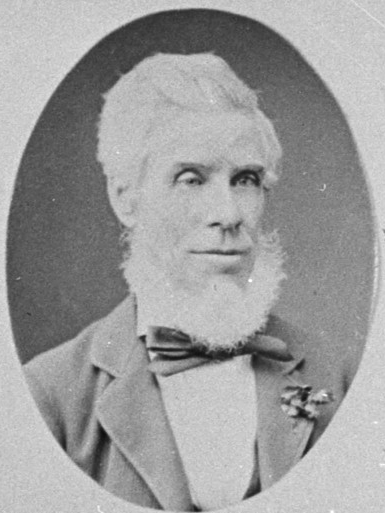
Candidate	George Fisher	William Hutchison
Party	Independent	Independent
Popular vote	924	363
Percentage	71.79	28.21
Mayor before election
George Fisher
Elected mayor
George Fisher

The 1883 Wellington mayoral election was part of the New Zealand local elections held that same year to decide who would take the office of Mayor of Wellington.

== Background ==
Incumbent mayor George Fisher sought re-election for a third term and was successful, seeing off a challenge from former mayor William Hutchison. The election was noted for its account of the intensely personal manner in which the two candidates publicly attacked each other in speeches. Reporters at the time stating "The contest assumed the character of a personal duel, the abuse becoming deplorably bitter towards the last day."

== Election results ==
The following table gives the election results:

1883 Wellington mayoral election
Party	Candidate	Votes	%	±%
Independent	George Fisher	924	71.79	−8.92
Independent	William Hutchison	363	28.21	
Majority		561	43.58	−17.85
Turnout		1,287	56.59	+16.36
