= 1893 Wellington mayoral election =

New Zealand local election

- 29 November 1893
- Turnout: 1,793
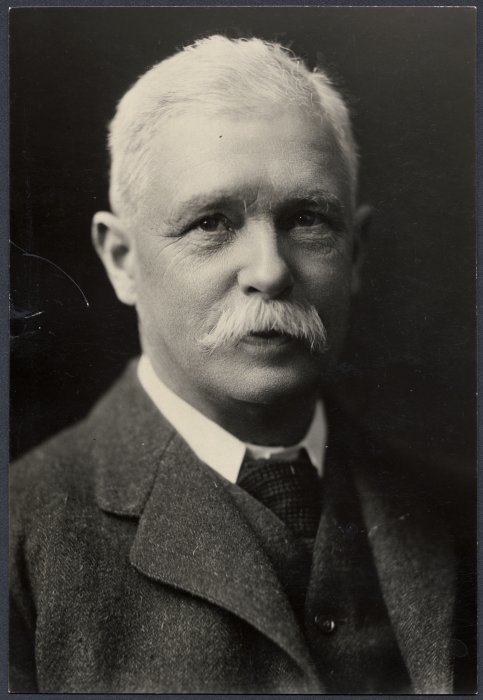

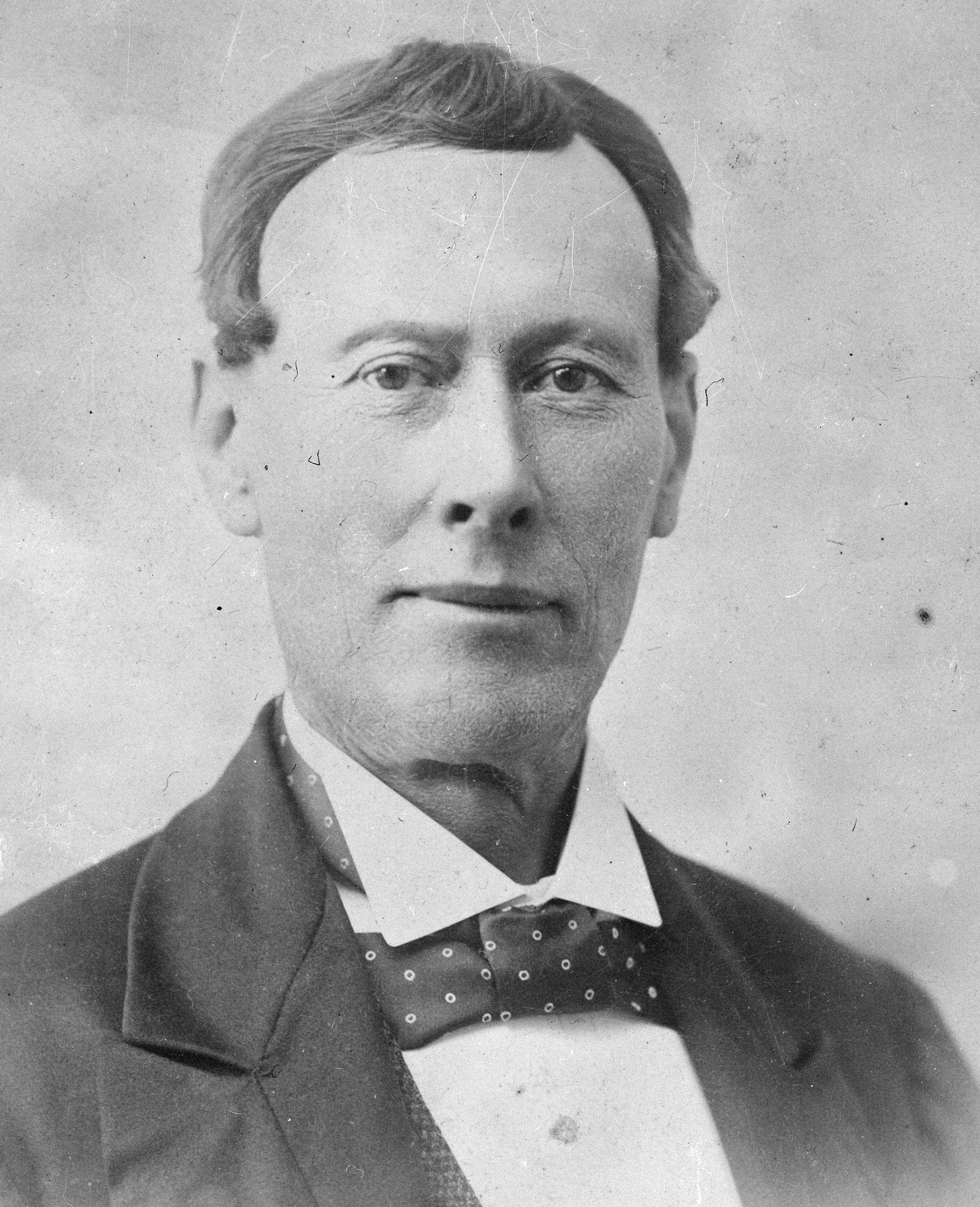
Candidate	Alfred Brandon	Charles Worth
Party	Independent	Independent
Popular vote	1,194	595
Percentage	66.59	33.18
Mayor before election
Francis Bell
Elected mayor
Alfred Brandon

The 1893 Wellington mayoral election was part of the New Zealand local elections held that same year to decide who would take the office of Mayor of Wellington for the following year.

== Background ==
The incumbent mayor Francis Bell did not stand for a third term and retired. In an open race there were two nominations. Former city councillor Alfred Brandon and sitting councillor Charles Frederick Worth (who had contested the mayoralty twice previously) were nominated. It was held a day before the 1893 general election which completely overshadowed the mayoral election.

== Election results ==
The following table gives the election results:

1893 Wellington mayoral election
Party	Candidate	Votes	%	±%
Independent	Alfred Brandon	1,194	66.59	
Independent	Charles Worth	595	33.18	
Informal votes		4	0.22	−0.03
Majority		599	33.40	
Turnout		1,793		
