= 1874 Invercargill mayoral election =

1874 mayoral election in Invercargill, New Zealand

← 1873	21 July 1874	1875 →
- Turnout: 312
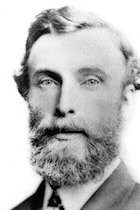
Candidate	Thomas Pratt	William Garthwaite
Party	Independent	Independent
Popular vote	203	109
Percentage	65.06	34.93
Mayor before election
George Lumsden
Elected mayor
Thomas Pratt

The 1874 Invercargill mayoral election was held on 21 July 1874.

Thomas Pratt was elected mayor.

== Results ==
The following table gives the election results:

1874 Invercargill mayoral election
Party	Candidate	Votes	%	±%
Independent	Thomas Pratt	203	65.06	
Independent	William Garthwaite	109	34.93	
Majority		94	30.13	
Turnout		312		
