= 1887 Invercargill mayoral by-election =

1887 by-election in Invercargill, New Zealand

← 1886	10 June 1887	1887 →
- Turnout: 579
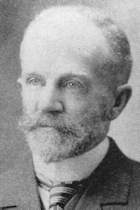
Candidate	Edwin Alfred Tapper	Aaron Blacke
Party	Independent	Independent
Popular vote	337	242
Percentage	58.20	41.79
Mayor before election
Aaron Blacke
(unofficial)
Elected mayor
Edwin Alfred Tapper

The 1887 Invercargill mayoral by-election was held on 10 June 1887 to fill the vacancy left by the resignation of David Roche. Aaron Blacke had been appointed mayor by the council, but this was not done in strict accordance with the law, and Blacke is not included in official lists of Mayors of Invercargill.

Edwin Alfred Tapper was elected.

== Results ==
The following table gives the election results:

1887 Invercargill mayoral by-election
Party	Candidate	Votes	%	±%
Independent	Edwin Alfred Tapper	337	58.20	
Independent	Aaron Blacke	242	41.79	
Majority		95	16.41	
Turnout		579		
