= 1885 Invercargill mayoral election =

1885 mayoral election in Invercargill, New Zealand

- 26 November 1885
- Turnout: 582
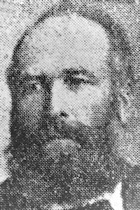

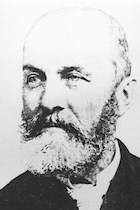
| Candidate | John Lyon McDonald | John Kingsland |
| Party | Independent | Independent |
| Popular vote | 385 | 197 |
| Percentage | 66.15 | 33.84 |
Mayor before election
George Froggatt
Elected mayor
John Lyon McDonald

The 1885 Invercargill mayoral election was held on 26 November 1885.

In a rematch from the 1882 election, John Lyon McDonald was elected, defeating former mayor John Kingsland.

== Results ==
The following table gives the election results:

1885 Invercargill mayoral election
| Party | Candidate | Votes | % | ±% |
|---|---|---|---|---|
| Independent | John Lyon McDonald | 385 | 66.15 | |
| Independent | John Kingsland | 197 | 33.84 | |
| Majority | | 188 | 32.31 | |
| Turnout | | 582 | | |
