= 1962 Invercargill mayoral election =

1962 mayoral election in Invercargill, New Zealand

- 13 October 1962
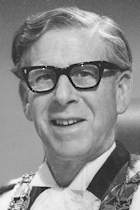

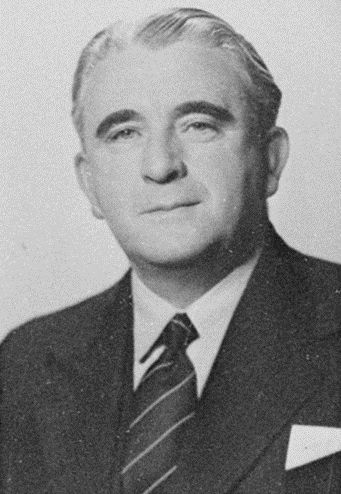
Candidate	Neil Watson	Thomas Francis Doyle
Party	Independent	Independent
Popular vote	5,907	4,710
Percentage	55.63	44.36
Mayor before election
Adam Adamson
Elected mayor
Neil Watson

The 1962 Invercargill mayoral election was part of the New Zealand local elections held that same year. The polling was conducted using the standard first-past-the-post electoral method. Three-term deputy mayor Neil Watson was elected mayor, defeating former Legislative Council member and parliamentary candidate Thomas Francis Doyle.

== Results ==
The following table gives the election results:

1962 Invercargill mayoral election
Party	Candidate	Votes	%	±%
Independent	Neil Watson	5,907	55.63	
Independent	Thomas Francis Doyle	4,710	44.36	
Majority		1,197	11.27	
Turnout		10,617		
