= 1925 Lower Hutt mayoral election =

- 29 April 1925
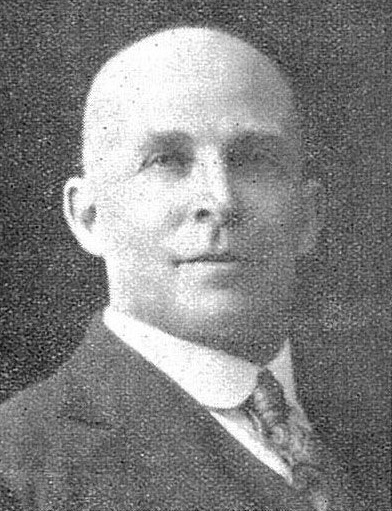
| Candidate | Will Strand |
| Party | Independent |
| Popular vote | Unopposed |
Mayor before election
Will Strand
Elected mayor
Will Strand

The 1925 Lower Hutt mayoral election was part of the New Zealand local elections held that same year. The elections were held for the role of Mayor of Lower Hutt plus other local government positions including the nine borough councillors, also elected biennially. The polling was conducted using the standard first-past-the-post electoral method.

== Background ==
The incumbent mayor, Will Strand, stood again for a second full term in office. No other candidates emerged and he was thusly declared elected unopposed.

== Councillor results ==
1925 Lower Hutt Borough Council election
| Party | Candidate | Votes | % | ±% |
|---|---|---|---|---|
| Citizens' | Alexander McBain | 1,217 | 89.41 | +0.60 |
| Citizens' | Archibald Grierson | 1,101 | 80.89 | +47.47 |
| Citizens' | Ernest Hunt | 1,075 | 78.98 | +3.12 |
| Independent | Archibald Hobbs | 1,065 | 78.25 | −4.61 |
| Citizens' | Lemuel Thomas Watkins | 1,045 | 76.78 | +12.10 |
| Citizens' | Herbert George Teagle | 1,033 | 75.90 | |
| Citizens' | John Mitchell | 981 | 72.07 | +3.86 |
| Independent | Walter Meldrum | 949 | 69.72 | −1.43 |
| Citizens' | Edward Waldie | 905 | 66.49 | |
| Citizens' | David John Bews | 885 | 65.02 | |
| Citizens' | Edward Robert Norman | 685 | 50.33 | |
| Independent | Aaron Baker | 675 | 49.59 | |
| Independent | Edward Robinson Render | 609 | 44.74 | |
