= 1882 Wellington mayoral election =

New Zealand local election

- 29 November 1882
- Turnout: 1,006 (40.23%)
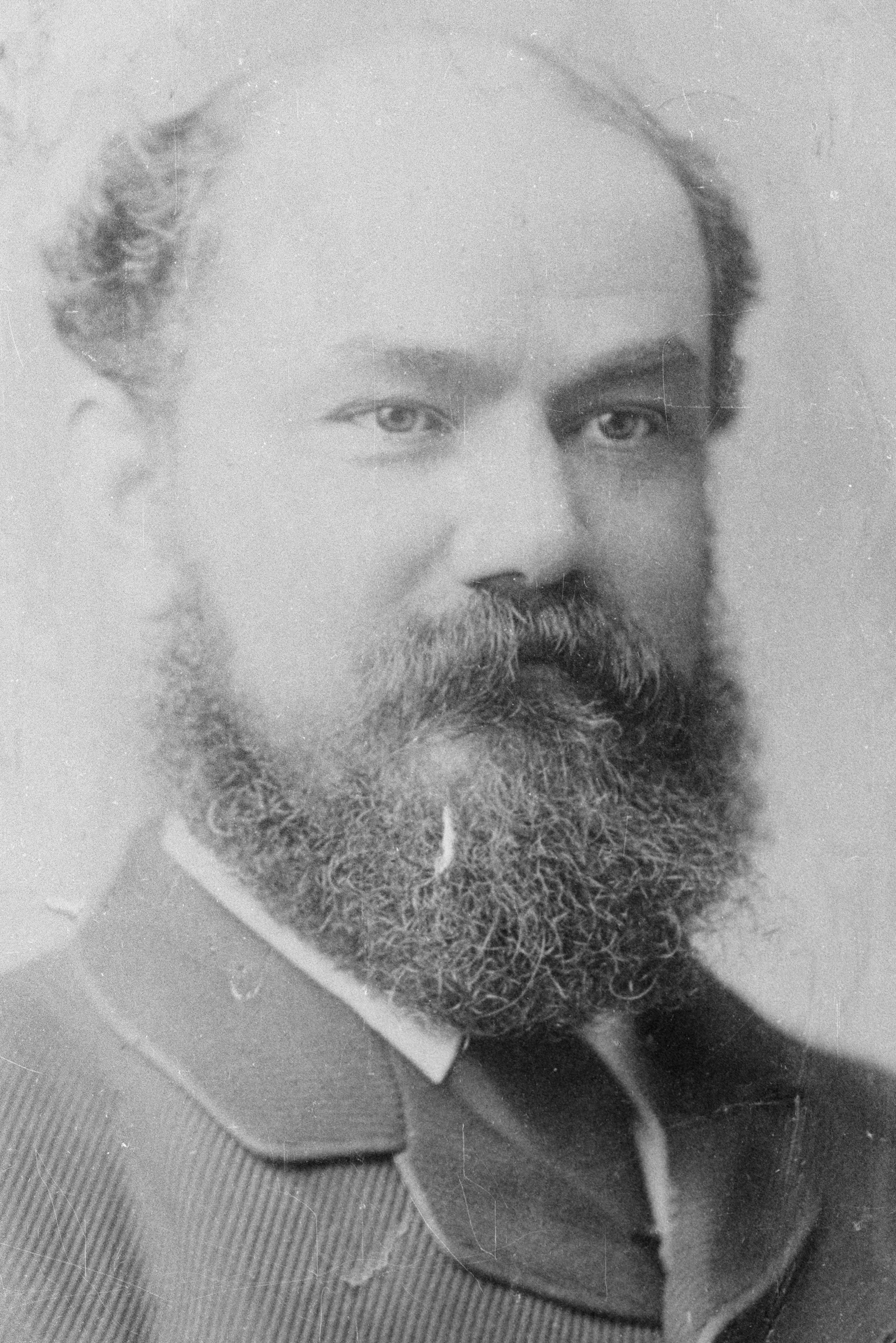

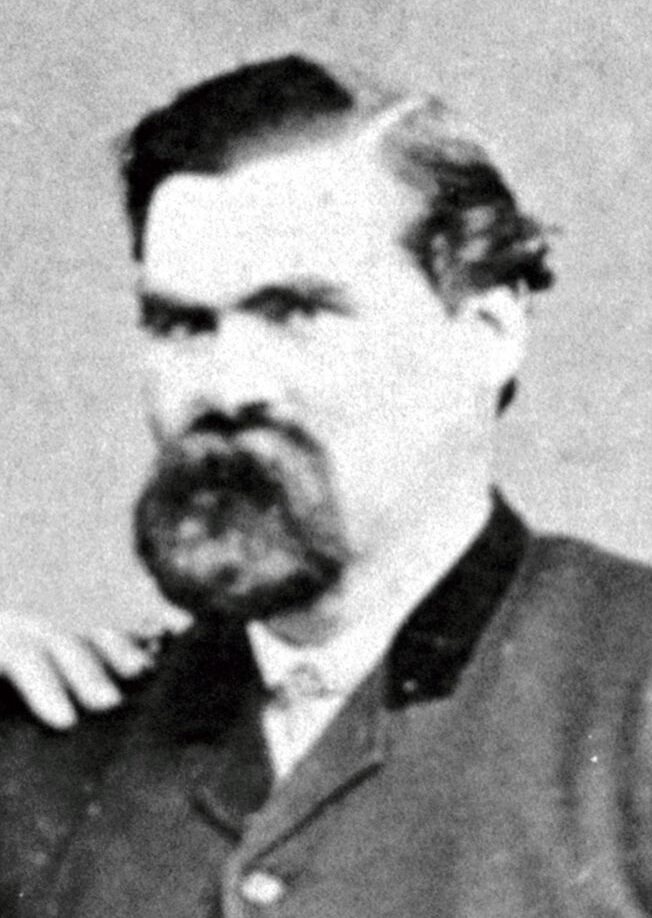
Candidate	George Fisher	Andrew Young
Party	Independent	Independent
Popular vote	812	194
Percentage	80.71	19.29
Mayor before election
George Fisher
Elected mayor
George Fisher

The 1882 Wellington mayoral election was part of the New Zealand local elections held that same year to decide who would take the office of Mayor of Wellington.

== Background ==
Incumbent mayor George Fisher sought re-election for a second term and was successful, seeing off a challenge from former city councillor Andrew Young in his third attempt at winning the mayoralty.

== Election results ==
The following table gives the election results:

1882 Wellington mayoral election
Party	Candidate	Votes	%	±%
Independent	George Fisher	812	80.71	+44.13
Independent	Andrew Young	194	19.29	−12.78
Majority		618	61.43	+56.92
Turnout		1,006	40.23	
