= 1887 Wellington mayoral election =

New Zealand local election

- 30 November 1887
- Turnout: 1,252
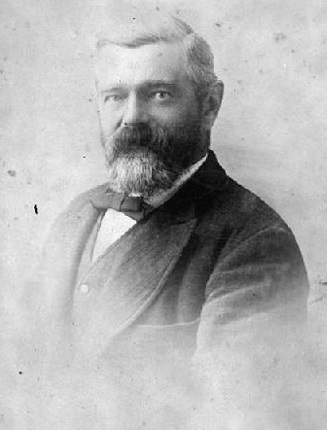

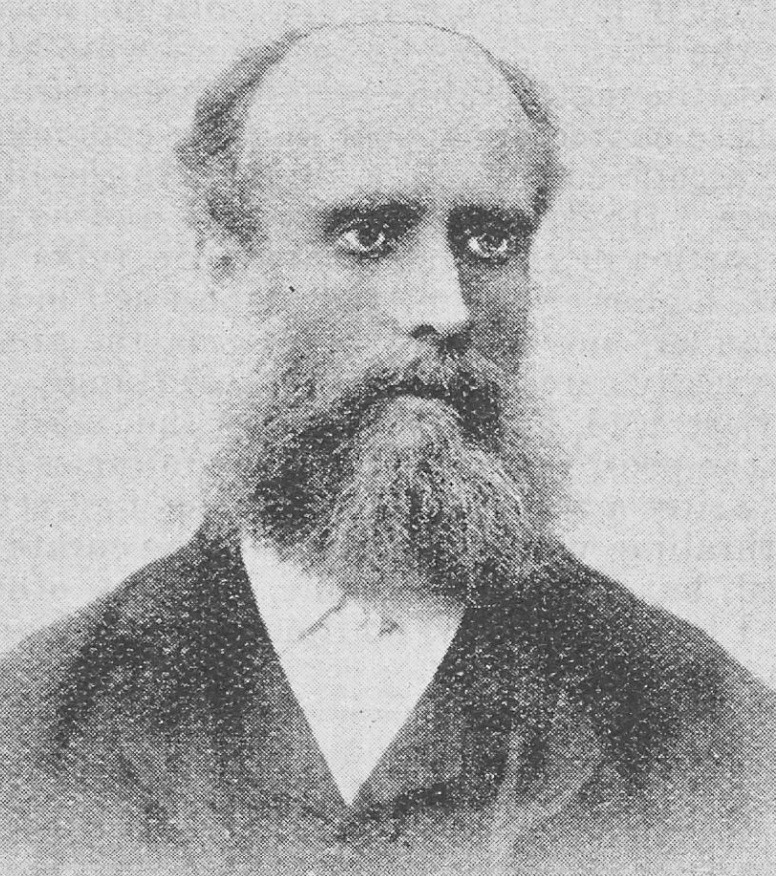
Candidate	Sam Brown	James Petherick
Party	Independent	Independent
Popular vote	794	454
Percentage	63.41	36.26
Mayor before election
Sam Brown
Elected mayor
Sam Brown

The 1887 Wellington mayoral election was part of the New Zealand local elections held that same year to decide who would take the office of Mayor of Wellington for the following year.

== Background ==
Incumbent mayor Sam Brown stood for a second term and defeated his sole opponent councillor James Petherick. The election was noted for its lack of public interest. Neither of the candidates was present when the result was announced by the returning officer and only a small crowd assembled to hear the result.

== Election results ==
The following table gives the election results:

1887 Wellington mayoral election
Party	Candidate	Votes	%	±%
Independent	Sam Brown	794	63.41	+6.16
Independent	James Petherick	454	36.26	
Informal votes		4	0.31	
Majority		340	27.15	+12.64
Turnout		1,252		
