= 1904 Wellington mayoral election =

New Zealand local election

- 27 April 1904
- Turnout: 6,147 (44.96%)
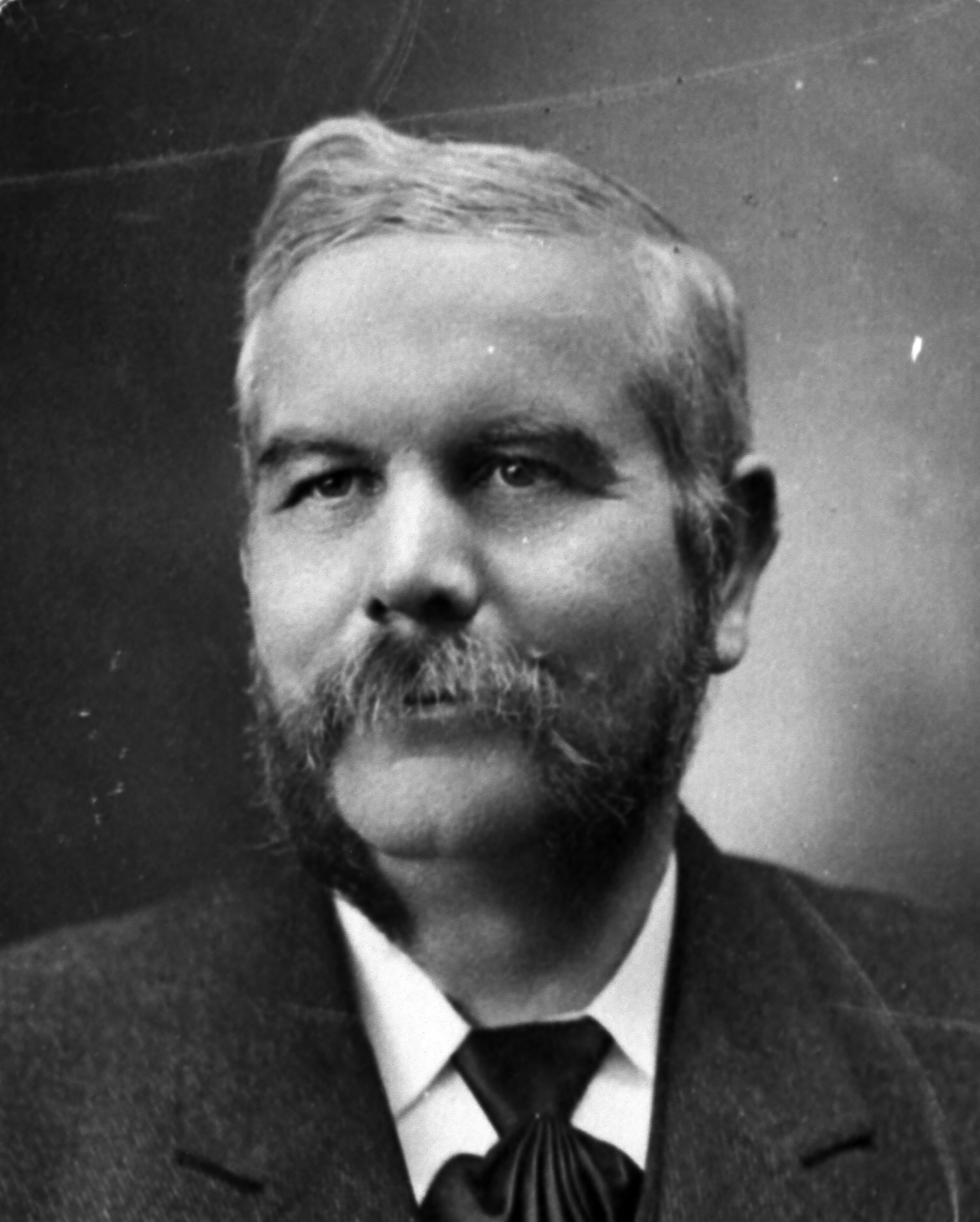

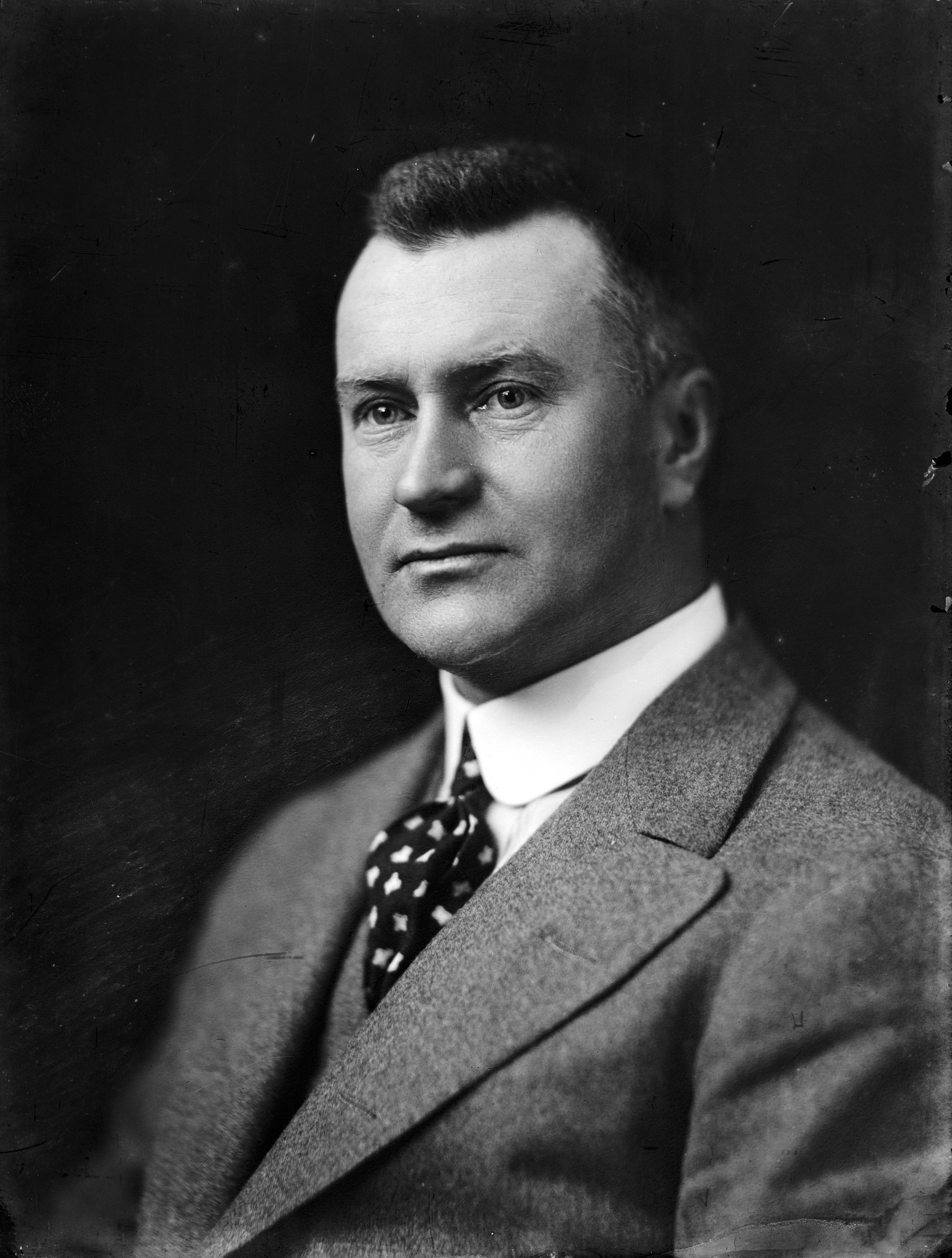

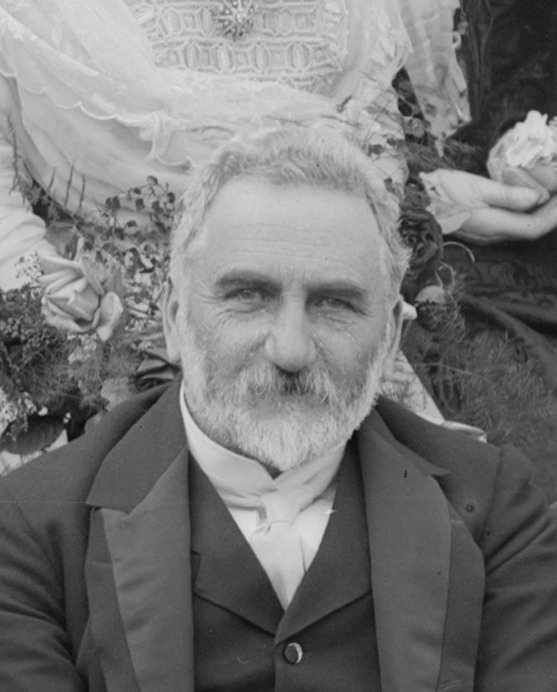
| Candidate | John Aitken | Thomas Wilford | Thomas William Hislop |
| Party | Independent | Independent | Independent |
| Popular vote | 3,052 | 1,565 | 1,530 |
| Percentage | 49.65 | 25.45 | 24.89 |
Mayor before election
John Aitken
Elected mayor
John Aitken

The 1904 Wellington mayoral election was part of the New Zealand local elections held that same year. The polling was conducted using the standard first-past-the-post electoral method.

== Background ==
In 1904 John Aitken, the incumbent Mayor, was re-elected to office as Mayor of Wellington, beating challenges from both Thomas Wilford and Thomas William Hislop.

== Mayoralty results ==
The following table gives the election results:

1904 Wellington mayoral election
| Party | Candidate | Votes | % | ±% |
|---|---|---|---|---|
| Independent | John Aitken | 3,052 | 49.65 | |
| Independent | Thomas Wilford | 1,565 | 25.45 | |
| Independent | Thomas William Hislop | 1,530 | 24.89 | |
| Majority | | 1,487 | 24.19 | |
| Turnout | | 6,147 | 44.96 | |
