= 1882 Invercargill mayoral election =

1882 mayoral election in Invercargill, New Zealand

- 29 November 1882
- Turnout: 462
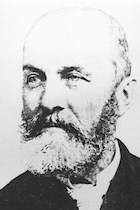

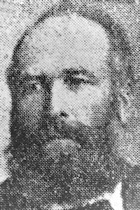
Candidate	John Kingsland	John Lyon McDonald
Party	Independent	Independent
Popular vote	249	213
Percentage	53.89	46.10
Mayor before election
Henry Jaggers
Elected mayor
John Kingsland

The 1882 Invercargill mayoral election was held on 29 November 1882.

John Kingsland was elected mayor.

== Results ==
The following table gives the election results:

1882 Invercargill mayoral election
Party	Candidate	Votes	%	±%
Independent	John Kingsland	249	53.89	
Independent	John Lyon McDonald	213	46.10	
Majority		36	7.79	
Turnout		462		
