= 2010 New Zealand local elections =

Local elections in New Zealand

- 9 October 2010
- 77 of 78 councils
Party	Councils	+/–
missing info		
This lists parties that won seats. See the complete results below.
- 67 mayors, ?? local councillors, and ?? regional councillors
Party	Seats	+/–
Mayors
missing info		
Local councillors
missing info		
Regional councillors
missing info		
This lists parties that won seats. See the complete results below.

The 2010 New Zealand local elections (Māori: Nga Pōtitanga ā-Rohe 2010) were triennial elections that were held from 17 September until 9 October 2010 to elect local mayors and councillors, regional councillors, and members of various other local government bodies.

10 of New Zealand's 11 regions and all 67 cities and districts participated in the election. This was the first election held for the newly-formed Auckland Council; an amalgamation of the previous councils in the Auckland region.

== Key dates ==
Key dates for the election as set out by the Local Government Commission and Elections New Zealand are:

21 July	Public notice of election
23 July	Candidate nominations open Preliminary electoral roll opens for inspection
20 August	Nominations close at 12 noon Electoral roll closes
25 August	Public notice of candidates
17–22 September	Voting papers delivered to voters
9 October	Election Day – Voting closes at 12 noon Preliminary results released
11–20 October	Official results released
1 November onwards	New officials sworn in

== Background ==
=== Representation changes ===
==== Auckland ====
This was the first time elections were held for the new Auckland Council, and the 2010 Auckland mayoral election took place concurrently.

==== Canterbury ====
The 2010 elections did not include Canterbury Regional Council. In March 2010, the National Government passed special legislation deferring Canterbury Regional Council's election until 2013 and replacing the existing councillors with appointed commissioners.

==== Southern District Health Board ====
The 2010 elections were the first for the Southern District Health Board, which was formed from the merger of the Otago and Southland DHBs on 1 May 2010. The Southern DHB had 14 members from the two former boards, but was reduced to the standard seven elected members after the election.

== Elections ==
=== Regional councils ===
The regional level of government in New Zealand is organised into areas controlled by regional councils.

Council	Electoral System	Seats	Councillors		Turnout	Details	Sources
Council	Electoral System	Seats	2007	Result	Turnout	Details	Sources
Northland	FPP	8	8 Independents	6 Independents; 2 Go Northland	51,042 (49.2%)		
Waikato	FPP	12	6 Rates Control Team; 6 Independents	10 Independents; 2 Rates Control Team	105,009 (38.5%)		
Bay of Plenty	FPP	13	13 missing info	13 Independents	83,318 (44.9%)		
Hawke's Bay	FPP	9	9 Independents	9 Independents	49,095 (45.1%)		
Taranaki	FPP	11	11 Independents	11 Independents	30,466 (39.4%)		
Manawatu-Wanganui	FPP	12	12 Independents	12 Independents	76,885 (49.3%)		
Wellington	FPP	13	12 missing info; 1 Green	11 Independents; 1 Green; 1 Labour	143,098 (42.6%)		
West Coast	FPP	7	6 Independents; 1 Change Now	7 Independents	12,294 (53.3%)		
Otago	FPP	11	11 Independents	Independents 11	63,099 (44.0%)		
Southland	FPP	12	12 Independents	12 Independents	34,690 (51.6%)		
10 of 11 councils		108					

=== Territorial authorities ===
The city and district level of government in New Zealand is organised into areas controlled by territorial authorities. Some of these also have the powers of regional governments and are known as unitary authorities. The Chatham Islands have their own specially legislated form of government.

=== Mayors ===
All territorial authorities (including the unitary authorities) directly elected mayors.

Territorial authority	Incumbent	Elected	Runner-up	Details	Sources
Far North	Wayne Brown (Ind)		John Goulter (Ind)		
Whangarei	Stan Semenoff (Ind)	Morris Cutforth (Ind)	Stan Semenoff (Ind)		
Kaipara	Neil Tiller (Ind)		Bill Guest (Ind)		
Auckland	(Ind)	Len Brown (Ind)	John Banks (Ind)		
Thames-Coromandel	Phillipa Barriball (Ind)	Glenn Leach (Ind)	Phillipa Barriball (Ind)		
Hauraki	John Tregidga (Ind)		unopposed		
Waikato	Peter Harris (Ind)	Allan Samson (Ind)	Clint Baddeley (Ind)		
Matamata-Piako	Hugh Vercoe (Ind)		Ken Mahon (Ind)		
Hamilton	Bob Simcock (Ind)	Julie Hardaker (Ind)	Bob Simcock (Ind)		
Waipa	Alan Livingston (Ind)		Peter Lee (Ind)		
Otorohanga	Dale Williams (Ind)		unopposed		
South Waikato	Neil Sinclair (Ind)		Johnny Dryden (Ind)		
Waitomo	Mark Ammon (Ind)	Brian Hanna (Ind)	Mark Ammon (Ind)		
Taupō	Clayton Stent (Ind)		Mark Burton (Ind)		
Western Bay of Plenty	Graeme Weld (Ind)		unopposed		
Tauranga	Stuart Crosby (Ind)		Murray Guy (Ind)		
Rotorua	Kevin Winters (Ind)		Charles Sturt (Ind)		
Whakatane	Colin Holmes (Ind)	Tony Bonne (Ind)	Judy Turner (Ind)		
Kawerau	Malcolm Campbell (Ind)		Matai Bennett (Ind)		
Opotiki	John Forbes (Ind)		Barry Howe (Ind)		
Gisborne	Meng Foon (Ind)		Gary Hope (Ind)		
Wairoa	Les Probert (Ind)		Denys Caves (Ind)		
Hastings	Lawrence Yule (Ind)		Simon Nixon (Ind)		
Napier	Barbara Arnott (Ind)		Michelle Pyke (Ind)		
Central Hawke's Bay	Trish Giddens (Ind)	Peter Butler (Ind)	Trish Giddens (Ind)		
New Plymouth	Peter Tennent (Ind)	Harry Duynhoven (Ind)	Pauline Lockett (Ind)		
Stratford	Neil Volzke (Ind)		unopposed		
South Taranaki	Ross Dunlop (Ind)		Liz Lambert (Ind)		
Ruapehu	Sue Morris (Ind)		unopposed		
Wanganui	Michael Laws (Ind)	Annette Main (Ind)	Dot McKinnon (Ind)		
Rangitikei	Chalky Leary (Ind)		unopposed		
Manawatu	Ian McKelvie (Ind)		Steve Gibson (Ind)		
Palmerston North	Jono Naylor (Ind)		Mark Bell-Booth (Ind)		
Tararua	Maureen Reynolds (Ind)	Roly Ellis (Ind)	David Lea (Ind)		
Horowhenua	Brendan Duffy (Ind)		Anne Hunt (Ind)		
Kapiti Coast	Jenny Rowan (Ind)		Chris Turver (Ind)		
Porirua	Jenny Brash (Ind)	Nick Leggett (Ind)	Litea Ah Hoi (Ind)		
Upper Hutt	Wayne Guppy (Ind)		Adrian Sparrow (Ind)		
Lower Hutt	David Ogden (Ind)	Ray Wallace (Ind)	David Ogden (Ind)	Details	
Wellington	Kerry Prendergast (Ind)	Celia Wade-Brown (Ind)	Kerry Prendergast (Ind)	Details	
Masterton	Gary Daniell (Ind)		David Holmes (Ind)		
Carterton	Gary McPhee (Ind)	Ron Mark (Ind)	Ruth Carter (Ind)		
South Wairarapa	Adrienne Staples (Ind)		Bob Petelin (Ind)		
Tasman	Richard Kempthorne (Ind)		Ted O'Regan (Ind)		
Nelson	Kerry Marshall (Ind)	Aldo Miccio (Ind)	Rachel Reese (Ind)		
Marlborough	Alistair Sowman (Ind)		Jamie Arbuckle (Ind)		x
Buller	Pat McManus (Ind)		Pat O'Dea (Ind)		
Grey	Tony Kokshoorn (Ind)		unopposed		
Westland	Maureen Pugh (Ind)		Peter Davidson (Ind)		
Kaikoura	Kevin Heays (Ind)	Winston Gray (Ind)	Stephan Rattray (Ind)		
Hurunui	Brendan Duffy (Ind)	Winton Dalley (Ind)	Alex Cooke (Ind)		
Waimakariri	Ron Keating (Ind)	David Ayers (Ind)	Ron Keating (Ind)		
Christchurch	Bob Parker (Ind)		Jim Anderton (Ind)	Details	
Selwyn	Kevin Coe (Ind)		Bill Woods (Ind)		
Ashburton	Bede O'Malley (Ind)	Angus McKay (Ind)	Bede O'Malley (Ind)		
Timaru	Janie Annear (Ind)		Jane Coughlan (Ind)		
Mackenzie	Joel O'Neill (Ind)	Claire Barlow (Ind)	Graeme Page (Ind)		
Waimate	John Coles (Ind)		unopposed		
Waitaki	Alex Familton (Ind)		Gary Kircher (Ind)		
Central Otago	Malcolm MacPherson (Ind)	Tony Lepper (Ind)	Jeff Hill (Ind)		
Queenstown-Lakes	Cleve Geddes (Ind)	Vanessa van Uden (Ind)	Simon Hayes (Ind)		
Dunedin	Peter Chin (Ind)	Dave Cull (Ind)	Peter Chin (Ind)	Details	
Clutha	Juno Hayes (Ind)	Bryan Cadogan (Ind)	Juno Hayes (Ind)		
Southland	Frana Cardno (Ind)		Roderick Young (Ind)		
Gore	Tracy Hicks (Ind)		unopposed		
Invercargill	Tim Shadbolt (Ind)		Suzanne Prentice (Ind)	Details	
Chatham Islands	Patrick Smith (Ind)	Alfred Preece (Ind)	Joseph Tapara (Ind)		

== Analysis ==
=== Leftward shift ===
There was a notable leftward shift in the local elections throughout the country and many notable long term centre-right mayors were replaced by left-wing mayors throughout the country.

In the new position of Auckland super-mayor, Manukau City mayor Len Brown (a Labour party politician) replaced centre-right Auckland City mayor John Banks.

In Wellington, Green Party candidate Celia Wade-Brown replaced right leaning, Kerry Prendergast.

New left-wing mayors replaced retiring incumbents in Wanganui and New Plymouth and incumbent mayors like that of Janie Annear in Timaru defeated conservative challengers.

== See also ==
- Elections in New Zealand
- 2004 New Zealand local elections
- 2007 New Zealand local elections
