= 2010 Lower Hutt mayoral election =

| ← 2007 | 9 October 2010 | 2013 → |
- Turnout: 28,139 (40.10%)
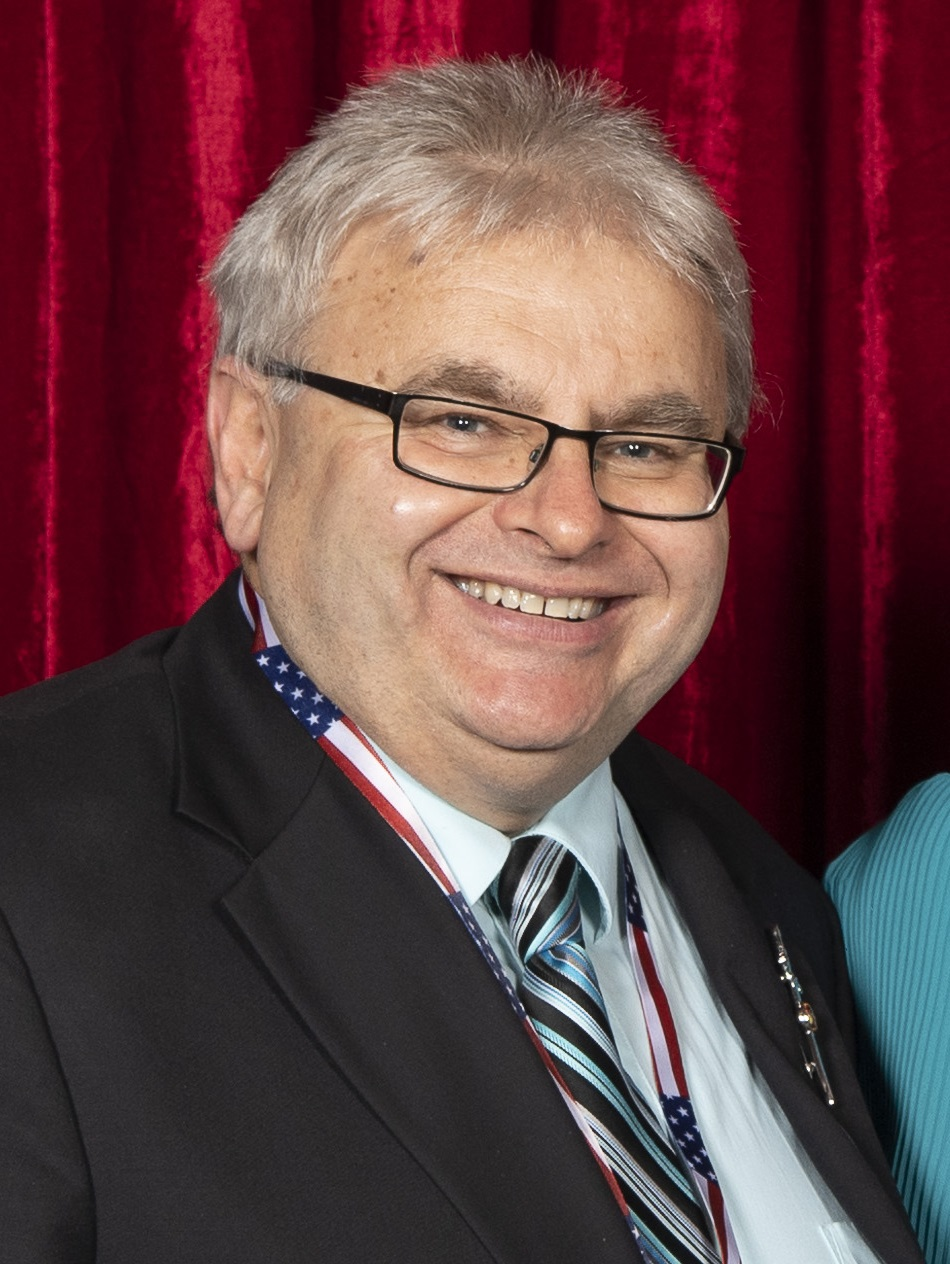

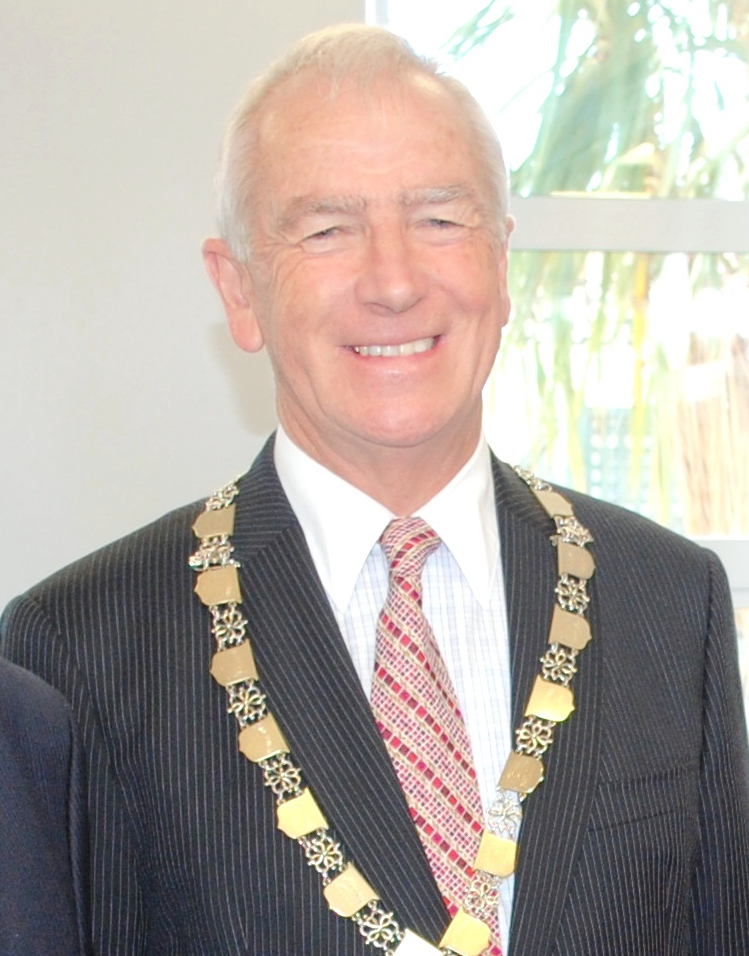
| Candidate | Ray Wallace | David Ogden |
| Party | Independent | Independent |
| Popular vote | 16,336 | 11,023 |
| Percentage | 58.05 | 39.17 |
Mayor before election
David Ogden
Elected mayor
Ray Wallace

The 2010 Lower Hutt mayoral election was part of the wider 2010 New Zealand local elections. The elections were held for the role of mayor of Lower Hutt plus other local government positions including twelve city councillors, also elected triennially. The polling was conducted using the standard first-past-the-post electoral method.

== Background ==
The incumbent mayor, David Ogden, stood for a third term. He was opposed by councillor Ray Wallace.

== Mayoral results ==
The following table gives the election results:

2010 Lower Hutt mayoral election
| Party | Candidate | Votes | % | ±% |
|---|---|---|---|---|
| Independent | Ray Wallace | 16,336 | 58.05 | +32.08 |
| Independent | David Ogden | 11,023 | 39.17 | +12.38 |
| Informal votes | | 780 | 2.77 | +0.93 |
| Majority | | 5,313 | 18.88 | |
| Turnout | | 28,139 | 40.10 | −1.00 |

== Ward results ==
Twelve candidates were also elected from wards to the Hutt City Council.

| Party/ticket | Councillors |
|---|---|
| Independent | 10 |
| City Vision | 2 |
