= 2019 Lower Hutt mayoral election =

2019 mayoral elections in Lower Hutt, New Zealand

← 2016	12 October 2019	2022 →
- Turnout: 31,355 (43.00%)
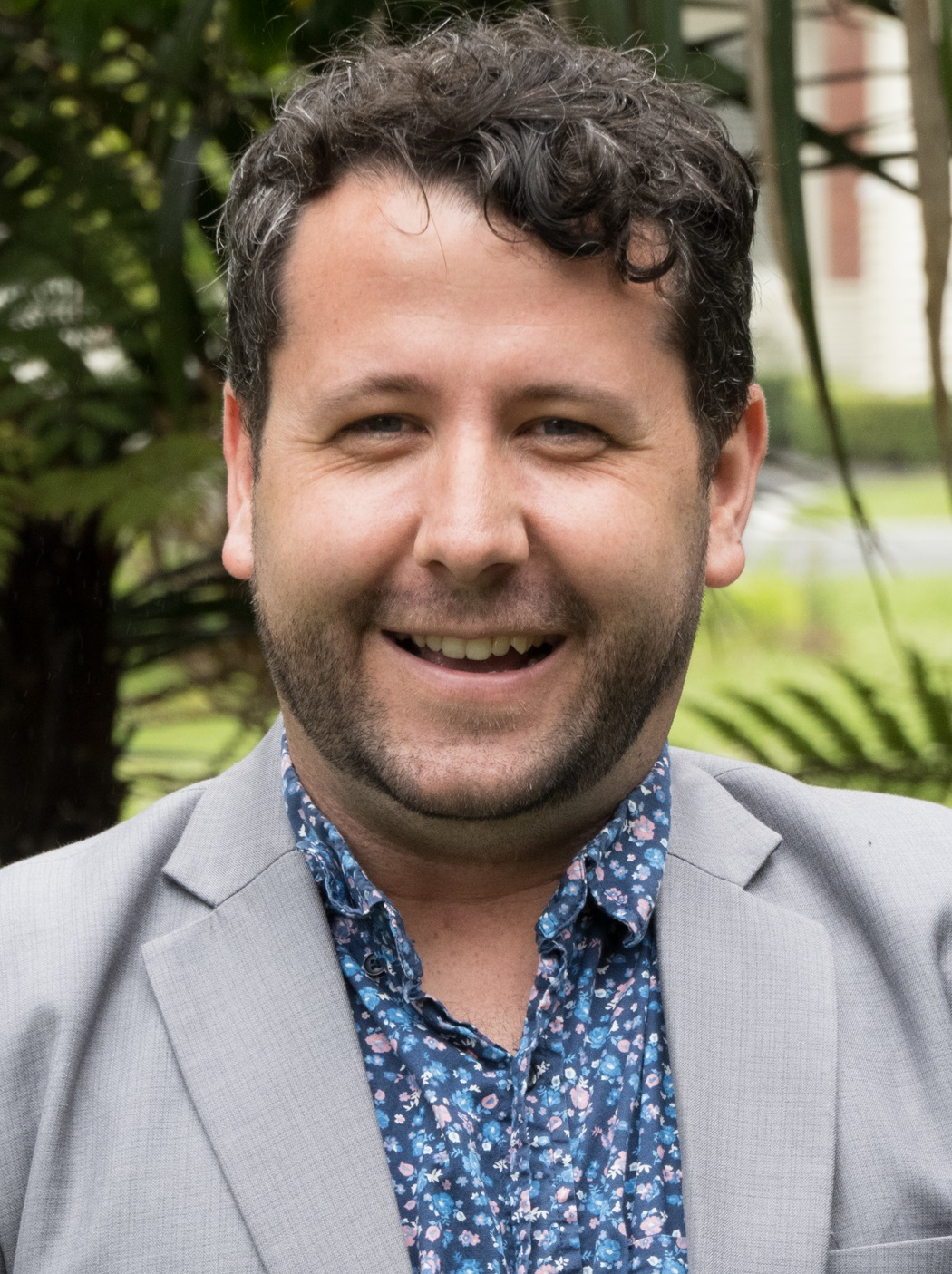

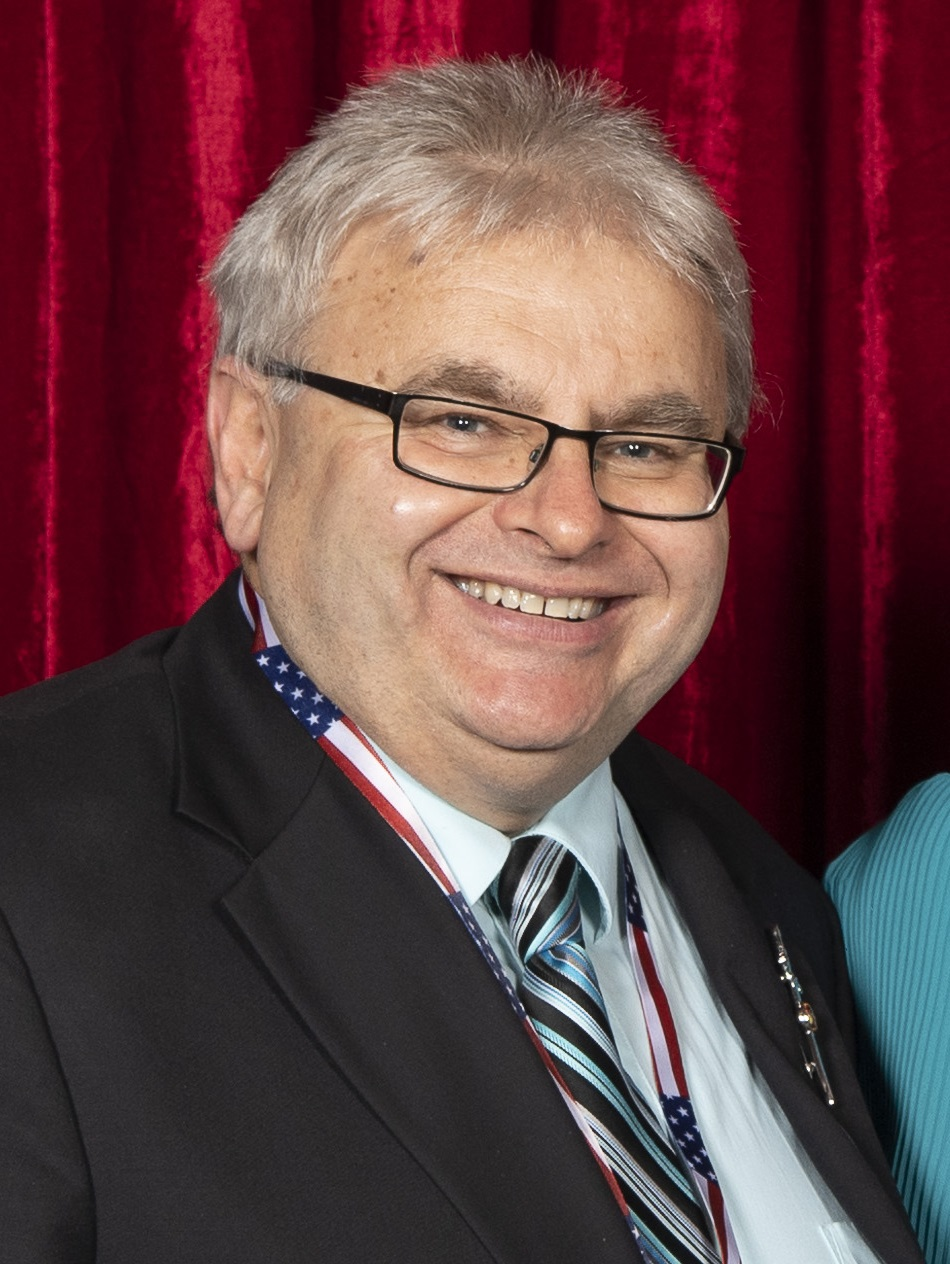
Candidate	Campbell Barry	Ray Wallace
Party	Labour	Independent
Popular vote	15,453	13,034
Percentage	49.28	41.56
Mayor before election
Ray Wallace
Elected mayor
Campbell Barry

The 2019 Lower Hutt mayoral election was part of the wider 2019 New Zealand local elections. The elections were held for the role of Mayor of Lower Hutt plus other local government positions including twelve city councillors, also elected triennially. The polling was conducted using the standard first-past-the-post electoral method.

== Background ==
The incumbent mayor, Ray Wallace, stood for a fourth term. He faced a challenge from project manager James Anderson, Wainuiomata Ward councillor Campbell Barry who stood for the Labour Party, financial advisor George MacKay and cleaning business owner David Smith.

== Mayoral results ==
2019 Lower Hutt mayoral election
Party	Candidate	Votes	%	±%
Labour	Campbell Barry	15,453	49.28	
Independent	Ray Wallace	13,034	41.56	−37.47
Independent	James Anderson	1,525	4.86	−2.53
Independent	George MacKay	785	2.50	
Independent	David Smith	501	1.59	−0.92
Informal votes		57	0.18	−0.10
Majority		2,419	7.71	
Turnout		31,355	43.00	+5.16

== Ward results ==
Twelve candidates were also elected from wards to the Hutt City Council.

Party/ticket	Councillors
Independent	11
Labour	1
