= 1998 Hutt City Council election =

Local elections in New Zealand

- 10 October 1998
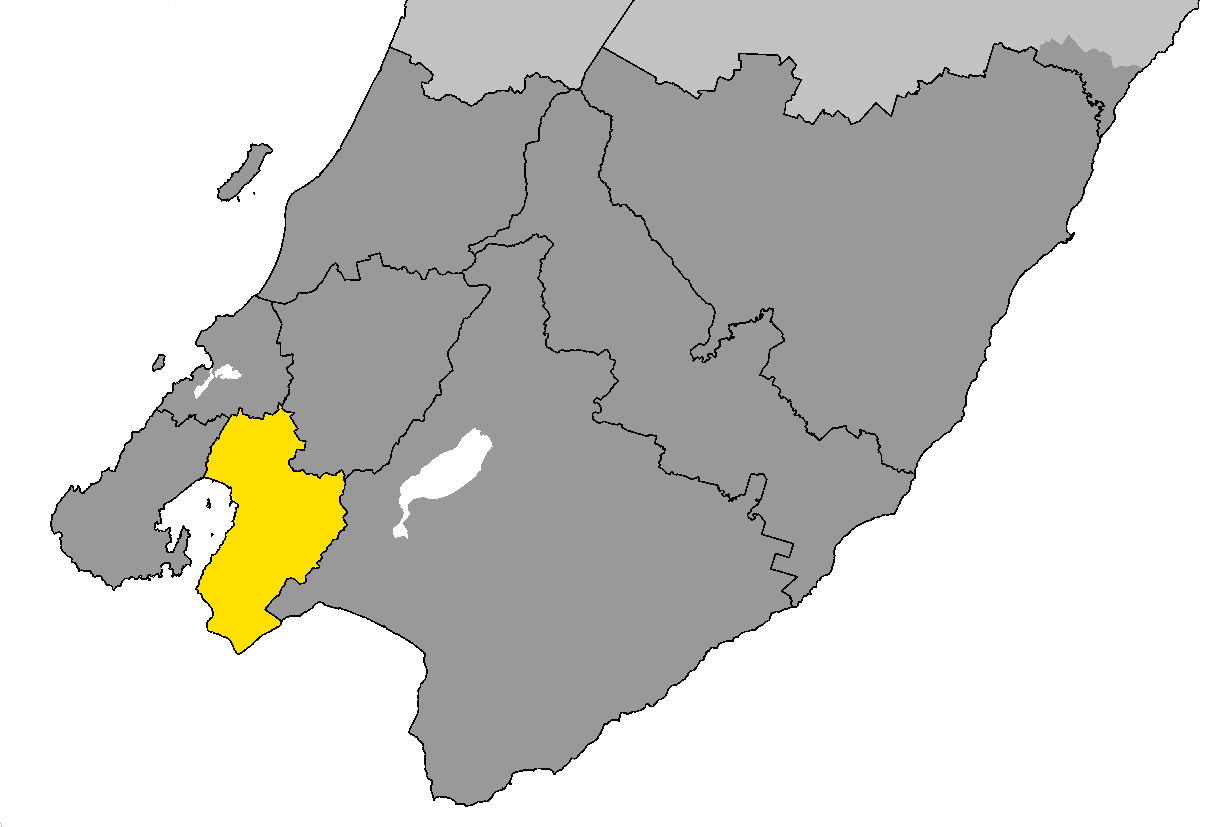
- Position of Lower Hutt within the Wellington Region

The 1998 Hutt City Council election was part of the 1998 New Zealand local elections, to elect members to sub-national councils and boards. The Hutt City elections covered one regional council (the Wellington Regional Council), city council and various local boards and licensing trusts. The polling was conducted using the standard first-past-the-post electoral method.

== Hutt City Council ==
=== Mayor ===
1998 Lower Hutt mayoral election
Party	Candidate	Votes	%	±%
Independent	John Terris	17,034	55.37	+21.76
Positive Focus	Peter Glensor	7,372	23.96	+3.78
Independent	Sandra Greig	5,715	18.57	
Informal votes		638	2.07	−0.54
Majority		9,662	31.41	+17.98
Turnout		30,759	46.93	+2.43

=== Central Ward ===
The Central Ward elected two members to the Hutt City Council

Central Ward
Party	Candidate	Votes	%	±%
City Vision	John Austad	2,881	47.18	
City Vision	Glenda Barratt	2,473	40.50	
Positive Focus	Peter Glensor	2,071	33.91	+4.56
Independent	Lawrie Woodley	1,455	23.82	−7.83
Positive Focus	Margaret Werry	1,371	22.45	
Independent	Noeline Matthews	1,230	20.14	
Independent	Peggy Tapp	512	8.38	
Informal votes		220	3.60	+0.64
Turnout		6,106		

=== Eastern Ward ===
The Eastern Ward elected two members to the Hutt City Council

Eastern Ward
Party	Candidate	Votes	%	±%
City Vision	Roger Styles	2,686	58.67	
Positive Focus	Scott Dalziell	1,911	41.74	+7.55
Independent	Joan Monrad	1,556	33.98	−7.40
Independent	Bill East	1,273	27.80	
Positive Focus	Bill Werry	889	19.41	
Independent	Nick Ursin	691	15.09	−5.98
Informal votes		150	3.27	−2.09
Turnout		4,578		

=== Harbour Ward ===
The Harbour Ward elected two members to the Hutt City Council

Harbour Ward
Party	Candidate	Votes	%	±%
Independent	Ross Jamieson	2,409	45.85	+2.63
Independent	Joy Baird	2,224	42.32	+2.12
Positive Focus	Vera Ellen	1,528	29.08	
Positive Focus	Warwick Johnston	1,320	25.12	
City Vision	Jacinth Webster	1,262	24.01	
Independent	Barbara Branch	867	16.50	
Independent	John Bhula	752	14.31	
Informal votes		147	2.79	−1.93
Turnout		5,254		

=== Northern Ward ===
The Northern Ward elected two members to the Hutt City Council

Northern Ward
Party	Candidate	Votes	%	±%
City Vision	Angus Finlayson	2,045	49.80	+16.36
Independent	Pat Brosnan	1,926	46.90	+7.30
Positive Focus	Julie Englebretsen	1,573	38.30	
Positive Focus	Ben Awa	1,009	24.57	
Independent	Brian Ashcroft	650	15.83	
Independent	Eddie Marino	485	11.81	
Independent	Ester Laban-Alama	446	10.86	
Informal votes		78	1.89	−0.18
Turnout		4,106		

=== Wainuiomata Ward ===
The Wainuiomata Ward elected three members to the Hutt City Council

Wainuiomata Ward
Party	Candidate	Votes	%	±%
Independent	Ray Wallace	3,771	77.13	+8.03
Independent	Cathie Eady	2,081	42.56	−0.45
City Vision	Julie Sylvester	1,377	28.16	
Independent	Reg Moore	1,257	25.71	−2.12
Independent	Shar Moore	1,097	22.43	
Informal votes		195	3.98	+1.68
Turnout		4,889		

=== Western Ward ===
The Western Ward elected two members to the Hutt City Council

Western Ward
Party	Candidate	Votes	%	±%
Independent	Margaret Cousins	1,847	53.16	+5.25
City Vision	David Ogden	1,521	43.78	
Independent	Sandra Greig	1,319	37.96	
Independent	Graeme Ross	1,097	31.57	−0.88
Positive Focus	Ken Howell	1,068	30.74	+13.17
Informal votes		96	2.76	−1.10
Turnout		3,474		

== Wellington Regional Council ==
=== Lower Hutt Ward ===
The Lower Hutt Ward elected four members to the Wellington Regional Council

Lower Hutt Ward
Party	Candidate	Votes	%	±%
City Vision	Rosemarie Thomas	14,905	60.30	
Independent	Jim Allen	14,358	58.09	
Positive Focus	Dick Werry	13,198	53.40	+11.66
Positive Focus	Maureen Burgess	12,704	51.40	+14.17
Independent	Teri Puketapu	10,367	41.94	
Independent	Irvine Yardley	8,609	34.83	−18.87
Turnout		24,714	37.70	
