= 2004 Hutt City Council election =

Local elections in New Zealand

- 9 October 2004
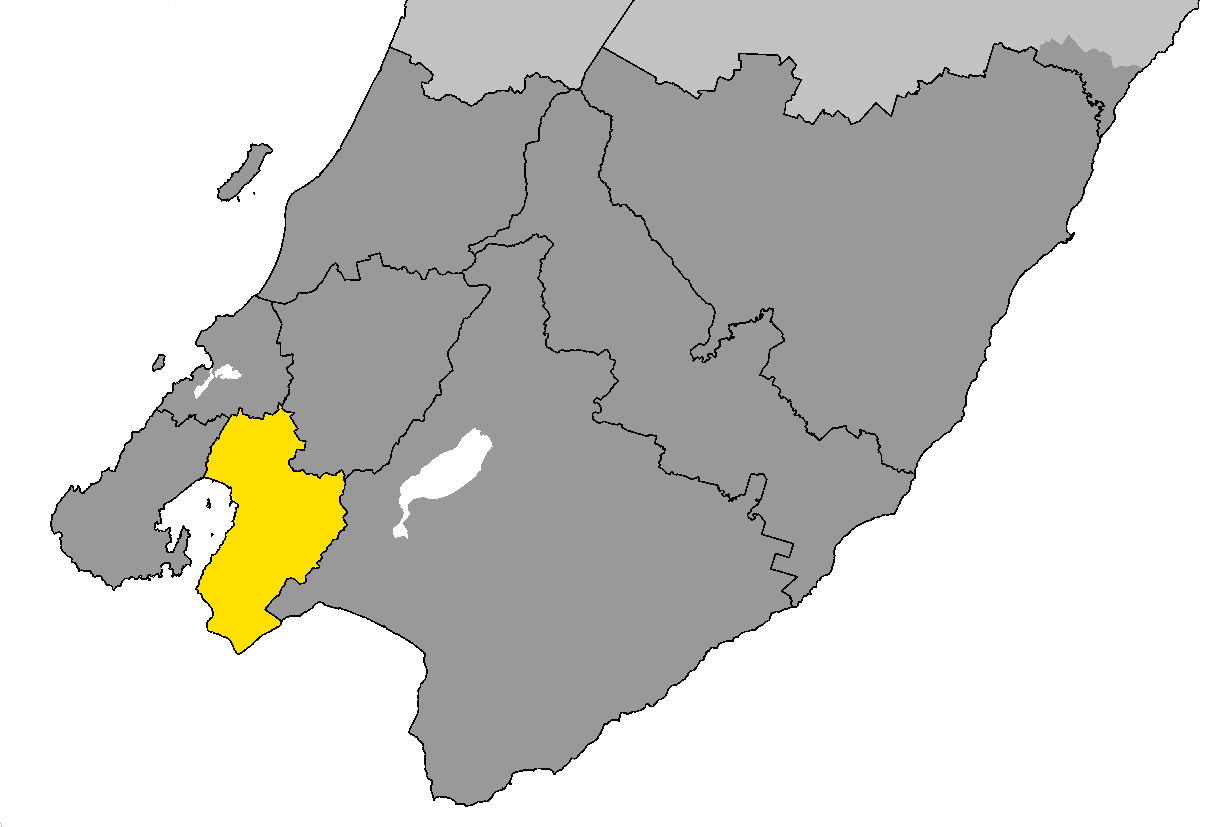
- Position of Hutt City within Wellington Region

The 2004 Hutt City Council election was part of the 2004 New Zealand local elections, to elect members to sub-national councils and boards. Members were elected to the city council, district health board and various local boards and licensing trusts. The polling was conducted using the standard first-past-the-post electoral method.

== Council ==
=== Mayor ===
2004 Lower Hutt mayoral election
Party	Candidate	Votes	%	±%
Independent	David Ogden	10,272	41.52	
Independent	John Terris	8,409	33.99	−23.22
Hutt 2020 - Labour	Scott Dalziel	3,718	15.03	−22.84
Independent	Stu Carlson	2,254	9.11	
Informal votes		83	0.33	−4.58
Majority		1,863	7.53	
Turnout		24,736	37.00	−8.76
Registered electors		66,850		

=== Central Ward ===
The Central Ward elected two members to the Hutt City Council

Central Ward
Party	Candidate	Votes	%	±%
City Vision	Chris Milne	2,929	57.71	
Independent	Deborah Hislop	1,972	38.85	
City Vision	John Austad	1,834	36.13	−18.38
Independent	Mike Rumble	1,773	34.93	
Hutt 2020 – Labour	Stephen Lulich	1,593	31.38	
Informal votes		49	0.96	−3.13
Turnout		5,075	37.69	−6.33
Registered electors		13,462		

=== Eastern Ward ===
The Eastern Ward elected two members to the Hutt City Council

Eastern Ward
Party	Candidate	Votes	%	±%
City Vision	Roger Styles	2,364	59.14	+3.54
Independent	David Ogden (Note: As Ogden won the Mayoralty his election to the council was voided and his seat was awarded to the highest polling unsuccessful candidate.)	1,845	46.15	
Independent	Glenda Barratt	1,235	30.89	
Hutt 2020 – Labour	Lisa Bridson	1,058	26.46	
Independent	Teri Puketapu	796	19.91	−19.72
Independent	Jim Short	631	15.78	+4.17
Informal votes		65	1.62	−0.37
Turnout		3,997	35.31	−8.62
Registered electors		11,319		

Table footnotes:

=== Harbour Ward ===
The Harbour Ward elected two members to the Hutt City Council

Harbour Ward
Party	Candidate	Votes	%	±%
Independent	Joy Baird	2,706	61.50	+15.22
Independent	Ross Jamieson	2,640	60.00	+6.31
Independent	Neil Newman	1,205	27.38	
Hutt 2020 – Labour	Clive Haley	883	20.06	
Hutt 2020 – Labour	Dave Stonyer	852	19.36	
Independent	Lawry Sutherland	498	11.31	
Informal votes		16	0.36	−2.47
Turnout		4,400	35.18	−6.55
Registered electors		12,505		

=== Northern Ward ===
The Northern Ward elected two members to the Hutt City Council

Northern Ward
Party	Candidate	Votes	%	±%
Hutt 2020 – Labour	Julie Englebretsen	1,739	55.55	+4.99
City Vision	Angus Finlayson	1,650	52.71	−3.20
Independent	Fred Allen	1,386	44.28	
Hutt 2020 – Labour	Mena Malu Aokuso	736	23.51	
Independent	Athol John Greentree	725	23.16	
Informal votes		24	0.76	−1.40
Turnout		3,130	32.38	−10.49
Registered electors		9,664		

=== Wainuiomata Ward ===
The Wainuiomata Ward elected two members to the Hutt City Council

Wainuiomata Ward
Party	Candidate	Votes	%	±%
Independent	Ray Wallace	3,426	93.68	+17.69
Independent	Tracey Pollard	2,183	59.69	+31.92
Independent	Julie Sylvester	1,701	46.51	+8.23
Informal votes		4	0.10	−2.28
Turnout		3,657	33.04	−10.29
Registered electors		11,067		

=== Western Ward ===
The Western Ward elected one member to the Hutt City Council

Western Ward
Party	Candidate	Votes	%	±%
Independent	Margaret Cousins	1,580	48.66	−7.57
City Vision	Kathryn McGavin	1,054	32.46	−9.02
Independent	Andrew Fox	600	18.47	
Informal votes		13	0.40	−1.87
Turnout		3,247	36.75	−8.20
Registered electors		8,833		

== Other local elections ==
=== Wellington Regional Council - Lower Hutt Ward ===
The Lower Hutt Ward elected three members to the Wellington Regional Council

Lower Hutt Ward
Party	Candidate	Votes	%	±%
Independent	Glen Evans	11,711	53.75	+16.26
Hutt 2020 – Labour	Peter Glensor	10,738	49.28	+15.53
Independent	Sandra Greig	10,489	48.14	+19.95
Hutt 2020 – Labour	Dick Werry	8,626	39.59	−0.38
City Vision	Rosemarie Thomas	8,533	39.16	−2.53
Independent	Maurie Bognuda	8,248	37.85	
Hutt 2020 – Labour	Steve Ritchie	6,990	32.08	
Informal votes		27	0.12	
Turnout		21,787	32.59	−7.25
Registered electors		66,850		
