= 2019 New Zealand local elections =

Local elections in New Zealand

- 12 October 2019
- 77 of 78 councils
Party	Councils	+/–
missing info		
This lists parties that won seats. See the complete results below.
- 67 mayors, ?? local councillors, and ?? regional councillors
Party	Seats	+/–
Mayors
missing info		
Local councillors
missing info		
Regional councillors
missing info		
This lists parties that won seats. See the complete results below.

The 2019 New Zealand local elections (Māori: Nga Pōtitanga ā-Rohe 2019) were triennial elections that were held from 20 September until 12 October 2019 to elect local mayors and councillors, regional councillors, and members of various other local government bodies.

All 11 of New Zealand's regions and all 67 cities and districts participated in the election.

== Key dates ==
Key dates relating to the local elections were as follows:

1 July 2019	Electoral Commission enrolment campaign starts.
19 July 2019	Nominations open for candidates. Rolls open for inspection at council offices and other sites locally.
16 August 2019	Nominations close at 12:00. Rolls close.
21 August 2019	Election date and candidates' names publicised by electoral officers.
20–25 September 2019	Voting documents delivered to households. Electors can post the documents back to electoral officers as soon as they have voted.
12 October 2019	Polling day — The voting documents must be at the council before voting closes at 12:00. Preliminary results will be available as soon as possible afterwards.
17–23 October 2019	Official results declared

== Elections ==
=== Regional councils ===
The regional level of government in New Zealand is organised into areas controlled by regional councils.

Council	Electoral System	Seats	Control		Turnout	Details	Sources
Council	Electoral System	Seats	Previous	Result	Turnout	Details	Sources
Northland	FPP	9	9 Unknown	9 Independents			
Waikato	FPP	14	14 Unknown	14 Independents			
Bay of Plenty	FPP	14	14 Unknown	14 Independents			
Hawke's Bay	FPP	9	9 Unknown	9 Independents			
Taranaki	FPP	11	11 Unknown	11 Independents			
Horizons (Manawatū-Whanganui)	FPP	12	12 Unknown	12 Independents			
Greater Wellington	STV	13	13 Unknown	9 Independents; 2 Green; 1 The Wellington Party; 1 Labour		Details	
West Coast	FPP	7	7 Unknown	7 Independents			
Canterbury	FPP	14	14 Unknown	10 Independents; 3 People's Choice – Labour; 1 People's Choice			
Otago	FPP	12	12 Unknown	11 Independents; 1 Labour			
Southland	FPP	12	12 Unknown	12 Independents			
All 11 councils		127					

=== Unitary authorities ===
Unitary authorities are local government entities that have the powers of both a territorial authority and those of a regional council. There are currently five unitary authorities.

The Chatham Islands have a unique, separately-legislated council that has almost all the powers of a unitary authority.

Council	Electoral System	Seats	Control		Turnout	Details	Sources
Council	Electoral System	Seats	Previous	Result	Turnout	Details	Sources
Auckland	FPP	20	20 Unknown	7 Independents and others; 4 Labour; 3 Communities & Residents; 2 City Vision; 2 Putting People First; 2 Manurewa-Papakura Action Team			
Gisborne	STV	13	13 Unknown	13 Independents			
Nelson	STV	12	12 Unknown	11 Independents; 1 Labour			
Tasman	FPP	13	13 Unknown	13 Independents		Details	
Marlborough	STV	13	13 Unknown	13 Independents			
Chatham Islands	FPP	8	8 Unknown	8 Independents			
All 6 councils		79					

=== Territorial authorities ===
The city and district level of government in New Zealand is organised into areas controlled by territorial authorities. Some of these also have the powers of regional governments and are known as unitary authorities. The Chatham Islands have their own specially legislated form of government.

Council	Electoral System	Seats	Control		Turnout	Details	Sources
Council	Electoral System	Seats	Previous	Result	Turnout	Details	Sources
Far North	STV	10	10 Unknown	10 Independents			
Whangārei	FPP	13	13 Unknown	13 Independents			
Kaipara	STV	9	9 Unknown	9 Independents			
Hauraki	FPP	13	13 Unknown	13 Independents			
Thames-Coromandel	FPP	8	8 Unknown	8 Independents			
Waikato	FPP	11	11 Unknown	11 Independents			
Matamata-Piako	FPP	11	11 Unknown	11 Independents			
Hamilton	STV	12	12 Unknown	12 Independents			
Waipā	FPP	9	9 Unknown	9 Independents			
Ōtorohanga	FPP	7	7 Unknown	7 Independents			
South Waikato	FPP	9	9 Unknown	9 Independents			
Waitomo	FPP	6	6 Unknown	6 Independents			
Taupō	FPP	11	11 Unknown	9 Independents; 2 Love Turangi			
Western Bay of Plenty	FPP	11	11 Unknown	11 Independents			
Tauranga	FPP	10	10 Unknown	10 Independents			
Rotorua Lakes	FPP	10	10 Unknown	8 Independents; 2 RDR&R			
Whakatāne	FPP	10	10 Unknown	10 Independents			
Kawerau	FPP	8	8 Unknown	8 Independents			
Ōpōtiki	FPP	6	6 Unknown	6 Independents			
Wairoa	FPP	6	6 Unknown	6 Independents			
Hastings	FPP	13	13 Unknown	12 Independents; 1 Labour			
Napier	FPP	12	12 Unknown	12 Independents			
Central Hawke's Bay	FPP	8	8 Unknown	8 Independents			
New Plymouth	STV	14	14 Unknown	14 Independents			
Stratford	FPP	10	10 Unknown	10 Independents			
South Taranaki	FPP	12	12 Unknown	12 Independents			
Ruapehu	STV	10	10 Unknown	10 Independent			
Whanganui	FPP	12	12 Unknown	12 Independent			
Rangitikei	FPP	11	11 Unknown	11 Independents			
Manawatū	FPP	10	10 Unknown	10 Independents			
Palmerston North	STV	15	15 Unknown	11 Independents; 2 Green; 2 Labour			
Tararua	FPP	8	8 Unknown	8 Independents			
Horowhenua	FPP	10	10 Unknown	10 Independents			
Kāpiti Coast	STV	10	10 Unknown	9 Independents; 1 Labour			
Porirua	STV	10	10 Unknown	7 Independents; 2 Labour; 1 Housing Action Porirua			
Upper Hutt	FPP	10	10 Unknown	10 Independents			
Hutt (Lower Hutt)	FPP	12	12 Unknown	11 Independents; 1 Labour			
Wellington	STV	15	15 Unknown	8 Independents; 3 Labour; 3 Green; 1 The Wellington Party		Details	
Masterton	FPP	10	10 Unknown	10 Independents			
Carterton	FPP	8	8 Unknown	8 Independents			
South Wairarapa	FPP	9	9 Unknown	9 Independents			
Buller	FPP	10	10 Unknown	10 Independents			
Grey	FPP	8	8 Unknown	8 Independents			
Westland	FPP	8	8 Unknown	8 Independents			
Kaikōura	FPP	7	7 Unknown	7 Independents			
Hurunui	FPP	10	10 Unknown	10 Independents			
Waimakariri	FPP	10	10 Unknown	10 Independents			
Christchurch	FPP	16	16 Unknown	6 Independents; 3 The People's Choice; 3 The People's Choice – Labour; 3 Independent Citizens; 1 Labour			
Selwyn	FPP	11	11 Unknown	11 Independents			
Ashburton	FPP	9	9 Unknown	9 Independents			
Timaru	FPP	9	9 Unknown	9 Independents			
Mackenzie	FPP	6	6 Unknown	6 Independents			
Waimate	FPP	8	8 Unknown	8 Independents			
Waitaki	FPP	10	10 Unknown	10 Independents			
Central Otago	FPP	11	11 Unknown	11 Independents			
Queenstown-Lakes	FPP	10	10 Unknown	10 Independents			
Dunedin	STV	14	14 Unknown	12 Independents; 1 Green Dunedin; 1 Labour			
Clutha	FPP	14	14 Unknown	14 Independents			
Southland	FPP	12	12 Unknown	12 Independents			
Gore	FPP	11	11 Unknown	11 Independents			
Invercargill	FPP	12	12 Unknown	11 Independents; 1 IRAG			
60 councils		625					

=== Mayors ===
All territorial authorities (including unitary authorities) directly elect mayors.

Territorial authority	Incumbent	Elected	Runner-up	Details	Sources
Far North	John Carter (Ind)		Tania McInnes (Ind)		
Whangārei	Sheryl Mai (Ind)		Tony Savage (Ind)		
Kaipara	Jason Smith (Ind)		Moemoea Mohoawhenua (Ind)		
Auckland	Phil Goff (Note: Endorsed by Labour) (Ind)		John Tamihere (Ind)	Details	
Thames-Coromandel	Sandra Goudie (Ind)		Len Salt (Ind)		
Hauraki	John Tregidga (Ind)	Toby Adams (Ind)	Josie Anderson (Ind)		
Waikato	Allan Sanson (Ind)		Korikori Hawkins (Ind)		
Matamata-Piako	Jan Barnes (Ind)	Ash Turner (Ind)	Jan Barnes (Ind)		
Hamilton	Andrew King (Ind)		Andrew King (Ind)		
Waipā	Jim Mylchreest (Ind)		unopposed		
Ōtorohanga	Max Baxter (Ind)		Leveson Gower (Ind)		
South Waikato	Jenny Shattock (Ind)		unopposed		
Waitomo	Brian Hanna (Ind)	John Robertson (Ind)	Brian Hanna (Ind)		
Taupō	David Trewavas (Ind)		Zane Cozens (Ind)		
Western Bay of Plenty	Gary Webber (Ind)		Margaret Murray-Benge (Ind)		
Tauranga	Greg Brownless (Ind)	Tenby Powell (Ind)	Greg Brownless (Ind)		
Rotorua	Steve Chadwick (Ind)		Reynold MacPherson (Ind)		
Whakatāne	Tony Bonne (Ind)	Judy Turner (Ind)	Victor Luca (Ind)		
Kawerau	Malcolm Campbell (Ind)		Tracy Hill (Ind)		
Ōpōtiki	John Forbes (Ind)	Lyn Riesterer (Ind)	Alex Dobie (Ind)		
Gisborne	Rehette Stoltz (Ind)		Meredith Akuhata-Brown (Ind)		
Wairoa	Craig Little (Ind)		Waipatu Winitana (Ind)	Details	
Hastings	Sandra Hazlehurst (Ind)		Damon Harvey (Ind)	Details	
Napier	Bill Dalton (Ind)		Chris Tremain (Ind)	Details	
Central Hawke's Bay	Alex Walker (Ind)		Darcie Scowen (Ind)	Details	
New Plymouth	Neil Holdom (Ind)		Max Brough (Ind)		
Stratford	Neil Volzke (Ind)		Graham Kelly (Ind)		
South Taranaki	Ross Dunlop (Ind)		Craig Baylis (Ind)		
Ruapehu	Don Cameron (Ind)		Jacques Windell (Ind)		
Whanganui	Hamish McDouall (Ind)		unopposed		
Rangitikei	Andy Watson (Ind)		unopposed		
Manawatū	Helen Worboys (Ind)		James Harold (Ind)		
Palmerston North	Grant Smith (Ind)		Teanau Tuiono (Ind)		
Tararua	Tracey Collis (Ind)		James Harold (Ind)		
Horowhenua	Michael Feyen (Ind)		Victoria Kaye-Simmons (Ind)		
Kāpiti Coast	K Gurunathan (Ind)		Gwynn Compton (Ind)	Details	
Porirua	Mike Tana (Ind)	Anita Baker (Ind)	Mike Tana (Ind)	Details	
Upper Hutt	Wayne Guppy (Ind)		Angela McLeod (Ind)	Details	
Lower Hutt	Ray Wallace (Ind)	Campbell Barry (Ind)	Ray Wallace (Ind)	Details	
Wellington	Justin Lester (Ind)	Andy Foster (Ind)	Justin Lester (Ind)	Details	
Masterton	Lyn Patterson (Ind)		Tina Nixon (Ind)	Details	
Carterton	John Booth (Ind)	Greg Lang (Ind)	Jill Greathead (Ind)	Details	
South Wairarapa	Viv Napier (Ind)	Alex Beijen (Ind)	Viv Napier (Ind)	Details	
Tasman	Richard Kempthorne (Ind)	Tim King (Ind)	Brent Maru (Ind)		
Nelson	Rachel Reese (Ind)		Mel Courtney (Ind)		
Marlborough, New Zealand	John Leggett (Ind)		Jamie Arbuckle (Ind)		
Buller	Gary Howard (Ind)	Jamie Cleine (Ind)	Pat O'Dea (Ind)		
Grey	Tony Kokshoorn (Ind)		Cliff Sandrey (Ind)		
Westland	Bruce Smith (Ind)		Latham Martin (Ind)		
Kaikōura	Winston Gray (Ind)	Craig Mackle (Ind)	John Diver (Ind)		
Hurunui	Winton Dalley (Ind)		unopposed		
Waimakariri	David Ayers (Ind)	Dan Gordon (Ind)	Paul Williams (Ind)		
Christchurch	Lianne Dalziel (Ind)		Darryll Park (Ind)	Details	
Selwyn	Sam Broughton (Ind)		Bill Woods (Ind)		
Ashburton	Donna Favel (Ind)	Neil Brown (Ind)	Tony Todd (Ind)		
Timaru	Damon Odey (Ind)	Nigel Bowen (Ind)	Gordon Handy (Ind)		
Mackenzie	Graham Smith (Ind)		Julian Lee (Ind)		
Waimate	Craig Rowley (Ind)		Murray Ludemann (Ind)		
Chatham Islands	Alfred Preece (Ind)	Monique Croon (Ind)	Greg Horler (Ind)		
Waitaki	Gary Kircher (Ind)		Katrina Hazelhurst (Ind)		
Central Otago	Tim Cadogan (Ind)		Victoria Bonham (Ind)		
Queenstown-Lakes	Jim Boult (Ind)		Nick Kiddle (Ind)		
Dunedin	Dave Cull (Ind)	Aaron Hawkins (Ind)	Lee Vandervis (Ind)	Details	
Clutha	Bryan Cadogan (Ind)		unopposed		
Southland	Gary Tong (Ind)		Don Byars (Ind)		
Gore	Tracy Hicks (Ind)		unopposed		
Invercargill	Tim Shadbolt (Ind)		Darren Ludlow (Ind)	Details	

=== Community boards ===
Elections were also held for community boards, which have been set up by several of the territorial authorities under Part 4 of the Local Government Act 2002 to represent the interests of particular communities within those territories.

=== District health boards ===
Elections were also held for District health boards (DHBs). These were the last elections held for the DHBs before they were disestablished on 1 July 2022 and replaced by Te Whatu Ora.

=== Licensing trusts ===
Elections were also be held for licensing trusts, which are community-owned companies with government-authorised monopolies on the development of premises licensed for the sale of alcoholic beverages and associated accommodation in an area.

== Analysis ==
=== Mayoral election results ===
In Auckland, Phil Goff was re-elected Mayor and at least 16 of the city's 20 councillors retained their seats, with two new councillors winning seats which were vacated by retirement. In Hamilton, incumbent mayor Andrew King lost to Paula Southgate, who previously challenged him in 2016, while four controversial councillors were voted out of office. In Wellington incumbent mayor Justin Lester was unseated by Andy Foster, who received a high-profile endorsement from filmmaker Sir Peter Jackson. The election also marked the first time a Green Party member was elected to serve as a mayor in New Zealand, with Aaron Hawkins being elected Mayor of Dunedin.

=== Low candidate numbers ===
According to The Spinoff's editor Toby Manhire, the 2019 local elections had the lowest number of candidate nominations relative to the total number of available seats. Of the 572 local body elections held that year, 101 seats and positions were not contested while 235 candidates were elected unopposed.
