= 2019 Tasman District Council election =

Local election in New Zealand

- 12 October 2019

District council election
- Turnout: 19,846 (51.68%)
- Seats: 13 Independents

Mayoral election
- Turnout: 19,846 (51.68%)
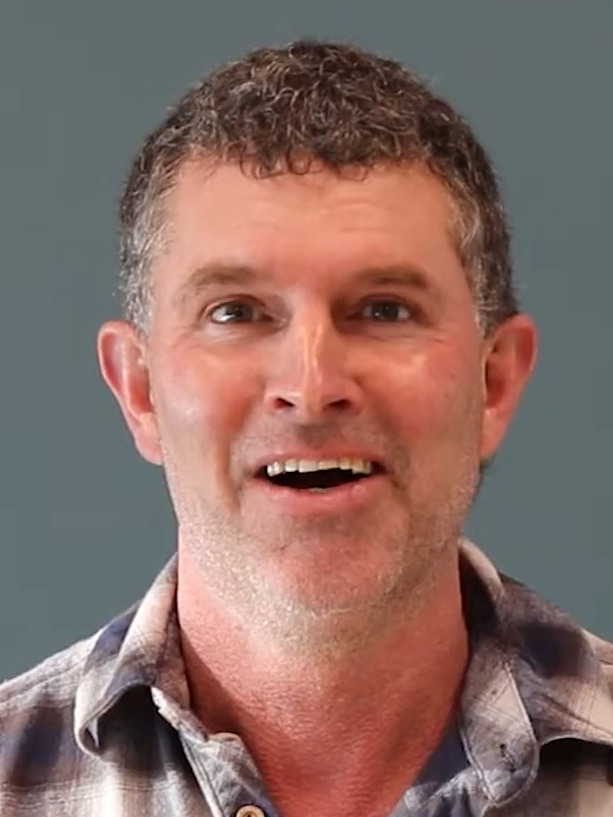

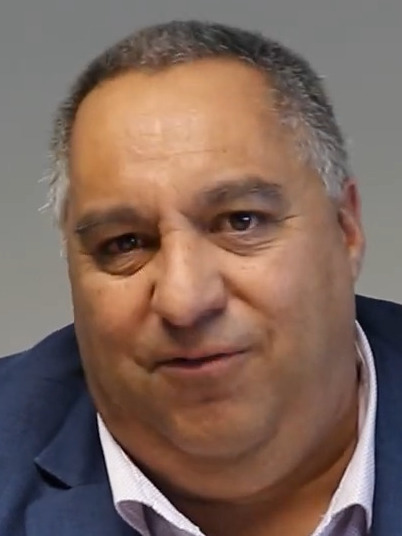

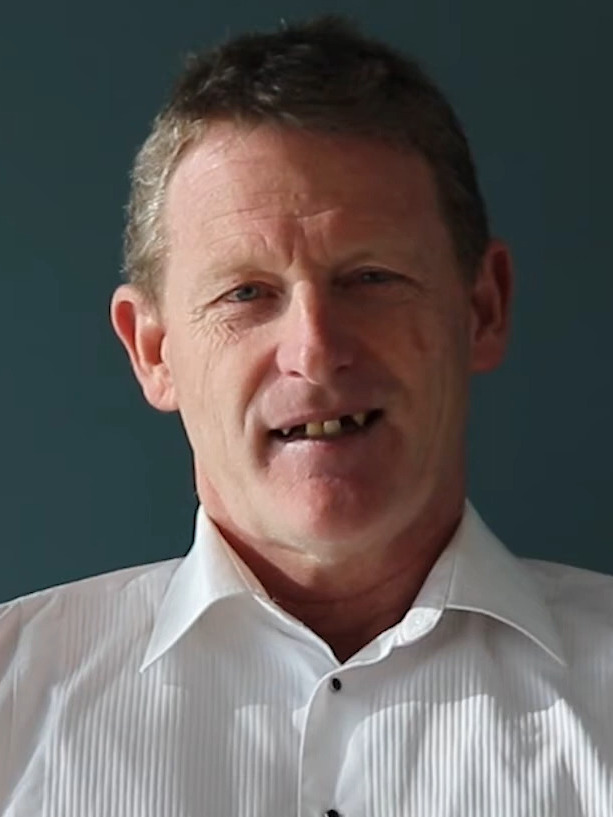

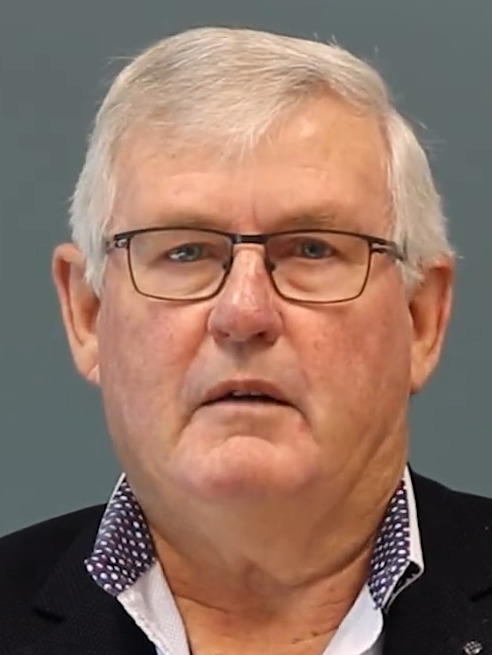
Candidate	Tim King	Brent Maru
Popular vote	8,034	5,841
Percentage	39.80	28.94
Candidate	Dean McNamara	Maxwell Clark
Popular vote	3,417	2,514
Percentage	16.93	12.45
Mayor before election
Tim King
Independent
Elected mayor
Tim King
Independent
- Vote share of elected district councillors

The 2019 Tasman District Council election was held on 12 October 2019 as part of the wider 2019 New Zealand local elections to elect members to sub-national councils and boards. One mayor and thirteen district councillors were elected in Tasman District, as well as the members of two community boards.

== Elected members ==
=== Mayor ===
The incumbent mayor, Richard Kempthorne, announced in March 2019 that he would not stand for re-election. Kempthorne had first been elected as a district councillor in the 2001 local election and after serving two terms as a councillor, he had been mayor since winning the 2007 local election. Tim King, who had been Tasman's deputy mayor since 2001 and had first been elected to Tasman District Council as a councillor in the 1998 local elections, was elected to succeed Kempthorne in the mayoralty. Brent Maru, who was the incumbent chairperson of the Motueka Community Board, came in second place. Dean McNamara came third; this was his third mayoral election. McNamara was re-elected as a Moutere-Waimea ward councillor. Maxwell Clark came fourth in the mayoral contest.

2019 Tasman mayoral election
Affiliation	Candidate	Votes	%
None	Tim King	8,034	39.80
None	Brent Maru	5,841	28.94
None	Dean McNamara	3,417	16.93
None	Maxwell Clark	2,514	12.45
Informal		25	0.12
Blank		355	1.76
Turnout		20,186	

=== Council ===
Summary of results
Ward	Incumbent	Elected
Golden Bay	Sue Brown	Chris Hill
Golden Bay	Paul Sangster	Celia Butler
Lakes–Murchison	Stuart Bryant	
Moutere–Waimea	Tim King	Christeen MacKenzie
Moutere–Waimea	Anne Turley	
Moutere–Waimea	Dean McNamara	
Motueka	David Ogilvie	
Motueka	Peter Canton	Trindi Walker
Motueka	Paul Hawkes	Claire Hutt
Richmond	Dana Wensley	
Richmond	Trevor Tuffnell	
Richmond	Kit Maling	
Richmond	Mark Greening	

==== Details ====
The two incumbents in the Golden Bay ward, Sue Brown and Paul Sangster, were both defeated. Chris Hill and Celia Butler were elected with large majorities. Sangster came third, receiving about half the votes of Hill. Brown came fifth in the contest that had six candidates.

Golden Bay ward
Affiliation	Candidate	Votes	%
None	Chris Hill	1,555	
None	Celia Butler	1,303	
None	Paul Sangster	734	
None	Kaya Blown	480	
None	Sue Brown	417	
None	Reg Turner	376	
Informal		4	
Blank		9	
Turnout			

In the Motueka ward, three councillors were elected. Preliminary results had Barry Dowler in third place, just 3 votes ahead of Claire Hutt. When the final results were released, Hutt was ahead of Dowler by 24 votes. The result created a gender balance for the first time in the history of Tasman District Council.

Motueka ward
Affiliation	Candidate	Votes	%
None	David Ogilvie	2,492	x
None	Trindi Walker	2,463	x
None	Clair Hutt	2,172	x
Independent	Barry Dowler	2,148	x
Independent	Trevor Norriss	1,940	x
Independent	Paul Dixon-Didier	1,104	x
Informal		25	x
Blank		71	x
Turnout		x	

Moutere–Waimea ward
Affiliation	Candidate	Votes	%
None	Anne Turley	2,040	x
None	Dean McNamara	2,033	x
Independent	Christeen MacKenzie	1,881	x
None	Julie Nevin	1,672	x
None	Don Everitt	1,590	x
None	Richard Johns	1,397	x
None	Elisabeth Siegmund	980	x
None	Jennifer Beatson	949	x
None	Julian Eggers	916	x
None	Hayden Stevenson	680	x
Informal		8	x
Blank		179	x
Turnout		x	

Richmond ward
Affiliation	Candidate	Votes	%
None	Dana Wensley	3,856	x
None	Kit Maling	3,464	x
None	Trevor Tuffnell	3,090	x
None	Mark Greening	2,673	x
None	Stan Holland	2,040	x
None	Maxwell Clark	2,030	x
None	Gary Watson	1,677	x
None	Peter Lynch	1,348	x
None	Maurie White	1,010	x
Informal		7	x
Blank		90	x
Turnout		x	

Lakes–Murchison ward

In the Lakes–Murchison ward, Stuart Bryant was declared elected unopposed.

=== Community boards ===
Summary of results
Board	Incumbent	Elected
Motueka	Brent Maru	
Motueka	Richard Horrell	
Motueka	Claire Hutt	David Armstrong
Motueka	Barry Dowler (Note: Elected in a February 2017 by-election)	Joni Tomsett
Golden Bay	Lynne Ensor	Averill Grant
Golden Bay	Abbie Langford	
Golden Bay	Grant Knowles	
Golden Bay	Dave Gowland	

==== Details ====
Golden Bay Community Board
Affiliation	Candidate	Votes	%
None	Averill Grant	1,616	x
None	Abbie Langford	1,560	x
None	Grant Knowles	1,470	x
None	Dave Gowland	1,316	x
None	Robert Hewison	1,283	x
None	Wendy Andrews	737	x
Informal		1	x
Blank		75	x
Turnout		x	

Motueka Community Board
Affiliation	Candidate	Votes	%
None	Brent Maru	3,916	x
None	Trindi Walker (Note: Withdrawn, elected as district councillor)	3,020	x
None	Richard Horrell	2,492	x
None	David Armstrong	2,059	x
None	Joni Tomsett	1,938	x
None	Charmaine Petereit	1,055	x
None	Jon Taylor	675	x
Informal		3	x
Blank		94	x
Turnout		x	

== Aftermath ==
During the term, Claire Hutt resigned from the council. She put a notice of her resignation onto her Facebook page on 7 February 2020, stating that "unforeseen personal family circumstances" made her resign. Nominations for the by-election closed on 16 March. Voting documents were sent out on 20 April, with 12 May set as polling day for the by-election. Seven candidates stood for election, with Barry Dowler being successful. Losing candidates were Nick Hughes, Gary Watson, Jennifer Beatson, Tania Corbett, Maxwell Clark, and Elisabeth Siegmund.

Dowler had previously joined Tasman District Council via a by-election in 2017.
