= 2007 Lower Hutt mayoral election =

Mayoral election in New Zealand

- 13 October 2007
- Turnout: 28,080 (41.10%)
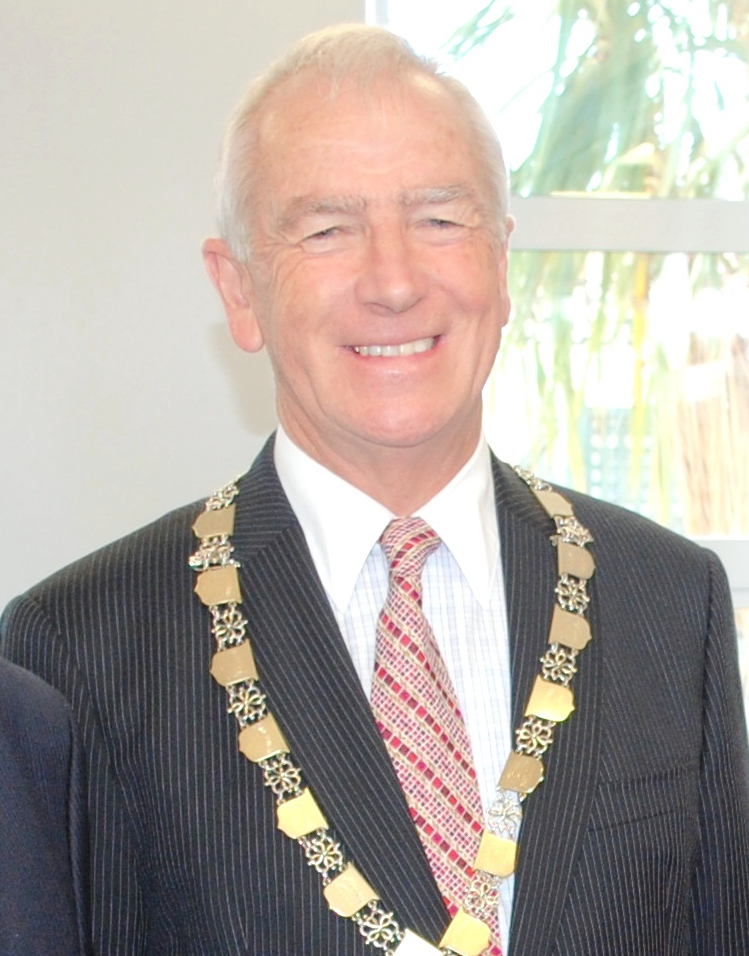

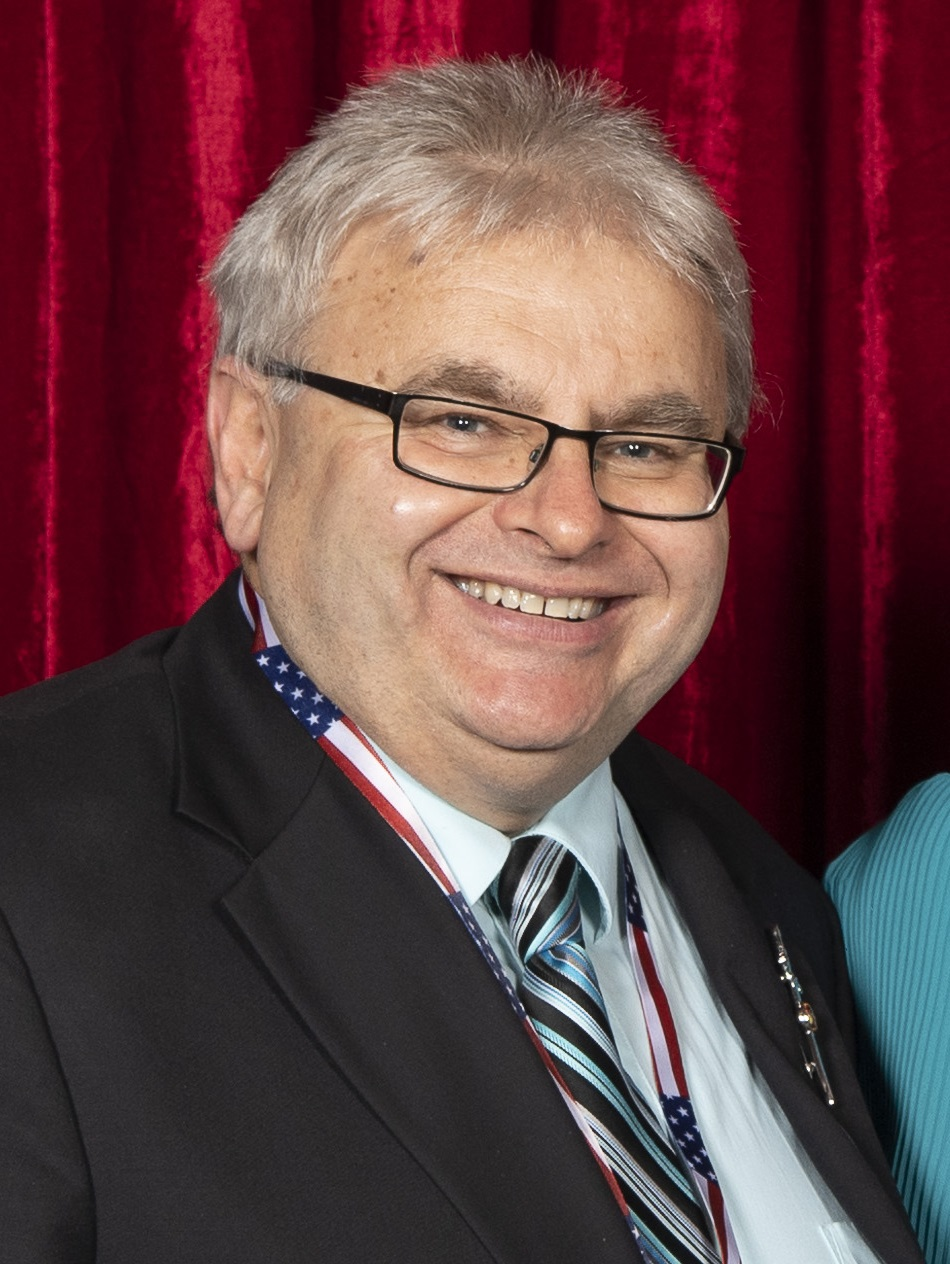

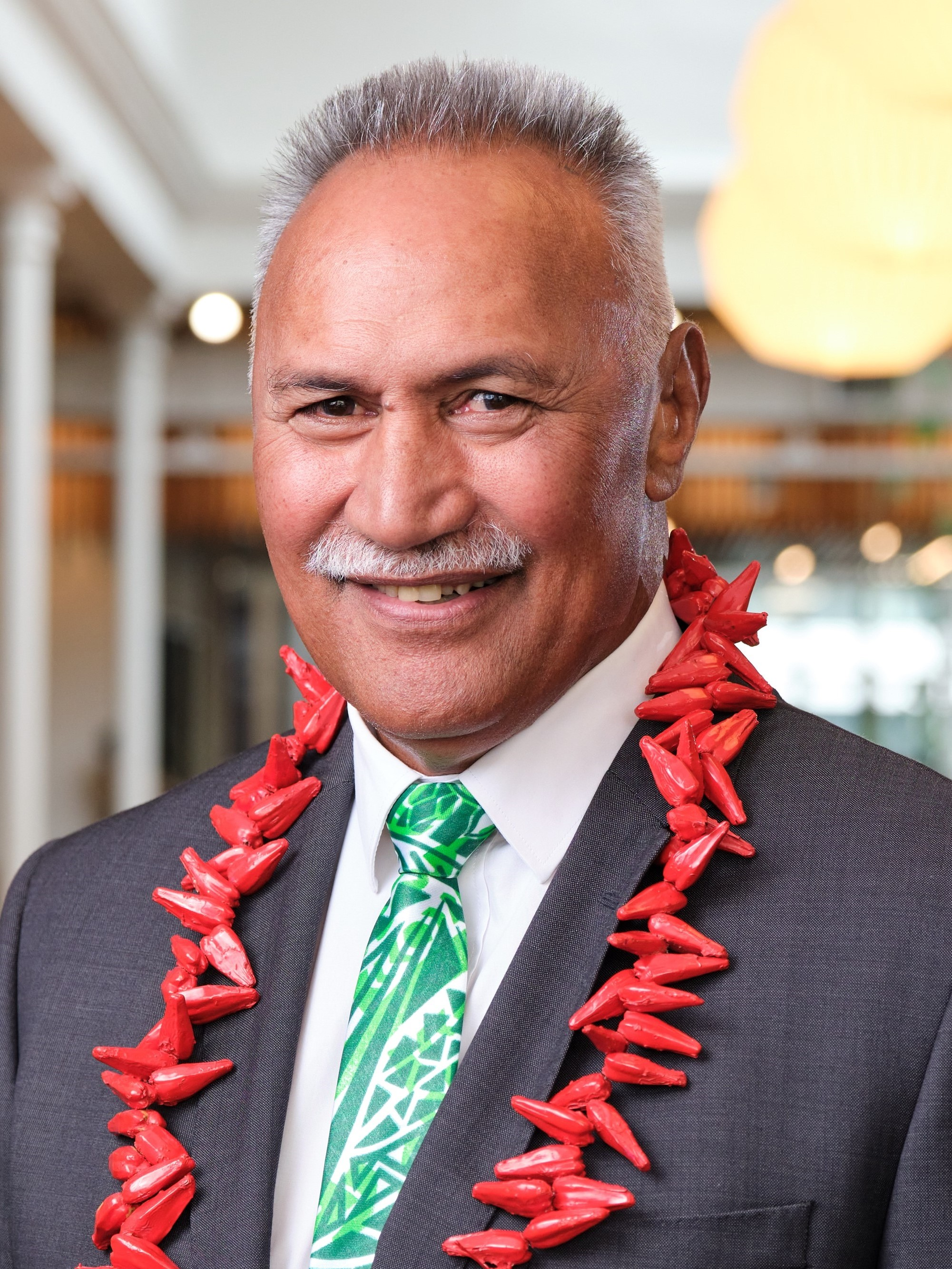
Candidate	David Ogden	Ray Wallace	Ken Laban
Party	Independent	Independent	Hutt 2020 – Labour
Popular vote	7,352	7,126	6,912
Percentage	26.79	25.97	25.19
Mayor before election
David Ogden
Elected mayor
David Ogden

The 2007 Lower Hutt mayoral election was part of the wider 2007 New Zealand local elections. The elections were held for the role of Mayor of Lower Hutt plus other local government positions including twelve city councillors, also elected triennially. The polling was conducted using the standard first-past-the-post electoral method.

== Background ==
The incumbent Mayor, David Ogden, stood for a second term. He faced multiple opponents, by councillors Ray Wallace and Ross Jamieson as well as Hutt Valley District Health Board member Ken Laban and former regional councillor Rosemarie Thomas.

== Mayoral results ==
The following table gives the election results:

2007 Lower Hutt mayoral election
Party	Candidate	Votes	%	±%
Independent	David Ogden	7,352	26.79	−14.73
Independent	Ray Wallace	7,126	25.97	
Hutt 2020 – Labour	Ken Laban	6,912	25.19	
Independent	Rosemarie Thomas	3,507	12.78	
Independent	Ross Jamieson	2,678	9.75	
Informal votes		505	1.84	+1.51
Majority		226	0.82	−6.71
Turnout		28,080	41.10	+4.10

== Ward results ==
Twelve candidates were also elected from wards to the Hutt City Council.

Party/ticket	Councillors
Independent	9
Our City, Our Future	3
