= 2013 Lower Hutt mayoral election =

← 2010	12 October 2013	2016 →
- Turnout: 24,857 (36.36%)
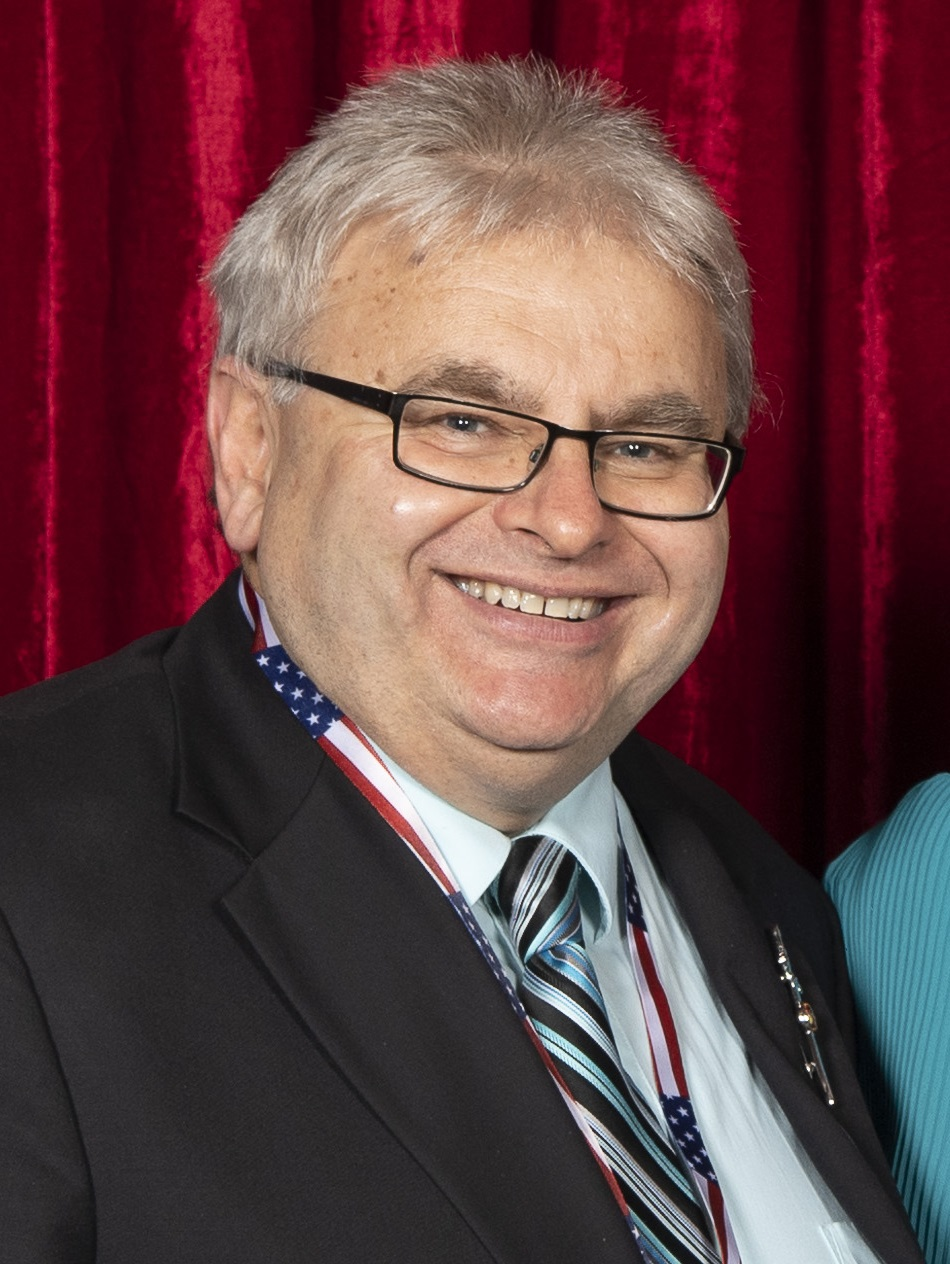

Candidate	Ray Wallace	Phil Stratford
Party	Independent	Independent
Popular vote	21,513	3,326
Percentage	86.54	13.39
Mayor before election
Ray Wallace
Elected mayor
Ray Wallace

The 2013 Lower Hutt mayoral election was part of the wider 2013 New Zealand local elections. The elections were held for the role of Mayor of Lower Hutt plus other local government positions including twelve city councillors, also elected triennially. The polling was conducted using the standard first-past-the-post electoral method.

== Background ==
The incumbent Mayor, Ray Wallace, stood for a second term. He was opposed by property developer Phil "Stratty" Stratford.

== Mayoral results ==
2013 Lower Hutt mayoral election
Party	Candidate	Votes	%	±%
Independent	Ray Wallace	21,513	86.54	+28.49
Independent	Phil Stratford	3,326	13.39	
Informal votes		18	0.07	−2.70
Majority		18,187	73.16	+54.28
Turnout		24,857	36.36	−3.74

== Ward results ==
Twelve candidates were also elected from wards to the Hutt City Council.

Party/ticket	Councillors
Independent	11
City Vision	1
