= 2016 Lower Hutt mayoral election =

← 2013	8 October 2016	2019 →
- Turnout: 26,044 (37.84%)
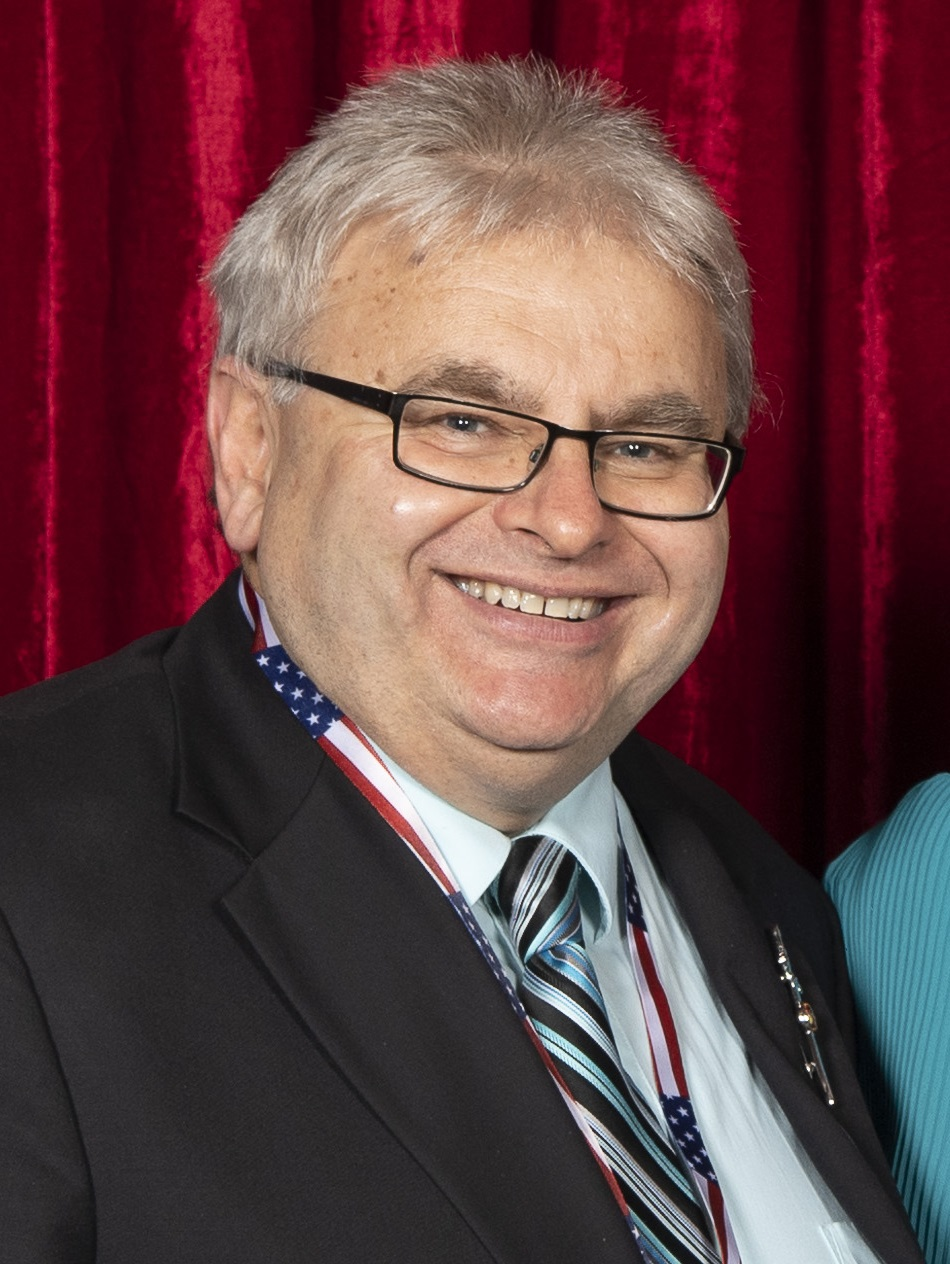

Candidate	Ray Wallace	James Anderson
Party	Independent	Independent
Popular vote	20,585	1,925
Percentage	79.03	7.39
Mayor before election
Ray Wallace
Elected mayor
Ray Wallace

The 2016 Lower Hutt mayoral election was part of the wider 2016 New Zealand local elections. The elections were held for the role of Mayor of Lower Hutt plus other local government positions including twelve city councillors, also elected triennially. The polling was conducted using the standard first-past-the-post electoral method.

== Background ==
The incumbent Mayor, Ray Wallace, stood for a third term. He was opposed by truck driver James Anderson, former city councillor Glenda Barratt, property developer Phil "Stratty" Stratford and cleaning business owner David L.F. Smith.

== Mayoral results ==
2016 Lower Hutt mayoral election
Party	Candidate	Votes	%	±%
Independent	Ray Wallace	20,585	79.03	−7.51
Independent	James Anderson	1,925	7.39	
Independent	Glenda Barratt	1,706	6.55	
Independent	Phil Stratford	1,101	4.22	−9.17
Independent	David Smith	654	2.51	
Informal votes		73	0.28	+0.21
Majority		18,660	71.64	−1.52
Turnout		26,044	37.84	+1.48

== Ward results ==
Twelve candidates were also elected from wards to the Hutt City Council.

Party/ticket	Councillors
Independent	11
Greens	1
