= 2019 Hawke's Bay Regional Council election =

← 2016	12 October 2019	2022 →

The 2019 Hawke's Bay Regional Council election was held on 12 October 2019 via postal vote as part of the wider 2019 New Zealand local elections to elect members to sub-national councils and boards. 9 regional councillors were elected using the first-past-the-post system.

== Council ==
=== Wairoa constituency ===
The Wairoa constituency returned one councillor to the regional council.

2019 Hawke's Bay Regional Council – Wairoa constituency election
Affiliation	Candidate	Votes	%
None	Charles Lambert	1365	50.1
Independent	Fenton Wilson	1266	46.5
Informal: 1 Blank: 93 Total voters: 2725

=== Napier constituency ===
The Napier constituency returned three councillors to the regional council.

2019 Hawke's Bay Regional Council – Napier constituency election
Affiliation	Candidate	Votes	%
Protecting our waterways	Ormsby HinewaI	11838	52.8
None	Neil Kirton	11576	51.7
None	Martin Williams	10312	46.0
None	Nichola Nicholson	8668	38.7
Independent	Paul Bailey	6880	30.7
None	John Smith	2202	9.8
Informal: 20 Blank: 727 Total voters: 22402

=== Hastings constituency ===
The Hastings constituency returned three councillors to the regional council.

2019 Hawke's Bay Regional Council – Hastings constituency election
Affiliation	Candidate	Votes	%
None	Rick Barker	7075	41.0
None	Rex Graham	6799	39.4
The right balance	Craig Foss	6486	37.6
None	Tom Belford	5825	33.9
None	Peter Guerin	5559	32.2
Honest independent	Tim Gilbertson	4620	26.8
Independent	Mary O'Neill	4131	23.9
Independent	Grant R Seton	2344	13.6
Informal: 55 Blank: 804 Total voters: 17259

=== Ngaruroro constituency ===
The Ngaruroro constituency returned one councillor to the regional council.

2019 Hawke's Bay Regional Council – Ngaruroro constituency election
Affiliation	Candidate	Votes	%
Independent	Jerf van Beek	4157	58.3
Independent	Guy Wellwood	2396	33.6
Informal: 3 Blank: 578 Total voters: 7136

=== Central Hawke's Bay constituency ===
The Central Hawke's Bay constituency returned one councillor to the regional council.

2019 Hawke's Bay Regional Council – Central Hawke's Bay constituency election
Affiliation	Candidate	Votes	%
Sustainable Tomorrow	Will Foley	3592	59.7
The Gardener	Tony Kuklinski	1643	27.3
Informal: 4 Blank: 201 Total voters: 6013
