= Southern District Health Board =

Former health board in New Zealand

- Location of the Southern DHB (green) in New Zealand
- Successor: Te Whatu Ora
- Formation: 1 May 2010; 16 years ago
- Founder: New Zealand Government
- Dissolved: 1 July 2022; 4 years ago
- Merger of: Otago District Health Board, Southland District Health Board
- Purpose: DHB
- Region served: Otago, Southland
- Services: Health and disability services
- Parent organization: Ministry of Health
- Website: www.southernhealth.nz

The Southern District Health Board (Southern DHB) was a district health board which provided healthcare to an area covering the southern half of the South Island of New Zealand. In July 2022, the Southern DHB was dissolved as part of a nationwide overhaul of the district health board system. Its former functions and responsibilities were taken over by Te Whatu Ora (Health New Zealand).

== History ==
On 1 May 2010, the Otago and Southland DHBs were merged to form a new Southern DHB, with elected members coming from two constituencies – Otago and Southland – and the remainder appointed by the Ministry of Health, with the change taking effect from the 2010 local body elections.

From 1 July 2010, a unified primary health organisation has covered the entire new Southern DHB region with primary health organisation (PHO) centres in Alexandra, Dunedin, and Invercargill with the mandate of providing PHO resources and services, replacing the previous nine PHOs.

=== COVID-19 pandemic ===
On 11 November 2021, Southern DHB member Ilka Beekhuis resigned after she used her title to oppose Countdown's COVID-19 vaccine mandate on employees and voted against a DHB motion calling for a commitment to at least 90% vaccination rates across communities.

=== Dissolution ===
On 1 July 2022, the Southern District Health Board was formally disestablished as part of a nationwide overhaul of the district health board system. Te Whatu Ora (Health New Zealand) assumed control over the former DHB's oversight of hospitals and health services. As part of the overhaul, the Southern DHB's functions and operations were inherited by Te Whatu Ora Te Waipounamu, which covers the entire South Island.

== Geographic area ==
The area covered by the Southern District Health Board is defined in Schedule 1 of the New Zealand Public Health and Disability Act 2000 and based on territorial authority and ward boundaries as constituted as at 1 January 2001. The area can be adjusted through an Order in Council.

== Governance ==
The initial board was fully appointed. Since the 2001 local elections, the board has been partially elected (seven members) and in addition, up to four members get appointed by the Minister of Health. The minister also appoints the chairperson and deputy-chair from the pool of eleven board members. From 2015 to 2019 the elected board was replaced by a Commissioner appointed by the Minister.

== Demographics ==
Historical population
Year	Pop.	±% p.a.
2006	286,224	—
2013	297,420	+0.55%
2018	324,405	+1.75%

Southern DHB covered a population of 324,405 at the 2018 New Zealand census, an increase of 26,985 people (9.1%) since the 2013 census, and an increase of 38,181 people (13.3%) since the 2006 census. There were 125,028 households. There were 160,581 males and 163,821 females, giving a sex ratio of 0.98 males per female. The median age was 38.8 years (compared with 37.4 years nationally), with 57,030 people (17.6%) aged under 15 years, 69,372 (21.4%) aged 15 to 29, 144,042 (44.4%) aged 30 to 64, and 53,958 (16.6%) aged 65 or older.

Ethnicities were 86.8% European/Pākehā, 10.5% Māori, 2.7% Pacific peoples, 6.6% Asian, and 2.8% other ethnicities. People may identify with more than one ethnicity.

The percentage of people born overseas was 18.8, compared with 27.1% nationally.

Although some people objected to giving their religion, 54.2% had no religion, 34.9% were Christian, 0.8% were Hindu, 0.6% were Muslim, 0.6% were Buddhist and 2.2% had other religions.

Of those at least 15 years old, 54,003 (20.2%) people had a bachelor or higher degree, and 51,210 (19.2%) people had no formal qualifications. The median income was $30,600, compared with $31,800 nationally. 38,088 people (14.2%) earned over $70,000 compared to 17.2% nationally. The employment status of those at least 15 was that 134,193 (50.2%) people were employed full-time, 42,774 (16.0%) were part-time, and 8,490 (3.2%) were unemployed.

== Hospitals ==
=== Public hospitals ===
The following public hospitals are run by Southern District Health Board:

- Dunedin Hospital (45.869706°S 170.508360°E) in Dunedin Central, Dunedin has 361 beds and provides geriatric, maternity, surgical, medical, psychogeriatric and children's health services.
- Lakes District Hospital (45.023181°S 168.736226°E) in Queenstown, Queenstown Lakes District has 15 beds and provides medical and maternity services.
- Southland Hospital (46.439005°S 168.357157°E) in Kew, Invercargill has 168 beds and provides surgical, geriatric, maternity, medical, mental health and children's health services.
- Wakari Hospital (45.859008°S 170.472966°E) in Halfway Bush, Dunedin has 90 beds and provides intellectual, medical and mental health services.

Gore had a public hospital, Seddon Memorial Hospital, which operated between 1908 and 1999. It had 130 beds and included medical, maternity and aged care services.

=== Private hospitals ===
The following private hospitals are located in the Southern District Health Board area:

- Ashburn Clinic (45.852209°S 170.457696°E) in Halfway Bush, Dunedin has 46 beds and provides mental health services.
- Charlotte Jean Maternity Hospital (45.253184°S 169.387884°E) in Alexandra, Central Otago has 4 beds and provides maternity services.
- Clutha Health First (46.237226°S 169.740937°E) in Balclutha, Clutha has 18 beds and provides maternity and medical services.
- Dunstan Hospital (45.200675°S 169.330831°E) in Clyde, Central Otago has 24 beds and provides medical services.
- Gore Health (46.103003°S 168.936975°E) in Gore, Gore District has 20 beds and provides maternity and medical services.
- Hospice Southland (46.439720°S 168.356332°E) in Kew, Invercargill has 8 beds and provides medical services.
- Mercy Hospital (45.861147°S 170.498998°E) in Maori Hill, Dunedin has 66 beds and provides surgical services.
- Oamaru Hospital (45.099467°S 170.968253°E) in Oamaru, Waitaki District has 44 beds and provides geriatric, maternity and medical services.
- Otago Community Hospice (45.848185°S 170.532076°E) in North East Valley, Dunedin has 12 beds and provides medical services.
- Southern Cross Hospital Invercargill (46.407077°S 168.353568°E) in Invercargill Central, Invercargill has 26 beds and provides surgical and medical services.
- Winton Maternity Centre (46.134797°S 168.325685°E) in Winton, Southland District has 6 beds and provides maternity services.
