= 2022 Lower Hutt mayoral election =

Local election in New Zealand

- 8 October 2022
- Turnout: 31,113 (40.24%)
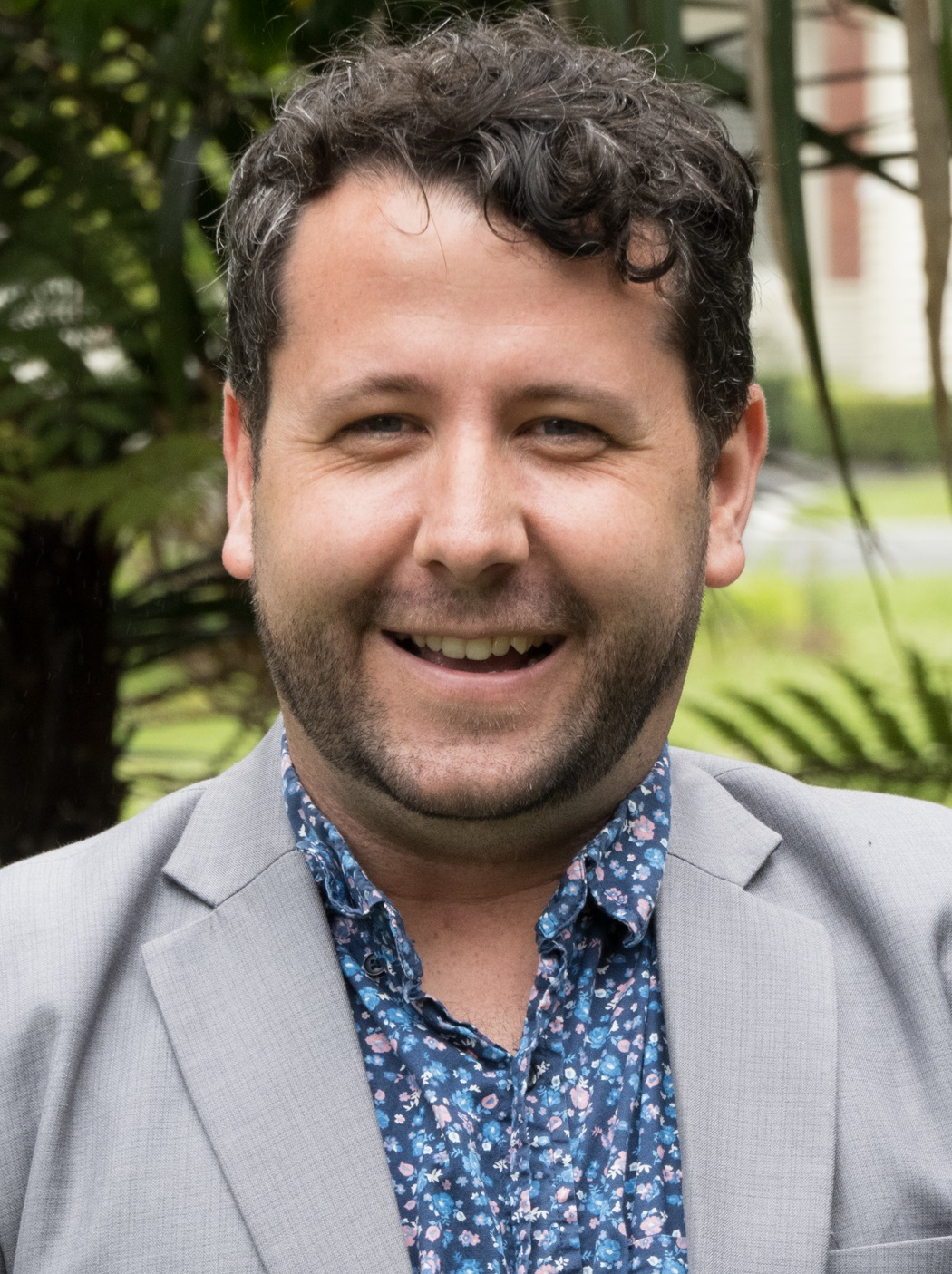

Candidate	Campbell Barry	Tony Stallinger
Party	Labour	United Hutt
Popular vote	16,163	13,720
Percentage	51.94	44.09
Mayor before election
Campbell Barry
Elected mayor
Campbell Barry

The 2022 Lower Hutt mayoral election was part of the wider 2022 New Zealand local elections. The elections were held for the role of Mayor of Lower Hutt plus other local government positions including twelve city councillors, also elected triennially. The polling was conducted using the standard first-past-the-post electoral method.

== Background ==
The incumbent Mayor, Campbell Barry, stood for a second term. He was opposed by retailer Falgoon Patel and former Hutt City Council chief executive Tony Stallinger. Stallinger was critical of the council finances promising to reduce spending and limit rate increases, contrasting to Barry who campaigned on investment into infrastructure for the city. Stallinger set up United Hutt, a political grouping which claimed to oppose the presence of political parties in local government, which media commented as being a contradiction in terms.

=== Fundraising ===
United Hutt and its candidates were criticised for using the organisation to obscure election funding transparency by not listing donations over $1500 and not recording all of their expenses. A former mathematics teacher, Wayne Paaka, who was involved with the local Labour Party, complained to the council alleging United Hutt had breached the election rules around returns. The council returning officer, Bruce Hodgins, stated United Hutt's election return was not made in the spirit of the relevant legislation and also lacked transparency. Hodgins consequently referred Paaka's complaint to the police.

Campbell Barry Election Funding
Source	Type	Date Received	Amount (NZD)
Amalgamated Workers Union NZ	Union	07/08/2022	$2,000
E TU Incorporated	Union	13/05/2022	$5,000
Rail & Maritime Transport Union	Union	05/03/2022	$3,000
Simon Werry	Political Family	13/9/22 to 4/10/22	$2,450
Dick Werry	Political Family	22/07/2022	$2,000
Hutt South LEC	Political Party	08/09/2022	$5,000
Ginny Andersen	Politician	05/08/2022	$1,800
Total:	$21,250		

Tony Stallinger Election Funding
Source	Type	Date Received	Amount (NZD)
United Hutt Incorporated	Political Party	July to November 2022	$34,892.05
Total:	$34,892.05		

== Mayoral results ==
2022 Lower Hutt mayoral election
Party	Candidate	Votes	%	±%
Labour	Campbell Barry	16,163	51.94	+2.66
United Hutt	Tony Stallinger	13,720	44.09	
Independent	Fangoon Patel	1,200	3.85	
Informal votes		30	0.09	−0.09
Majority		2,443	7.85	+0.14
Turnout		31,113	40.24	−2.76

== Ward results ==
Twelve candidates were also elected from wards to the Hutt City Council.

Party/ticket	Councillors
Independent	9
United Hutt	2
Labour	1
