= Southland District Health Board =

District health board in New Zealand

- Location of the Southland DHB (green) in New Zealand
- Merged into: Otago District Health Board
- Successor: Southern District Health Board
- Formation: 1 January 2001
- Founder: New Zealand Government
- Dissolved: 1 May 2010; 16 years ago
- Legal status: Extinct
- Purpose: DHB
- Services: Health and disability services
- Parent organization: Ministry of Health

The Southland District Health Board (Southland DHB) was a district health board with the focus on providing healthcare to an area covering most of Southland and parts of Otago in New Zealand.

== History ==
The Southland District Health Board, like most other district health boards, came into effect on 1 January 2001 established by the New Zealand Public Health and Disability Act 2000.

On 1 May 2010, the Southland DHB merged with the Otago District Health Board to form the combined Southern District Health Board.

== Geographic area ==
The area covered by the Southland District Health Board is defined in Schedule 1 of the New Zealand Public Health and Disability Act 2000 and based on territorial authority and ward boundaries as constituted as at 1 January 2001. The area could be adjusted through an Order in Council.

== Governance ==
The initial board was fully appointed. Since the 2001 local elections, the board had been partially elected (seven members) and in addition, up to four members get appointed by the Minister of Health. The minister also appointed the chairperson and deputy-chair from the pool of eleven board members.
