= 2007 New Zealand local elections =

Local elections in New Zealand

- 13 October 2007
- 85 of 85 councils
Party	Councils	+/–
missing info		
This lists parties that won seats. See the complete results below.
- 73 mayors, ?? local councillors, and ?? regional councillors
Party	Seats	+/–
Mayors
missing info		
Local councillors
missing info		
Regional councillors
missing info		
This lists parties that won seats. See the complete results below.

The 2007 New Zealand local elections (Māori: Nga Pōtitanga ā-Rohe 2007) were triennial elections that were held from September until 13 October 2007 to elect local mayors and councillors, regional councillors, and members of various other local government bodies.

All 12 of New Zealand's regions and all 73 cities and districts participated in the election.

== Background ==
=== Voting system ===
The single transferable vote (STV) method was first used at the 2004 local elections, when ten districts and city councils employed this alternative to first-past-the-post voting (FPP). Of those ten, two district councils—Papakura and Matamata-Piako—reverted to FPP. The remaining eight councils that used STV in 2007 were Kaipara, Thames-Coromandel, Kāpiti Coast, Porirua, Wellington, Marlborough, Dunedin, and the Chatham Islands. All other councils used first past the post.

All district health boards (DHBs) used STV.

== Elections ==
=== Regional councils ===
The regional level of government in New Zealand is organised into areas controlled by regional councils.

Council	Electoral System	Seats	Councillors		Turnout	Details	Sources
Council	Electoral System	Seats	2004	Result	Turnout	Details	Sources
Northland	FPP	8	8 missing info	8 Independents	45,063 (44.6%)	Details	
Auckland	FPP	13	5 Independents; 3 Citizens & Ratepayers; 2 Team West; 1 City Vision; 1 Advancing Auckland; 1 Residents Action Movement	4 Communities & Residents; 3 Independents; 2 Independents for Manukau; 2 Best for the West; 1 Regional People; 1 Labour	345,863 (38.3%)	Details	
Waikato	FPP	12	14 Independents	6 Rates Control Team; 6 Independents	58,755 (22.2%)	Details	
Bay of Plenty	FPP	13	14 Independents	13 missing info	76,404 (42.3%)	Details	
Hawke's Bay	FPP	9	9 Independents	9 Independents	47,497 (45.2%)	Details	
Taranaki	FPP	11	10 Independents	11 Independents	36,240 (47.6%)	Details	
Manawatu-Wanganui	FPP	12	11 missing info	12 Independents	72,598 (46.8%)	Details	
Wellington	FPP	13	11 Independents; 1 Hutt 2020; 1 Labour	12 missing info; 1 Green	128,255 (39.4%)	Details	
West Coast	FPP	7	6 Independents	6 Independents; 1 Change	12,980 (57.1%)	Details	
Canterbury	FPP	13	14 missing info	9 Independents; 2 Christchurch 2021; 1 Experienced Independent; 1 Independent Citizens	156,770 (41.4%)	Details	
Otago	FPP	11	12 Independents	11 Independents	61,944 (43.7%)	Details	
Southland	FPP	12	12 Independents	12 Independents	21,772 (32.9%)	Details	
All 12 councils		134					

=== Territorial authorities ===
The city and district level of government in New Zealand is organised into areas controlled by territorial authorities. Some of these also have the powers of regional governments and are known as unitary authorities. The Chatham Islands have their own specially legislated form of government.

Council	Electoral System	Seats	Councillors		Turnout	Details	Sources
Council	Electoral System	Seats	2004	Result	Turnout	Details	Sources
Far North	FPP	9	9 Independents	6 Independents; 3 Value for Ratepayers			
Whangarei	FPP	13	13 Independents	12 Independents; 1 Respect Northland			
Kaipara	STV	8	10 Independents	8 Independents			
Rodney	FPP	12	9 Independents; 3 Taking Action Team	5 Independents; 4 The Penlink Team; 2 Working for the West; 1 Team Hibiscus Coast			
Auckland City	FPP	19	6 Citizens & Ratepayers; 6 City Vision; 3 Labour; 2 Action Hobson; 2 Independents	11 Citizens & Ratepayers; 3 City Vision; 3 Independents; 2 Labour			
North Shore	FPP	15	15 missing info	15 Independents			
Waitakere	FPP	14	4 Team West; 4 Residents & Ratepayers; 4 Independents; 2 Massey Community Team	9 Independents; 4 Ratepayers & Residents; 1 Citizens & Ratepayers			
Manukau	FPP	17	7 Independents; 4 Labour; 4 Manurewa Residents; 1 Peoples Choice; 1 Papatoetoe Independents	5 Independents; 3 Labour; 3 Manurewa Residents; 2 People's Choice; 1 Independent - Botany-Clevedon; 1 Residents & Ratepayers; 1 Manurewa Action Team; 1 Papatoetoe Independents			
Papakura	STV	8	7 Independents; 1 Papakura Vision	6 Independents; 2 Pride of Papakura			
Franklin	FPP	12	12 Independents	12 Independents			
Thames-Coromandel	STV	8	8 Independents; 1 vacant	8 Independents			
Hauraki	FPP	13	13 Independents	13 Independents			
Waikato	FPP	13	13 Independents	13 Independents			
Matamata-Piako	STV	11	11 Independents	11 Independents			
Hamilton	FPP	12	12 Independents; 1 Hamilton Citizens & Ratepayers Assoc. Inc.	11 Independents; 1 Hamilton Citizens & Ratepayers Assoc. Inc.			
Waipa	FPP	12	10 Independents; 2 missing info	12 Independents			
Otorohanga	FPP	7	7 Independents	7 Independents			
South Waikato	FPP	10	10 Independents	10 Independents			
Waitomo	FPP	6	6 Independents	6 Independents			
Taupo	FPP	10	12 Independents	10 Independents			
Western Bay of Plenty	FPP	12	12 Independents	12 Independents			
Tauranga	FPP	10	10 missing info	6 missing info; 4 Pick 6 for Community First			
Rotorua Lakes	FPP	12	12 Independents	12 Independents			
Whakatane	FPP	10	10 Independents; 1 vacant	10 Independents			
Kawerau	FPP	8	8 Independents	8 Independents			
Opotiki	FPP	6	6 missing info	6 Independents			
Gisborne	FPP	14	14 Independents	14 Independents			
Wairoa	FPP	6	9 missing info	9 Independents			
Hastings	FPP	14	15 Independents	14 Independents			
Napier	FPP	12	12 Independents	12 Independents			
Central Hawke's Bay	FPP	8	10 Independents	8 Independents			
New Plymouth	FPP	14	14 Independents	14 Independents			
Stratford	FPP	9	10 Independents	9 Independents			
South Taranaki	FPP	12	12 Independents	12 Independents			
Ruapehu	FPP	11	11 Independents	11 Independents			
Wanganui	FPP	12	6 Vision Wanganui; 5 Independents; 1 Wanganui Ratepayers Association	7 Independents; 5 Vision Wanganui			
Rangitikei	FPP	11	11 Independents	11 Independents			
Manawatu	FPP	10	10 Independents	10 Independents			
Palmerston North	FPP	15	15 missing info	15 Independents			
Tararua	FPP	8	8 Independents	8 Independents			
Horowhenua	FPP	10	10 missing info	10 Independents			
Kapiti Coast	STV	10	9 Independents; 1 Affordable Kapiti	10 Independents			
Porirua	STV	13	8 missing info; 5 Labour	8 missing info; 5 Labour			
Upper Hutt	FPP	10	10 Independents	10 Independents			
Lower Hutt	FPP	12	5 Independents; 3 City Vision – Terris' Team; 2 Our City, Our Future; 1 Hutt 2020	7 Indepedents; 3 Our City, Our Future; 2 Team Ray Wallace			
Wellington	STV	14	10 Independents; 1 Alliance; 1 1-2-3 for North; 1 Labour; 1 Green	12 missing info; 2 Green		Details	
Masterton	FPP	10	10 Independents	10 Independents			
Carterton	FPP	8	8 Independents	8 Independents			
South Wairarapa	FPP	9	9 Independents	9 Independents			
Tasman	FPP	13	13 Independents	13 Independents			
Nelson	FPP	12	12 Independents	6 Hands Up; 6 missing info			
Marlborough	STV	13	13 Independents	13 Independents			
Buller	FPP	10	11 Independents	10 Independents			
Grey	FPP	8	8 Independents	5 Independents; 3 Change Now			
Westland	FPP	10	12 Independents	10 Independents			
Kaikoura	FPP	7	7 Independents	7 Independents			
Hurunui	FPP	9	9 Independents	9 Independents			
Waimakariri	FPP	10	10 Independents	10 Independents			
Christchurch	FPP	13	9 Independents; 2 Independent Citizens; 1 Labour for Christchurch 2021	7 Independents; 4 Independent Citizens; 2 Christchurch 2021			
Selwyn	FPP	10	10 Independents	10 Independents			
Ashburton	FPP	12	12 Independents	12 Independents			
Timaru	FPP	10	12 Independents	10 Independents			
Mackenzie	FPP	6	6 Independents	6 Independents			
Waimate	FPP	8	8 Independents	8 Independents			
Waitaki	FPP	10	10 missing info	10 Independents			
Central Otago	FPP	10	13 Independents	10 Independents			
Queenstown-Lakes	FPP	10	11 Independents	10 Independents			
Dunedin	STV	14	14 missing info	12 Independents; 2 Greater Dunedin			
Clutha	FPP	14	14 Independents	14 Independents			
Southland	FPP	12	12 Independents	12 Independents			
Gore	FPP	11	11 Independents	11 Independents			
Invercargill	FPP	12	12 Independents	12 Independents			
Chatham Islands	STV	8	8 Independents	8 Independents			
All 73 councils		791					

=== Mayors ===
All territorial authorities (including the unitary authorities) directly elected mayors.

Territorial authority	Incumbent	Elected	Runner-up	Details	Sources
Far North	Yvonne Sharp (Ind)	Wayne Brown (Ind)	Yvonne Sharp (Ind)		
Whangarei	Pamela Peters (Ind)	Stan Semenoff (Ind)	Pamela Peters (Ind)		
Kaipara	Peter King (Ind)	Neil Tiller (Ind)	Peter King (Ind)		
Rodney	John Law (Ind)	Penny Webster (Ind)	Wayne Walker (Ind)		
Auckland City	Dick Hubbard (Ind)	John Banks (Ind)	Dick Hubbard (Ind)	Details	
North Shore	George Wood (Ind)	Andrew Williams (Ind)	George Wood (Ind)		
Waitakere	Bob Harvey (Ind)		John Tamihere (Ind)		
Manukau	Barry Curtis (Ind)	Len Brown (Ind)	Dick Quax (Ind)		
Papakura	John Robertson (Ind)	Calum Penrose (Ind)	John Robertson (Ind)		
Franklin	Mark Ball (Ind)		William Cotter (Ind)		
Thames-Coromandel	Phillipa Barriball (Ind)		Dal Minogue (Ind)		
Hauraki	John Tregidga (Ind)		Raymond Bassett (Ind)		
Waikato	Peter Harris (Ind)		unopposed		
Matamata-Piako	Hugh Vercoe (Ind)		Endine Dixon-Harris (Ind)		
Hamilton	Michael Redman (Ind)	Bob Simcock (Ind)	Roger Hennebry (Ind)		
Waipa	Alan Livingston (Ind)		Stephen Lee (Ind)		
Otorohanga	Dale Williams (Ind)		unopposed		
South Waikato	Neil Sinclair (Ind)		Francis Campbell (Ind)		
Waitomo	Mark Ammon (Ind)		unopposed		
Taupō	Clayton Stent (Ind)		Clayton Stent (Ind)		
Western Bay of Plenty	Graeme Weld (Ind)		unopposed		
Tauranga	Stuart Crosby (Ind)		Murray Guy (Ind)		
Rotorua	Kevin Winters (Ind)		Lyall Thurston (Ind)		
Whakatane	Colin Holmes (Ind)		Ian Shearer (Ind)		
Kawerau	Malcolm Campbell (Ind)		Pat Norris (Ind)		
Opotiki	John Forbes (Ind)		unopposed		
Gisborne	Meng Foon (Ind)		Arthur Cunningham (Ind)		
Wairoa	Les Probert (Ind)		Denys Caves (Ind)		
Hastings	Lawrence Yule (Ind)		Simon Nixon (Ind)		
Napier	Barbara Arnott (Ind)		Clifford Church (Ind)		
Central Hawke's Bay	Tim Gilbertson (Ind)	Trish Giddens (Ind)	Peter Butler (Ind)		
New Plymouth	Peter Tennent (Ind)		Sherill George (Ind)		
Stratford	Brian Jeffares (Ind)	John Edwards (Ind)	Neil Volzke (Ind)		
South Taranaki	Ross Dunlop (Ind)		Steve Pivac (Ind)		
Ruapehu	Sue Morris (Ind)		? (Ind)		
Wanganui	Michael Laws (Ind)		John Martin (Ind)		
Rangitikei	Bob Buchanan (Ind)	Chalky Leary (Ind)	Andy Watson (Ind)		
Manawatu	Ian McKelvie (Ind)		Steve Gibson (Ind)		
Palmerston North	Heather Tanguay (Ind)	Jono Naylor (Ind)	Heather Tanguay (Ind)		
Tararua	Maureen Reynolds (Ind)		Ivan Johanson (Ind)		
Horowhenua	Tom Robinson (Ind)	Brendan Duffy (Ind)	Anne Hunt (Ind)		
Kapiti Coast	Alan Milne (Ind)	Jenny Rowan (Ind)	Chris Turver (Ind)		
Porirua	Jenny Brash (Ind)		Selwyn Katene (Ind)		
Upper Hutt	Wayne Guppy (Ind)		unopposed		
Lower Hutt	David Ogden (Ind)		Ray Wallace (Ind)	Details	
Wellington	Kerry Prendergast (Ind)		Ray Ahipene-Mercer (Ind)	Details	
Masterton	Bob Francis (Ind)	Gary Daniell (Ind)	Rick Long (Ind)		
Carterton	Gary McPhee (Ind)		Janine Vollebreght (Ind)		
South Wairarapa	Adrienne Staples (Ind)		Bob Petelin (Ind)		
Tasman	John Hurley (Ind)	Richard Kempthorne (Ind)	John Hurley (Ind)		
Nelson	Paul Matheson (Ind)	Kerry Marshall (Ind)	Gary Watson (Ind)		
Marlborough	Alistair Sowman (Ind)		Pat O'Sullivan (Ind)		
Buller	Martin Sawyers (Ind)	Patrick McManus (Ind)	Patrick O'Dea (Ind)		
Grey	Tony Kokshoorn (Ind)		unopposed		
Westland	Maureen Pugh (Ind)		unopposed		
Kaikoura	Kevin Heays (Ind)		Jim Abernathy (Ind)		
Hurunui	Garry Jackson (Ind)	Brendan Duffy (Ind)	Anne Hunt (Ind)		
Waimakariri	Jim Gerard (Ind)	Ron Keating (Ind)	Jim Gerard (Ind)		
Christchurch	Garry Moore (Ind)	Bob Parker (Ind)	Megan Woods (Ind)	Details	
Selwyn	Michael McEvedy (Ind)	Kevin Coe (Ind)	John Morten (Ind)		
Ashburton	Bede O'Malley (Ind)		unopposed		
Timaru	Janie Annear (Ind)		McGregor Simpson (Ind)		
Mackenzie	Joel O'Neill (Ind)		unopposed		
Waimate	John Coles (Ind)		Anne Townend (Ind)		
Waitaki	Alan McLay (Ind)	Alex Familton (Ind)	Alan McLay (Ind)		
Central Otago	Malcolm MacPherson (Ind)		Mike Bain (Ind)		
Queenstown-Lakes	Cleve Geddes (Ind)		Philip Dunstan (Ind)		
Dunedin	Peter Chin (Ind)		Lee Vandervis (Ind)	Details	
Clutha	Juno Hayes (Ind)		unopposed		
Southland	Frana Cardno (Ind)		Sue Anderson (Ind)		
Gore	Tracy Hicks (Ind)		Des Pringle (Ind)		
Invercargill	Tim Shadbolt (Ind)		Cornelis Vreugdenhil (Ind)	Details	
Chatham Islands	Patrick Smith (Ind)		unopposed		
