= Campbell Barry =

New Zealand politician (born 1991)

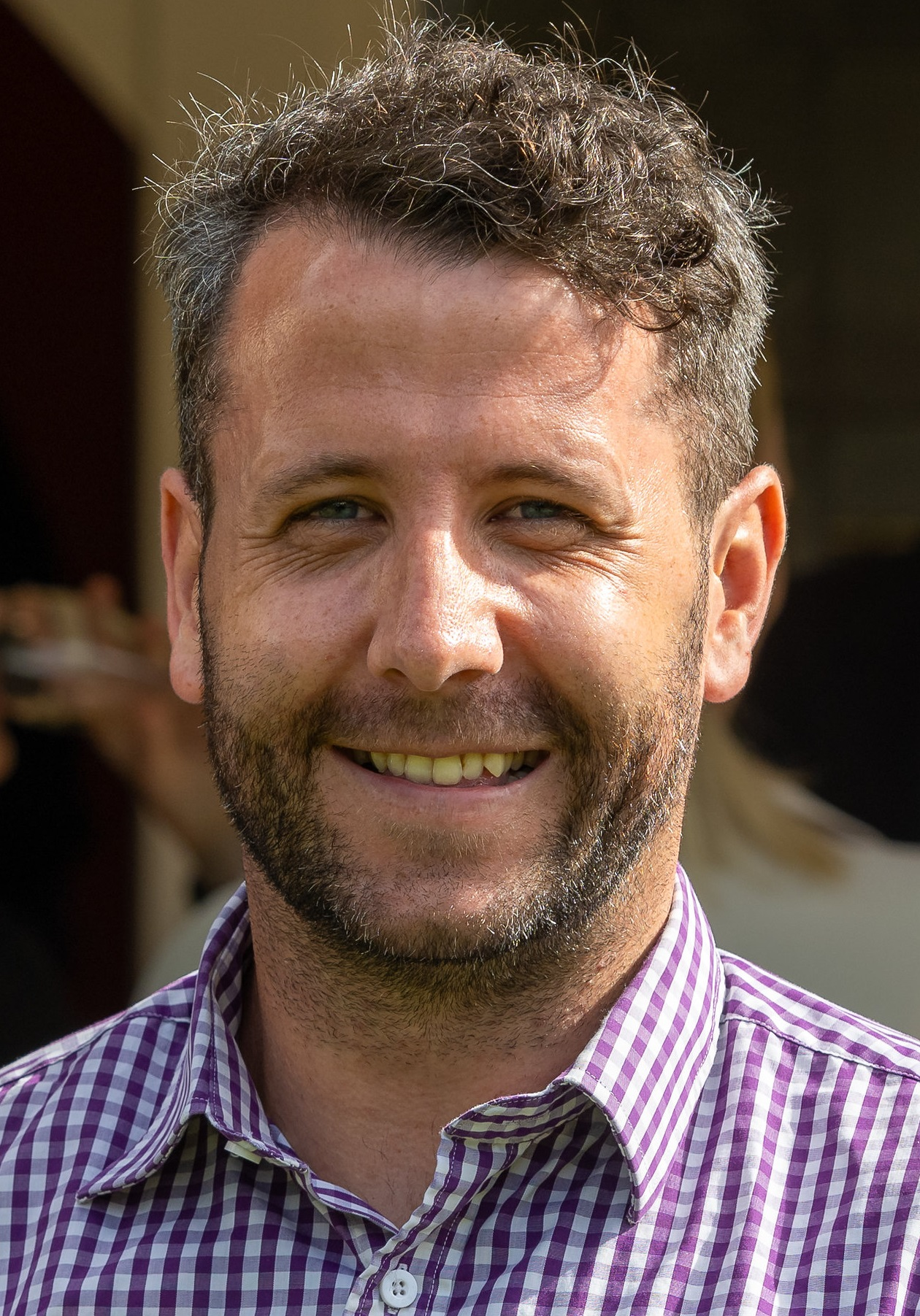
- Barry in 2025

20th Mayor of Lower Hutt
- In office 23 October 2019 – 17 October 2025
- Deputy: Tui Lewis
- Preceded by: Ray Wallace
- Succeeded by: Ken Laban

Hutt City Councillor for the Wainuiomata Ward
- In office 12 October 2013 – 23 October 2019
- Succeeded by: Keri Brown

Personal details
- Born: 1991 (age 34–35)
- Party: Labour
- Spouse: Laura Barry (m. 2019)
- Education: Victoria University of Wellington

Campbell Nicholas Barry (born 1991) is a New Zealand politician. He served as Mayor of Lower Hutt from 2019 to 2025.

== Biography ==
=== Early life ===
Barry was educated at Wainuiomata High School. He went on to study at Victoria University of Wellington, graduating with a Bachelor of Arts degree in 2018.

=== Political career ===
At the 2013 local body elections, Barry was elected a member of the Hutt City Council for the Wainuiomata ward and was re-elected in 2016. He was the youngest person ever to be elected onto the city council.

In October 2016, Barry contested the Labour Party nomination for the electorate of Hutt South for the 2017 election against Ginny Andersen and Sarah Packer after long-serving member of parliament Trevor Mallard signalled his intention to stand as a list-only candidate at the election. Andersen won the selection.

In June 2017, Barry raised a motion to abolish ratepayer-funded meals for city councillors at long meetings, as he believed elected members should pay for their own meals after the Council decided to introduce what he called "a sham Living Wage Policy". After a 7–6 vote, with mayor Ray Wallace voting in favour of retaining the meals, a public backlash engulfed the Council in controversy.

At the 2019 local-body elections, Barry was elected mayor of Lower Hutt, beating the incumbent Ray Wallace by 15,453 votes to 13,034. At 28, he was the youngest person ever elected to the office of mayor of a city in New Zealand. (Note: Kevin O'Hara was elected mayor of a borough council (Mount Maunganui) aged 26 in 1974.)

In July 2020 his council secured funding from the government to rebuild the Naenae pool, fulfilling a campaign promise. The council co-funded the project. In September of the same year the council passed a change to the city's rubbish collection system.

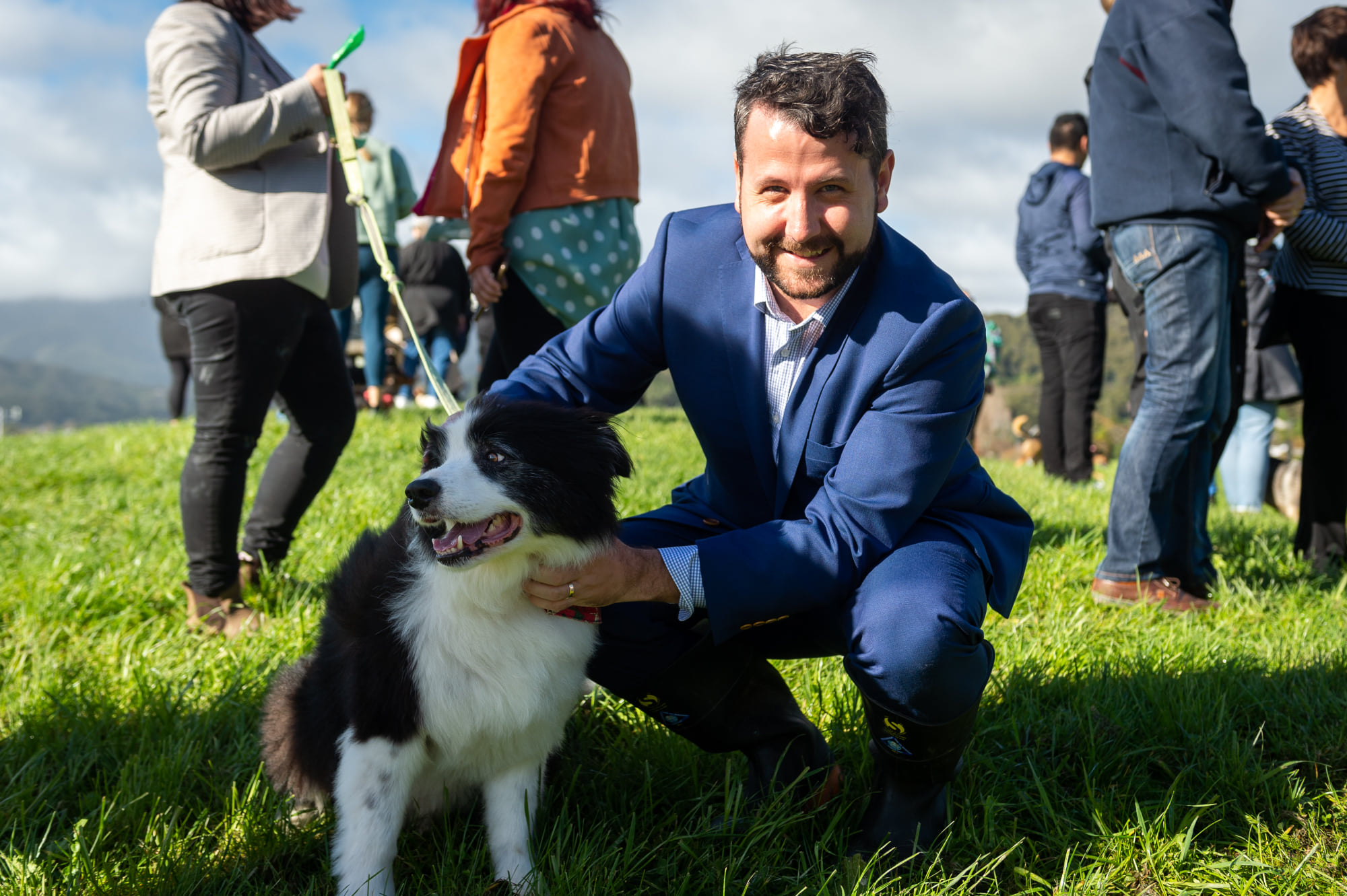
Barry, at the opening of the Les Dalton Dog Park, on 15 May 2021

On 15 May 2021, Barry opened Lower Hutt's first Dog Park. Named after veteran animal control officer, Les Dalton. Barry said at the opening "It was a real privilege to open the park alongside Les’ wife Jill. As everyone said, Les would be extremely excited and proud to see the park open today."

In May 2021, Barry was elected as the new chair of Wellington Water Committee, replacing the outgoing Chair David Bassett who had held the role since the establishment of Wellington Water in 2014.

In 2021, he made the comment about the group, Speak Up For Women, a group formed in opposition to the Births, Deaths, Marriages, and Relationships Registration Act 2021, asking "if this group needs a venue in the Hutt, I've got some nice new waste bins they can use?" Following a complaint by the New Zealand branch of the Free Speech Union, he apologised for his comment.

He was re-elected in 2022 with a 2,443 vote majority over Tony Stallinger of the United Hutt group.

In 2025, Barry decided not to seek re-election as mayor in that year's local elections.

== Footnotes ==
Political offices
Preceded by Ray Wallace	Mayor of Lower Hutt; 2019–present	Incumbent
