= David Ogden (politician) =

Former mayor of Lower Hutt, New Zealand

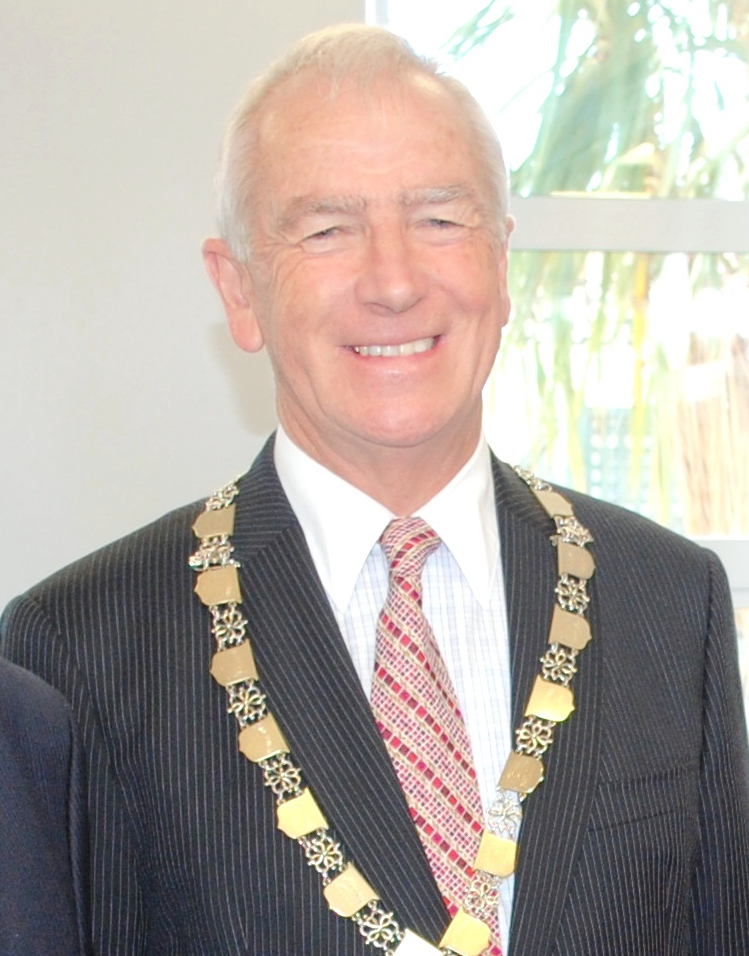
- Ogden in 2010

18th Mayor of Lower Hutt
- In office October 2004 – 9 October 2010
- Deputy: Roger Styles
- Preceded by: John Terris
- Succeeded by: Ray Wallace

Personal details
- Born: 1944 (age 81–82) Wellington, New Zealand
- Party: Future New Zealand (1999)
- Profession: Accountant

David Kevin Ogden JP (born 1944) is a former mayor of Lower Hutt in the Wellington region of New Zealand.

== Biography ==
Ogden was born in Newtown, Wellington, in 1944. He grew up in Miramar and attended Miramar North School and later Wellington High School where he was a prefect. After briefly considering architecture he studied accountancy at Victoria University. He did not graduate but became a chartered accountant working at Fletcher Construction. He later became head of finance at TV1. He is a justice of the peace.

He first stood for political office in 1980 and was elected to the Lower Hutt City Council on the United Citizens ticket of then-mayor John Kennedy-Good. Re-elected in 1983, he chose not to stand again in 1986 to focus on accountancy. In 1992 he was elected to the Wellington Regional Council before failing in re-election bids in 1995 and 1998. Ogden stood in the 1999 election in the Hutt South electorate for Future New Zealand and gained 1.57% of the electorate vote. He was in rank 13 on the Future New Zealand party list.

He returned to the City Council for a term from 1998 to 2001. In 2001 he was elected to the Hutt Valley District Health Board. Ogden was first elected mayor in 2004, beating incumbent Mayor John Terris running on a pledge to reduce debt, limit rates and fix flooding problems. His campaign benefited greatly after Terris was hospitalised with blood poisoning at the start of the election campaign. He was re-elected in 2007 with a reduced majority, but was defeated in 2010 by sitting councillor Ray Wallace.

In 2016 he was elected for a second time to the Regional Council. After moving from Lower Hutt to the Kāpiti Coast. In 2022 he stood unsuccessfully as a candidate for the Kāpiti Coast District Council in the Paraparaumu Ward.

== Personal life ==
He first married in 1965 with whom he had three children before divorcing in 1996. He remarried in 1997, though the marriage was only to last a few weeks. In 2000 he met American-born lawyer Teresa Shreves who he married in 2007.

== Notes ==
Political offices
Preceded by John Terris	Mayor of Lower Hutt; 2004–2010	Succeeded by Ray Wallace
