= Ray Wallace (mayor) =

New Zealand politician

Ray Wallace ONZM JP
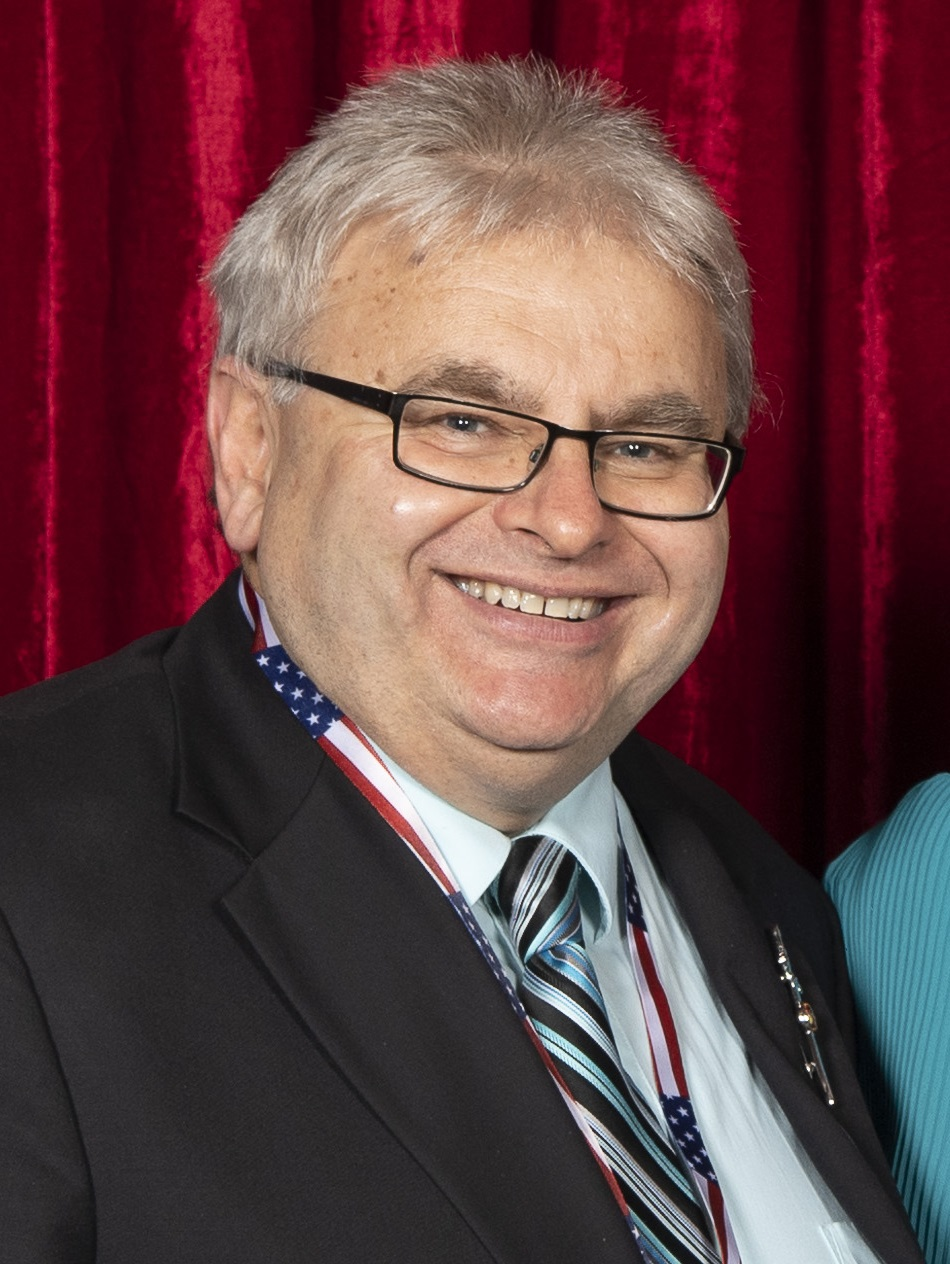
- Wallace in 2018

19th Mayor of Lower Hutt
- In office 9 October 2010 – 12 October 2019
- Deputy: David Bassett
- Preceded by: David Ogden
- Succeeded by: Campbell Barry

22nd Deputy Mayor of Lower Hutt
- In office 6 November 2001 – October 2004
- Preceded by: Pat Brosnan
- Succeeded by: Roger Styles

Personal details
- Born: William Raymond Wallace; 1961 (age 64–65) Kirkcaldy, Fife, Scotland
- Party: Independent; National (1990s)

William Raymond Wallace ONZM JP (born 1961) is a New Zealand politician. He served as mayor of Lower Hutt from 2010 to 2019.

== Biography ==
=== Early life ===
Wallace was born in Kirkcaldy, Scotland, in 1961. He received his education at Te Aro Primary, St Mark's Church School and Wellington College. He has worked in real estate, health care, and the security industry. Wallace is married and lives in Lower Hutt.

=== Political career ===
Wallace stood for the National Party in the seat of Pencarrow (which covered much of Lower Hutt) at the 1990 general election. He lost to Labour's Sonja Davies.

Wallace was first elected to Hutt City Council in the Wainuiomata ward in a 1995 by-election, he served as deputy mayor from 2001 to 2004. Wallace first challenged incumbent David Ogden for the mayoralty in 2007 and came a close second in the three-person race. In the 2010 election, only Ogden and Wallace contested the mayoralty, and the latter won with a healthy majority. He won re-election in the 2013 local elections, achieving a significant majority over his only rival, Phil Stratford. Wallace and Stratford received 20,540 and 3,166 votes, respectively.

Wallace was known for his staunch opposition to "Super Cities" in New Zealand and fought against the proposal for one to occur in Wellington. In 2016 Wallace was re-elected to the mayoralty for a third term, 17,011 votes ahead of his nearest rival, James Anderson.

In June 2017 Wallace hit media headlines for his decision to retain rate payer funded meals. The motion was raised by Councillor Campbell Barry who believed elected members should pay for their own meals after the Council decided to introduce what he called "a sham Living Wage Policy". After a 7–6 vote, with Wallace voting in favour of retaining the meals, a public backlash engulfed the Council in controversy.

Wallace was defeated for the mayoralty by Labour Party councillor Campbell Barry at the 2019 local elections.

=== Post politics ===
Following his mayoral defeat he joined his wife Linda, working in real estate for Ray White.

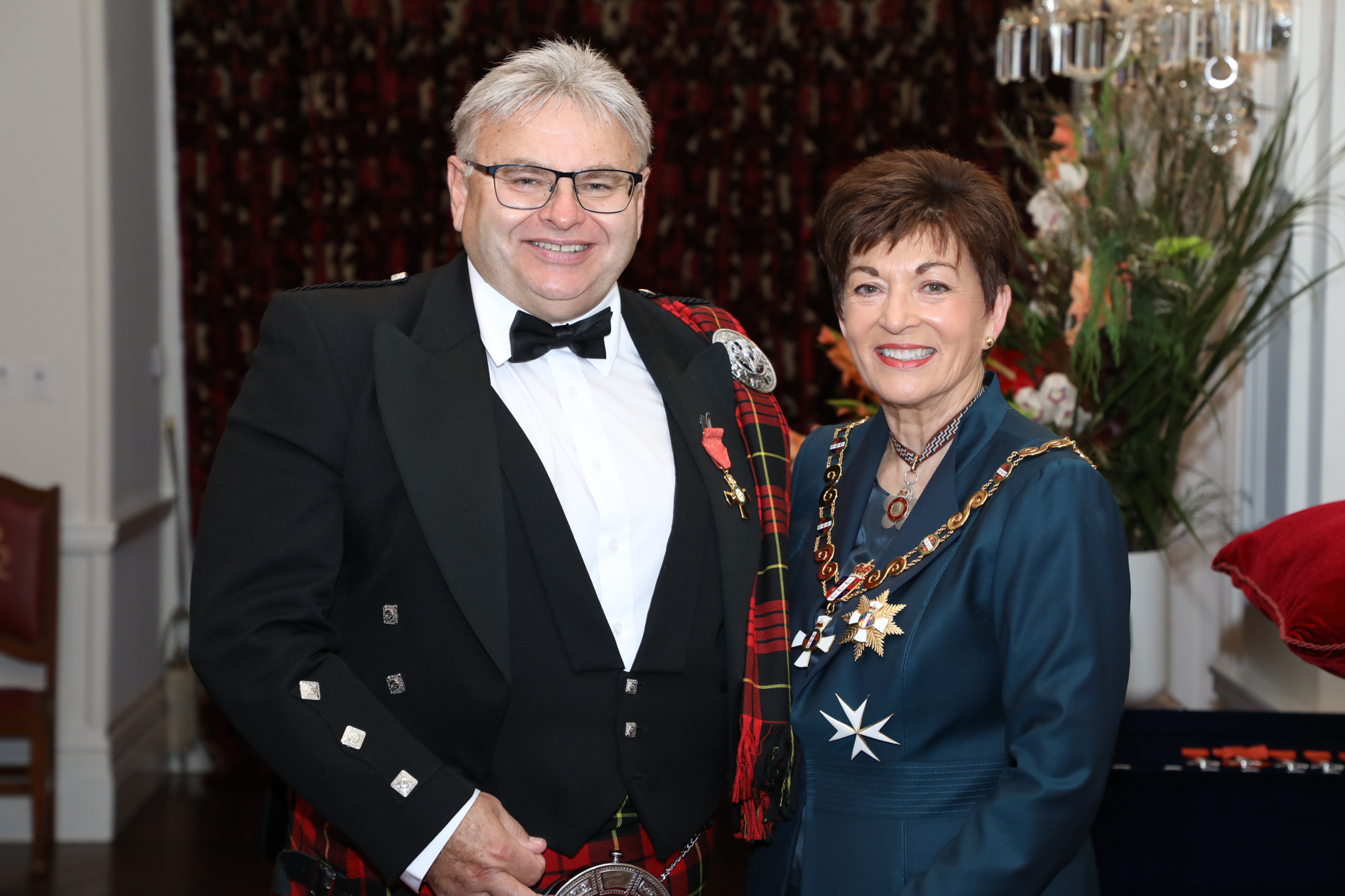
Wallace (left), after his investiture as an Officer of the New Zealand Order of Merit by the governor-general, Dame Patsy Reddy, at Government House, Wellington, on 6 May 2021

In the 2021 New Year Honours, Wallace was appointed an Officer of the New Zealand Order of Merit, for services to local government and the community.

Political offices
| Preceded by David Ogden | Mayor of Lower Hutt; 2010–2019 | Succeeded by Campbell Barry |
| Preceded by Pat Brosnan | Deputy Mayor of Lower Hutt; 2001–2004 | Succeeded by Roger Styles |
