= Mayor of Invercargill =

Head of Invercargill City Council in New Zealand

- Coat of arms of Invercargill

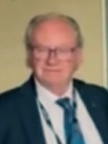
- Incumbent; Tom Campbell since 2025
- Style: His/Her Worship
- Appointer: Elected
- Term length: Three years, renewable
- Inaugural holder: William Wood
- Formation: 1871
- Salary: $149,291
- Website: Official website

The mayor of Invercargill is the head of the municipal government of Invercargill, New Zealand, and leads the Invercargill City Council. The mayor is directly elected using a First Past the Post electoral system every three years. The current mayor is Tom Campbell. Invercargill also has a deputy mayor that is chosen from the council. There have been 44 mayors so far.

== History ==
Invercargill was first proclaimed a municipality on 28 June 1871. On 26 August of that year, the first mayoral elections were held, and William Wood was elected as first mayor, defeating J.W. Mitchell by 191 to 140 votes. Unlike other municipalities, the mayor has always been elected "at large" (i.e., by the public), rather than (as for example in Christchurch) the councillors choosing one of their group.

Originally, mayoral elections were held on an annual basis. From 1915, mayors were elected for a two-year term; and, as of 1935, the mayoral term was extended to three years. There is an election in 2022.

When David Roche resigned the mayoralty in 1887, council appointed Aaron Blacke as mayor until an extraordinary election could be held. This was not done in strict accordance with the law, and Blacke is not included in official lists of Mayors of Invercargill.

Greater Invercargill was created on 10 January 1910 during Charles Stephen Longuet's reign. Longuet was succeeded by William Ott, who was twice elected unopposed and did not seek re-election in 1912.

Invercargill was proclaimed a city on 1 March 1930 during John D. Campbell's mayoralty.

There has been one female mayor so far – Eve Poole. A library building is named after Poole. She died in office in 1992. Tim Shadbolt ran in the resulting by-election and was elected. Shadbolt's 2010 election win was his 8th mayoral term and this made him longest-serving mayor in New Zealand (6 terms served in Invercargill).

=== Members of Parliament ===
Seven former mayors have also been Members of Parliament, and all of them represented the Invercargill electorate (the years in brackets give their term in Parliament):

- William Wood (1866–1870)
- John Cuthbertson (1873–1875)
- George Lumsden (1875–1878)
- James Walker Bain (1879–1881)
- Joseph Hatch (1884–1887)
- Josiah Hanan (1899–1925)
- Ralph Hanan (1946–1969)

== List of mayors of Invercargill ==
Invercargill has had 44 mayors so far:

	Name	Image	Term	Elections
1	William Wood		1871–1873	1871 • 1872
2	George Lumsden		1873–1874	1873
3	Thomas Pratt		1874–1875	1874
4	John Walker Mitchell		1875–1876	1875
5	John Cuthbertson		1876–1877	1876
6	Joseph Hatch		1877–1878	1877
(2)	George Lumsden (2nd period)		1878–1879	1878
7	George Goodwillie		1879–1880	1879
8	Nicholas Johnson		1880–1881	1880
9	Henry Jaggers		1881–1882	1881
10	John Kingsland		1882–1883	1882
11	William Sherriffs Moir		1883–1884	1883
12	George Froggatt		1884–1885	1884
13	John Lyon McDonald		1885–1886	1885
14	David Roche		1886–1887	1886
–	Aaron Blacke (Note: Note that Blacke is not included in official lists of mayors of Invercargill.)		1887	
15	Edwin Alfred Tapper		1887–1888	1887 by-election 1887
16	Thomas Fleming		1888–1889	1888
(4)	John Walker Mitchell (2nd period)		1889–1890	1889
17	William Horatio Hall		1890–1891	1890
18	James Walker Bain		1891–1892	1891
19	Duncan McFarlane		1892–1893	1892
20	Andrew Raeside		1893–1894	1893
21	William Benjamin Scandrett		1894–1895	1894
22	John Sinclair		1895–1896	1895
23	Josiah Hanan		1896–1897	1896
24	Hugh Mair		1897–1898	1897
25	John Stead		1898–1899	1898
26	James Smith Goldie		1899–1901	1899
27	Charles Stephen Longuet		1901–1903	1901 • 1902
(12)	George Froggatt (2nd period)		1903–1904	1903
(21)	William Benjamin Scandrett (2nd period)		1904–1909	1904 • 1905 • 1906; 1907 • 1908
(27)	Charles Stephen Longuet (2nd period)		1909–1910	1909
28	William Ott		1910–1912	1910 • 1911
(21)	William Benjamin Scandrett (3rd period)		1912–1913	1912
(19)	Duncan McFarlane (2nd period)		1913–1917	1913 • 1914 • 1915
(25)	John Stead (2nd period)		1917–1921	1917 • 1919
29	John F. Lillicrap		1921–1923	1921
30	Andrew Bain		1923–1927	1923 • 1925
31	John Miller		1927–1929	1927
32	John D. Campbell		1929–1931	1929
(31)	John Miller (2nd period)		1931–1938	1931 • 1933; 1935 • 1938
33	J. Ralph Hanan		1938–1941	1938 by-election
34	John Robert Martin		1941–1942	1941
35	Abraham Wachner		1942–1950	1942 by-election 1944 • 1947
36	William Aitchison		1950	
37	Brian Hewat		1950–1953	1950
38	Adam Adamson		1953–1962	1953 • 1956 • 1959
39	Neil Watson		1962–1971	1962 • 1965 • 1968
40	F. Russell Miller		1971–1983	1971 • 1974; 1977 • 1980
41	Eve Poole		1983–1992	1983 • 1986; 1989 • 1992
42	Tim Shadbolt		1993–1995	1993 by-election
43	David Harrington		1995–1998	1995
(42)	Tim Shadbolt (2nd period)		1998–2022	1998 • 2001 • 2004; 2007 • 2010 • 2013; 2016 • 2019
44	Nobby Clark		2022–2025	2022
45	Tom Campbell		2025–	2025

=== List of deputy mayors of Invercargill ===
Name	Term of office	Mayor
William Benjamin Scandrett	1902	Longuet
William Benjamin Scandrett	1911	Ott
John Stead	1915–1916	McFarlane
William Ott	1918–1919	Stead
John Matheson	1919	Stead
John Lillicrap	1919–1920	Stead
Thomas Daniel Lennie	1922–1923	Lillicrap
Alexander Glass	1924	Bain
Gordon Reed	1935–1938	J. Miller
Ralph Hanan	1938	J. Miller
John Robert Martin	1940–1941	Hanan
Abraham Wachner	1941–1942	Martin
William Aitchison	1944–1950	Wachner
Neil Watson	1953–1962	Adamson
Clive Faul	1962–1965	Watson
F. Russell Miller	1965–1971	Watson
Norman Jones	1971–1974	F. R. Miller
Eve Poole	1974–1980	F. R. Miller
Michael Deaker	1980–1983	F. R. Miller
Jim Fenton	1983–1986	Poole
Mark Winter	1986–1989	Poole
Bruce Pagan	1989–1992	Poole
Dougal Soper	1992–1995	Poole
Dougal Soper	1992–1995	Shadbolt
Mark Winter	1995–1998	Harrington
Neil Boniface	1998–2010	Shadbolt
Jackie Kruger	2010–2012	Shadbolt
Darren Ludlow	2012–2017	Shadbolt
Becs Amundsen	2017–2019	Shadbolt
Toni Biddle	2019–2020	Shadbolt
Nobby Clark	2020–2022	Shadbolt
Tom Campbell	2022–2025	Clark
Grant Dermody	2025–present	Campbell
