= 1913 Invercargill mayoral election =

1913 mayoral election in Invercargill, New Zealand

← 1912	30 April 1913	1914 →
- Turnout: 3,696
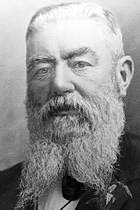

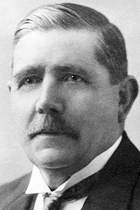
Candidate	Duncan McFarlane	Andrew Bain
Party	Independent	Independent
Popular vote	1,851	1,795
Percentage	50.08	48.56
Mayor before election
William Benjamin Scandrett
Elected mayor
Duncan McFarlane

The 1913 Invercargill mayoral election was held on 30 April 1913 as part of that year's local elections.

Former mayor Duncan McFarlane was elected again. His opponent, Andrew Bain, improved on his performance from the previous election but was still unsuccessful.

== Results ==
The following table gives the election results:

1913 Invercargill mayoral election
Party	Candidate	Votes	%	±%
Independent	Duncan McFarlane	1,851	50.08	
Independent	Andrew Bain	1,795	48.56	+10.71
Informal votes		50	1.35	+0.85
Majority		56	1.52	
Turnout		3,696		
