= 1921 Invercargill mayoral election =

1921 mayoral election in Invercargill, New Zealand

← 1919	27 April 1921	1923 →
- Turnout: 3,523
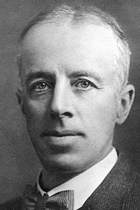

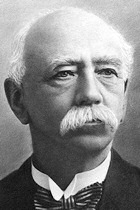
Candidate	John Lillicrap	John Stead
Party	Independent	Independent
Popular vote	2,143	1,380
Percentage	60.82	39.17
Mayor before election
John Stead
Elected mayor
John Lillicrap

The 1921 Invercargill mayoral election was held on 27 April 1921 as part of that year's local elections.

Incumbent mayor John Stead was defeated by councillor John Lillicrap.

== Results ==
The following table gives the election results:

1921 Invercargill mayoral election
Party	Candidate	Votes	%	±%
Independent	John Lillicrap	2,143	60.82	
Independent	John Stead	1,380	39.17	−12.07
Majority		763	21.5	
Turnout		3,523		
