= 1989 New Zealand local elections =

Local body elections in New Zealand

- 14 October 1989
- Regional council elections
- 170 regional councillors across 13 regions
- Territorial authority elections
- 1,003 local councillors across 73 territorial authorities
- Mayoral elections
- 73 mayors across 73 territorial authoritites

The 1989 New Zealand local elections were triennial elections held in New Zealand on Saturday 14 October 1989. They were the first local elections held after the 1989 New Zealand local government reforms, which saw hundreds of pre-existing councils and other local bodies consolidated together significantly.

== Election schedule ==
Key dates relating to the local elections were as follows:

2 September	Final possible day for returning officers to give public notice of location and closing date for candidate nominations.
8 September	Last day of candidate nominations and withdrawals, closed at noon. Unopposed candidates are declared nominated to office.
28 September–6 October	Postal ballots to be sent out where required.
14 October	Polling day – Polls open 9am to 7pm. Postal ballots must be returned to returning officer before poll close.
1 November	New councils come into existence, elected members take office.

== Background ==
=== Reforms ===
The Labour Party had reform of local government as one of its policies for the 1984 election, but did not give much detail; the proposals were developed during the first term of the Fourth Labour Government after the party won the election. Michael Bassett was Minister of Local Government and appointed a Local Government Commission, which was chaired by Brian Elwood from 1 April 1985 to 1 November 1992. The government gave the commission a guarantee that their findings would be treated as binding. The resulting local government reform was undertaken along the lines of marketisation, and was done in conjunction with neoliberal economic reforms known as Rogernomics. Some 850 entities were amalgamated into 86 local authorities on regional and territorial levels. Of the 850 entities, 249 were municipalities, and the remainder harbour boards, catchment boards, and drainage boards. The new authorities came into being on 1 November 1989, with the local politicians having been elected on 14 October. Brian Rudman, a journalist and editorial writer for The New Zealand Herald, called the reforms "revolutionary".

== Elections ==
=== Regional councils ===
The regional level of government in New Zealand is organised into areas controlled by regional councils.

Council	Electoral System	Seats	Councillors		Turnout	Details	Sources
Council	Electoral System	Seats	Previous	Result	Turnout	Details	Sources
Northland	FPP	12	? missing info	12 missing info			
Waikato	FPP	16	(new)	16 missing info			
Bay of Plenty	FPP	12	(new)	12 Independents			
Hawke's Bay	FPP	14	(new)	14 Independents			
Taranaki	FPP	11	(new)	11 Independents			
Manawatu-Wanganui	FPP	16	(new)	16 missing info			
Greater Wellington	FPP	19	7 Labour; 5 Citizens'; 3 Independents	9 Independents; 8 Citizens'; 2 Labour			
Nelson-Marlborough	FPP	13	(new)	13 Independents			
West Coast	FPP	10	(new)	10 Independents			
Canterbury	FPP	17	(new)	8 Independents; 4 United Citizens; 4 Labour; 1 Canterbury Action			
Otago	FPP	15	(new)	15 missing info			
Southland	FPP	15	(new)	15 missing info			
12 councils		170					

=== Territorial authorities ===
Council	Electoral System	Seats	Councillors		Turnout	Details	Sources
Council	Electoral System	Seats	Previous	Result	Turnout	Details	Sources
Far North	FPP	13	(new)	13 missing info			
Whangarei	FPP	13	(new)	13 missing info			
Kaipara	FPP	10	(new)	10 missing info			
Rodney	FPP	10	(new)	10 missing info			
Auckland City	FPP	24	15 Citizens & Ratepayers; 5 Labour; 1 Independents	17 Citizens & Ratepayers; 3 Labour; 3 Independents; 1 Community Independents	80,631	Details	
North Shore	FPP	18	(new)	9 Team North Harbour; 4 Shore Choice; 3 New City Team; 2 Independents			
Waitakere	FPP	16	(new)	10 Independent Residents & Ratepayers; 3 Waitakere United Community Coalition; 3 Independents			
Manukau	FPP	24	10 Independents; 6 Labour; 5 Residents & Ratepayers	12 Independents; 7 Residents & Ratepayers; 3 Progressive Independents; 2 Labour			
Papakura	FPP	12	12 Citizens Action	12 Citizens Action			
Franklin	FPP	14	(new)	14 missing info			
Thames-Coromandel	FPP	13	? missing info	13 missing info			
Hauraki	FPP	12	(new)	12 Independents			
Waikato	FPP	14	(new)	14 Independents			
Matamata-Piako	FPP	12	(new)	12 Independents			
Hamilton	FPP	17	? missing info	17 Independents			
Waipa	FPP	13	(new)	13 missing info			
South Waikato	FPP	14	(new)	14 missing info			
Otorohanga	FPP	10	? missing info	10 missing info			
Waitomo	FPP	10	(new)	10 Independents			
Taupo	FPP	15 (Note: Only 2 were up for election, rest elected October 1988)	10 Independents	15 missing info			
Western Bay of Plenty	FPP	12	(new)	12 missing info			
Tauranga	FPP	14	? missing info	14 Independents			
Opotiki	FPP	10	(new)	10 Independents			
Whakatane	FPP	15	(new)	15 missing info			
Rotorua	FPP	16	(new)	16 Independents			
Kawerau	FPP	10	(new)	10 Independents			
Gisborne	FPP	16	12 Independents	16 Independents			
Wairoa	FPP	9	11 Independents	9 Independents			
Napier	FPP	12	12 Independents	12 missing info			
Hastings	FPP	14	12 Independents	14 missing info			
Central Hawke's Bay	FPP	12	(new)	12 Independents			
New Plymouth	FPP	16	16 Independents	16 Independents			
Stratford	FPP	12 (Note: Election held 28 March 1989)	9 Independents	12 (Note: Election held 28 March 1989) missing info			
South Taranaki	FPP	12	(new)	12 missing info			
Ruapehu	FPP	14	(new)	14 Independents			
Rangitikei	FPP	11	(new)	11 Independents			
Wanganui	FPP	14	12 Independents	14 Independents			
Manawatu	FPP	13	(new)	13 missing info			
Palmerston North	FPP	15	14 Independents	15 Independents			
Tararua	FPP	12	(new)	12 missing info			
Horowhenua	FPP	12	8 Independents	12 missing info			
Masterton	FPP	15	11 Independents	15 Independents			
Kapiti Coast	FPP	14	5 Independents; 4 Residents & Ratepayers	9 Independents; 3 Kapiti Coast Independents; 2 Residents & Ratepayers			
Carterton	FPP	12	9 Independents	12 Independents			
South Wairarapa	FPP	10	(new)	10 Independents			
Upper Hutt	FPP	12	9 Independents	12 Independents			
Porirua	FPP	13	8 Labour; 7 Independents; 1 Values	7 Labour; 6 Independents	12,078	Details	
Lower Hutt	FPP	15	14 United Citizens; 2 Labour	12 United Citizens; 3 Independents			
Wellington	FPP	21	11 Labour; 9 Citizens'; 1 Independents	9 Citizens'; 7 Labour; 4 Independents; 1 Green Alternative	48,060 (45.80%)	Details	
Tasman	FPP	16 (Note: Only 2 were up for election)	(new)	16 (Note: Only 2 were up for election) missing info			
Nelson	FPP	14	13 Independents; 1 Values	14 Independents	(70.0%)		
Marlborough	FPP	17	(new)	17 Independents	(73.8%)		
Kaikoura	FPP	7	(new)	7 Independents	(84.0%)		
Buller	FPP	11	(new)	11 Independents	(77.3%)		
Grey	FPP	12	(new)	12 Independents	(75.0%)		
Westland	FPP	12	(new)	12 Independents	(71.0%)		
Hurunui	FPP	9	(new)	9 Independents	(80.0%)		
Selwyn	FPP	13	(new)	13 Independents	(70.0%)		
Waimakariri	FPP	13	(new)	13 Independents	(65.0%)		
Christchurch	FPP	24	8 Citizens; 6 Labour	8 Labour; 7 United Citizens; 6 Christchurch Action; 2 IPW; 1 Independents	(60.0%)		
Banks Peninsula	FPP	10	(new)	6 Independents; 4 Independent Peninsula Team	(73.0%)		
Ashburton	FPP	18	(new)	18 Independents	(76.4%)		
Mackenzie	FPP	10	(new)	10 Independents			
Timaru	FPP	16	(new)	16 Independents			
Waimate	FPP	13	? missing info	13 missing info			
Waitaki	FPP	14	(new)	14 Independents			
Queenstown-Lakes	FPP	15	(new)	15 missing info			
Central Otago	FPP	15	(new)	15 missing info			
Dunedin	FPP	21	7 Citizens; 4 Labour; 1 Independents	21 missing info			
Clutha	FPP	15	(new)	15 missing info			
Southland	FPP	15	(new)	15 missing info			
Gore	FPP	11	(new)	11 missing info			
Invercargill	FPP	15	12 missing info	15 missing info			
73 councils		1003					

=== Mayors ===
All territorial authorities (including the one unitary authority) directly elected mayors.

Territorial authority	Incumbent (Note: Incumbents here are generally the mayors of pre-existing bodies that occupied a similar geographic area; most councils were newly formed in 1989)	Elected	Runner-up	Details	Sources
Far North	(Ind)	Miljenko Srhoj (Ind)	? (Ind)		
Whangarei	Joyce Ryan (Ind)	Stan Semenoff (Ind)	Joyce Ryan (Ind)		
Kaipara	(Ind)	Peter Brown (Ind)	? (Ind)		
Rodney	(Ind)	Gordon Mason (Ind)	? (Ind)		
Auckland City	Catherine Tizard (Ind)		Malcolm Moses (Ind)	Details	
North Shore	(Ind)	Ann Hartley (Ind)	Wyn Hoadley (Ind)		
Waitakere	(Ind)	Assid Corban (Ind)	Tim Shadbolt (Ind)		
Manukau	Barry Curtis (Ind)		Dan Davis (Ind)		
Papakura	George Hawkins (Ind)		unopposed		
Franklin	(Ind)	Max Short (Ind)	? (Ind)		
Thames-Coromandel	John Campbell (Ind)	Alasdair Thompson (Ind)	? (Ind)		
Hauraki	(Ind)	Basil Morrison (Ind)	? (Ind)		
Waikato	(Ind)	Angus Macdonald (Ind)	? (Ind)		
Matamata-Piako	(Ind)	Ken Thomas (Ind)	? (Ind)		
Hamilton	Ross Jansen (Ind)	Margaret Evans (Ind)	? (Ind)		
Waipa	(Ind)	Bruce Berquist (Ind)	? (Ind)		
South Waikato	(Ind)	Gordon Blake (Ind)	? (Ind)		
Otorohanga	? (Ind)	? (Ind)	? (Ind)		
Waitomo	? (Ind)	Les Munro (Ind)	? (Ind)		
Taupō	Joan Williamson (Ind)		? (Ind)		
Western Bay of Plenty	(Ind)	Michael Parke-Pittar (Ind)	Harold Cameron (Ind)		
Tauranga	Noel Pope (Ind)	Keith 'Nobby' Clarke (Ind)	Noel Pope (Ind)		
Opotiki	? (Ind)	Don Riesterer (Ind)	Preston Craig (Ind)		
Whakatane	Bob Byrne (Ind)	Lorraine Brill (Ind)	? (Ind)		
Rotorua	John Keaney (Ind)		? (Ind)		
Kawerau	Lyn Hartley (Ind)		unopposed		
Gisborne	Hink Healey (Ind)	John Clarke (Ind)	Brian Cranshaw (Ind)		
Wairoa	Cliff Owen (Ind)		unopposed		
Hastings	Jeremy Dwyer (Ind)		James Fargo (Ind)		
Napier	Dave Prebensen (Ind)	Alan Dick (Ind)	Harry Lawson (Ind)		
Central Hawke's Bay	(Ind)	Hugh Hamilton (Ind)	Robert Yeoman (Ind)		
New Plymouth	David Lean (Ind)		Ian Lobb (Ind)		
Stratford	Lachlan Grant Bond (Ind)	David Walter (Ind)	? (Ind)		
South Taranaki	(Ind)	Pierce Joyce (Ind)	Henry Johnston (Ind)		
Ruapehu	(Ind)	Garrick Workman (Ind)	Terrence Podmore (Ind)		
Rangitikei	(Ind)	John Wilson (Ind)	Basil McLean (Ind)		
Wanganui	Chas Poynter (Ind)		John Blaikie (Ind)		
Manawatu	Caryll Clausen (Ind)		William Abiss (Ind)		
Palmerston North	Paul Rieger (Ind)		unopposed		
Tararua	(Ind)	Bob Trotter (Ind)	Chester Burt (Ind)		
Horowhenua	Malcolm Guy (Ind)		Horace Sciasia (Ind)		
Masterton	Bob Francis (Ind)		Rod McKenzie (Ind)		
Kapiti Coast	Iver Trask (Ind)		Ernie Gates (Ind)		
Carterton	Barry Keys (Ind)		unopposed		
South Wairarapa	(Ind)	John Garrity (Ind)	Dana Geleninding (Ind)		
Upper Hutt	Rex Kirton (Ind)		Ralph Miller (Ind)		
Porirua	John Burke (Ind)		Ken Mair (Ind)	Details	
Lower Hutt	Glen Evans (Ind)		Ted Woolf (Ind)	Details	
Wellington	Jim Belich (Ind)		Helene Ritchie (Ind)	Details	
Tasman	(Ind)	Kerry Marshall (Ind)	? (Ind)		
Nelson	Peter Malone (Ind)		Mike Ward (Ind)		
Marlborough	(Ind)	Leo McKendry (Ind)	Malcolm Dick (Ind)		
Kaikoura	(Ind)	Thomas Burgin (Ind)	Jim Abernethy (Ind)		
Buller	(Ind)	Pat O'Dea (Ind)	Roger Brookes (Ind)		
Grey	Barry Dallas (Ind)		D J Truman (Ind)		
Westland	(Ind)	Durham Havill (Ind)	H Pierson (Ind)		
Hurunui	(Ind)	John Chaffey (Ind)	Wyndham Gray (Ind)		
Selwyn	(Ind)	Ann Hurford (Ind)	Jim Baker (Ind)		
Waimakariri	(Ind)	Trevor Inch (Ind)	Hec McCallistor (Ind)		
Christchurch	Hamish Hay (Ind)	Vicki Buck (Ind)	Morgan Fahey (Ind)	Details	
Banks Peninsula	(Ind)	Terence Brocherie (Ind)	Bryon Porteous (Ind)		
Ashburton	Geoff Geering (Ind)		Stuart Ellis (Ind)		
Mackenzie	(Ind)	Bruce Scott (Ind)	unopposed		
Timaru	Dave Walker (Ind)	Archie Houstoun (Ind)	Ray Bennett (Ind)		
Waimate	David Owen (Ind)		? (Ind)		
Waitaki	(Ind)	Reg Denny (Ind)	William McKerrow (Ind)		
Queenstown-Lakes	John Davies (Ind)	David Bradford (Ind)	John Davies (Ind)		
Central Otago	(Ind)	Bill McIntosh (Ind)	Duncan Butcher (Ind)		
Dunedin	Cliff Skeggs (Ind)	Richard Walls (Ind)	Ian McKeeking (Ind)	Details	
Clutha	(Ind)	Keith Fyall (Ind)	Cyril Hayes (Ind)		
Southland	(Ind)	John Casey (Ind)	Frana Grace Cardno (Ind)		
Gore	Gabriel Farry (Ind)	Ian Tulloch (Ind)	Gabriel Farry (Ind)		
Invercargill	Eve Poole (Ind)		Bruce Pagan (Ind)	Details	

=== Area Health Boards ===
Council	Electoral System	Seats	Control		Turnout	Details	Sources
Council	Electoral System	Seats	Previous	Result	Turnout	Details	Sources
Northland	FPP	10	12 missing info	10 missing info			
Auckland	FPP	12	(new)	6 missing info; 3 Citizens & Ratepayers; 2 Team North Harbour; 1 Health Alliance			
Waikato	FPP	10	(new)	10 missing info			
Bay of Plenty	FPP	10	(new)	10 Independents			
Tairawhiti	FPP	8	(new)	8 missing info			
Hawke's Bay	FPP	10	(new)	10 Independents			
Taranaki	FPP	10	14 missing info	10 Independents			
Manawatu-Wanganui	FPP	10	(new)	10 missing info			
Wellington	FPP	10	(new)	4 Independents; 4 Citizens'; 2 Labour			
Nelson-Marlborough	FPP	9	(new)	9 Independents			
West Coast	FPP	8	(new)	8 Independents			
Canterbury	FPP	11	(new)	6 Independents; 3 United Citizens; 2 Labour			
Otago	FPP	10	(new)	10 missing info			
Southland	FPP	10	(new)	10 missing info			
14 boards		138					
