= 1915 Invercargill mayoral election =

1915 mayoral election in Invercargill, New Zealand

← 1914	28 April 1915	1917 →
- Turnout: 4,803 (50.78%)
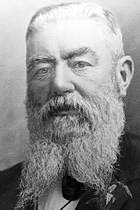

Candidate	Duncan McFarlane	Arthur Brian Haggitt
Party	Independent	Independent
Popular vote	2,617	1,894
Percentage	54.48	39.43
Mayor before election
Duncan McFarlane
Elected mayor
Duncan McFarlane

The 1915 Invercargill mayoral election was held on 28 April 1915 as part of that year's local elections. This was the first election for a biennial term.

Incumbent mayor Duncan McFarlane was re-elected with a reduced majority to a third consecutive term.

== Results ==
The following table gives the election results:

1915 Invercargill mayoral election
Party	Candidate	Votes	%	±%
Independent	Duncan McFarlane	2,617	54.48	−4.05
Independent	Arthur Brian Haggitt	1,894	39.43	
Independent	Robert Barbour McKay	237	4.93	
Majority		723	15.05	−2.01
Informal votes		55	1.14	
Turnout		4,803	50.78	+2.70
