= 1889 Invercargill mayoral election =

1889 mayoral election in Invercargill, New Zealand

| ← 1888 | 27 November 1889 | 1890 → |
- Turnout: 394
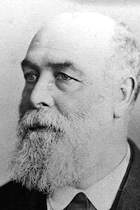
| Candidate | John Walker Mitchell | James Mackintosh |
| Party | Independent | Independent |
| Popular vote | 234 | 160 |
| Percentage | 59.39 | 40.61 |
Mayor before election
Thomas Fleming
Elected mayor
John Walker Mitchell

The 1889 Invercargill mayoral election was held on 27 November 1889.

Former mayor John Walker Mitchell defeated James Mackintosh.

== Results ==
The following table gives the election results:

1889 Invercargill mayoral election
| Party | Candidate | Votes | % | ±% |
|---|---|---|---|---|
| Independent | John Walker Mitchell | 234 | 59.39 | |
| Independent | James Mackintosh | 160 | 40.61 | |
| Majority | | 74 | 18.78 | |
| Turnout | | 394 | | |
