= Brian Hewat =

New Zealand barrister and politician

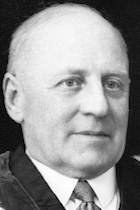

37th Mayor of Invercargill
- In office 1950–1953

Personal details
- Born: 1894 Oamaru, New Zealand
- Died: 28 February 1970 (aged 75) Invercargill, New Zealand
- Spouse: Brenda Humphries (m. 1920)
- Children: 2
- Education: University of Otago
- Military career
- Allegiance: New Zealand
- Branch: New Zealand Army
- Service number: 9/1305
- Commands: Invercargill Battalion
- Conflicts: World War I World War II

Brian Wilfred Hewat (1894 – 28 February 1970) was a New Zealand barrister and politician who served as the mayor of Invercargill from 1950 to 1953.

== Biography ==
Hewat was born in Oamaru in 1894. He attended Waitaki Boys' High School and the University of Otago, where he achieved a Bachelor of Laws. During World War I he served with the Otago Mounted Rifles Regiment in Gallipoli and France. After the war, he started a law practice in Invercargill and married Brenda Humphries in 1920. He served one term on the Invercargill City Council from 1933 to 1935. During World War II, he was commander of the Invercargill Battalion of the Home Guard.

In 1950, Hewat intended to challenge incumbent mayor William Aitchison, who had been serving since the death of Abraham Wachner in August. However, Aitchison withdrew his nomination on 7 November and Hewat was elected mayor unopposed. He ran for re-election in the 1953 mayoral election, but was defeated by councillor Adam Adamson. That same year, Hewat was awarded the Queen Elizabeth II Coronation Medal.

Hewat died in Invercargill on 28 February 1970 and is buried in the St John's Cemetery.

Political offices
Preceded by William Aitchison	Mayor of Invercargill; 1950–1953	Succeeded by Adam Adamson
