= 1890 Invercargill mayoral election =

Mayoral election in Invercargill, New Zealand

← 1889	26 November 1890	1891 →
- Turnout: 416
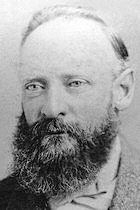
Candidate	William Horatio Hall	James Mackintosh	W.H. Mathieson
Party	Independent	Independent	Independent
Popular vote	253	140	23
Percentage	60.81	33.65	5.52
Mayor before election
John Walker Mitchell
Elected mayor
William Horatio Hall

The 1890 Invercargill mayoral election was held on 26 November 1890.

== Results ==
The following table gives the election results:

1890 Invercargill mayoral election
Party	Candidate	Votes	%	±%
Independent	William Horatio Hall	253	60.81	
Independent	James Mackintosh	140	33.65	−6.96
Independent	William Hunter Mathieson	23	5.52	
Majority		113	27.16	
Turnout		416		
