= 1909 Invercargill mayoral election =

1909 mayoral election in Invercargill, New Zealand

← 1908	29 April 1909	1910 →
- Turnout: 2,087
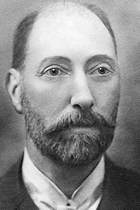

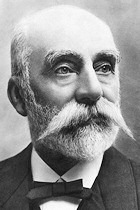
Candidate	Charles Stephen Longuet	William Benjamin Scandrett
Party	Independent	Independent
Popular vote	1,162	911
Percentage	55.67	43.65
Mayor before election
William Benjamin Scandrett
Elected mayor
Charles Stephen Longuet

The 1909 Invercargill mayoral election was held on 29 April 1909 as part of that year's local elections.

Former mayor Charles Stephen Longuet was elected again, ending the long second reign of William Benjamin Scandrett.

== Results ==
The following table gives the election results:

1909 Invercargill mayoral election
Party	Candidate	Votes	%	±%
Independent	Charles Stephen Longuet	1,162	55.67	
Independent	William Benjamin Scandrett	911	43.65	−11.07
Informal votes		14	0.67	+0.10
Majority		251	12.02	
Turnout		2,087		
