= 1893 Invercargill mayoral election =

1893 mayoral election in Invercargill, New Zealand

← 1892	29 November 1893	1894 →
- Turnout: 571
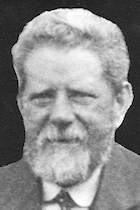

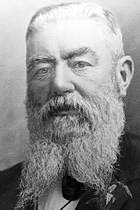
Candidate	Andrew Raeside	Aaron Blacke	Duncan McFarlane
Party	Independent	Independent	Independent
Popular vote	225	180	126
Percentage	39.40	31.52	22.06
Mayor before election
Duncan McFarlane
Elected mayor
Andrew Raeside

The 1893 Invercargill mayoral election was held on 29 November 1893 as part of that year's local elections.

Incumbent mayor Duncan McFarlane was defeated, coming third behind Andrew Raeside and former unofficial mayor Aaron Blacke.

== Results ==
The following table gives the election results:

1893 Invercargill mayoral election
Party	Candidate	Votes	%	±%
Independent	Andrew Raeside	225	39.40	
Independent	Aaron Blacke	180	31.52	
Independent	Duncan McFarlane	126	22.06	−34.47
Independent	Storie	40	7.00	
Majority		45	7.88	
Turnout		571		
