= 1938 Invercargill mayoral by-election =

1938 by-election in Invercargill, New Zealand

- 19 October 1938
- Turnout: 7,414
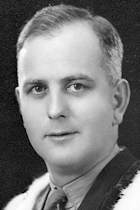

Candidate	Ralph Hanan	Hugh Ritchie	Herbert Farrant
Party	Independent	Independent	Labour
Popular vote	4,202	1,649	1,563
Percentage	56.67	22.24	21.08
Mayor before election
Ralph Hanan (acting)
Elected mayor
Ralph Hanan

The 1938 Invercargill mayoral by-election was held on 19 October 1938 to elect the Mayor of Invercargill after the death of John Miller on 20 September. Miller had been elected to a fourth consecutive term in May.

== Background ==
Ralph Hanan was elected to council in 1935 and became deputy mayor in May 1938.

== Results ==
The following table gives the election results:

1938 Invercargill mayoral by-election
Party	Candidate	Votes	%	±%
Independent	Ralph Hanan	4,202	56.67	
Independent	Hugh Ritchie	1,649	22.24	
Labour	Herbert James Farrant	1,563	21.08	
Majority		2,553	34.43	
Turnout		7,414		
