= 1907 Invercargill mayoral election =

1907 mayoral election in Invercargill, New Zealand

← 1906	25 April 1907	1908 →
- Turnout: 1,580
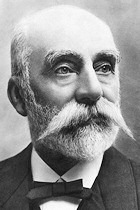

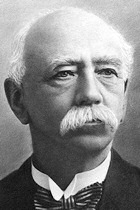
Candidate	William Benjamin Scandrett	John Stead
Party	Independent	Independent
Popular vote	1,044	520
Percentage	66.07	32.91
Mayor before election
William Benjamin Scandrett
Elected mayor
William Benjamin Scandrett

The 1907 Invercargill mayoral election was held on 25 April 1907 as part of that year's local elections.

Incumbent mayor William Benjamin Scandrett was re-elected to a fourth consecutive term, defeating former mayor John Stead.

== Results ==
The following table gives the election results:

1907 Invercargill mayoral election
Party	Candidate	Votes	%	±%
Independent	William Benjamin Scandrett	1,044	66.07	
Independent	John Stead	520	32.91	
Informal votes		16	1.01	
Majority		524	33.16	
Turnout		1,580		
