= 1983 Invercargill mayoral election =

1983 mayoral election in Invercargill, New Zealand

- 8 October 1983
- Turnout: 13,432
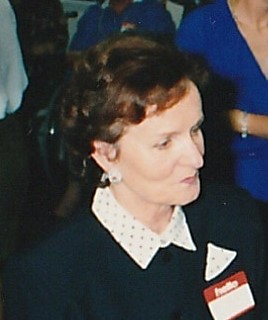
Candidate	Eve Poole	John Russell	Jim Fenton
Party	Independent	Independent	Independent
Popular vote	7,631	4,525	1,276
Percentage	56.81	33.68	9.50
Mayor before election
F. Russell Miller
Elected mayor
Eve Poole

The 1983 Invercargill mayoral election was held on 8 October 1983 as part of the 1983 New Zealand local elections, and was conducted under the First Past the Post system.

After her loss at the previous election, former deputy mayor Eve Poole defeated incumbent councillors John Russell and Jim Fenton, thus becoming the first female Mayor of Invercargill.

== Results ==
The following table gives the election results:

1983 Invercargill mayoral election
Party	Candidate	Votes	%	±%
Independent	Eve Poole	7,631	56.81	+9.23
Independent	John Russell	4,525	33.68	
Independent	Jim Fenton	1,276	9.50	
Majority		3,106	23.13	
Turnout		13,432		
