= 1894 Invercargill mayoral election =

1894 mayoral election in Invercargill, New Zealand

← 1893	28 November 1894	1895 →
- Turnout: 608
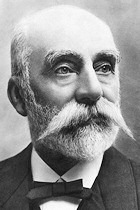

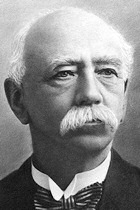
Candidate	William Benjamin Scandrett	John Stead
Party	Independent	Independent
Popular vote	447	161
Percentage	73.52	26.48
Mayor before election
Andrew Raeside
Elected mayor
William Benjamin Scandrett

The 1894 Invercargill mayoral election was held on 28 November 1894 as part of that year's local elections.

== Results ==
The following table gives the election results:

1894 Invercargill mayoral election
Party	Candidate	Votes	%	±%
Independent	William Benjamin Scandrett	447	73.52	
Independent	John Stead	161	26.48	
Majority		286	47.04	
Turnout		608		
