= 1931 Invercargill mayoral election =

1931 mayoral election in Invercargill, New Zealand

- 6 May 1931
- Turnout: 6,688
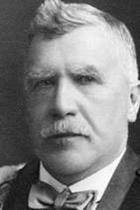

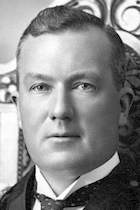
| Candidate | John Miller | John D. Campbell |
| Party | Independent | Independent |
| Popular vote | 3,366 | 3,322 |
| Percentage | 50.32 | 49.67 |
Mayor before election
John D. Campbell
Elected mayor
John Miller

The 1931 Invercargill mayoral election was part of the New Zealand local elections held that same year. The polling was conducted using the standard first-past-the-post electoral method.

Incumbent mayor John D. Campbell was narrowly defeated by the former mayor John Miller.

== Results ==
The following table gives the election results:

1931 Invercargill mayoral election
| Party | Candidate | Votes | % | ±% |
|---|---|---|---|---|
| Independent | John Miller | 3,366 | 50.32 | +10.74 |
| Independent | John D. Campbell | 3,322 | 49.67 | −10.74 |
| Majority | | 44 | 0.65 | |
| Turnout | | 6,688 | | |
