= 1933 Invercargill mayoral election =

1933 mayoral election in Invercargill, New Zealand

- 3 May 1933
- Turnout: 8,592
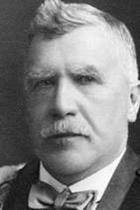

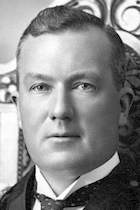
Candidate	John Miller	John D. Campbell
Party	Independent	Independent
Popular vote	5,413	3,179
Percentage	63	37
Mayor before election
John Miller
Elected mayor
John Miller

The 1933 Invercargill mayoral election was part of the New Zealand local elections held that same year. The polling was conducted using the standard first-past-the-post electoral method. This was the final mayoral election for a biennial term, future terms would be triennial.

Incumbent mayor John Miller defeated former mayor John D. Campbell again for his second consecutive term, the third in total.

== Results ==
The following table gives the election results:

1933 Invercargill mayoral election
Party	Candidate	Votes	%	±%
Independent	John Miller	5,413	63	+12.68
Independent	John D. Campbell	3,179	37	−12.68
Majority		2,234	26	+25.35
Turnout		8,592		
