= 1944 Invercargill mayoral election =

1944 mayoral election in Invercargill, New Zealand

← 1942	27 May 1944	1947 →
- Turnout: 9,591
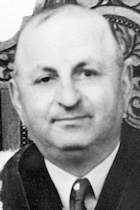
Candidate	Abraham Wachner	A. W. Jones
Party	Independent	Independent
Popular vote	7,321	2,270
Percentage	76.33	23.66
Mayor before election
Abraham Wachner
Elected mayor
Abraham Wachner

The 1944 Invercargill mayoral election was part of the New Zealand local elections held that same year. The polling was conducted using the standard first-past-the-post electoral method.

Incumbent mayor Abraham Wachner was re-elected with an increased majority.

== Results ==
The following table gives the election results:

1944 Invercargill mayoral election
Party	Candidate	Votes	%	±%
Independent	Abraham Wachner	7,321	76.33	+15.04
Independent	A. W. Jones	2,270	23.66	
Majority		5,051	52.67	+30.08
Turnout		9,591		
