= 1899 Invercargill mayoral election =

1899 mayoral election in Invercargill, New Zealand

- 29 November 1899
- Turnout: 691 (58.16%)
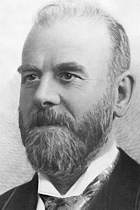

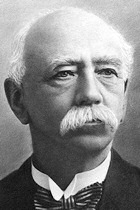
Candidate	James Smith Goldie	John Stead
Party	Independent	Independent
Popular vote	365	326
Percentage	52.82	47.17
Mayor before election
John Stead
Elected mayor
James Smith Goldie

The 1899 Invercargill mayoral election was held on 29 November 1899 as part of that year's local elections. Voting booths were provided in each ward for the first time.

Incumbent mayor John Stead was defeated by councillor James Smith Goldie.

== Results ==
The following table gives the election results:

1899 Invercargill mayoral election
Party	Candidate	Votes	%	±%
Independent	James Smith Goldie	365	52.82	
Independent	John Stead	326	47.17	−32.48
Majority		39	5.65	
Turnout		691	58.16	
