= 1938 Invercargill mayoral election =

1938 mayoral election in Invercargill, New Zealand

- 11 May 1938
- Turnout: 7,728
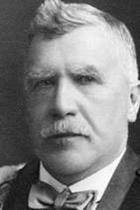
Candidate	John Miller	Gordon Reed
Party	Independent	Independent
Popular vote	6,184	1,544
Percentage	80.02	19.97
Mayor before election
John Miller
Elected mayor
John Miller

The 1938 Invercargill mayoral election was part of the New Zealand local elections held that same year. The polling was conducted using the standard first-past-the-post electoral method.

Incumbent mayor John Miller sought a fourth consecutive term, the fifth in total, against deputy mayor Gordon Reed. Miller died on 20 September, resulting in a by-election in October.

== Background ==
Miller and Reed had previously run against one another for Invercargill in the 1935 general election, both losing to William Denham.

== Results ==
The following table gives the election results:

1938 Invercargill mayoral election
Party	Candidate	Votes	%	±%
Independent	John Miller	6,184	80.02	
Independent	Gordon Reed	1,544	19.97	
Majority		4,640	60.05	
Turnout		7,728		
