= 1953 Invercargill mayoral election =

1953 mayoral election in Invercargill, New Zealand

- 31 October 1953
- Turnout: 7,882
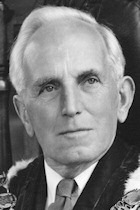

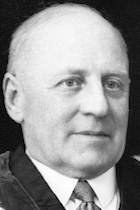
Candidate	Adam Adamson	Brian Hewat
Party	Independent	Independent
Popular vote	4,076	3,806
Percentage	51.72	48.28
Mayor before election
Brian Hewat
Elected mayor
Adam Adamson

The 1953 Invercargill mayoral election was part of the New Zealand local elections held that same year. The polling was conducted using the standard first-past-the-post electoral method.

== Background ==
A major talking point in the lead up to the election was the potential of a clash with the 1953 Royal Tour. There were proposals to postpone local elections until early 1954 over fears of reduced turnout due to a conflicted schedule. The proposals were considered by the Minister of Internal Affairs William Bodkin, who ultimately decided against it.

The one-term incumbent mayor Brian Hewat sought another term but was defeated for the position in a challenge from three-term Invercargill Borough Councillor Adam Adamson.

== Results ==
The following table gives the election results:

1953 Invercargill mayoral election
Party	Candidate	Votes	%	±%
Independent	Adam Adamson	4,076	51.72	
Independent	Brian Hewat	3,806	48.28	
Majority		270	3.42	
Turnout		7,882		
