= 1929 Invercargill mayoral election =

1929 mayoral election in Invercargill, New Zealand

- 1 May 1929
- Turnout: 5,232
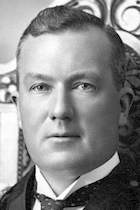

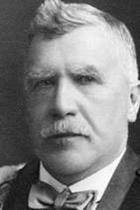
Candidate	John D. Campbell	John Miller
Party	Independent	Independent
Popular vote	3,161	2,071
Percentage	60.41	39.58
Mayor before election
John Miller
Elected mayor
John D. Campbell

The 1929 Invercargill mayoral election was part of the New Zealand local elections held that same year. The polling was conducted using the standard first-past-the-post electoral method.

Incumbent mayor John Miller was defeated by councillor John D. Campbell.

== Results ==
The following table gives the election results:

1929 Invercargill mayoral election
Party	Candidate	Votes	%	±%
Independent	John D. Campbell	3,161	60.41	
Independent	John Miller	2,071	39.58	−33.73
Majority		1,090	20.83	
Turnout		5,232		
