= 1971 Invercargill mayoral election =

1971 mayoral election in Invercargill, New Zealand

- 9 October 1971
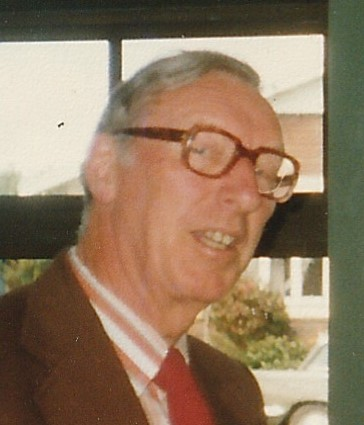
| Candidate | F. Russell Miller | F. W. Harvey |
| Party | Independent | Independent |
| Popular vote | 8,279 | 1,805 |
| Percentage | 82.10 | 17.89 |
Mayor before election
Neil Watson
Elected mayor
F. Russell Miller

The 1971 Invercargill mayoral election was part of the New Zealand local elections held that same year. The polling was conducted using the standard first-past-the-post electoral method. Deputy mayor F. Russell Miller was elected mayor, defeating fellow councillor F. W. Harvey. Harvey was also unsuccessful in retaining his council position.

== Results ==
The following table gives the election results:

1971 Invercargill mayoral election
| Party | Candidate | Votes | % | ±% |
|---|---|---|---|---|
| Independent | F. Russell Miller | 8,279 | 82.10 | |
| Independent | F. W. Harvey | 1,805 | 17.89 | |
| Majority | | 6,474 | 64.21 | |
| Turnout | | 10,084 | | |
