= 1942 Invercargill mayoral by-election =

1942 mayoral election in Invercargill, New Zealand

← 1941	22 June 1942	1944 →
- Turnout: 4,785
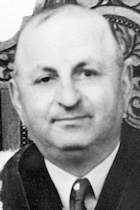
Candidate	Abraham Wachner	J. Pickard
Party	Independent	Independent
Popular vote	2,933	1,852
Percentage	61.29	38.70
Mayor before election
Abraham Wachner (acting)
Elected mayor
Abraham Wachner

The 1942 Invercargill mayoral by-election was held on 22 June 1942 to elect the Mayor of Invercargill after the resignation of John Robert Martin due to illness on 26 May.

== Background ==
Abraham Wachner was elected to council in 1938 and became deputy mayor in 1941.

== Results ==
The following table gives the election results:

1942 Invercargill mayoral by-election
Party	Candidate	Votes	%	±%
Independent	Abraham Wachner	2,933	61.29	
Independent	J. Pickard	1,852	38.70	
Majority		1,081	22.59	
Turnout		4,785		
