= 1896 Invercargill mayoral election =

1896 mayoral election in Invercargill, New Zealand

- 25 November 1896
- Turnout: 617
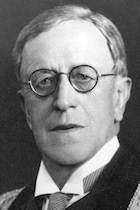

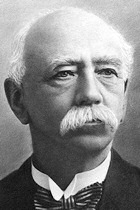
Candidate	Josiah Hanan	John Stead
Party	Independent	Independent
Popular vote	358	259
Percentage	58.02	41.98
Mayor before election
John Sinclair
Elected mayor
Josiah Hanan

The 1896 Invercargill mayoral election was held on 25 November 1896 as part of that year's local elections.

Councillor Josiah Hanan defeated fellow councillor, John Stead.

== Results ==
The following table gives the election results:

1896 Invercargill mayoral election
Party	Candidate	Votes	%	±%
Independent	Josiah Hanan	358	58.02	
Independent	John Stead	259	41.98	
Majority		99	16.04	
Turnout		617		
