= 1908 Invercargill mayoral election =

1908 mayoral election in Invercargill, New Zealand

← 1907	29 April 1908	1909 →
- Turnout: 1,917
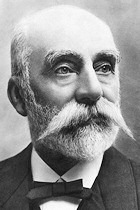

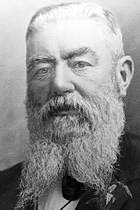
Candidate	William Benjamin Scandrett	Duncan McFarlane
Party	Independent	Independent
Popular vote	1,049	857
Percentage	54.72	44.70
Mayor before election
William Benjamin Scandrett
Elected mayor
William Benjamin Scandrett

The 1908 Invercargill mayoral election was held on 29 April 1908 as part of that year's local elections.

Incumbent mayor William Benjamin Scandrett was re-elected for his fifth consecutive term, with a reduced majority. He defeated former mayor Duncan McFarlane.

== Results ==
The following table gives the election results:

1908 Invercargill mayoral election
Party	Candidate	Votes	%	±%
Independent	William Benjamin Scandrett	1,049	54.72	−11.35
Independent	Duncan McFarlane	857	44.70	
Informal votes		11	0.57	−0.44
Majority		192	10.02	−23.14
Turnout		1,917		
