= Susanna Hanan =

New Zealand governess, singer and community worker

Susanna Hanan (née Murray; 1 July 1870 – 12 February 1970) was a New Zealand governess, singer and community worker. She was born in Wallacetown, Southland, New Zealand, on 1 July 1870. She was the wife of Josiah Hanan and the aunt of Ralph Hanan.
