= 1871 Invercargill mayoral election =

1871 mayoral election in Invercargill, New Zealand

- 26 August 1871
- Turnout: 331
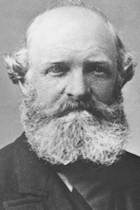

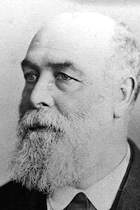
Candidate	William Wood	John Walker Mitchell
Party	Independent	Independent
Popular vote	191	140
Percentage	57.70	42.30
Elected mayor
William Wood

The 1871 Invercargill mayoral election was held on 26 August 1871. It was the first mayoral election of the Invercargill municipality.

Former Superintendent of the Southland Province William Wood defeated John Walker Mitchell, becoming the first Mayor of Invercargill.

== Results ==
The following table gives the election results:

1871 Invercargill mayoral election
Party	Candidate	Votes	%	±%
Independent	William Wood	191	57.70	
Independent	John Walker Mitchell	140	42.30	
Majority		51	15.4	
Turnout		331		
