= Thomas Fleming (flourmiller) =

New Zealand flourmiller

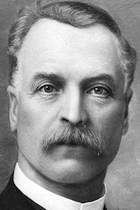
- Born: 5 April 1848; Holme Farm, Lanarkshire, Scotland
- Died: 14 October 1930 (aged 82)
- Occupation: Flourmiller
- Known for: Mayor of Invercargill

Thomas Fleming (5 April 1848 – 14 October 1930) was a New Zealand flourmiller. He was born in Holme Farm, Lanarkshire, Scotland, on 5 April 1848 and immigrated to New Zealand in 1862. Fleming was mayor of Invercargill from 1888 to 1889.
