= 1947 Invercargill mayoral election =

1947 mayoral election in Invercargill, New Zealand

← 1944	19 November 1947	1950 →
- Turnout: 10,031
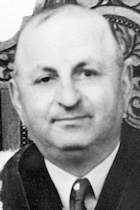

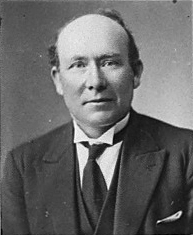
Candidate	Abraham Wachner	William Denham
Party	Independent	Labour
Popular vote	5,514	4,517
Percentage	54.96	45.04
Mayor before election
Abraham Wachner
Elected mayor
Abraham Wachner

The 1947 Invercargill mayoral election was part of the New Zealand local elections held that same year. The polling was conducted using the standard first-past-the-post electoral method.

== Background ==
The incumbent mayor Abraham Wachner sought another term and was re-elected to the position despite a challenge from former Invercargill Borough Councillor and Labour MP William Denham.

== Results ==
The following table gives the election results:

Invercargill mayoral election, 1947
Party	Candidate	Votes	%	±%
Independent	Abraham Wachner	5,514	54.96	−21.37
Labour	William Denham	4,517	45.04	
Majority		997	9.93	−42.74
Turnout		10,031		
