= 1903 Invercargill mayoral election =

1903 mayoral election in Invercargill, New Zealand

- 29 April 1903
- Turnout: 1,215
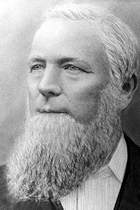

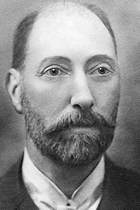
Candidate	George Froggatt	Charles Stephen Longuet
Party	Independent	Independent
Popular vote	618	592
Percentage	50.86	48.72
Mayor before election
Charles Stephen Longuet
Elected mayor
George Froggatt

The 1903 Invercargill mayoral election was held on 29 April 1903 as part of that year's local elections.

Former mayor George Froggatt defeated the incumbent Charles Stephen Longuet.

== Results ==
The following table gives the election results:

1903 Invercargill mayoral election
Party	Candidate	Votes	%	±%
Independent	George Froggatt	618	50.86	
Independent	Charles Stephen Longuet	592	48.72	
Informal votes		5	0.41	
Majority		26	2.14	
Turnout		1,215		
