= William Aitchison =

New Zealand politician

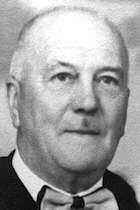

36th Mayor of Invercargill
- In office August 1950 – November 1950

Personal details
- Born: 1880 or 1881 Glasgow, Scotland
- Died: 2 January 1957 (aged 76) Invercargill, New Zealand
- Spouse: Vera Parker
- Children: 5

William Aitchison JP (1880 or 1881 – 2 January 1957) was a New Zealand politician who served as the mayor of Invercargill in 1950.

== Early life ==
Aitchison was born in Glasgow. His family first came to New Zealand in 1900, but returned to Scotland the next year. In 1904 they came back to New Zealand permanently, and Aitchison began working at a grocery store in Christchurch. He moved to Invercargill in 1922 and started a hardware business.

== Political career ==
Aitchison was elected to the Invercargill City Council in 1941 and was re-elected in 1944, topping the poll and thus becoming deputy mayor. While on the council, he advocated for council housing for the elderly. In August 1950, mayor Abraham Wachner died, and Aitchison was appointed as mayor by the council until the election later that year. He did not intend to contest the election, but allowed his nomination to be submitted when no other councillor would step forward. Following former councillor Brian Hewat's entry into the race, Aitchison withdrew his nomination and announced his retirement from politics altogether, leaving Hewat to be elected unopposed.

== Personal life ==
Aitchison was a Presbyterian and attended First Church. He became an elder of the church in June 1926 and taught at the Sunday school for 22 years. He was married twice, having two children in his first marriage and three in his second marriage to Vera Parker. He died in Invercargill on 2 January 1957 and is buried in the Eastern Cemetery.

Political offices
Preceded by Abraham Wachner	Mayor of Invercargill; 1950–1953	Succeeded by Brian Hewat
