= 1989 Auckland City Council election =

Local election in New Zealand

- 14 October 1989

All 24 seats on the Auckland City Council

	First party	Second party	Third party
Party	Citizens & Ratepayers	Labour	Community Independents
Last election	15	5	N/A
Seats won	17	3	1
Seat change	▲2	▼2	▲1
- Results by ward, shaded by highest polling party/sum of indepepdendent candidates

The 1989 Auckland City Council election was part of the 1989 New Zealand local elections, to elect members to sub-national councils and boards. The polling was conducted using the first-past-the-post electoral method.

== Council ==
The Auckland City Council following the 1989 election consisted of a mayor and twenty-four councillors elected from ten wards (Avondale, Eastern Bays, Hauraki Gulf Islands, Hobson, Maungakiekie, Mount Albert, Mount Eden, Mount Roskill, Tamaki and Western Bays).

=== Mayor ===
1989 Auckland mayoral election
Party	Candidate	Votes	%	±%
Labour	Catherine Tizard	61,627	74.01	+12.46
Independent	Malcolm Moses	7,909	9.49	
Independent	Dan Watson	4,462	5.35	
Green	Jack Conran	4,257	5.11	
Independent	Laurence Watkins	1,949	2.34	
Blokes Liberation Front	Chris Brady	1,794	2.15	
McGillicuddy Serious	Mark Servian	1,270	1.52	
Majority		53,718	64.51	+41.40
Turnout		83,268	42.09	

==== Avondale Ward ====
The Avondale Ward elected two members to the Auckland City Council

Avondale Ward
Party	Candidate	Votes	%	±%
Citizens & Ratepayers	Brian Maude	3,407	43.00	+4.35
Labour	Suzanne Sinclair	3,196	40.34	−14.69
Labour	Lorraine Wilson	2,790	35.21	
Citizens & Ratepayers	Reg Mullins	2,306	29.10	
Independent	Frances Spence	2,046	25.82	
Independent	Dennis Scoles	1,217	15.36	
Independent	John Charles Fitton	882	11.13	
Majority		406	5.12	
Turnout		7,922		

==== Eastern Bays Ward ====
The Eastern Bays Ward elected three members to the Auckland City Council

Eastern Bays Ward
Party	Candidate	Votes	%	±%
Independent	Juliet Yates	7,733	62.46	−7.74
Citizens & Ratepayers	Phil Warren	6,664	53.83	
Citizens & Ratepayers	Patricia Thorp	5,545	44.79	
Independent	Gray Bartlett	5,381	43.46	−3.87
Citizens & Ratepayers	Ron Greer	4,250	34.33	−26.22
Independent	Ross Johns	3,642	29.42	
Independent	John Bryce Morton	1,191	9.62	
Independent	Joe Hawke	698	5.63	
Independent	Des Roberts	689	5.56	−22.33
Independent	Phil Kozina	537	4.33	
Independent	Jack Rameka	455	3.67	
Independent	Patrick Byrne	350	2.82	
Majority		164	1.32	
Turnout		12,379		

==== Hauraki Gulf Islands Ward ====
The Hauraki Gulf Islands Ward elected one member to the Auckland City Council

Hauraki Gulf Islands Ward
Party	Candidate	Votes	%	±%
Independent	Sandra Lee	1,879	70.93	
Independent	Alan Murray	456	17.21	
Independent	Caroline De Latour	178	6.71	
Independent	Ian Andrews	93	3.51	
Independent	John Cranstoun	43	1.62	
Majority		1,423	53.71	
Turnout		2,649		

==== Hobson Ward ====
The Hobson Ward elected two members to the Auckland City Council

Hobson Ward
Party	Candidate	Votes	%	±%
Citizens & Ratepayers	Barbara Goodman	6,865	87.63	
Citizens & Ratepayers	John Strevens	5,308	67.75	
Independent	Toni Carolyn Jones	1,587	20.25	
Independent	Luke Van Ryn	1,153	14.71	
Independent	Andrew Tumahai	754	9.62	
Majority		3,721	47.49	
Turnout		7,834		

==== Maungakiekie Ward ====
The Maungakiekie Ward elected three members to the Auckland City Council

Maungakiekie Ward
Party	Candidate	Votes	%	±%
Citizens & Ratepayers	Graham Mountjoy	4,394	52.18	
Citizens & Ratepayers	John Williams	3,380	40.14	
Independent	Grahame Thorne	3,366	39.97	
Citizens & Ratepayers	Leon Leicester	2,904	34.48	
Labour	Noeline Walsh	2,135	25.35	
Labour	Joan Caulfield	2,068	24.56	
Independent	Andrew Stanley	1,766	20.97	
Independent	Mahe Tupouniua	1,331	15.80	
Independent	David Paterson	931	11.05	
Independent	Betty Helen Church	911	10.81	
Independent	George Harding	731	8.68	
Independent	Chris Diack	602	7.14	
Independent	Alan Vessey	473	5.61	
Independent	Lou Davis	268	3.18	
Majority		462	5.48	
Turnout		8,420		

==== Mount Albert Ward ====
The Mount Albert Ward elected two members to the Auckland City Council

Mount Albert Ward
Party	Candidate	Votes	%	±%
Citizens & Ratepayers	Frank Ryan	4,496	61.54	
Citizens & Ratepayers	Alan Wood	3,382	46.29	
Labour	Jenny May Maguire	2,225	30.45	
Labour	Pat Dale	1,662	22.75	
Independent	Valda Cahill	1,369	18.74	
NewLabour	Sam Bassett	786	10.75	
Independent	Ronald Desmond Davis	690	9.44	
Majority		1,157	15.83	
Turnout		7,305		

==== Mount Eden Ward ====
The Mount Eden Ward elected two members to the Auckland City Council

Mount Eden Ward
Party	Candidate	Votes	%	±%
Citizens & Ratepayers	Astrid Malcolm	3,064	47.85	
Citizens & Ratepayers	Gordon Johns	2,834	44.26	
Labour	Kathleen Gaynor Neate	1,725	26.94	
Independent	Peter Boys	1,500	23.42	
Labour	Graham Robert McGregor	1,366	21.33	
Independent	Greg Whitecliffe	792	12.36	
Independent	Allan Llewellyn Hughes	667	10.41	
Independent	William Hardy	512	7.99	
Independent	Roderick James Leggett	346	5.40	
Majority		1,109	17.32	
Turnout		6,403		

==== Mount Roskill Ward ====
The Mount Roskill Ward elected two members to the Auckland City Council

Mount Roskill Ward
Party	Candidate	Votes	%	±%
Citizens & Ratepayers	David Hay	7,841	72.48	
Citizens & Ratepayers	Doug Astley	5,477	50.63	
Citizens & Ratepayers	Grahame Breed	4,936	45.63	
Independent	Roly Magness	4,181	38.65	
Independent	Ernie Pinches	3,859	35.67	
Independent	Glendon Daryl Morwood	2,254	20.83	
NewLabour	Allison Lindley	1,698	15.69	
Independent	Thomas George Fenton	1,235	11.41	
Independent	Okesene Lealaiauloto	970	8.96	
Majority		755	6.97	
Turnout		10,817		

==== Tamaki Ward ====
The Tamaki Ward elected three members to the Auckland City Council

Tamaki Ward
Party	Candidate	Votes	%	±%
Labour	Harry Bean	5,200	61.18	
Citizens & Ratepayers	Bill Christian	3,835	45.12	
Labour	Albie Brown	3,179	37.40	
Labour	Alan Verrall	2,907	34.20	
Citizens & Ratepayers	Ken Graham	2,724	32.05	
Citizens & Ratepayers	Jan Welch	2,470	29.06	
Independent	Stephen Kirkwood	2,351	27.66	−33.37
Independent	Joseph Clark	1,316	15.48	
Independent	Lucy Te Awhitu	676	7.95	
Independent	Fialauia Toailoa-Amituanai	437	5.14	
Independent	Kereama Pene	401	4.71	
Majority		272	3.20	
Turnout		8,499		

==== Western Bays Ward ====
The Western Bays Ward elected three members to the Auckland City Council

Western Bays Ward
Party	Candidate	Votes	%	±%
Community Ind.	Bruce Hucker	2,923	34.78	
Citizens & Ratepayers	Sue Corbett	2,881	34.28	
Citizens & Ratepayers	Gordon Barnaby	2,730	32.48	
Citizens & Ratepayers	Harry Julian	1,952	23.22	
Labour	Tracey Wotherspoon	1,952	23.22	
Labour	Jim Yandall	1,846	21.96	
Labour	Hope Monroe	1,771	21.07	
Independent	Betty Wark	1,688	20.08	
Community Ind.	Georgina Kirby	1,577	18.76	
Community Ind.	Asenaca Uluiviti	1,081	12.86	
Independent	Richard Neil Houghton	932	11.09	
Independent	Margaret Clare Dale	851	10.12	
Independent	Ursula Paul	844	10.04	
Independent	Bob Jones	727	8.65	
Independent	Douglas Charles Owens	616	7.33	
Independent	Wycliffe Elia	464	5.52	
Independent	Harley Frederick Sandgrove	374	4.45	
Majority		778	9.25	
Turnout		8,403		
