= 1965 Invercargill mayoral election =

1965 mayoral election in Invercargill, New Zealand

- 9 October 1965
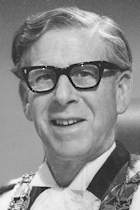
Candidate	Neil Watson	Clive Faul
Party	Independent	Independent
Popular vote	6,006	3,756
Percentage	61.52	38.47
Mayor before election
Neil Watson
Elected mayor
Neil Watson

The 1965 Invercargill mayoral election was part of the New Zealand local elections held that same year. The polling was conducted using the standard first-past-the-post electoral method. Incumbent mayor Neil Watson was re-elected with an increased majority, defeating deputy mayor Clive Faul.

== Results ==
The following table gives the election results:

1965 Invercargill mayoral election
Party	Candidate	Votes	%	±%
Independent	Neil Watson	6,006	61.52	+5.89
Independent	Clive Faul	3,756	38.47	
Majority		2,250	23.05	+11.78
Turnout		9,762		
