= 1968 Invercargill mayoral election =

1968 mayoral election in Invercargill, New Zealand

- 12 October 1968
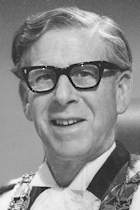
| Candidate | Neil Watson | C. V. Barham |
| Party | Independent | Independent |
| Popular vote | 6,935 | 2,482 |
| Percentage | 73.64 | 26.35 |
Mayor before election
Neil Watson
Elected mayor
Neil Watson

The 1968 Invercargill mayoral election was part of the New Zealand local elections held that same year. The polling was conducted using the standard first-past-the-post electoral method. Incumbent mayor Neil Watson was re-elected with an increased majority, defeating former councillor C. V. Barham.

== Results ==
The following table gives the election results:

1968 Invercargill mayoral election
| Party | Candidate | Votes | % | ±% |
|---|---|---|---|---|
| Independent | Neil Watson | 6,935 | 73.64 | +12.12 |
| Independent | C. V. Barham | 2,482 | 26.35 | |
| Majority | | 4,453 | 47.29 | +24.24 |
| Turnout | | 9,417 | | |
