= 1980 Invercargill mayoral election =

1980 mayoral election in Invercargill, New Zealand

- 11 October 1980
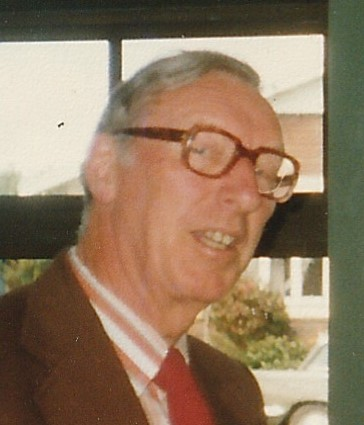

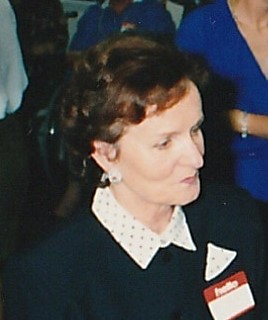
Candidate	F. Russell Miller	Eve Poole
Party	Independent	Independent
Popular vote	6,049	5,491
Percentage	52.41	47.58
Mayor before election
F. Russell Miller
Elected mayor
F. Russell Miller

The 1980 Invercargill mayoral election was part of the New Zealand local elections held that same year. The polling was conducted using the standard first-past-the-post electoral method. In the toughest challenge of his mayoralty, the incumbent F. Russell Miller defeated deputy mayor Eve Poole.

== Results ==
The following table gives the election results:

1980 Invercargill mayoral election
Party	Candidate	Votes	%	±%
Independent	F. Russell Miller	6,049	52.41	
Independent	Eve Poole	5,491	47.58	
Majority		558	4.83	
Turnout		11,540		
