= John Miller (New Zealand politician) =

New Zealand politician and veterinarian (1869–1938)

John Miller MRCVS
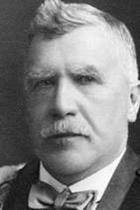

31st Mayor of Invercargill
- In office 1927–1929
- In office 1931–1938†

Personal details
- Born: 1869 Johnstone, Scotland
- Died: 20 September 1938 (aged 69) Invercargill, New Zealand
- Resting place: Eastern Cemetery, Invercargill
- Party: Reform
- Spouse: Bertha Miller
- Children: 6

John Miller MRCVS (1869 – 20 September 1938) was a New Zealand politician and veterinarian. He served as Mayor of Invercargill from 1927 to 1929 and from 1931 until his death in 1938.

== Biography ==
Miller was born in 1869 in Johnstone, Scotland. He became a veterinarian after graduating from the Royal College of Veterinary Surgeons. He lived in Blairgowrie until emigrating to Invercargill, New Zealand, in 1911.

In 1919, Miller was elected to the Invercargill City Council, serving as a councillor until 1927 when he first ran for Mayor. He easily defeated his opponent and became the 31st Mayor of Invercargill. In 1929 he was defeated by councillor John D. Campbell. He challenged Campbell again in 1931 and won by a margin of 44 votes. He defeated Campbell again in 1933 by a larger margin.

He was re-elected to the mayoralty unopposed in April 1935, with Gordon Reed becoming his deputy. In August, Miller was selected as the Invercargill candidate for the National Political Federation in the 1935 New Zealand general election, while Reed was selected as the Democrat Party candidate. Both lost to William Denham, with Reed coming second and Miller third. Reed challenged Miller for the mayoralty in May 1938. Miller easily fended off Reed, and Ralph Hanan became deputy mayor.

Miller died on 20 September 1938. He was the first Mayor of Invercargill to die in office. His funeral was held on 22 September and was attended by thousands, including Andrew Allen, Donald Cameron, and Robert Macfarlane. He was buried in Invercargill's Eastern Cemetery. Hanan replaced Miller as Mayor.

Political offices
Preceded by Andrew Bain	Mayor of Invercargill; 1927–1929; 1931–1938	Succeeded by John D. Campbell
Preceded by John D. Campbell	Mayor of Invercargill; 1927–1929; 1931–1938	Succeeded by Ralph Hanan
