= Auckland City Council =

Territorial authority for Auckland, New Zealand (1989–2010)

- Coat of arms

- Brand logo

Type
- Type: Territorial authority of Auckland City

History
- Established: 1 November 1989; 37 years ago
- Disbanded: 1 November 2010; 16 years ago
- Preceded by: List: Auckland City Council; Ellerslie Borough Council; Mount Albert City Council; Mount Eden Borough Council; Mount Roskill Borough Council; Newmarket Borough Council; Onehunga Borough Council; One Tree Hill Borough Council; Tamaki City Council; Waiheke County Council
- Succeeded by: Auckland Council

Leadership
- First mayor: Catherine Tizard, Lab. 1989–1990
- Last mayor: John Banks, Ind. 2001–2004, 2007–2010

Structure
- Seats: 20 (including mayor) in 2010
- Length of term: 3 years

Elections
- Voting system: First-past-the-post
- First election: 14 October 1989
- Last election: 13 October 2007

Meeting place
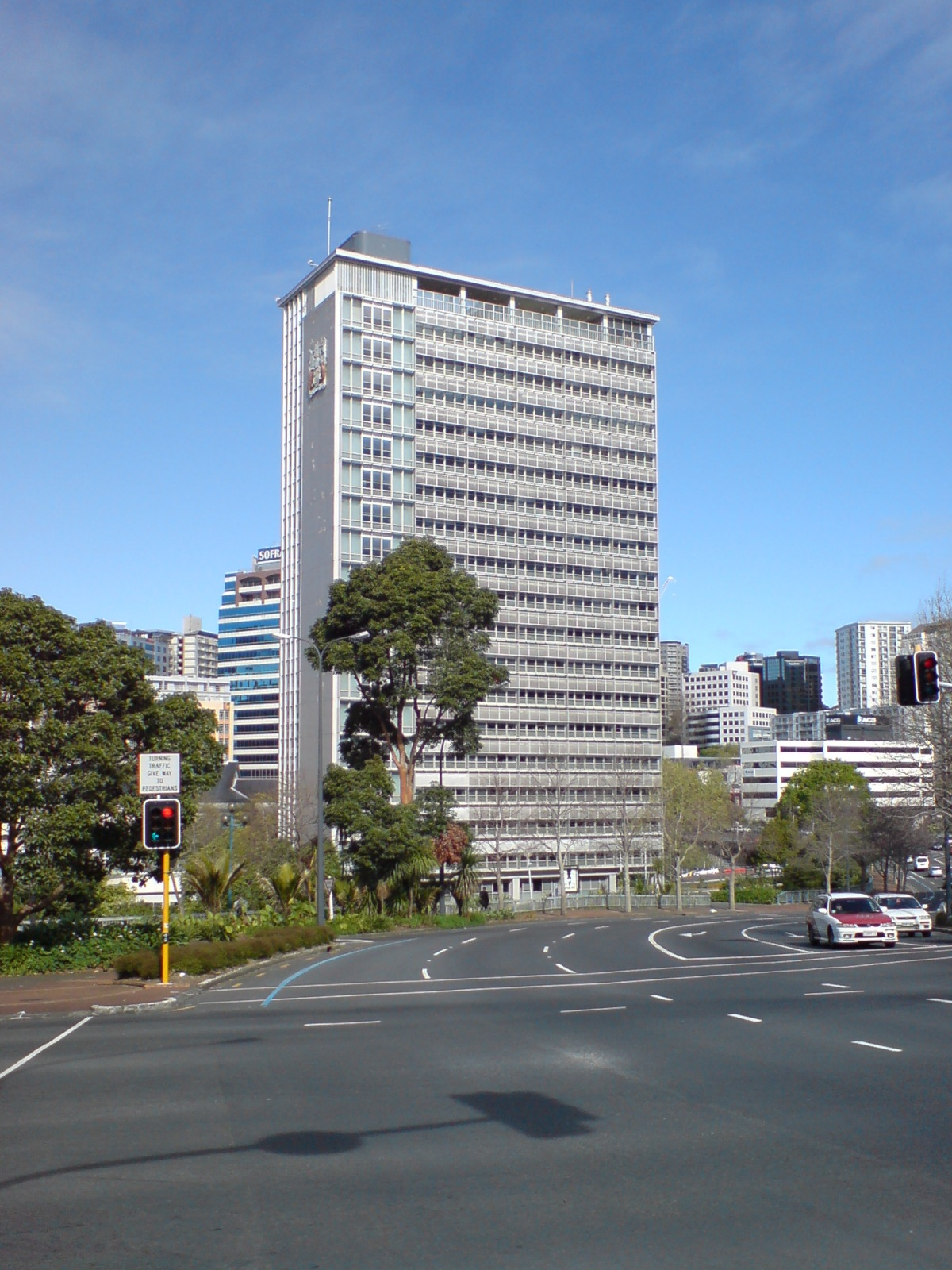
- Civic Administration Building

Website
- aucklandcity.govt.nz (2010 archive)

Auckland City Council was the territorial authority for the city of Auckland, New Zealand. It served as the city's local government alongside Auckland Regional Council as the regional council.

The council was established in 1989 from the amalgamation of several local councils, including a city council of the same name that had existed since 1871. In 2010, it amalgamated with other councils in the Auckland Region to form the 'supercity' Auckland Council.

The governing body of the council had 20 councillors and was chaired by the mayor of Auckland City. The first mayor was Catherine Tizard and the last was John Banks.

== Elections ==
The councillors and the mayor of Auckland City were elected every three years. In the 2007 elections, the voter turnout was 39.4%, down from 48% in 2004 and 43% in 2001.

== Functions ==
Amongst its other functions, the city council administered more than 700 parks and reserves throughout the city (2008 data). It also had, amongst other things, 2214 km of footpaths, though these were often in bad condition (30% being rated as "poor" or "very poor" quality), a matter often discussed in the media, especially after the 2008 elected council chose to reduce the annual upgrade budget by NZ$39 million to $218 million and reduced the budget for new footpaths from NZ$39.5 million to $5.7 million, as part of their campaign to reduce rates increases.

Auckland City, as part of its landscaping programmes, had planted more than 103,000 trees since 2002, with about 16,000 new trees in 2008, a rate that was estimated at four times the trimming and removal rate of public and private trees.

== Finances ==
In the financial year ending June 2007, Auckland City Council had operating revenue of NZ$552 million, of which 68% came from Council rates, which were NZ$859 per ratepayer on average. It expended NZ$343 million on capital projects, of which 45% went to 'transport' expenses, 19% to 'property and asset management' and 17% to 'open spaces, parks and streetscapes', while 10% were spent on 'stormwater and waste management'. Another 7% were spent on 'arts and culture' and 2% on 'zoo, recreational facilities and community development'. The operating surplus was NZ$40.3 million.

== Controversies ==
In 2002 then mayor John Banks announced plans to sell 1570 of its 1700 pensioner flats. A coalition called Council Housing Action Group (CHAG) fought the privatisation. Initially Banks sought to sell the flats on the private market, and the coalition protests included disrupting private auctions. While the coalition was unable to prevent the sell-off, they achieved a substantial "compromise" where the flats were not sold off privately but instead sold to Housing New Zealand. All 1542 pensioner flats and 129 residential houses owned by Auckland City Council were sold to Housing NZ for $83million in 2002-3. The "book value" for all was $132million at the time of sale.

In 2003, a contract award decision concerning waste collection and disposal services was challenged by an unsuccessful tenderer, Onyx Environnement (part of the international Veolia Group). The city's invitation to tender, first launched in 2000, sought proposals for waste collection in the eastern and western parts of the city, with the potential for two separate contracts to be awarded. On separate analysis, Onyx's tenders for each division offered the best value, but the other tenderers offered a discount if their bids were amalgamated and a cross-city contract was awarded. Onyx had not included this provision in their submission, which meant that once this proposal was considered, they were no longer the lowest-cost bidder. They challenged the contract award decision but the High Court upheld the Council's right to consider such a "non-compliant" proposal. Justice Mark O'Regan held that the Council's tendering rules allowed it such discretion and noted that the Council had sought external advice before going ahead with its decision. The Council's lawyers welcomed the ruling as significant for all New Zealand local authorities undertaking public procurement activities.
