= 1917 Invercargill mayoral election =

1917 mayoral election in Invercargill, New Zealand

- 25 April 1917
- Turnout: 4,154
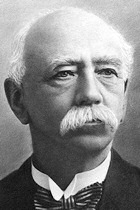

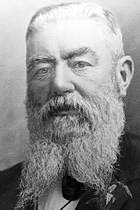
Candidate	John Stead	Duncan McFarlane
Party	Independent	Independent
Popular vote	2,275	1,853
Percentage	54.76	44.60
Mayor before election
Duncan McFarlane
Elected mayor
John Stead

The 1917 Invercargill mayoral election was held on 25 April 1917 as part of that year's local elections.

Former mayor John Stead defeated the incumbent Duncan McFarlane.

== Results ==
The following table gives the election results:

1917 Invercargill mayoral election
Party	Candidate	Votes	%	±%
Independent	John Stead	2,275	54.76	
Independent	Duncan McFarlane	1,853	44.60	−9.88
Informal votes		26	0.62	−0.52
Majority		422	10.16	
Turnout		4,154		
