= 1887 Invercargill mayoral election =

1887 mayoral election in Invercargill, New Zealand

← 1886	30 November 1887	1888 →
- Turnout: 496 (56.17%)
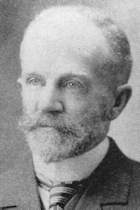
Candidate	Edwin Alfred Tapper	Aaron Blacke
Party	Independent	Independent
Popular vote	300	196
Percentage	60.48	39.51
Mayor before election
Edwin Alfred Tapper
Elected mayor
Edwin Alfred Tapper

The 1887 Invercargill mayoral election was held on 30 November 1887.

The candidates were the same as at the by-election earlier in the year. Edwin Alfred Tapper was re-elected with an increased majority.

== Results ==
The following table gives the election results:

1887 Invercargill mayoral election
Party	Candidate	Votes	%	±%
Independent	Edwin Alfred Tapper	300	60.48	+2.28
Independent	Aaron Blacke	196	39.51	−2.28
Majority		104	20.97	+4.56
Turnout		496	56.17	
