= 1895 Invercargill mayoral election =

1895 mayoral election in Invercargill, New Zealand

- 27 November 1895
- Turnout: 559
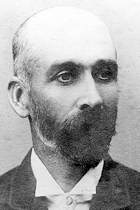

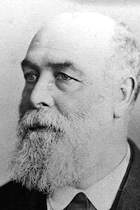
Candidate	John Sinclair	John Walker Mitchell
Party	Independent	Independent
Popular vote	297	262
Percentage	53.13	46.69
Mayor before election
William Benjamin Scandrett
Elected mayor
John Sinclair

The 1895 Invercargill mayoral election was held on 27 November 1895 as part of that year's local elections.

John Sinclair defeated former mayor John Walker Mitchell.

== Results ==
The following table gives the election results:

1895 Invercargill mayoral election
Party	Candidate	Votes	%	±%
Independent	John Sinclair	297	53.13	
Independent	John Walker Mitchell	262	46.69	
Majority		35	6.44	
Turnout		559		
