= 1912 Invercargill mayoral election =

1912 mayoral election in Invercargill, New Zealand

- 25 April 1912
- Turnout: 3,178 (≈46%)
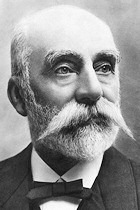

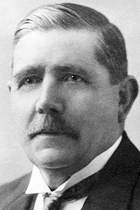
Candidate	William Benjamin Scandrett	Andrew Bain
Party	Independent	Independent
Popular vote	1,959	1,203
Percentage	61.64	37.85
Mayor before election
William Ott
Elected mayor
William Benjamin Scandrett

The 1912 Invercargill mayoral election was held on 25 April 1912 as part of that year's local elections.

Two-time former mayor William Benjamin Scandrett was elected once again. His opponent, Andrew Bain, would first become mayor in 1923.

== Results ==
The following table gives the election results:

1912 Invercargill mayoral election
Party	Candidate	Votes	%	±%
Independent	William Benjamin Scandrett	1,959	61.64	
Independent	Andrew Bain	1,203	37.85	
Informal votes		16	0.50	
Majority		756	23.79	
Turnout		3,178		
