= 1914 Invercargill mayoral election =

1914 mayoral election in Invercargill, New Zealand

- 29 April 1914
- Turnout: 4,302 (48.08%)
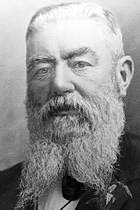

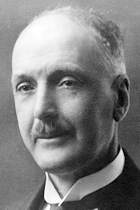
Candidate	Duncan McFarlane	William Ott
Party	Independent	Independent
Popular vote	2,518	1,784
Percentage	58.53	41.47
Mayor before election
Duncan McFarlane
Elected mayor
Duncan McFarlane

The 1914 Invercargill mayoral election was held on 29 April 1914 as part of that year's local elections. This was the final election for an annual term; beginning in 1915, terms would be biennial.

Incumbent mayor Duncan McFarlane was re-elected with an increased majority against former mayor William Ott.

== Results ==
The following table gives the election results:

1914 Invercargill mayoral election
Party	Candidate	Votes	%	±%
Independent	Duncan McFarlane	2,518	58.53	+8.45
Independent	William Ott	1,784	41.47	
Majority		734	17.06	+15.54
Turnout		4,302	48.08	
