= Josiah Hanan =

New Zealand politician (1868–1954)

The Honourable Josiah Hanan
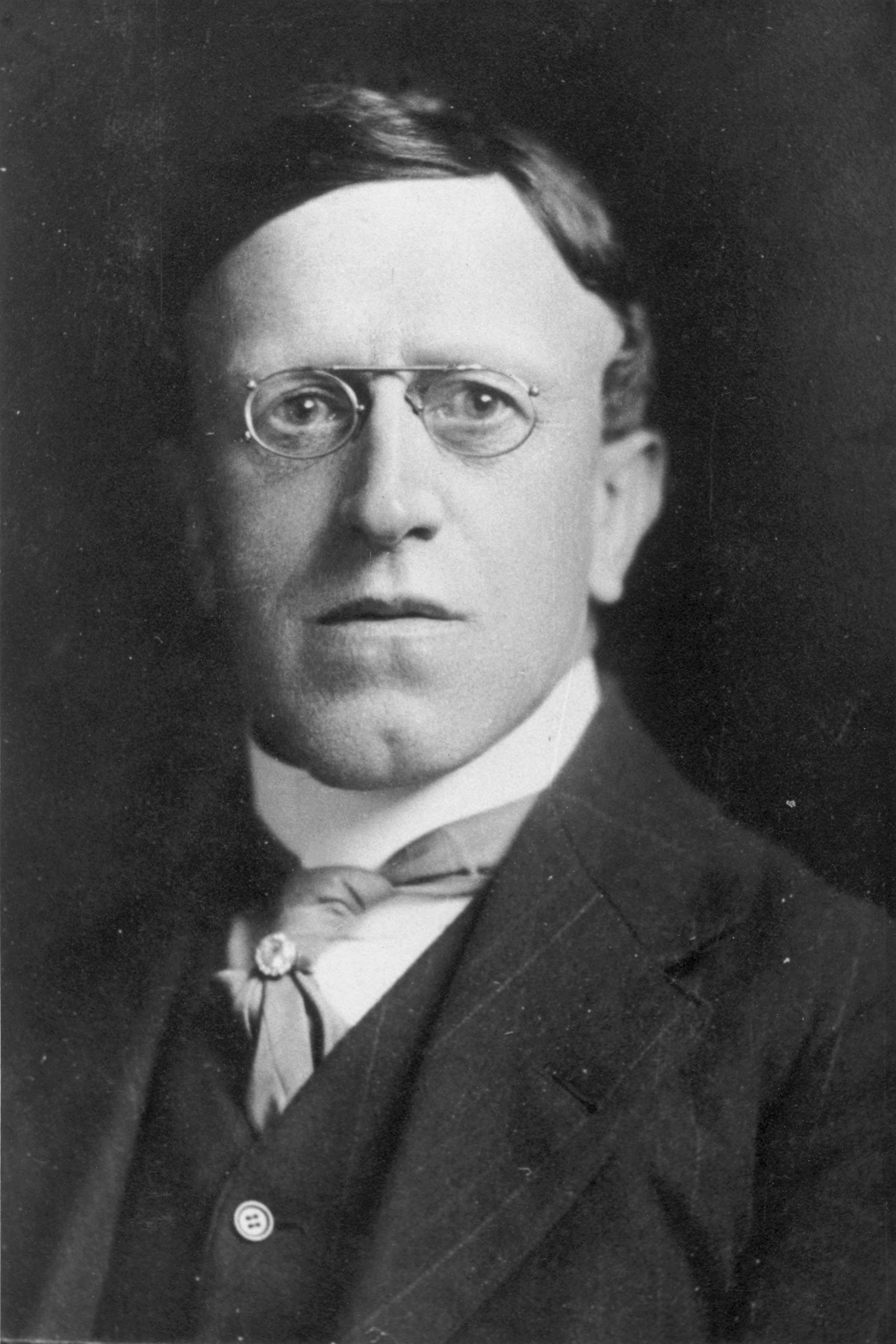
- Josiah Hanan, c. 1908

10th Chairman of Committees of the Legislative Council
- In office 7 October 1932 – 5 July 1939
- Preceded by: Edward Henry Clark
- Succeeded by: Bernard Martin

Member of the New Zealand Legislative Council
- In office 17 June 1926 – 31 December 1950

Member of the New Zealand Parliament for Invercargill
- In office 6 December 1899 – 4 November 1925
- Preceded by: James Whyte Kelly
- Succeeded by: Joseph Ward

23rd Mayor of Invercargill
- In office 1896–1897
- Preceded by: John Sinclair
- Succeeded by: Hugh Mair

Personal details
- Born: Josiah Alfred Hanan; 12 May 1868 Invercargill, New Zealand
- Died: 22 March 1954 (aged 85) Dunedin, New Zealand
- Spouses: Abigail Susan Graham (m. 1896; died 1898); Susanna Murray (m. 1902)
- Relations: Ralph Hanan (nephew)

Josiah Alfred Hanan (12 May 1868 – 22 March 1954), known to his colleagues as Joe Hanan, was a New Zealand politician, cabinet minister, and legislative councillor. He also served as Mayor of Invercargill, and as Chancellor of the University of New Zealand.

== Early life ==
Hanan was born in Invercargill, New Zealand, and educated at Invercargill Central School (dux) and Southland Boys' High School. He was a civil and criminal lawyer 1889–1899 with a good reputation, defending Minnie Dean and John Keown on murder charges.

== Political career ==
New Zealand Parliament
Years	Term	Electorate	Party
1899–1902	14th	Invercargill	Liberal
1902–1905	15th	Invercargill	Liberal
1905–1908	16th	Invercargill	Liberal
1908–1911	17th	Invercargill	Liberal
1911–1914	18th	Invercargill	Liberal
1914–1919	19th	Invercargill	Liberal
1919–1922	20th	Invercargill	Liberal
1922–1925	21st	Invercargill	Liberal

He entered politics in 1894, when he became a borough councillor. In 1896, he was elected Mayor of Invercargill (the youngest, and the first NZ-born). In 1899 he was elected as the member of the House of Representatives for the Invercargill electorate. He held the electorate for the next 26 years, and retired at the 1925 election.

In 1912 he was appointed Minister of Education, Minister of Justice, and Minister of Stamp Duties in the short lived cabinet of Thomas Mackenzie. He also served in the wartime National Ministry, holding the portfolios of education (1915–1919), justice (1917), and immigration (1915). On his retirement from the House in 1925 he was appointed as a Member of the Legislative Council, a position he held until its abolition in 1950. From 1932 to 1939, he was Chairman of Committees.

Hanan was better known to his colleagues as Joe.

== Family and death ==
Hanan married Abigail Susan Graham in 1896, but she died in 1898. Then he married Susanna Murray and they had two sons. The family would commute to Wellington for the parliamentary sessions and their boys attended boarding school there. When Hanan retired from Parliament in 1925, they moved to Dunedin, where by then their boys were attending university. His brother James Albert Hanan had a son, Ralph Hanan, who would later become Mayor of Invercargill and represented the Invercargill electorate in Parliament, where he held several cabinet posts.

Josiah Hanan died in Dunedin on 22 March 1954, where he was cremated. He was survived by his sons and his wife. Susanna Hanan died on 12 February 1970 in Dunedin and her ashes were scattered.

== Notes ==
Political offices
Preceded by John Sinclair	Mayor of Invercargill; 1896–1897	Succeeded by Hugh Mair
Preceded by John Findlay	Minister of Justice; 1912; 1917	Succeeded by Alexander Herdman
Preceded by Robert McNab	Minister of Justice; 1912; 1917	Succeeded by Thomas Wilford
Preceded by John Findlay	Minister of Police; 1912	Succeeded by Alexander Herdman
Preceded by George Fowlds	Minister of Education; 1912; 1915–1919	Succeeded by James Allen
Preceded by James Allen	Minister of Education; 1912; 1915–1919	Succeeded by Francis Bell
Preceded by Edward Henry Clark	Chairman of Committees of the Legislative Council; 1932–1939	Succeeded by Bernard Martin
New Zealand Parliament
Preceded by James Whyte Kelly	Member of Parliament for Invercargill; 1899–1925	Succeeded by Joseph Ward
