= 1892 Invercargill mayoral election =

1892 mayoral election in Invercargill, New Zealand

- 1 December 1892
- Turnout: 444
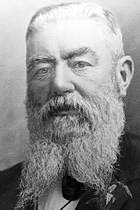

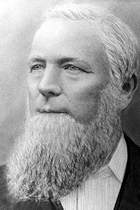
Candidate	Duncan McFarlane	George Froggatt
Party	Independent	Independent
Popular vote	251	193
Percentage	56.53	43.46
Mayor before election
James Walker Bain
Elected mayor
Duncan McFarlane

The 1892 Invercargill mayoral election was held on 1 December 1892 as part of that year's local elections.

Councillor Duncan McFarlane defeated former mayor George Froggatt.

== Results ==
The following table gives the election results:

1892 Invercargill mayoral election
Party	Candidate	Votes	%	±%
Independent	Duncan McFarlane	251	56.53	
Independent	George Froggatt	193	43.46	
Majority		58	13.07	
Turnout		444		
