= F. Russell Miller =

New Zealand politician (1914–1992)

F. Russell Miller QSO
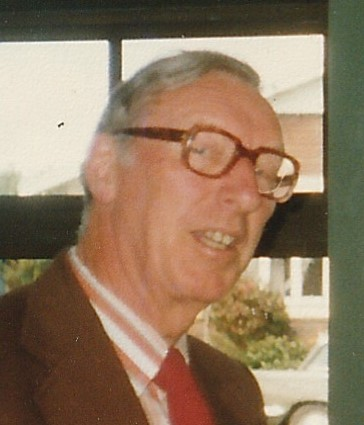

40th Mayor of Invercargill
- In office 1971–1983

Personal details
- Born: Francis Russell Miller; 2 February 1914 Dunedin, New Zealand
- Died: 25 February 1992 (aged 78) Invercargill, New Zealand
- Spouse: Dorothy
- Children: 4
- Education: University of Otago

Francis Russell Miller QSO (2 February 1914 – 25 February 1992) was a New Zealand politician who served as Mayor of Invercargill from 1971 to 1983.

== Early life ==
Miller was born in Dunedin and raised in Invercargill. He attended St. George Primary School and Southland Boys' High School. After graduating from the University of Otago Medical School with Bachelors of Medicine and Surgery, he spent seven years in Britain studying at the University of Edinburgh and practising as a surgeon during World War II. He returned to Invercargill in 1946 and worked as a general practitioner until 1957.

== Political career ==
Miller entered politics in 1962, winning a seat on the Invercargill City Council as the highest polling non-incumbent candidate. He topped the poll at the next election and was subsequently appointed deputy mayor, a position he held for two terms.

In 1971, Miller successfully ran for mayor, defeating fellow councillor F. W. Harvey. He was re-elected in 1974 and did not face a challenger in 1977. In the 1978 Queen's Birthday Honours, he was appointed a Companion of the Queen's Service Order. In 1980, Miller faced his toughest election, but ultimately defeated his deputy mayor and eventual successor Eve Poole. During his mayoralty, he established Invercargill's first sister city relationship with Hobart, Australia. He retired in 1983, and at twelve years was the longest-serving mayor of Invercargill until Tim Shadbolt.

== Death ==
Miller died on 25 February 1992 at the age of 78. He was cremated and interred at the Southland Crematorium.

Political offices
Preceded by Neil Watson	Mayor of Invercargill; 1971–1983	Succeeded by Eve Poole
