= William Ott =

New Zealand mayor and businessman

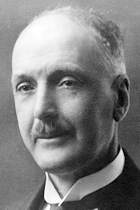
- William Ott

28th Mayor of Invercargill
- In office 1910–1912
- Preceded by: Charles Stephen Longuet
- Succeeded by: William Benjamin Scandrett

Personal details
- Born: 26 December 1872 Invercargill, New Zealand
- Died: 4 January 1951 (aged 78)
- Resting place: Eastern Cemetery, Invercargill
- Spouses: Isabella Frew Ott (m. 1901, d. 1922); Marjory Forsyth Ott (m. 1925; d. 1945)

William Alexander Ott (1872 – 4 January 1951) was a prominent Invercargill, New Zealand sharebroker and businessman and Mayor of Invercargill from 1910 to 1912. During his mayoralty, the Invercargill tram network was opened.

== Biography ==
Ott was born in Invercargill in 1872 the younger son of John George Ott, an Invercargill tailor, and Margaret Murray who had married in Dunedin in 1862. Ott also had an elder sister and a sister Margaret who died in 1870 aged four months. He trained as an accountant and became a fellow of the New Zealand Accountants' and Auditors' Association.

Ott's family came from the German village of Dörnach which is these days part of Pliezhausen in Tübingen. His uncle (Johan Jacob) Jacob Ott came to Dunedin in the early 1850s. Jacob was a shoemaker and came out employed by the Lutheran Mission under Johann Friedrich Heinrich Wohlers. Not a missionary himself, Jacob later owned the Whitehouse Hotel in Waikiwi. Jacob financed two of his siblings to follow him out to New Zealand; his sister Maria Barbara who appears on the shipping list as Elizabeth as well as William's father (Johan Georg) George. The pair arrived in Dunedin from London on the Maori on 16 April 1857.

William Ott was elected onto the Invercargill Borough Council in 1900. In April 1910, he was elected unopposed to the Invercargill mayoralty. A year later, he was re-elected unopposed. Ott did not contest the 1912 mayoral election; it was won by William Benjamin Scandrett, who defeated Andrew Bain.

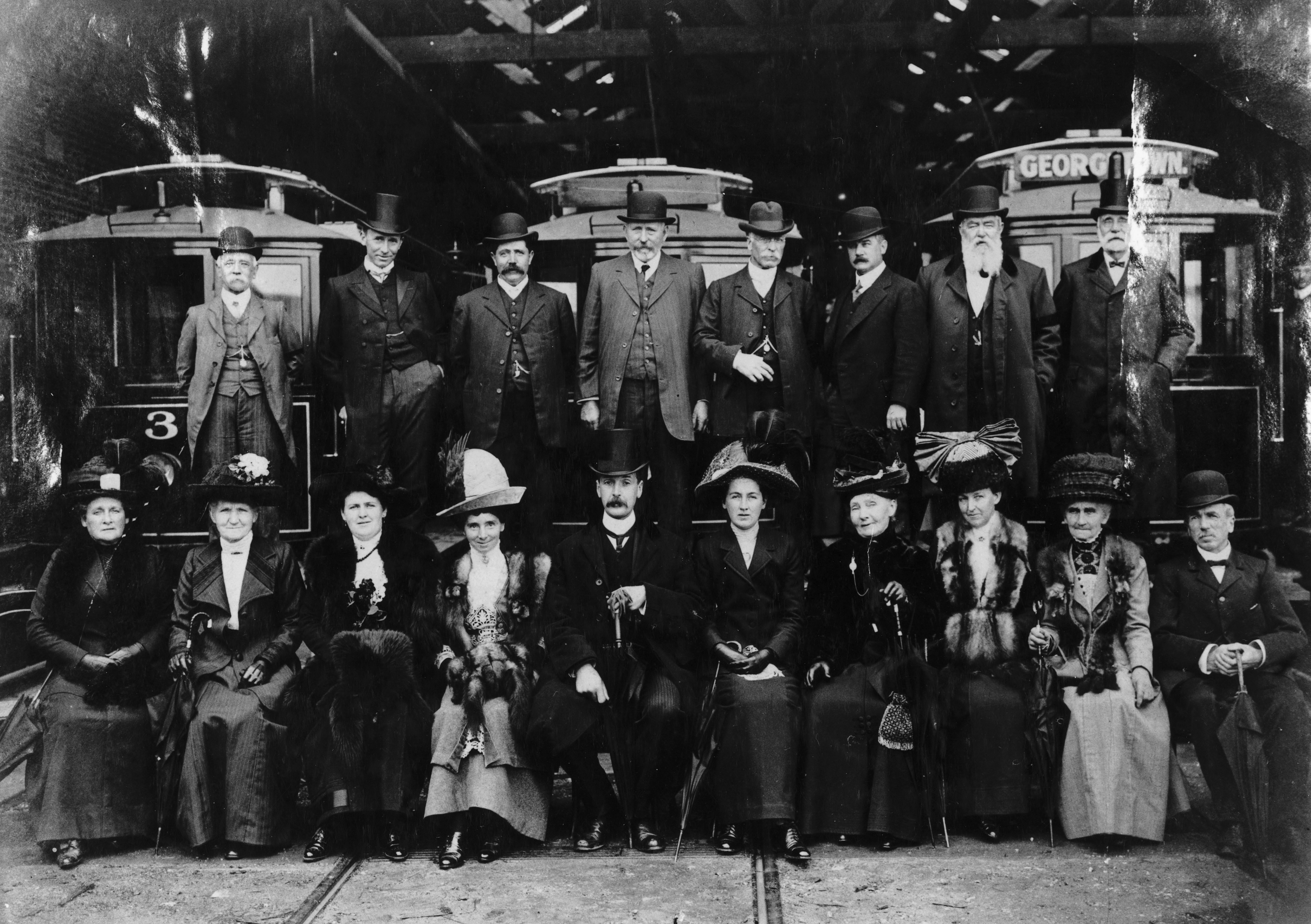
Opening of the Invercargill Tramways, with Mayor William Ott seated in the centre of the front row

During his mayoralty, he opened the electric Invercargill tram network, with the Prime Minister Joseph Ward in attendance. It was the southernmost tram system in the world. At the occasion, Ott was handed a cloak from the late paramount chief Topi Patuki. The Ott family returned the cloak to descendants of Patuki after six members of his family died in May 2006 when the fishing vessel Kotuku overturned in Foveaux Strait.

== Family and death ==
On 17 April 1901, William Alexander Ott married Isabella Frew Campbell of Invercargill. They were to have one son and one daughter: William Frew Murray Ott (1903–1993; known as Murray) and Marjory Isabel Ott (b. 1908). Their mother died in 1922. In 1925, he married Marjory Forsyth Dobie. They had two sons, Alexander Bruce Ott (known as Bruce), born 26 March 1927 and J. Malcolm Ott (known as Malcolm), born 3 June 1930. His second wife died in 1945.

Ott's mother Margaret died in 1907 and his father George died in 1909. His eldest brother John George Ott born 1864 who spent most of his adult life in California died in 1954. William Ott died on 4 January 1951, aged 78 years. All are buried in the family grave in the Invercargill Eastern Cemetery.

Political offices
Preceded by Charles Stephen Longuet	Mayor of Invercargill; 1910–1912	Succeeded by William Benjamin Scandrett
