= 1989 Invercargill mayoral election =

1989 mayoral election in Invercargill, New Zealand

- 14 October 1989
- Turnout: 26,208
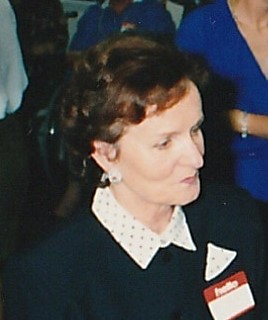
Candidate	Eve Poole	Bruce Pagan	Bob Simpson
Party	Independent	Independent	Independent
Popular vote	14,657	6,911	3,070
Percentage	55.92	26.36	11.71
Mayor before election
Eve Poole
Elected mayor
Eve Poole

The 1989 Invercargill mayoral election was held on 14 October 1989 as part of the 1989 New Zealand local elections, and was conducted under the First Past the Post system. It was the first election in Invercargill to include postal voting.

Incumbent mayor Eve Poole was re-elected with a reduced majority.

== Results ==
The following table gives the election results:

1989 Invercargill mayoral election
Party	Candidate	Votes	%	±%
Independent	Eve Poole	14,657	55.92	−9.24
Independent	Bruce Pagan	6,911	26.36	
Independent	Bob Simpson	3,070	11.71	
Independent	Terry King	1,570	5.99	−28.84
Majority		7,746	29.55	−0.78
Turnout		26,208		
