= 1974 Invercargill mayoral election =

1974 mayoral election in Invercargill, New Zealand

- 12 October 1974
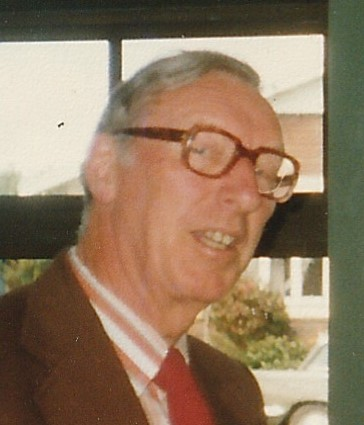
Candidate	F. Russell Miller	C. V. Barham
Party	Independent	Independent
Popular vote	9,282	2,394
Percentage	79.49	20.50
Mayor before election
F. Russell Miller
Elected mayor
F. Russell Miller

The 1974 Invercargill mayoral election was part of the New Zealand local elections held that same year. The polling was conducted using the standard first-past-the-post electoral method. After just barely failing to rejoin the council at the 1971 election, former councillor C. V. Barham once again contested the mayoralty. Incumbent mayor F. Russell Miller easily defeated him, albeit with a reduced majority.

== Results ==
The following table gives the election results:

1974 Invercargill mayoral election
Party	Candidate	Votes	%	±%
Independent	F. Russell Miller	9,282	79.49	−2.61
Independent	C. V. Barham	2,394	20.50	
Majority		6,888	58.99	−5.22
Turnout		11,676		
