= Ralph Hanan =

New Zealand politician (1909–1969)

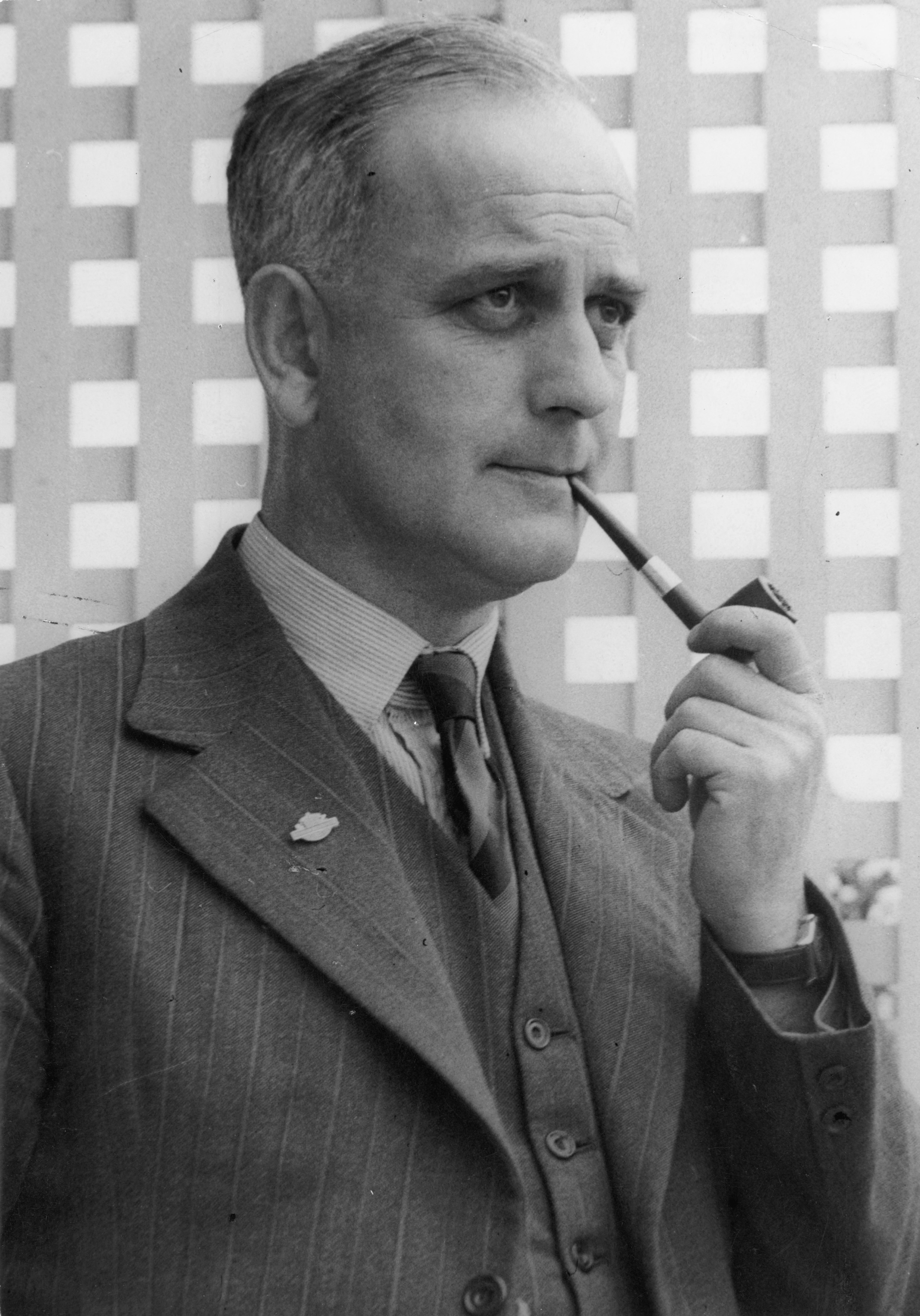
- Ralph Hanan, circa 1946

17th Minister of Health
- In office 26 November 1954 – 12 December 1957
- Prime Minister: Sidney Holland; Keith Holyoake
- Preceded by: Jack Marshall
- Succeeded by: Rex Mason

20th Attorney-General
- In office 12 December 1960 – 24 July 1969
- Prime Minister: Keith Holyoake
- Preceded by: Rex Mason
- Succeeded by: Jack Marshall

33rd Minister of Justice
- In office 12 December 1960 – 24 July 1969
- Prime Minister: Keith Holyoake
- Preceded by: Rex Mason
- Succeeded by: Dan Riddiford

31st Minister of Maori Affairs
- In office 12 December 1960 – 24 July 1969
- Prime Minister: Keith Holyoake
- Preceded by: Walter Nash
- Succeeded by: Duncan MacIntyre

Member of the New Zealand Parliament for Invercargill
- In office 1946–1969
- Preceded by: William Denham
- Succeeded by: John Chewings

33rd Mayor of Invercargill
- In office 1938–1941
- Preceded by: John Miller
- Succeeded by: John Robert Martin

Personal details
- Born: 13 June 1909 Invercargill, New Zealand
- Died: 24 July 1969 (aged 60) Cairns, Australia
- Resting place: Saint Johns Cemetery, Invercargill
- Party: National
- Relations: Josiah Hanan (uncle); Susanna Hanan (aunt)

Military service
- Allegiance: New Zealand
- Branch/service: New Zealand Army
- Years of service: 1941–1944
- Rank: Captain
- Unit: 20th Battalion
- Battles/wars: World War II; First Battle of El Alamein; Italian campaign

Josiah Ralph Hanan (13 June 1909 – 24 July 1969), known as Ralph Hanan, was a New Zealand politician of the National Party. He was Mayor of Invercargill and then represented the Invercargill electorate in Parliament, following in his uncle Josiah Hanan's footsteps. He served in World War II and his injuries ultimately caused his death at age 60. He is best remembered for the abolition of the death penalty, which had been suspended by the Labour Party, but which National was to reintroduce. As Minister of Justice, it was Hanan's role to introduce the legislation to Parliament, but he convinced enough of his party colleagues to vote with the opposition and thus abolished the death penalty in New Zealand.

== Early life ==
Hanan was born in 1909 in Invercargill. He was the son of the draper James Albert Hanan and his wife, Johanna Mary McGill. His uncle and aunt were Josiah and Susanna Hanan. He received his education from Southland Boys' High School, Waitaki Boys' High School, and the University of Otago, from where he obtained an LLB. He returned to Invercargill and practised law from 1935. In 1939, he went into partnership with Ian Arthur, practising as Hanan Arthur and Company. In 1940, he enlisted for war service.

On 3 March 1939, he married Ruby Eirene Anderson, known as Eirene, at Invercargill's St Paul's Presbyterian Church.

== Early political career ==
Hanan was elected to Invercargill City Council in 1935. Three years later, he was elected Mayor of Invercargill. He relinquished the position in 1941 so that he could participate in the war. His uncle had previously been Mayor of Invercargill (1896–1897).

== War service ==
He served with the 20th Canterbury-Otago Battalion in the Middle East and in Italy. He was wounded at the outbreak of Minquar Qaim. He would have died had it not been for a truck driver who found him unconscious, put him onto the back of the lorry and took him away. The injuries resulted in a serious lung condition that saw him sent home in 1944 as an invalid. He had attained the rank of captain during the war.

== Post-war political career ==
New Zealand Parliament
| Years | Term | Electorate | Party |
|---|---|---|---|
| 1946–1949 | 28th | Invercargill | National |
| 1949–1951 | 29th | Invercargill | National |
| 1951–1954 | 30th | Invercargill | National |
| 1954–1957 | 31st | Invercargill | National |
| 1957–1960 | 32nd | Invercargill | National |
| 1960–1963 | 33rd | Invercargill | National |
| 1963–1966 | 34th | Invercargill | National |
| 1966–1969 | 35th | Invercargill | National |

Hanan represented the Invercargill electorate in Parliament from 1946 to 1969, as had his uncle before him (1899–1925). He held positions as Minister of Health (1954–1957), Minister of Immigration (1954–1957), Attorney-General (1960–1969), Minister of Justice (1960–1969), Minister of Māori Affairs (1960–1969), and Minister of Island Territories (1963–1969).

In 1961, Hanan and nine other National MPs (Ernest Aderman, Gordon Grieve, Duncan MacIntyre, Robert Muldoon, Lorrie Pickering, Logan Sloane, Brian Talboys, Esme Tombleson and Bert Walker) crossed the floor and voted with Labour to abolish the death penalty for murder in New Zealand. As Minister of Justice, it was his responsibility to introduce the law to Parliament, but he did so by saying that he disagreed with it. He convinced enough of his party colleagues to vote with the opposition and thus abolished the death penalty in New Zealand, which is what he is best remembered for.

In much of his political work, Hanan was able to read the mood of the public well and he was guided by this. On many occasions, he developed policy that was initially not accepted by his party colleagues, but he managed to talk them round to it. One controversial piece of legislation that he introduced was the Maori Affairs Amendment Act 1967, which was bitterly opposed by many Māori, as they feared that it would lead to further loss of land. Hanan was also an early supporter of homosexual law reform, writing to the New Zealand Homosexual Law Reform Society that he commended their goal of "replacing prejudice and emotion by understanding and a rational approach."

Hanan belonged to the powerful inner circle of the Holyoake cabinet. When two of the inner circle, Hanan and Tom Shand (Minister of Labour), died within months of one another, Holyoake's strong position was weakened.

In 1953, Hanan was awarded the Queen Elizabeth II Coronation Medal.

== Death ==
Hanan died on 24 July 1969, aged 60, after attending the annual conference of state attorneys general in Brisbane. He died in Cairns, Australia. His relatively early death is linked to his war injuries. He was buried at Invercargill's Saint Johns Cemetery. An act was passed to avoid the need for a by-election before the general election on 29 November, the 'By-election Postponement Act 1969'. His wife survived him by almost four decades and died on 26 July 2007; she is buried next to him.

== Legacy ==
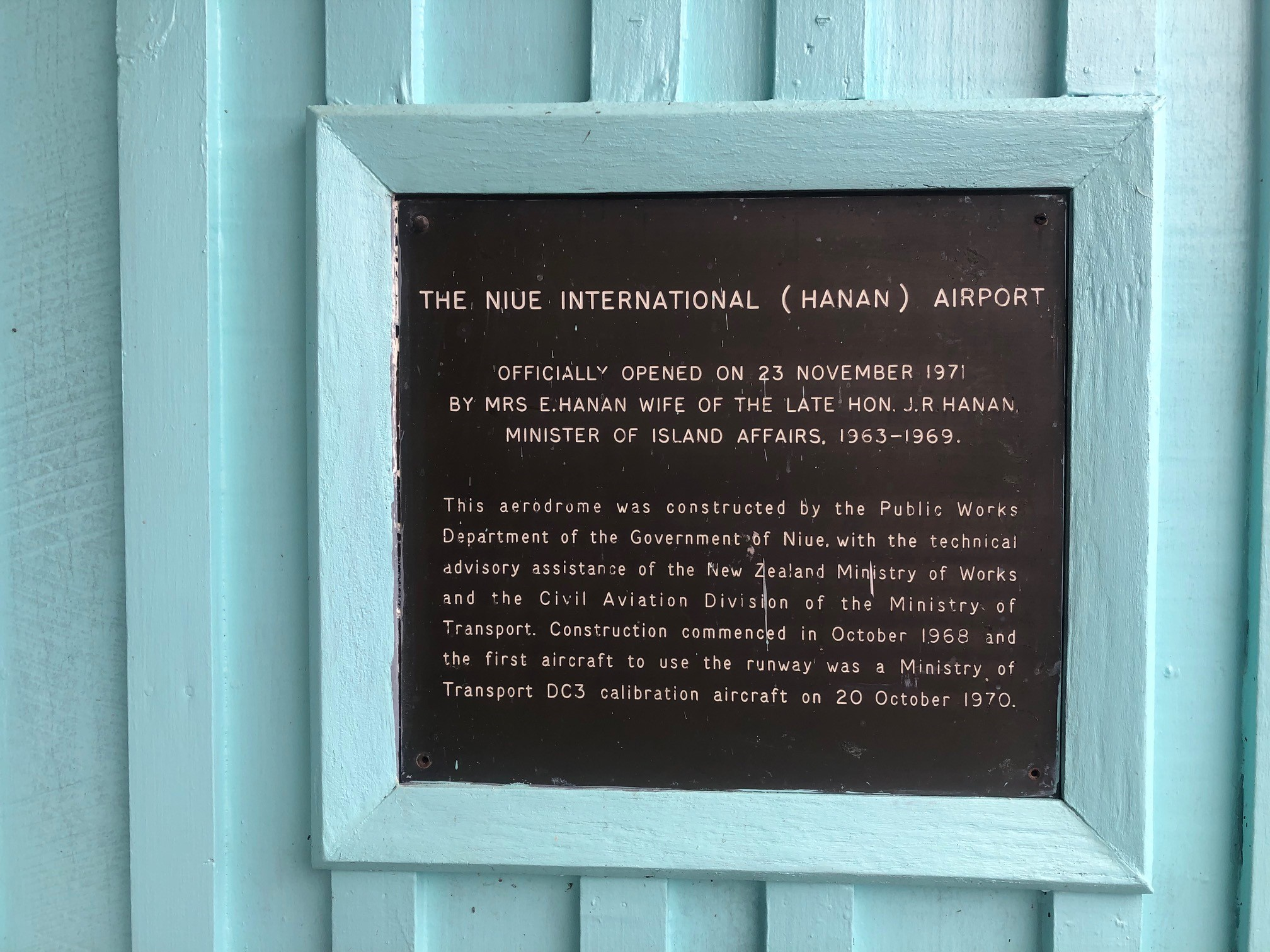
Plaque at Niue's airport recording Hanan's involvement

The Niue International Airport is named after Hanan, having been constructed during his tenure as Minister of Island Affairs (1963–1969). It was officially opened by his wife on 23 November 1971. A small plaque at the airport records these details, while the sign outside the airport misspells his name as "Hannan".

== Sources ==
- Gustafson, Barry (1986). The First 50 Years : A History of the New Zealand National Party. Auckland: Reed Methuen. ISBN 0-474-00177-6.
- Wilson, Jim (1985) [First ed. published 1913]. New Zealand Parliamentary Record, 1840–1984 (4th ed.). Wellington: V.R. Ward, Govt. Printer. OCLC 154283103.

Political offices
| Preceded by John Miller | Mayor of Invercargill; 1938–1941 | Succeeded by John Robert Martin |
| Preceded by Jack Marshall | Minister of Health; 1954–1957 | Succeeded by Rex Mason |
| Preceded by Rex Mason | Attorney-General; 1960–1969 | Succeeded by Jack Marshall |
| Preceded by Rex Mason | Minister of Justice; 1960–1969 | Succeeded by Dan Riddiford |
New Zealand Parliament
| Preceded by William Denham | Member of Parliament for Invercargill; 1946–1969 | Succeeded by John Chewings |
