= Adam Adamson =

New Zealand accountant and politician (1884–1984)

Adam Adamson OBE
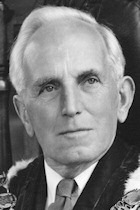

38th Mayor of Invercargill
- In office 1953–1962

Personal details
- Born: Adam Laurence Adamson; 10 March 1884 Pahia, New Zealand
- Died: 21 July 1984 (aged 100)
- Spouse: Alice Floyd Harrington (m. 1922)
- Children: 2

Adam Laurence "Addie" Adamson OBE (10 March 1884 – 21 July 1984) was a New Zealand businessman, accountant and local politician. He served as mayor of Invercargill from 1953 to 1962.

== Early life ==
Born in Pahia in Western Southland, Adamson was educated at Pahia School and Southland Boys' High School. He was born without a right hand. He worked on offices and ran general stores in Tuatapere and Orepuke with his brother Harry before becoming a partner in the firm of Featherston, Adamson and Francis, Accountants and Secretarial Services. He also had a small farm at Tuatapere.

== Political career ==
Adamson was a city councillor from 1944 for nine years, then was mayor from 1953 to 1962. He was elected president of the New Zealand Municipal Association in 1960.

In the 1956 New Year Honours, Adamson was appointed an Officer of the Order of the British Empire, in recognition of his service as mayor.

== Personal life and death ==
Adamson married Alice Harrington in 1922. He was a Presbyterian Church elder. He drove a car until he was 99, and spoke at a formal dinner two nights before his death on 21 July 1984, aged 100. His wife, Alice Adamson, died in 1990, also at the age of 100.

Political offices
Preceded by Brian Hewat	Mayor of Invercargill; 1942–1950	Succeeded by Neil Watson
