= 1919 Invercargill mayoral election =

1919 mayoral election in Invercargill, New Zealand

- 30 April 1919
- Turnout: 3,265 (38.52%)
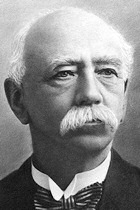
Candidate	John Stead	T. D. Lennie
Party	Independent	Independent
Popular vote	1,673	1,559
Percentage	51.24	47.74
Mayor before election
John Stead
Elected mayor
John Stead

The 1919 Invercargill mayoral election was held on 30 April 1919 as part of that year's local elections.

Incumbent mayor John Stead was re-elected with a reduced majority.

== Results ==
The following table gives the election results:

1919 Invercargill mayoral election
Party	Candidate	Votes	%	±%
Independent	John Stead	1,673	51.24	−3.52
Independent	Thomas Daniel Lennie	1,559	47.74	
Informal votes		33	1.01	+0.39
Majority		114	3.50	−6.66
Turnout		3,265	38.52	
