= 1927 Invercargill mayoral election =

1927 mayoral election in Invercargill, New Zealand

- 27 April 1927
- Turnout: 4,778
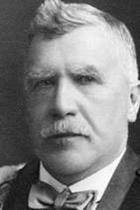
| Candidate | John Miller | S. McDonald |
| Party | Independent | Independent |
| Popular vote | 3,503 | 1,275 |
| Percentage | 73.31 | 26.68 |
Mayor before election
Andrew Bain
Elected mayor
John Miller

The 1927 Invercargill mayoral election was part of the New Zealand local elections held that same year. The polling was conducted using the standard first-past-the-post electoral method.

== Results ==
The following table gives the election results:

1927 Invercargill mayoral election
| Party | Candidate | Votes | % | ±% |
|---|---|---|---|---|
| Independent | John Miller | 3,503 | 73.31 | |
| Independent | S. McDonald | 1,275 | 26.68 | |
| Majority | | 2,228 | 46.63 | |
| Turnout | | 4,778 | | |
