= 1992 Invercargill mayoral election =

1992 mayoral election in Invercargill, New Zealand

- 10 October 1992
- Turnout: 23,705
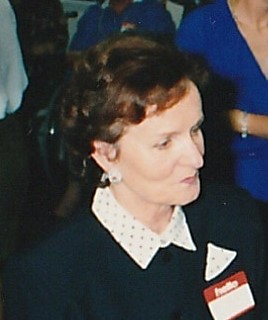
| Candidate | Eve Poole | Bruce Pagan | Mirek Cvigr |
| Party | Independent | Independent | Independent |
| Popular vote | 8,975 | 8,342 | 6,388 |
| Percentage | 37.86 | 35.19 | 26.94 |
Mayor before election
Eve Poole
Elected mayor
Eve Poole

The 1992 Invercargill mayoral election was held on 10 October 1992, as part of the 1992 New Zealand local elections, and was conducted under the First Past the Post system.

Incumbent mayor Eve Poole was re-elected with a reduced majority in a tight three-way race with deputy mayor Bruce Pagan and councillor Mirek Cvigr.

Poole died two months later, triggering a by-election in March 1993.

== Results ==
The following table gives the election results:

1992 Invercargill mayoral election
| Party | Candidate | Votes | % | ±% |
|---|---|---|---|---|
| Independent | Eve Poole | 8,975 | 37.86 | −18.06 |
| Independent | Bruce Pagan | 8,342 | 35.19 | +8.83 |
| Independent | Mirek Cvigr | 6,388 | 26.94 | |
| Majority | | 633 | 2.67 | −26.88 |
| Turnout | | 23,705 | | |
