= 1898 Invercargill mayoral election =

1898 mayoral election in Invercargill, New Zealand

- 1 December 1898
- Turnout: 521
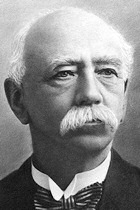

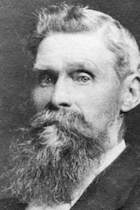
| Candidate | John Stead | Hugh Mair |
| Party | Independent | Independent |
| Popular vote | 415 | 106 |
| Percentage | 79.65 | 20.34 |
Mayor before election
Hugh Mair
Elected mayor
John Stead

The 1898 Invercargill mayoral election was held on 1 December 1898 as part of that year's local elections.

Incumbent mayor Hugh Mair was defeated by councillor John Stead.

== Results ==
The following table gives the election results:

1898 Invercargill mayoral election
| Party | Candidate | Votes | % | ±% |
|---|---|---|---|---|
| Independent | John Stead | 415 | 79.65 | |
| Independent | Hugh Mair | 106 | 20.34 | |
| Majority | | 309 | 59.31 | |
| Turnout | | 521 | | |
