= John Walker Mitchell =

New Zealand politician

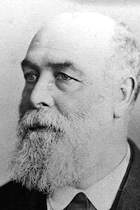

Mayor of Invercargill
- In office 1875–1876
- Preceded by: Thomas Pratt
- Succeeded by: John Cuthbertson
- In office 1889–1890
- Preceded by: Thomas Fleming
- Succeeded by: William Horatio Hall

Personal details
- Born: 1832 Thornhill, Perthshire, Scotland
- Died: 23 July 1914 (aged 81–82)

John Walker Mitchell (1832 – 23 July 1914) was a Scottish-born New Zealand politician. He immigrated to New Zealand from Australia in 1862. He was a losing candidate in the 1871 Invercargill mayoral election and 1895 Invercargill mayoral election. He was twice mayor of Invercargill (1875–1876, 1889–1890) and served as Councillor for two terms (1873–1875, 1887–1889).

== Sources ==
- Cyclopedia Company Limited (1905). The Cyclopedia of New Zealand : Otago & Southland Provincial Districts. Christchurch.
- Watt, John Oman Percival (1971). Centenary of Invercargill Municipality 1871–1971. Invercargill: Times Printing Service.

== Bibliography ==
- The Statutes of New Zealand, page 20.

Political offices
| Preceded by Thomas Pratt | Mayor of Invercargill; 1875–1876; 1889–1890 | Succeeded by John Cuthbertson |
| Preceded by Thomas Fleming | Mayor of Invercargill; 1875–1876; 1889–1890 | Succeeded by William Horatio Hall |
