= Charles Stephen Longuet =

New Zealand mayor

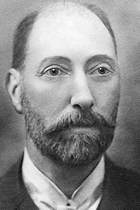
- Charles Longuet

Mayor of Invercargill
- In office 1909–1910
- In office 1901–1902

Personal details
- Born: 1861 Bluff, New Zealand
- Died: 10 October 1941 (aged 80)

Charles Stephen Longuet (1861 – 10 October 1941) was the 27th Mayor of Invercargill from 1901 to 1902, and from 1909 to 1910. He had been on the Borough Council since 1897.

He was born in Bluff and educated in Invercargill. A lawyer, he was called to the bar in 1890 and had been the President of the Law Society.

Political offices
Preceded by James Smith Goldie	Mayor of Invercargill; 1901–1902; 1909–1910	Succeeded by George Froggatt
Preceded by William Benjamin Scandrett	Mayor of Invercargill; 1901–1902; 1909–1910	Succeeded by William Ott
