= James Mackintosh (politician) =

New Zealand politician

James Mackintosh (18 October 1827 – 9 May 1897) was a 19th-century Liberal Party Member of Parliament in Southland, New Zealand.

== Early life ==
He was born in Lochinver, Sutherlandshire, Scotland, and went to Victoria, Australia as a young man with his father. At Moonee Ponds, he and his brother Murdoch Mackintosh were stock-breeders. The 1940 edition of the Dictionary of New Zealand Biography lists him as a representative of East Bourke in the Victoria Legislative Assembly, but this is incorrect and based on a confusion with the similarly named James Macintosh.

Mackintosh married Anne McLean in 1852. Her father owned the Pollio station on the Darling River.

== Life New Zealand ==
New Zealand Parliament
Years	Term	Electorate	Party
1890–1893	11th	Wallace	Liberal
1893–1896	12th	Wallace	Liberal

The Mackintoshs moved to New Zealand in 1866, where he was also a runholder. He first bought the Strathmore estate in the Otautau district, and later the Gladfield estate. He retired from farming in 1884 and moved to Invercargill.

From 1880 until shortly before his death, Mackintosh was a member of the Southland Education Board. He set up the Aparima road board. While obituaries in The Evening Post (Wellington) and The Star (Christchurch) mention his membership of the Southland Provincial Council, his name does not appear on the council's roll compiled by Guy Scholefield in his 1950 edition of the New Zealand Parliamentary Record, 1840–1949. For a time, he was chairman of the Wallace County Council.

Mackintosh stood in the 1887 election in the Mataura electorate and was beaten by the incumbent, George Richardson. He represented the Wallace electorate from the 1890 election for two parliamentary terms.

He was an advocate of cheap government loans for settlers. In the 1896 election, the Wallace electorate was contested by five candidates, and Mackintosh came last.

== Death ==
Annie Mackintosh died on 11 May 1880 in Invercargill. Mackintosh died on 9 May 1897, aged 69. He left seven sons and four daughters.

New Zealand Parliament
Preceded by Samuel Hodgkinson	Member of Parliament for Wallace; 1890–1896	Succeeded by Michael Gilfedder
