= 1923 Invercargill mayoral election =

1923 mayoral election in Invercargill, New Zealand

- 26 April 1923
- Turnout: 5,513
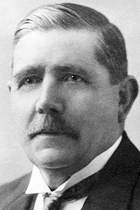
Candidate	Andrew Bain	T. D. Lennie
Party	Independent	Independent
Popular vote	4,004	1,509
Percentage	72.62	27.37
Mayor before election
John Lillicrap
Elected mayor
Andrew Bain

The 1923 Invercargill mayoral election was held on 26 April 1923 as part of that year's local elections.

== Results ==
The following table gives the election results:

1923 Invercargill mayoral election
Party	Candidate	Votes	%	±%
Independent	Andrew Bain	4,004	72.62	
Independent	Thomas Daniel Lennie	1,509	27.37	
Majority		2,495	45.25	
Turnout		5,513		
