= Eve Poole =

New Zealand politician (1924–1992)

Eve Poole QSO
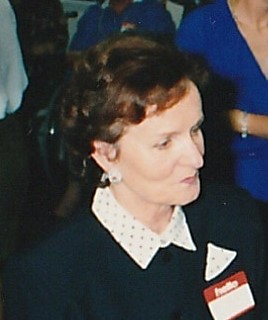
- Poole in 1990

41st Mayor of Invercargill
- In office 1983–1992†

Personal details
- Born: Eva Auerbach; 29 December 1924 Frankfurt, Germany
- Died: 26 December 1992 (aged 67) Dunedin, New Zealand
- Resting place: Eastern Cemetery, Invercargill
- Spouse: Vernon Clive Poole (m. 1943)
- Children: 4
- Military career
- Allegiance: United Kingdom
- Branch: Auxiliary Territorial Service
- Service years: 1939–1945
- Rank: Private
- Service number: 195779
- Conflicts: World War II

Eve Poole QSO (born Eva Auerbach; 29 December 1924 – 26 December 1992) was a New Zealand politician who served as Mayor of Invercargill from 1983 until her death in 1992. She was the first woman and Jew to hold this position.

== Early life ==
Poole was born in Frankfurt, Germany on 29 December 1924 to Polish migrants Hinde and Nachman Auerbach. She was named Eva after her maternal aunt. The family moved to Berlin in the late 1920s. Her father was brutally beaten in a Nazi street demonstration against Jews in 1932, and thus began a years-long struggle to migrate the family to Palestine. While much of Poole's maternal family also made it to Palestine, her father's family was largely wiped out in The Holocaust. Poole and her sister Pnina would often have to give up their beds to fellow refugees that their family would shelter.

Following in the footsteps of many of her older siblings, Poole enlisted in the British Eighth Army as a driver in the Auxiliary Territorial Service, lying about her age on the enrolment form. She was sent to train in Tell El Kebir, getting engaged to a French officer named Jean there. In 1942 she became a driver for Vernon Poole, who was a tank commander in the 20th Battalion of the 2nd New Zealand Division. In developing a relationship with him, she broke off her engagement with Jean. Vernon had also been engaged to a woman named Francie McGoldrick in Invercargill. Eve married Vernon on 1 March 1943 in Cairo, much to the distress of her parents.

Poole received an honourable discharge upon discovering she was pregnant, and was transported by the MS Wanganella to New Zealand. She moved in with her in-laws in Vernon's hometown of Invercargill. Though she had occasionally been called Eve in the past, she started going exclusively by this name to avoid confusion with Vernon's sister Eva. Vernon was soon discharged and two years later they moved into their own home which Vernon had designed and built. Together they had four children, Helen, Vivienne, Michele, and Clive. Having trained at Habima Theatre, Poole went on to teach drama at Southland Girls' High School. She also worked as a speech therapist for the disabled and was fluent in German, English, French, and Hebrew. Throughout the 1950s and 1960s she grew her public profile as an actor and producer with the Invercargill Repertory Society, including such plays as The Rose Without a Thorn, The Shifting Heart, All My Sons, Dangerous Corner, The Potting Shed, and The Miracle Worker.

== Political career ==
Incensed by the suggestion that the Troopers' Memorial be moved, and with advice from brother-in-law and city councillor Percy Poole and former mayoress Mabel Wachner, Poole successfully ran for the Invercargill City Council in 1971. She was only the second woman to ever run for the council, and was the first to be elected. She topped the poll in 1974 and was made Deputy Mayor. As Deputy Mayor, Poole appeared on the New Zealand version of the talk show Beauty and the Beast, through which she met Auckland City Councillor Catherine Tizard, who would go on to become the first female mayor of Auckland in the same year Poole became the first female mayor of Invercargill.

Poole was approached to run for mayor in 1977, but decided against it at that time. She made her first challenge in 1980 but was unsuccessful, losing to the incumbent F. Russell Miller by 400 votes. As she had not also run for re-election to the council, this meant she was out of public office. In the 1982 Queen's Birthday Honours, Poole was appointed a Companion of the Queen's Service Order for public services.

Poole returned to politics in 1983, making a second run for Mayor. She defeated councillors John Russell and Jim Fenton with 56.8 per cent of the vote, becoming the first woman mayor and first Jewish mayor of Invercargill. The 1984 Southland flood occurred early in her first term and she was praised for her response. Her daughter Michele would go on to have a career in emergency management.

As Mayor, Poole was highly involved in the arts. Norman Jones, the National Party MP for Invercargill, described her as having brought nothing but "culture and emotion" to Southland. She was instrumental in the construction of the Invercargill Public Library, which was later named in her honour after her death in 1992. She served as president of the Southland Museum Trust Board, and as a member of the Anderson Park Art Gallery Council and the Queen Elizabeth II Arts Council. She was also dedicated to the brightening and beautifying of the city, planting flowers in the city centre, installing coloured paving stones, and buying secondhand Christmas lights from Regent Street in London. On Dame Catherine Tizard's first official visit to Invercargill as Governor-General, Poole presented her with a painting of Milford Sound from local artist Peter Beadle, of whom Poole was a fan.

While she largely remained neutral on matters of national politics, she was publicly critical of the Rogernomics of the Fourth Labour Government, leading multiple Southland Federated Farmers marches, one of which resulted in Under-Secretary of Finance Trevor de Cleene being pelted with eggs and tomatoes thrown by protestors.

Poole established Invercargill's first sister city relationship with Kumagaya, Japan.

In 1992 she was awarded a Melvin Jones Fellowship by Lions Clubs International.

Poole initially intended to retire at the 1992 election, following the death of her daughter Helen in February, however she announced in July that she would run for a fourth term. It was a close race with deputy mayor Bruce Pagan and councillor Mirek Cvigr, with Poole winning with only 37.86% of the vote.

== Death ==
Only a month after being elected to a fourth term, Poole was admitted to Dunedin Hospital on 25 November 1992 due to severe back pain. She was diagnosed with cancer. Treatment was unsuccessful, and after developing peritonitis when her bowel was perforated during a biopsy, she died on the morning of 26 December 1992 at the age of 67. She is buried at Invercargill's Eastern Cemetery, along with her husband who died on 27 April 2002.

Political offices
Preceded by F. Russell Miller	Mayor of Invercargill; 1983–1992	Succeeded by Tim Shadbolt
