= John Lillicrap =

New Zealand politician (1866–1937)

John Frederick Lillicrap
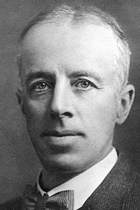
- John Lillicrap

Mayor of Invercargill
- In office 1921–1923
- Preceded by: John Stead
- Succeeded by: Andrew Bain

Personal details
- Born: 1 July 1866 Wellington, New Zealand
- Died: 16 November 1937 (aged 71)

John Frederick Lillicrap (1866–1937) was the 29th Mayor of Invercargill from 1921 to 1923. He had been a Borough councillor from 1901 to 1906 and from 1909 to 1921.

He was born in Wellington in 1866, and moved to Invercargill as a child. His father Captain Vernon Lillicrap was in charge of the Immigration Barracks.

He was a lawyer, and also practised from 1929 to 1936 in Palmerston North. He married Catherine Anne Wilson in 1899; they had one son and one daughter.

Political offices
Preceded by John Stead	Mayor of Invercargill; 1921–1923	Succeeded by Andrew Bain
