= Neil Watson (politician) =

New Zealand politician

Neil Watson OBE
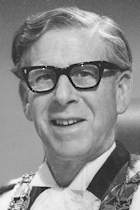

39th Mayor of Invercargill
- In office 1962–1971

Personal details
- Born: Neil Lachlan Watson; 10 December 1905 Invercargill, New Zealand
- Died: 28 April 1990 (aged 84) Rotorua, New Zealand
- Resting place: Eastern Cemetery, Invercargill
- Spouse: Beverley Mitchel (m. 1936)
- Relations: James Alexander Robertson Menzies (grandfather)
- Children: 4
- Education: Victoria University College

Neil Lachlan Watson OBE (10 December 1905 – 28 April 1990) was a New Zealand politician who served as Mayor of Invercargill from 1962 to 1971.

== Early life ==
Watson was born in Invercargill on 10 December 1905. His father, John Lachlan McGillivray Watson, was a lawyer, and his mother, Laetitia Frances Menzies, was the daughter of superintendent of the Southland Province James Alexander Robertson Menzies. He attended Christ's College, and then studied law at Victoria University College. He was admitted to the bar in 1929 and became a partner in his father's law firm the next year. He married Beverley Mitchel in 1936 and they had a daughter and three sons.

== Political career ==
Watson was first elected to the Invercargill City Council in 1950. He was deputy mayor from 1953 until 1962, when he replaced the retiring Adam Adamson as mayor. He served three terms as mayor, overseeing various improvements to the city, including a new airport and new library. He was appointed an Officer of the Order of the British Empire in the 1970 Queen's Birthday Honours, for services to local government.

== Death ==
Watson died in Rotorua on 29 April 1990, aged 84, and was buried at Invercargill's Eastern Cemetery.

Political offices
| Preceded by Adam Adamson | Mayor of Invercargill; 1962–1971 | Succeeded by F. Russell Miller |
