= Abraham Wachner =

New Zealand politician (1892–1950)

Abraham (Abie) Wachner OBE
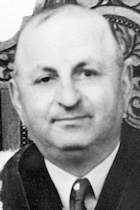

35th Mayor of Invercargill
- In office 1942–1950

Personal details
- Born: 15 August 1892 London, England
- Died: 23 August 1950 (aged 58) Dunedin, New Zealand
- Resting place: Eastern Cemetery, Invercargill
- Spouse: Mabel Christina Rice
- Children: 2

Military service
- Allegiance: New Zealand
- Branch/service: New Zealand Army
- Years of service: 1914–1915
- Battles/wars: World War I World War II

Abraham (Abie) Wachner OBE (15 August 1892 – 23 August 1950) was the 35th Mayor of Invercargill from 1942 to 1950. He was awarded the OBE in 1946.

== Early life ==
He was born in London; his father was a furniture manufacturer of Polish-Jewish ancestry. His family moved to Australia when he was three months old and to New Zealand when he was 15. He was in the New Zealand Expeditionary Force (NZEF) in Egypt and Gallipoli; a bugler in the field ambulance in Egypt, then he was a stretcher-bearer at Gallipoli and was invalided home after an injury at Walker's Ridge. He worked at a Greymouth drapers, then moved to Invercargill about 1919, where he worked in a footwear shop then started his own footwear shop. He was known to give shoes to those in need, and to fire them down stairs to those he did not like; he had fits of temper partly attributable to his war injury. He served in the Military Reserve and Home Guard in World War II.

== Political career ==
He was elected to the Invercargill City Council in 1938, becoming deputy mayor in 1941 and mayor in June 1942 after the previous mayor resigned through illness. He was a colourful and enthusiastic mayor, promoting Invercargill as the Auckland of the South, developing Oreti for recreation and securing the first air service to the city.

== Personal life and death ==
He married Mabel Rice (who he had met while in Greymouth) in 1922. They had two children. He died in Dunedin after a short illness while waiting for an operation, aged 58. He is buried in the Eastern Cemetery, Invercargill.

Political offices
Preceded by John Robert Martin	Mayor of Invercargill; 1942–1950	Succeeded by William Aitchison
