= John Stead (mayor) =

Scottish-born New Zealand politician

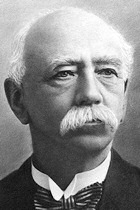

Mayor of Invercargill
- In office 1898–1899
- Preceded by: Hugh Mair
- Succeeded by: James Smith Goldie
- In office 1917–1921
- Preceded by: Duncan McFarlane
- Succeeded by: John Lillicrap

Personal details
- Born: 21 April 1854 Girvan, South Ayrshire, Scotland, United Kingdom
- Died: 26 August 1922 (aged 68)

John Stead (21 April 1854 – 26 August 1922) was a Scottish-born New Zealand politician. He was a losing candidate in the 1894 Invercargill mayoral election and 1896 Invercargill mayoral election. He was deputy mayor of Invercargill from 1915 to 1916 and mayor of Invercargill twice (1898–1899 and 1917–1921). He was the father of All Blacks rugby player Billy Stead.

== Sources ==
- Cyclopedia Company Limited (1905). The Cyclopedia of New Zealand : Otago & Southland Provincial Districts. Christchurch.
- Watt, John Oman Percival (1971). Centenary of Invercargill Municipality 1871–1971. Invercargill: Times Printing Service.

== See also ==
- 1898 Invercargill mayoral election
- 1917 Invercargill mayoral election

Political offices
Preceded by Hugh Mair	Mayor of Invercargill; 1898–1899; 1917–1921	Succeeded by James Smith Goldie
Preceded by Duncan McFarlane	Mayor of Invercargill; 1898–1899; 1917–1921	Succeeded by John Lillicrap
