= John Campbell (mayor) =

Irish politician

Lord Mayor of Dublin
- In office 1871–1872
- Preceded by: Patrick Bulfin
- Succeeded by: Robert Garde Durdin
- In office 1858–1859
- Preceded by: Richard Atkinson
- Succeeded by: James Lambert

Personal details
- Born: County Dublin, Ireland
- Party: Irish Conservative Party

John Campbell was an Irish Conservative Party politician, who served as Lord Mayor of Dublin from 1858 to 1859, and again from 1871 to 1872.

He was a member of Dublin Corporation, and in 1858 became Lord Mayor of Dublin for the first time. He served as lord mayor again in 1871. He was Sheriff of Dublin City in 1877.

Civic offices
Preceded by Richard Atkinson	Lord Mayor of Dublin; 1858–1859	Succeeded by James Lambert
Preceded by Patrick Bulfin	Lord Mayor of Dublin; 1871–1872	Succeeded by Robert Garde Durdin
