= William Benjamin Scandrett =

New Zealand politician

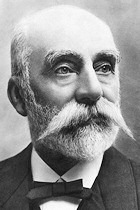

Mayor of Invercargill
- In office 1894–1895
- Preceded by: Andrew Raeside
- Succeeded by: John Sinclair
- In office 1904–1909
- Preceded by: George Froggatt
- Succeeded by: Charles Stephen Longuet
- In office 1912–1913
- Preceded by: William Ott
- Succeeded by: Duncan McFarlane

Personal details
- Born: 7 February 1840 Clapham, London, England
- Died: 23 September 1917 (aged 77) Invercargill, New Zealand

William Benjamin Scandrett (7 February 1840 – 23 September 1917) was a New Zealand politician. He migrated from England to New Zealand in 1855, and moved to Invercargill in 1862. He was the first town clerk of Invercargill after it was proclaimed a municipality, serving from 1871 to 1893. He was deputy mayor of Invercargill twice (1902 and 1911) and mayor of Invercargill three times (1894–1895, 1904–1909 and 1912–1913). Scandrett married Susannah Hinton Milstead and had five children.

== See also ==
- 1894 Invercargill mayoral election
- 1912 Invercargill mayoral election

Political offices
Preceded by Andrew Raeside	Mayor of Invercargill; 1894–1895; 1904–1909; 1912–1913	Succeeded by John Sinclair
Preceded by George Froggatt	Mayor of Invercargill; 1894–1895; 1904–1909; 1912–1913	Succeeded by Charles Stephen Longuet
Preceded by William Ott	Mayor of Invercargill; 1894–1895; 1904–1909; 1912–1913	Succeeded by Duncan McFarlane
