= Duncan McFarlane =

Scottish-born New Zealand politician

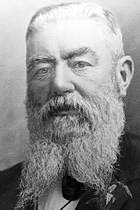

Mayor of Invercargill
- In office 1892–1893
- Preceded by: James Walker Bain
- Succeeded by: Andrew Raeside
- In office 1913–1917
- Preceded by: William Benjamin Scandrett
- Succeeded by: John Stead

Personal details
- Born: 1841 Linlithgow, Scotland
- Died: 20 April 1918 (aged 76–77)

Duncan McFarlane (1841 – 20 April 1918) was a Scottish-born New Zealand politician. He was a losing candidate in the 1908 Invercargill mayoral election. He served three terms as councillor (1888–1992, 1898–1900, 1906–1913). He was mayor of Invercargill twice (1913–1917). His son Duncan McFarlane Jr was mayor of Gore.

Political offices
Preceded by James Walker Bain	Mayor of Invercargill; 1892–1893; 1913–1917	Succeeded by Andrew Raeside
Preceded by William Benjamin Scandrett	Mayor of Invercargill; 1892–1893; 1913–1917	Succeeded by John Stead
