= 1885 Wellington mayoral election =

New Zealand local election

- 25 November 1885
- Turnout: 1,694
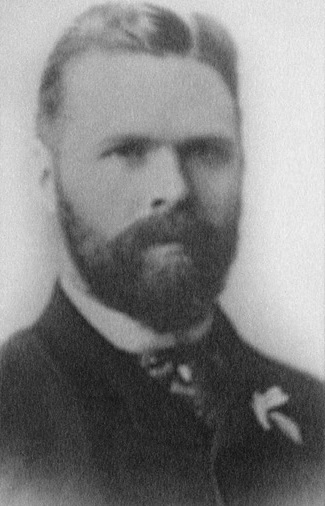

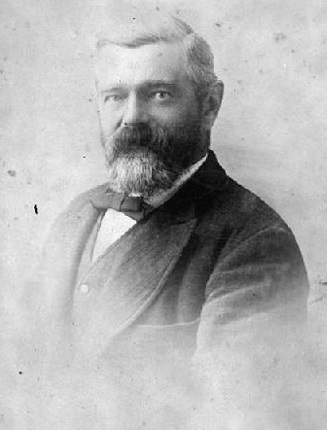

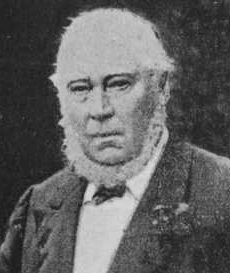
| Candidate | Arthur Brown | Sam Brown | Tommy McKenzie |
| Party | Independent | Independent | Independent |
| Popular vote | 606 | 563 | 435 |
| Percentage | 35.77 | 33.23 | 25.67 |
Mayor before election
George Fisher
Elected mayor
Arthur Winton Brown

The 1885 Wellington mayoral election was part of the New Zealand local elections held that same year to decide who would take the office of Mayor of Wellington.

== Background ==
Incumbent mayor George Fisher retired after four years. Three city councillors (Arthur Winton Brown, Sam Brown and Thomas Wilmor McKenzie) as well as a former mayor (Joe Dransfield) contested the mayoralty.

== Election results ==
The following table gives the election results:

1885 Wellington mayoral election
| Party | Candidate | Votes | % | ±% |
|---|---|---|---|---|
| Independent | Arthur Winton Brown | 606 | 35.77 | |
| Independent | Sam Brown | 563 | 33.23 | |
| Independent | Tommy McKenzie | 435 | 25.67 | |
| Independent | Joe Dransfield | 90 | 5.31 | |
| Majority | | 43 | 2.53 | |
| Turnout | | 1,694 | | |
