= 1886 Wellington mayoral election =

New Zealand local election

- 24 November 1886
- Turnout: 1,509
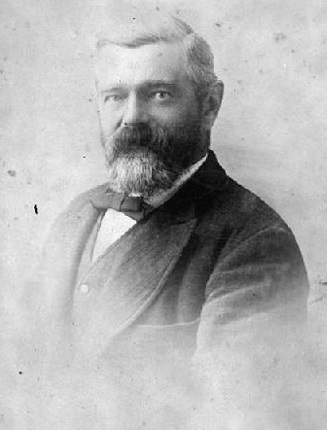

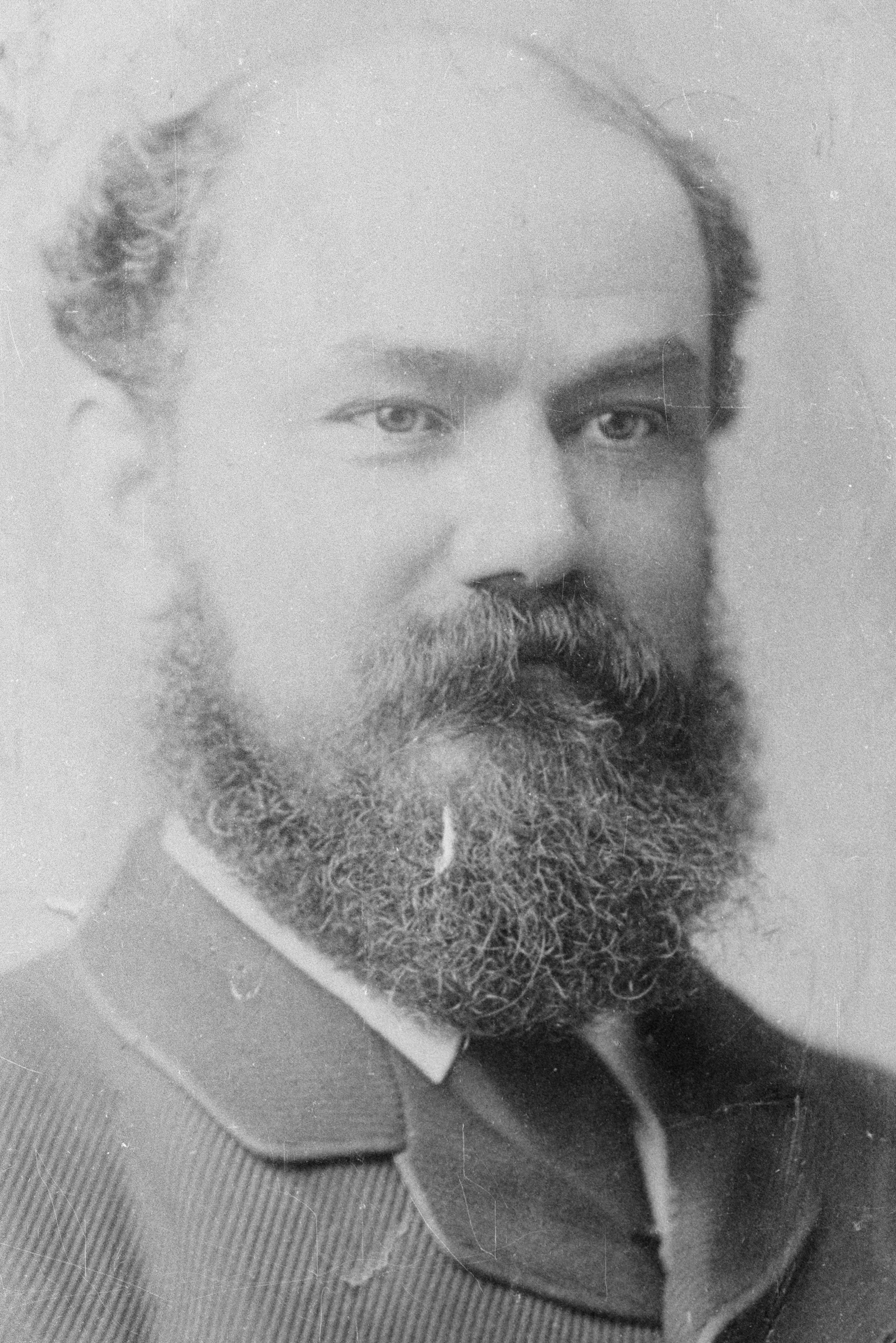
Candidate	Sam Brown	George Fisher
Party	Independent	Independent
Popular vote	864	645
Percentage	57.25	42.74
Mayor before election
Arthur Winton Brown
Elected mayor
Sam Brown

The 1886 Wellington mayoral election was part of the New Zealand local elections held that same year to decide who would take the office of Mayor of Wellington.

== Background ==
Incumbent mayor Arthur Winton Brown retired after one term. In an open race, former mayor Sam Brown defeated former mayor George Fisher.

== Election results ==
The following table gives the election results:

1886 Wellington mayoral election
Party	Candidate	Votes	%	±%
Independent	Sam Brown	864	57.25	+24.02
Independent	George Fisher	645	42.74	
Majority		219	14.51	
Turnout		1,509		
