= 1891 Wellington mayoral election =

New Zealand local election

- 25 November 1891
- Turnout: 1,701
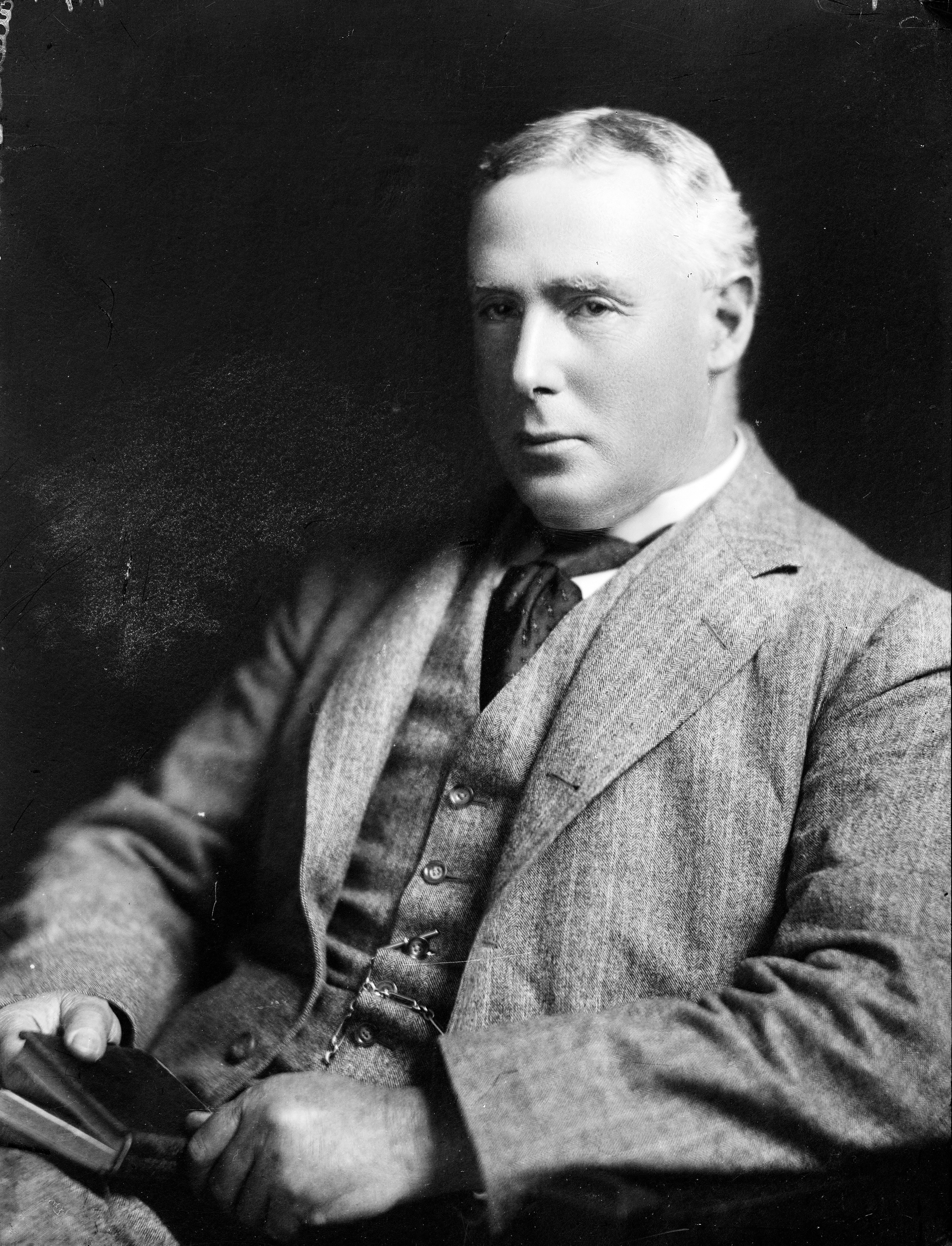

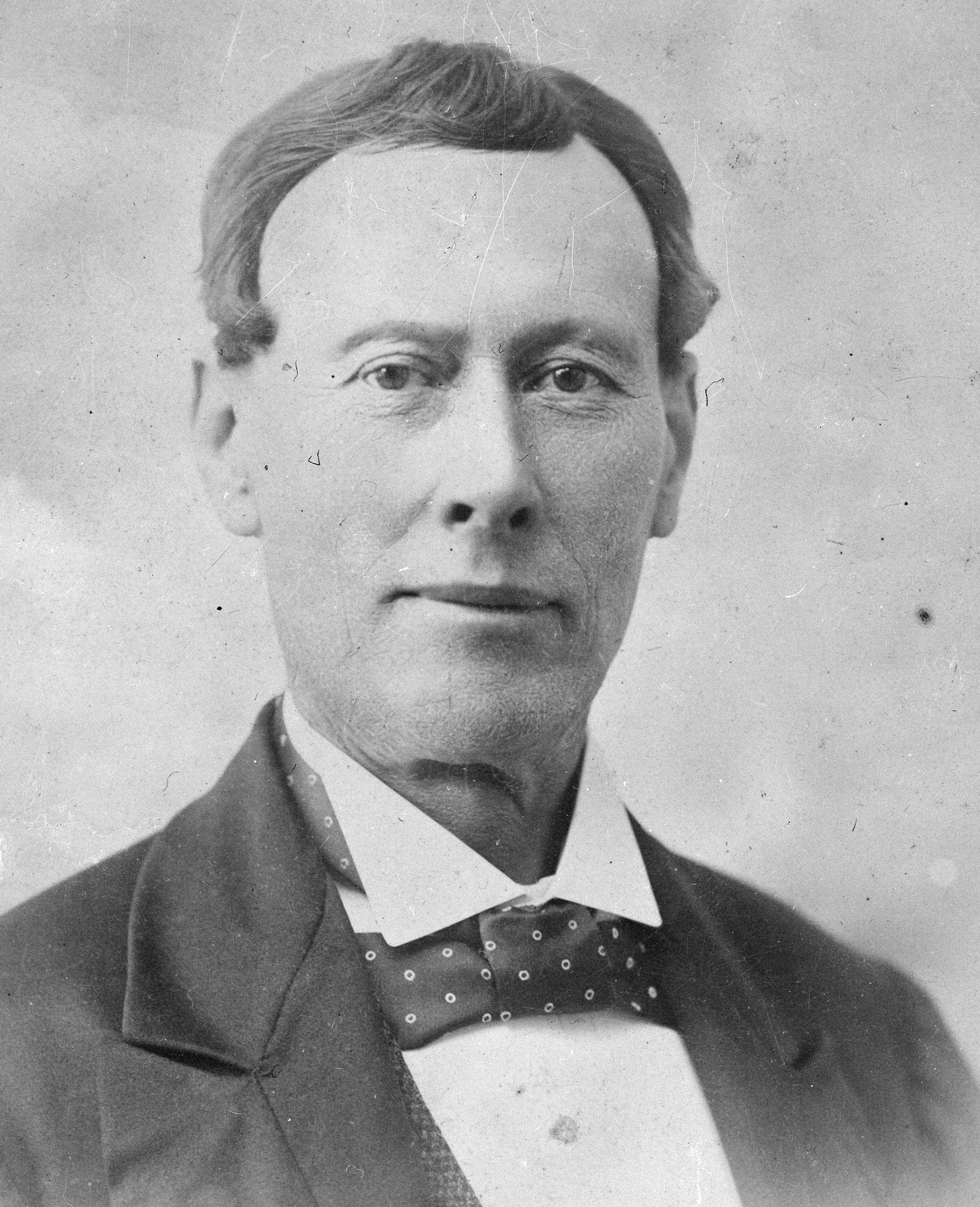
Candidate	Francis Bell	Charles Worth
Party	Independent	Independent
Popular vote	1,060	641
Percentage	62.31	37.69
Mayor before election
Arthur Brown
Elected mayor
Francis Bell

The 1891 Wellington mayoral election was part of the New Zealand local elections held that same year to decide who would take the office of Mayor of Wellington for the following year.

== Background ==
The incumbent mayor, Arthur Winton Brown, declined to stand for re-election. Before he ruled himself out, councillor Charles Frederick Worth (who had opposed Brown in 1890) had announced his candidacy. Brown led a deputation to request that lawyer and candidate at the 1890 election in the City of Wellington electorate, Francis Bell, stand for the mayoralty, which he agreed to do. The election took place during a period when political partisanship was increasing. Bell was a land estate owner and had worked for many years for Conservative Party MP Sir John Eldon Gorst. In contrast, Worth was of a working-class background, had been president of the Working Men's Club in Napier, and had a long association with the Liberal Party.

== Election results ==
The following table gives the election results:

1891 Wellington mayoral election
Party	Candidate	Votes	%	±%
Independent	Francis Bell	1,060	62.31	
Independent	Charles Worth	641	37.69	−3.12
Majority		419	24.62	
Turnout		1,701		
