= 1903 Wellington mayoral election =

New Zealand local election

- 20 April 1903
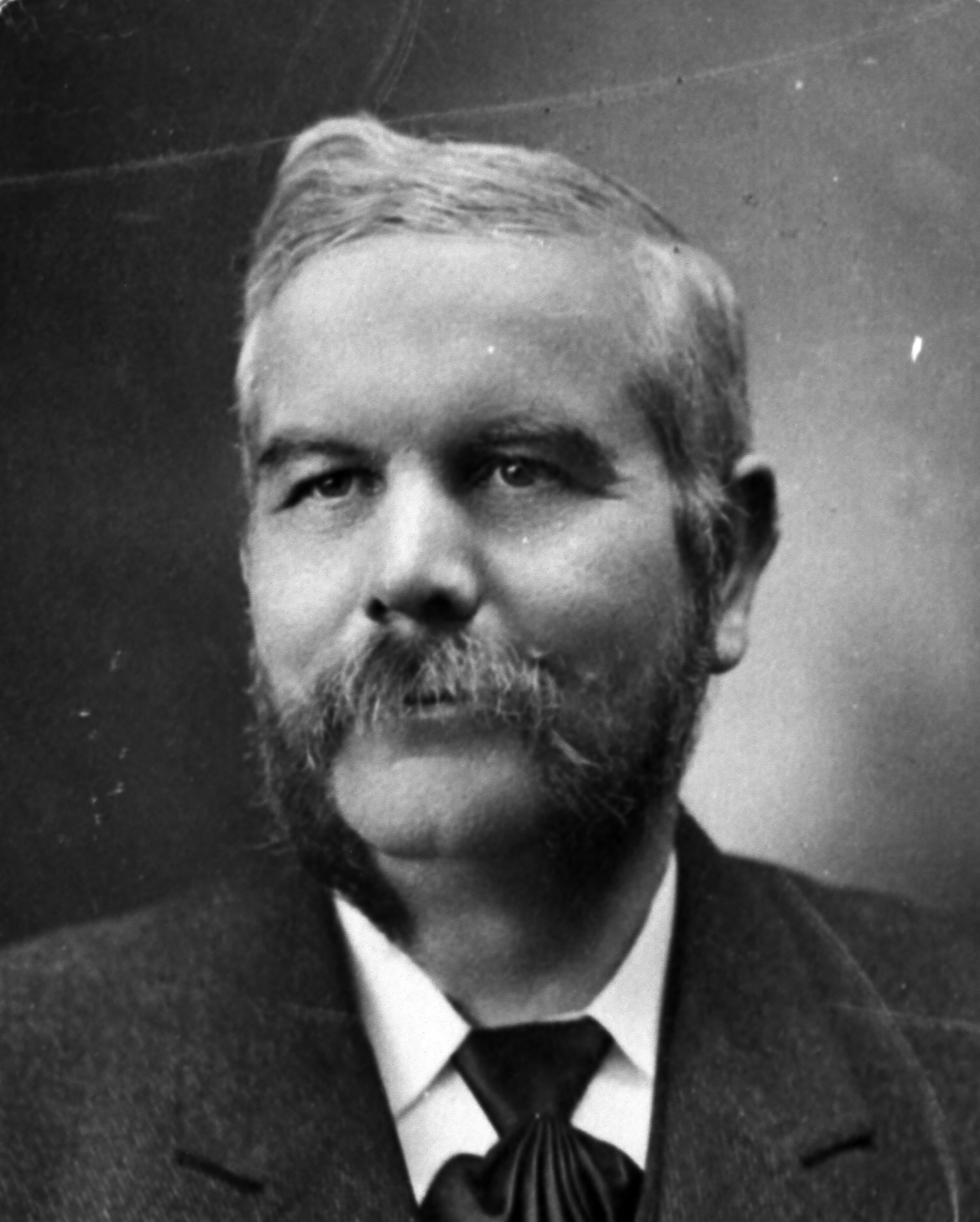
| Candidate | John Aitken |
| Party | Independent |
| Popular vote | elected unopposed |
Mayor before election
John Aitken
Elected mayor
John Aitken

The 1903 Wellington mayoral election was part of the New Zealand local elections held that same year. In 1903, elections were held for the Mayor of Wellington plus other local government positions including the fifteen city councillors, elected biannually. The polling was conducted using the standard first-past-the-post electoral method.

== Background ==
This was the first election following the amalgamation of the Melrose Borough Council into the Wellington City Council following a vote in March 1903. In addition to combining the electoral rolls for the election of mayor, it instituted a ward for the former borough for the term beginning in 1903 to ensure members of the community were elected to the city council. The Wellington Ratepayers' Association had had its organisation become largely moribund following the 1901 election. Despite lacking any regular activity, it advertised a slate of candidates it endorsed for the city council.

John Aitken, the incumbent Mayor, sought re-election for a fourth term in office. A large deputation of businessmen visited Aitken and requested he run again offering support and claiming others also wished him to remain in office longer, as evidenced by Aitken being elected to parliament at the 1902 general election. The next day Aitken stated he had accepted the nomination of the deputation members. The mayor of Melrose, Richard Keene, decided not to run for mayor and only offered himself for election to the Melrose ward of the city council. The Trade Council voted to nominate a candidate to oppose Aitken. It voted to form a deputation to ask a former mayor, Francis Bell, to accept nomination. Ultimately, Aitken retained office unopposed with no other candidates emerging.

== Councillor results ==
Wellington ward

1903 Wellington City Council election, Wellington ward
| Party | Candidate | Votes | % | ±% |
|---|---|---|---|---|
| Ratepayers | George Winder | 2,863 | 93.21 | +18.40 |
| Ratepayers | William Barber | 2,831 | 92.18 | +15.52 |
| Ratepayers | John Luke | 2,826 | 92.02 | +13.36 |
| Ratepayers | William Evans | 2,745 | 89.38 | +14.3 |
| Ratepayers | John Smith Jr. | 2,677 | 87.17 | +23.32 |
| Ratepayers | Matthew Murdoch | 2,610 | 84.98 | +19.52 |
| Ratepayers | James Devine | 2,609 | 84.95 | 23.89 |
| Independent | David Nathan | 2,568 | 83.62 | +23.32 |
| Ratepayers | George Wiltshire | 2,563 | 83.45 | |
| Independent | Charlie Izard | 2,118 | 68.96 | +11.14 |
| Labour | David McLaren | 2,108 | 68.64 | +21.15 |
| Independent | James Godber | 1,953 | 63.59 | +8.19 |
| Ratepayers | Alexander Rand | 1,860 | 60.56 | +38.90 |
| Independent | Robert Tolhurst | 1,665 | 54.21 | |
| Independent | George Anderson | 1,417 | 46.14 | +0.35 |
| Ratepayers | Robert Davenport | 1,268 | 41.28 | +8.20 |
| Independent | George Baylis | 1,015 | 33.05 | |
| Labour | William Hampton | 990 | 32.23 | |
| Ratepayers | William Worth | 905 | 29.46 | |
| Independent | Allan Orr | 799 | 26.01 | −13.92 |
| Independent | William Grant | 756 | 24.61 | |
| Ratepayers | Thomas Orr | 609 | 19.83 | |
| Independent | Vilhelm Jensen | 421 | 13.70 | |
| Turnout | | 3,514 | 32.56 | −49.67 |
| Registered electors | | 10,790 | | |

Melrose ward

1903 Wellington City Council election, Melrose ward
| Party | Candidate | Votes | % | ±% |
|---|---|---|---|---|
| Independent | Albert Jorgensen | 450 | 51.60 | |
| Independent | George Frost | 357 | 40.94 | |
| Ratepayers | Richard Keene | 330 | 37.84 | |
| Ratepayers | Arthur Fullford | 315 | 36.12 | |
| Ratepayers | James Reid | 313 | 35.89 | |
| Independent | John Brown | 289 | 33.14 | |
| Independent | Colin Campbell Crump | 216 | 24.77 | |
| Independent | Walter Morrah | 209 | 23.96 | |
| Independent | William Brannigan | 138 | 15.82 | |
| Turnout | | 872 | 45.96 | |
| Registered electors | | 1,897 | | |
