= 1879 Wellington mayoral by-election =

New Zealand local election

- 27 May 1879
- Turnout: 1,363
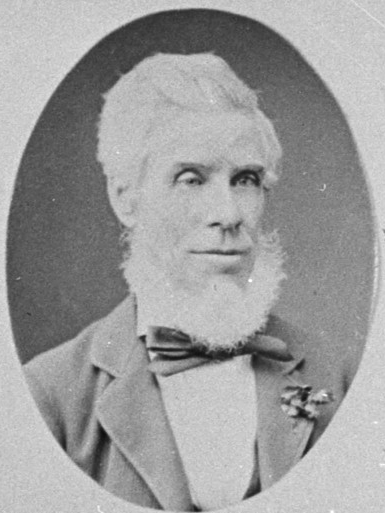

Candidate	William Hutchison	George Hunter
Party	Independent	Independent
Popular vote	699	664
Percentage	51.28	48.72
Mayor before election
George Allen (acting)
Elected mayor
William Hutchison

The 1879 Wellington mayoral by-election was part of the New Zealand local elections held that same year to decide who would take the office of Mayor of Wellington.

== Background ==
Mayor Joe Dransfield resigned in May 1879 owing to bankruptcy. A special meeting of the city council was called on the requisition of three councillors for the purpose of electing a councillor to fulfil the duties of mayor pending the election of a new mayor by the public. Council members elected councillor George Allen to do so. Councillor George Hunter stood against former mayor William Hutchison who was narrowly defeated by Dransfield in 1878.

== Election results ==
The following table gives the election results:

1879 Wellington mayoral by-election
Party	Candidate	Votes	%	±%
Independent	William Hutchison	699	51.28	+1.35
Independent	George Hunter	664	48.72	
Majority		35	2.56	
Turnout		1,363		
