= Mary-Annette Hay =

New Zealand wool promoter and watercolour artist (1925–2024)

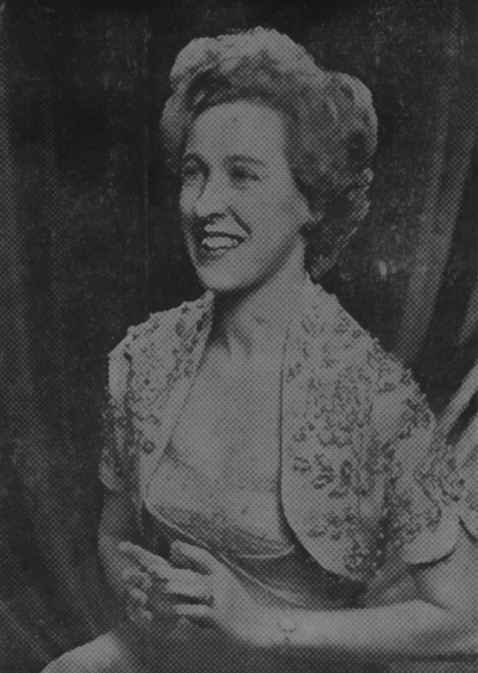
- Burgess, c. 1955
- Born: Mary-Annette Burgess; 13 June 1925
- Died: 30 January 2024 (aged 98); Waikanae, New Zealand
- Relatives: Byron Paul Brown (grandfather); Arthur Winton Brown (great-uncle)

Mary-Annette Hay (née Burgess; 13 June 1925 – 30 January 2024) was a New Zealand wool promoter and watercolour artist.

== Biography ==
She died in Waikanae on 30 January 2024, at the age of 98.
