= 1879 Wellington mayoral election =

New Zealand local election

- 27 November 1879
- Turnout: 1,002
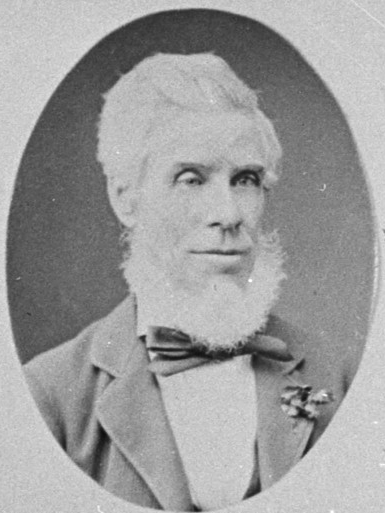

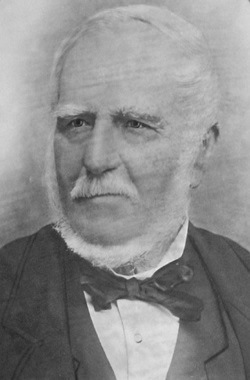
Candidate	William Hutchison	George Allen
Party	Independent	Independent
Popular vote	646	356
Percentage	64.47	35.53
Mayor before election
William Hutchison
Elected mayor
William Hutchison

The 1879 Wellington mayoral election was part of the New Zealand local elections held that same year to decide who would take the office of Mayor of Wellington.

== Background ==
William Hutchison was elected mid-term over councillor George Hunter after Joe Dransfield resigned in May 1879. Councillor George Allen had acted as mayor in the interim, but did not stand at the by-election. However, he did stand this time opposing Hutchison.

== Election results ==
The following table gives the election results:

1879 Wellington mayoral election
Party	Candidate	Votes	%	±%
Independent	William Hutchison	646	64.47	+13.19
Independent	George Allen	356	35.53	
Majority		290	28.94	+26.38
Turnout		1,002		
