= 1888 Wellington mayoral election =

New Zealand local election

- 28 November 1888
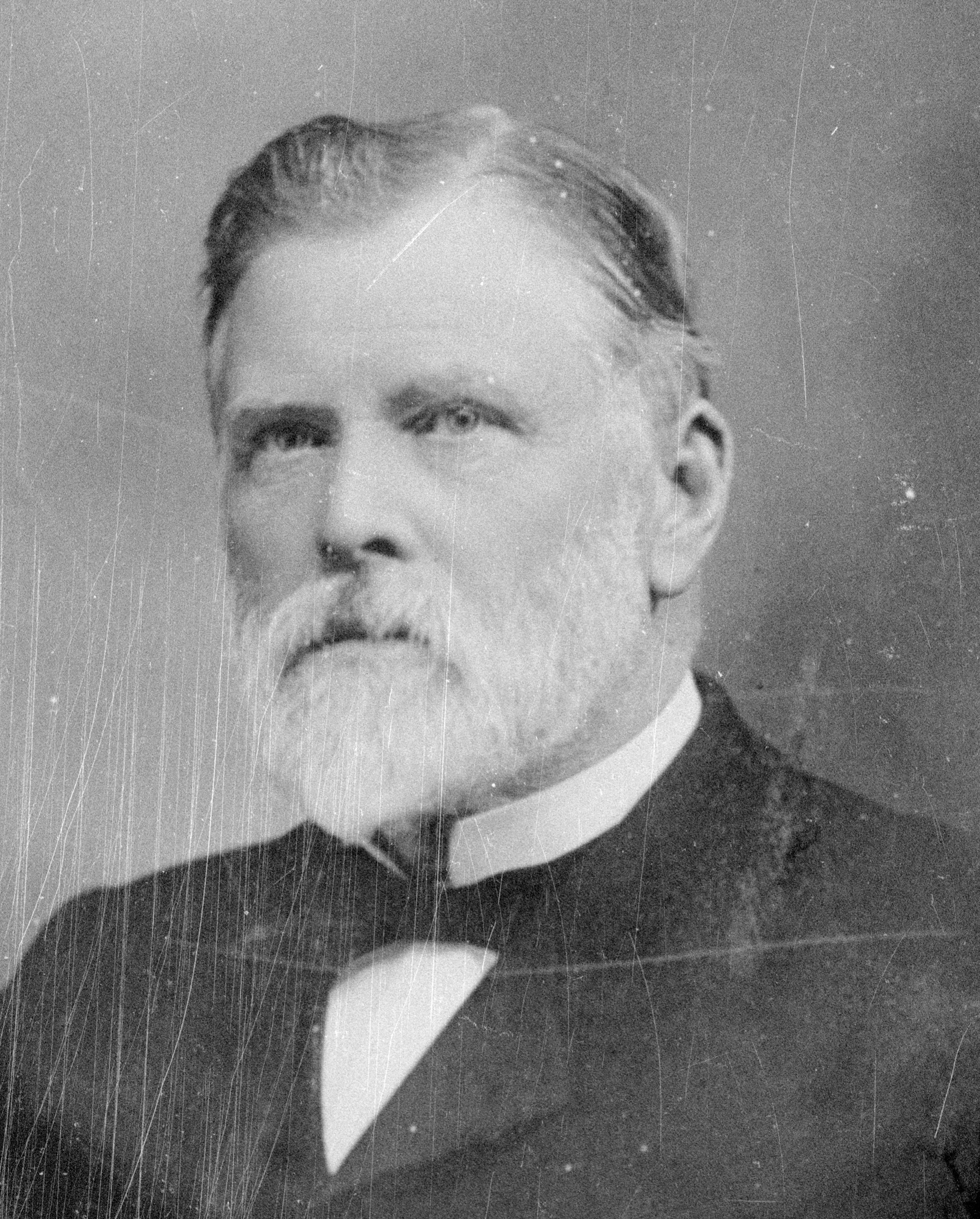

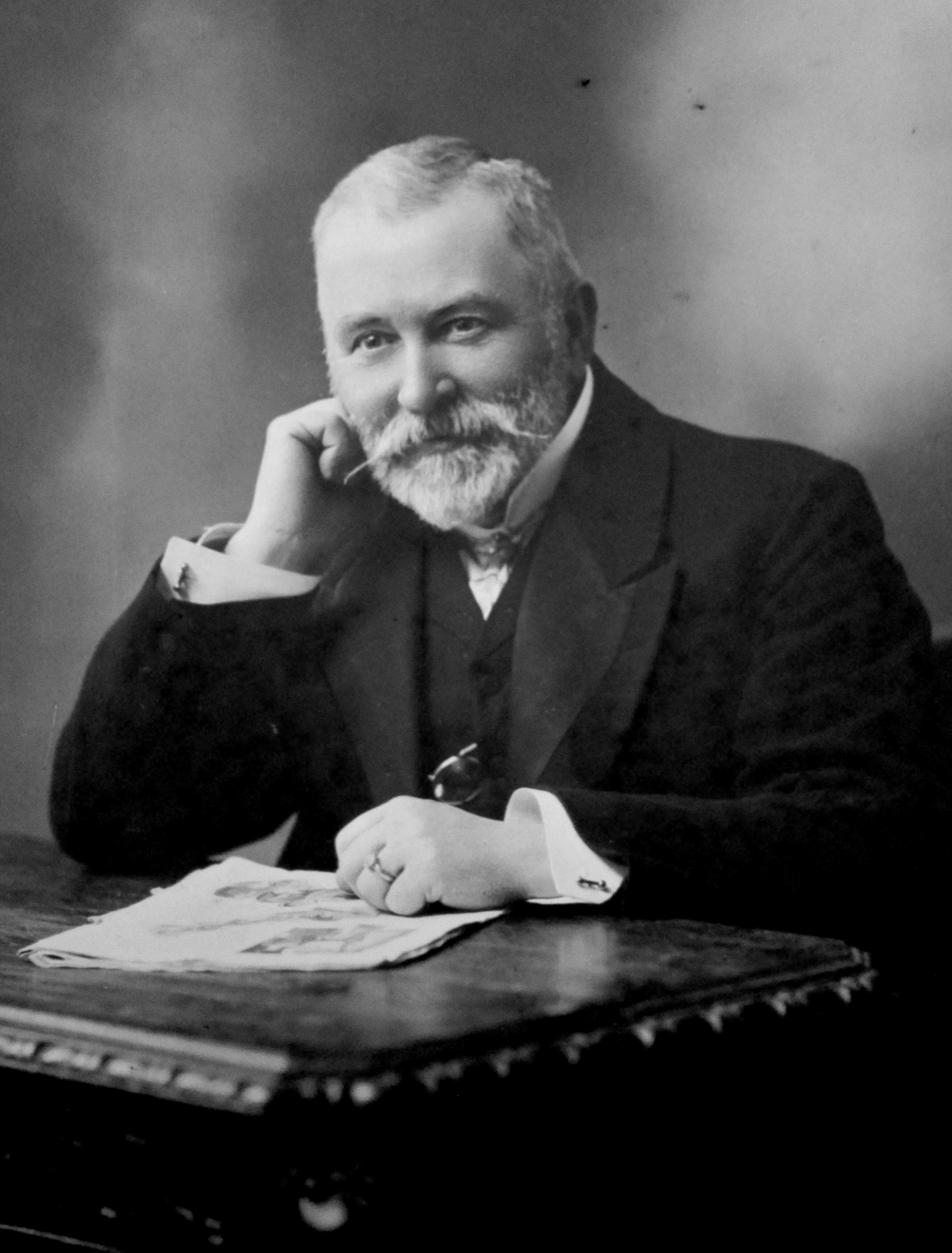
Candidate	John Duthie	Kennedy Macdonald
Party	Independent	Independent
Popular vote	elected unopposed	withdrew
Mayor before election
Sam Brown
Elected mayor
John Duthie

The 1888 Wellington mayoral election was part of the New Zealand local elections held that same year to decide who would take the office of Mayor of Wellington for the following year.

== Background ==
The chairman of the Wellington Harbour Board, John Duthie, was elected mayor unopposed. Initially there was another contestant, former city councillor Kennedy Macdonald, who withdrew from the election meaning a poll was not necessary. It was the first of two successive elections where the mayoralty was uncontested.
