= 1902 Wellington mayoral election =

New Zealand local election

- 16 April 1902
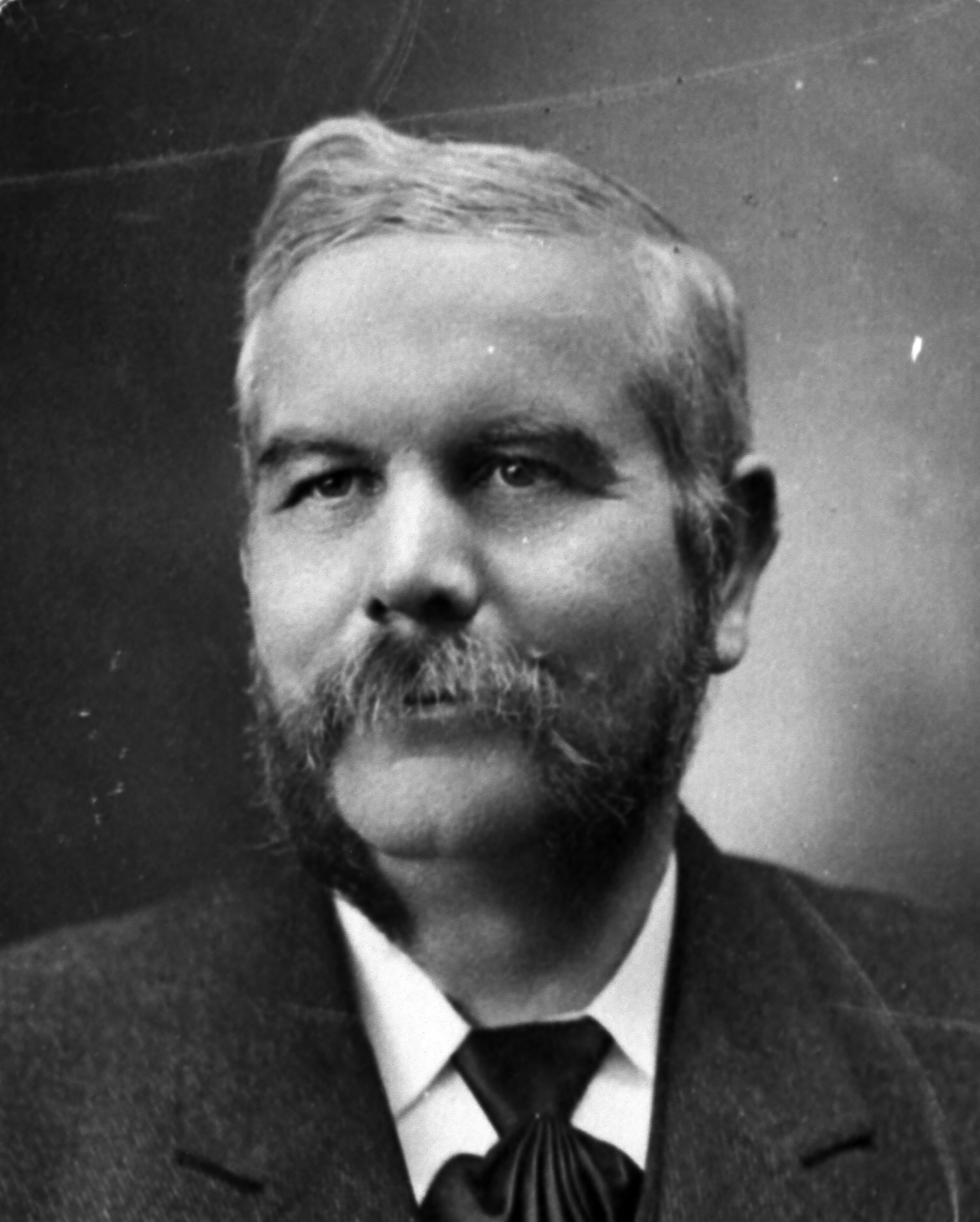
Candidate	John Aitken
Party	Independent
Popular vote	elected unopposed
Mayor before election
John Aitken
Elected mayor
John Aitken

The 1902 Wellington mayoral election was part of the New Zealand local elections held that same year to decide who would take the office of Mayor of Wellington for the following year.

== Background ==
After initially being in doubt as to whether he would seek a third term, incumbent mayor John Aitken allowed his name to go forward to be nominated to stand for re-election. He was returned unopposed as no other candidates were nominated to oppose him. It was the fifth election since 1875 that the mayoralty was uncontested.

The statutory meeting of ratepayers to consider the loan proposals of the city council was held on election day, though attendance at the meeting was low. The ratepayers rejected the proposals by a large majority. This low attendance had become commonplace in local politics and was known as "veto by abstention".
