= 1901 Wellington City Council election =

Local election in New Zealand

- 24 April 1901
- Turnout: 8,533 (82.24%)
- Mayoral election
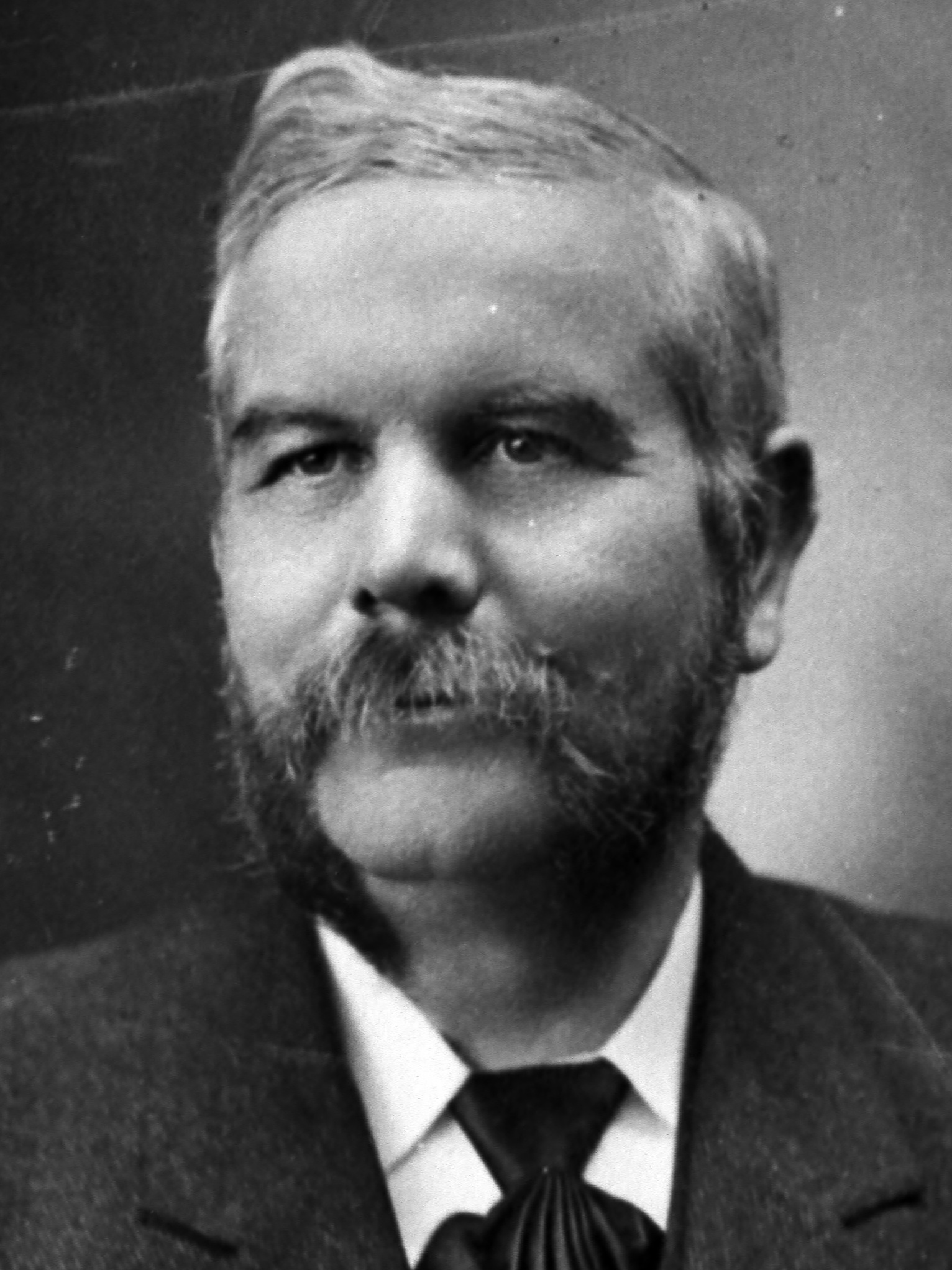

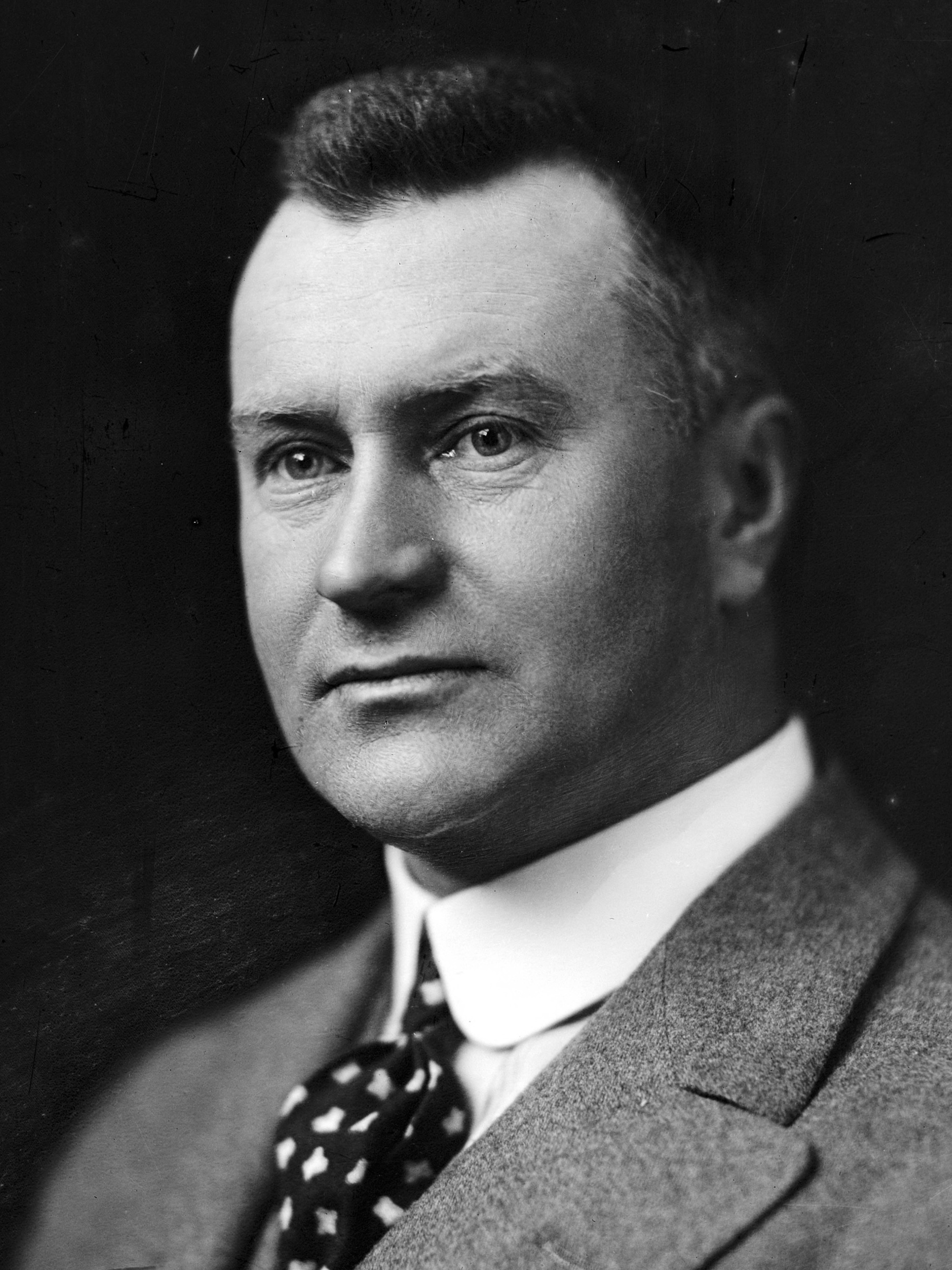
Candidate	John Aitken	Thomas Wilford
Party	Independent	Independent Liberal
Popular vote	5,801	2,732
Percentage	67.98	32.02
Mayor before election
John Aitken
Independent
Elected mayor
John Aitken
Independent
- Council election
- 12 seats on the Wellington City Council; 7 seats needed for a majority
Party	Seats	+/–
Ratepayers / Progressive	6	
Progressive	3	
Ratepayers	2	
Independent Labour / Progressive	1	
This lists parties that won seats. See the complete results below.

The 1901 Wellington City Council election was a local election held on 24 April in Wellington, New Zealand as part of that year's nation-wide local elections. Voters elected the mayor of Wellington for a one-year term and 15 city councillors for a two-year term. In person voting and the first-past-the-post voting system were used.

== Background ==
Electoral reforms were implemented in 1901, which extended the municipal term for councillors to biennial terms and saw the abolition of the ward system, implementing the process of electing councillors at large instead.

Ticket voting began in the city, bringing political competition in civic affairs with electors voting en bloc. A Ratepayers' Association was founded in 1899 opposing several of the then mayor, John Rutherfurd Blair's, policies. Initially more of a pressure group, the association grew into a municipal ticket that claimed "The advancing of public enterprise likely to be for the public benefit" as it core policy belief. It was not wholly opposed to change but it favoured caution and defend the interests of the ratepayer in the new electoral environment in which the franchise had been widened. In 1901, a rival organisation, the Wellington Municipal Progressive Association, was established. It supported a more active policy for the city and promoted the interests of newly enfranchised voters. Both tickets interest-group activities were insufficient to maintain them outside of an election period. By 1902 both had largely faded away.

== Candidates ==
=== Wellington Ratepayers' Association ===
The Wellington Ratepayers' Associations endorsed 12 candidates, including William Henry Peter Barber, Frederick Bolton, Paul Coffey, Robert Davenport, James Devine, James Godber, John Luke, Matthew Murdoch, David Nathan, Allan Orr, John Smith Jr., and George Winder.

=== Municipal Progressive Association ===
The Municipal Progressive Association endorsed the incumbent mayor John Aitken for re-election, as well as 12 candidates for council. These included William Henry Peter Barber, William Evans, James Godber, Alfred Hindmarsh, Charlie Izard, John Luke, Matthew Murdoch, Robert McKenzie, David McLaren, Robert Tolhurst, John Smith Jr., and George Winder.

=== Independent Labour ===
Candidates with connections to the organised labour and trade union movement included David McLaren, Robert McKenzie, Allan Orr, Paul Coffey, Edmond Carrigan, and Alfred Hindmarsh.

== Results ==
The results of the election were:

1901 Wellington City Council election
Party	Candidate	Votes	%	±%
Ratepayers	David Nathan	5,847	86.51	
Ratepayers/Progressive	John Luke	5,316	78.66	
Ratepayers/Progressive	William Barber	5,170	76.50	
Progressive	William Evans	5,074	75.08	
Ratepayers/Progressive	George Winder	5,056	74.81	
Ratepayers/Progressive	Matthew Murdoch	4,424	65.46	
Ratepayers/Progressive	John Smith Jr.	4,315	63.85	
Ratepayers	James Devine	4,127	61.06	
Progressive	Charlie Izard	3,908	57.82	
Ratepayers/Progressive	James Godber	3,744	55.40	
Progressive	Robert Tolhurst	3,640	53.86	
Labour/Progressive	David McLaren	3,210	47.49	
Labour/Progressive	Robert McKenzie	3,035	44.90	
Independent	Frederic Townsend	2,955	43.72	
Independent	George Anderson	2,755	40.76	
Labour/Ratepayers	Allan Orr	2,699	39.93	
Labour/Ratepayers	Paul Coffey	2,491	36.86	
Ratepayers	Robert Davenport	2,236	33.08	
Ratepayers	Frederick Bolton	2,189	32.39	
Independent	Henry Fielder	2,084	30.83	
Labour	Edmond Carrigan	2,033	30.08	
Labour/Progressive	Alfred Hindmarsh	2,028	30.00	
Independent	Alexander Rand	1,464	21.66	
Independent	Alexander Wilson	1,299	19.22	
Turnout		8,533		
Registered electors		10,376		
