= 1884 Wellington mayoral election =

New Zealand local election

- 26 November 1884
- Turnout: 1,053 (44.15%)
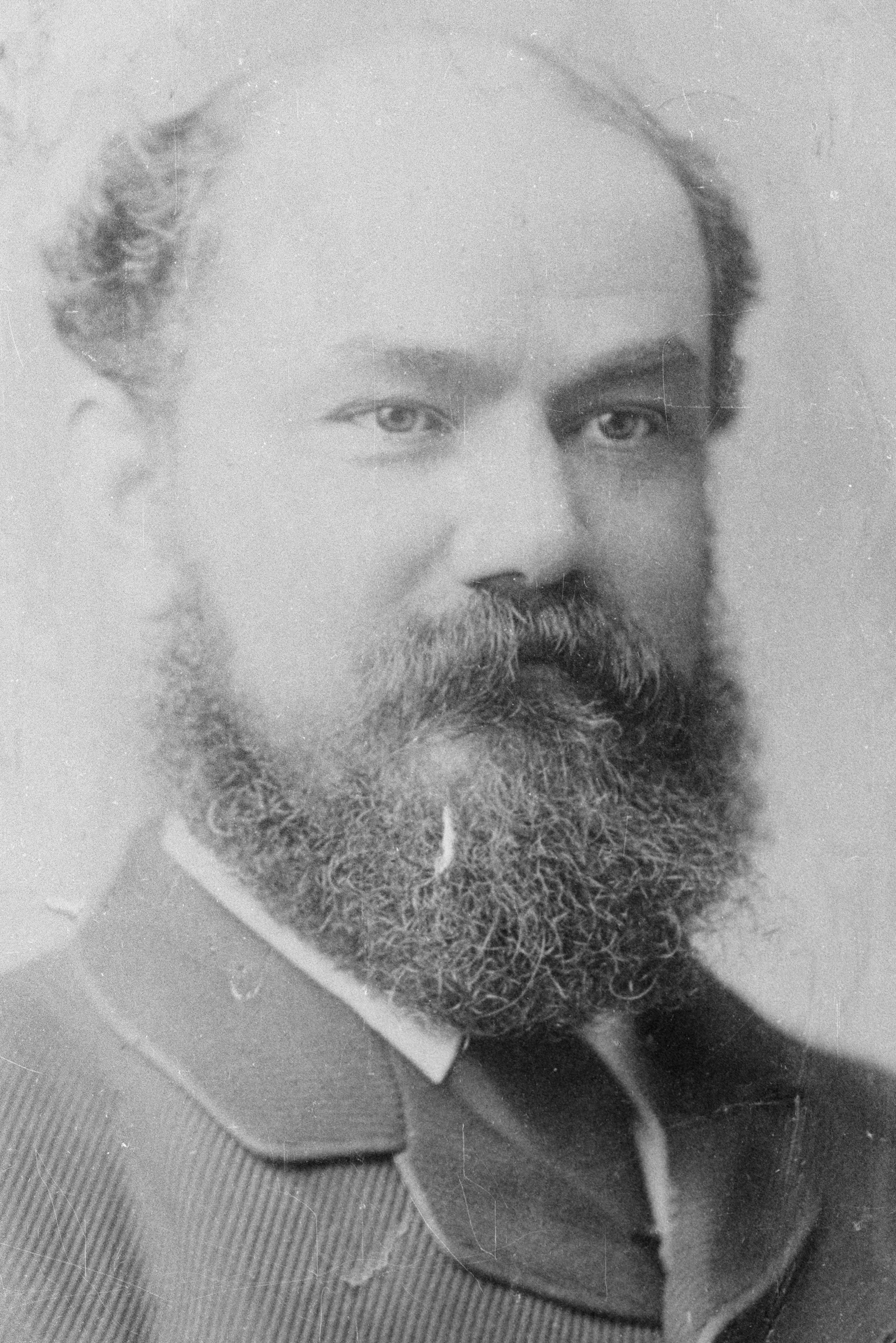

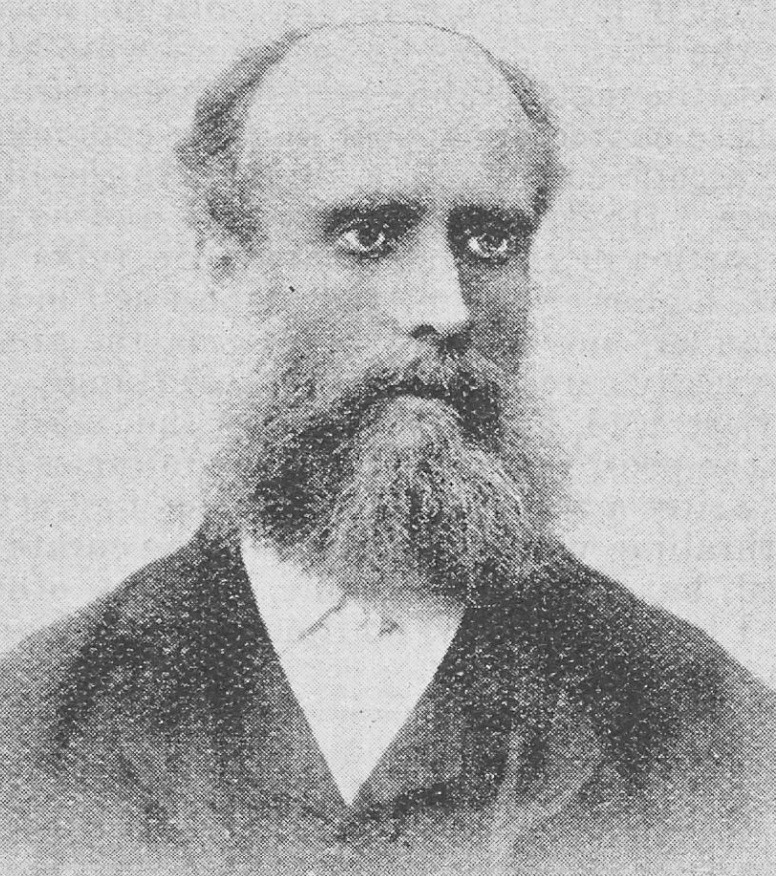
Candidate	George Fisher	James Petherick
Party	Independent	Independent
Popular vote	576	405
Percentage	38.46	38.46
Mayor before election
George Fisher
Elected mayor
George Fisher

The 1884 Wellington mayoral election was part of the New Zealand local elections held that same year to decide who would take the office of Mayor of Wellington.

== Background ==
Incumbent mayor George Fisher sought re-election for a fourth term and was successful, seeing off challenges from councillor James Petherick Jr. and former mayor George Allen. There was a large number of protest votes cast against Fisher with many voters thinking he had been mayor for long enough as well as taking exception to him reneging on a pledge at the previous election that he would not stand again. As such, while Fisher was re-elected, his large majorities from previous elections was cut dramatically.

== Election results ==
The following table gives the election results:

1884 Wellington mayoral election
Party	Candidate	Votes	%	±%
Independent	George Fisher	576	54.70	−17.09
Independent	James Petherick	405	38.46	
Independent	George Allen	72	6.84	
Majority		171	16.23	−27.35
Turnout		1,053	44.15	−12.44
