= 1901 Wellington mayoral election =

New Zealand local election

- 25 April 1901
- Turnout: 8,533 (62.46%)
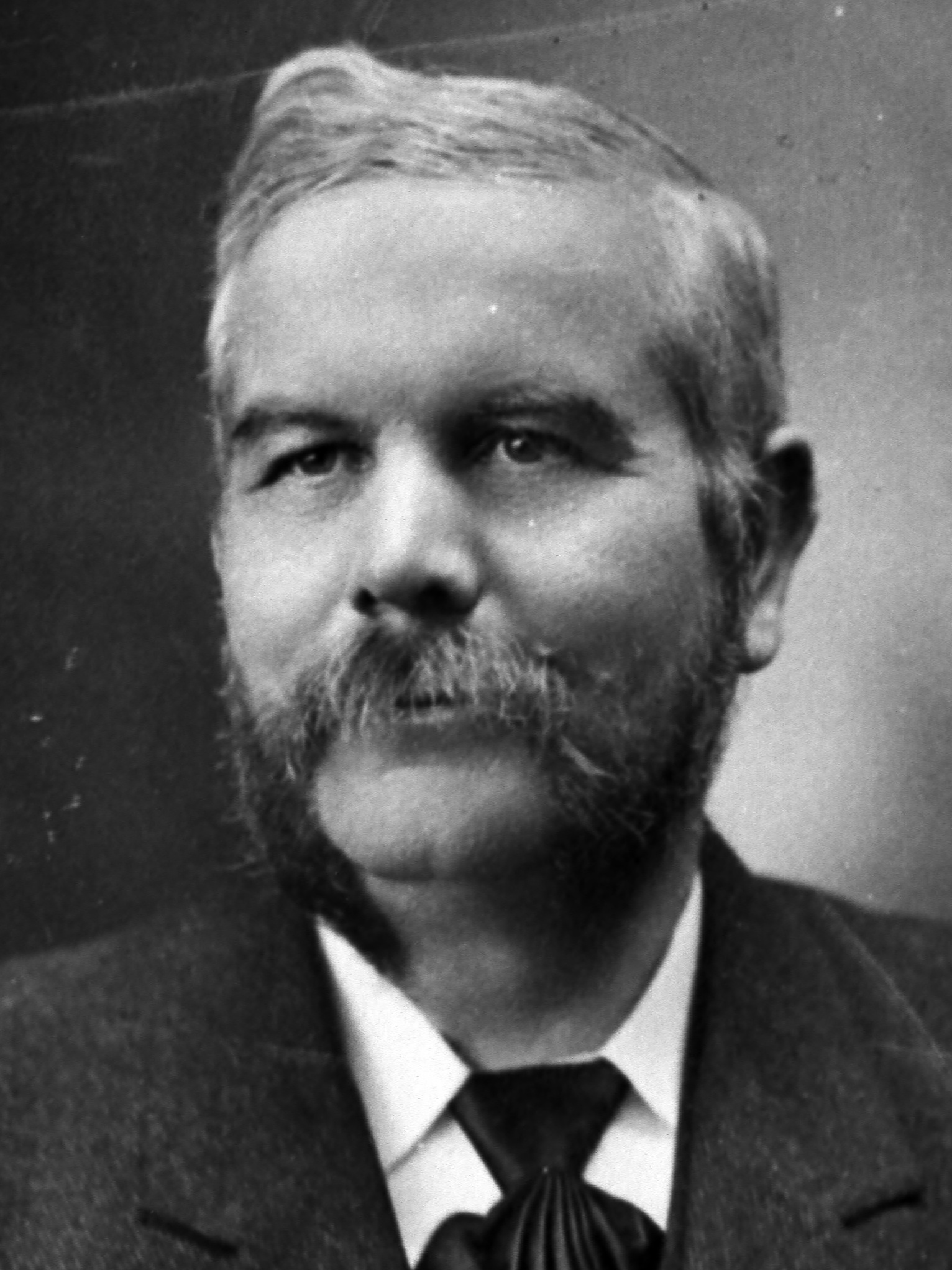

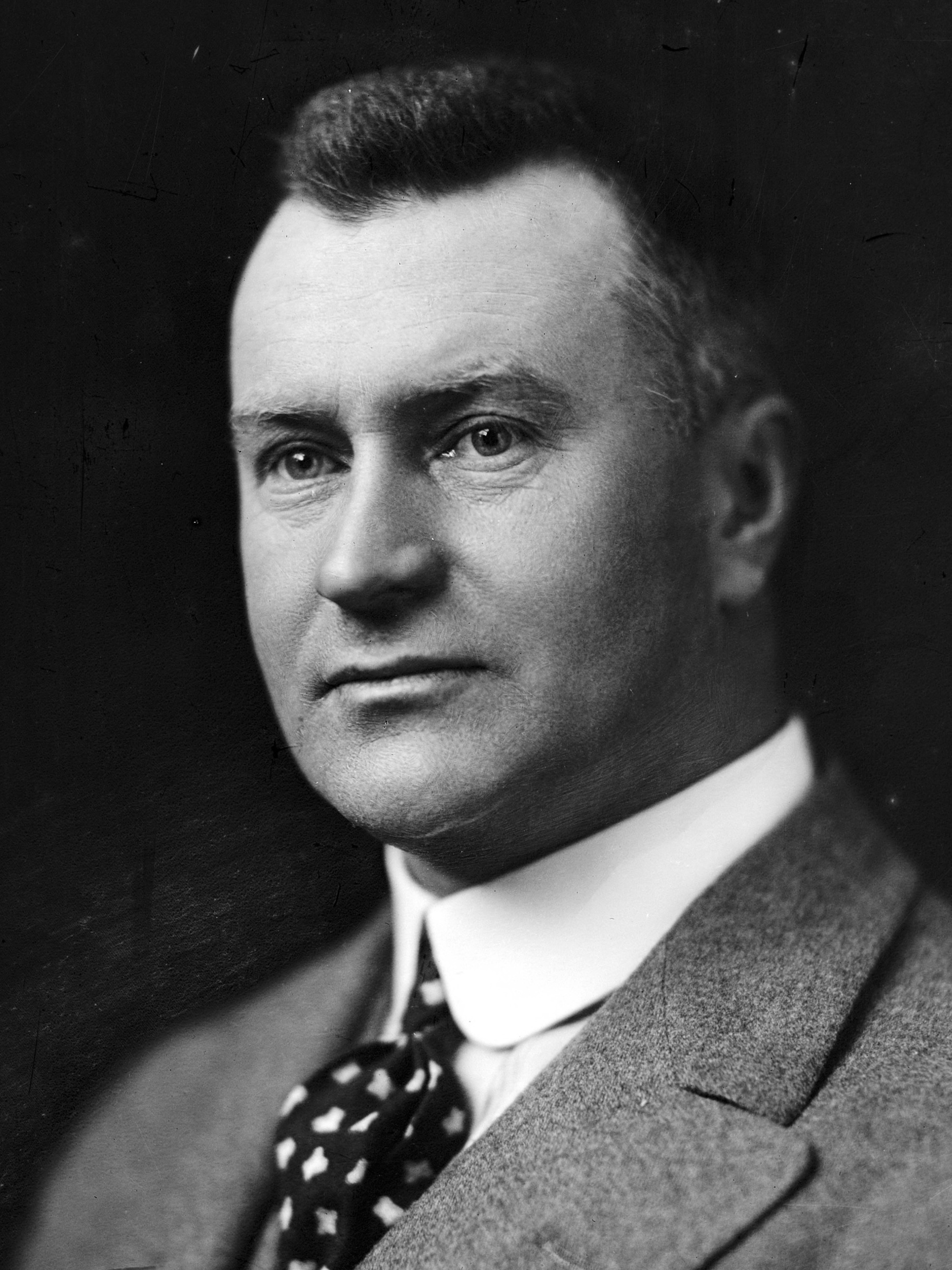
Candidate	John Aitken	Thomas Wilford
Party	Independent	Independent Liberal
Popular vote	5,801	2,732
Percentage	67.98	32.02
Mayor before election
John Aitken
Elected mayor
John Aitken

The 1901 Wellington mayoral election was a local election held on 24 April in Wellington, New Zealand, as part of that year's city council election and nation-wide local elections. Voters elected the mayor of Wellington for a one year term. In person voting and the first-past-the-post voting system were used.

John Aitken, the incumbent Mayor, was re-elected to office as Mayor of Wellington, beating Thomas Wilford.

== Background ==
Electoral reforms were implemented in 1901, which extended the municipal term for councillors to biennial terms and saw the abolition of the ward system, implementing the process of electing councillors at large instead. Under the Municipal Corporations Act, 1900 mayors were still to be elected annually and fixed elections to the last Wednesday in April (rather than in November). The Act delayed the introduction of the new system until April 1901 meaning there was no mayoral election in 1900.

== Mayoralty results ==
1901 Wellington mayoral election
Party	Candidate	Votes	%	±%
Independent	John Aitken	5,801	67.98	+16.65
Independent Liberal	Thomas Wilford	2,732	32.02	
Majority		3,069	35.96	+14.96
Turnout		8,533	62.46	+23.06

== Council results ==
Candidates were also elected for the 12 members of the Wellington City Council.

Party/ticket	Councillors
Ratepayers/Progressive	6
Progressive	3
Ratepayers	2
Labour/Progressive	1
