= George Hunter (politician, born 1821) =

New Zealand politician (1821–1880)

George Hunter (1821 – 6 August 1880) was a New Zealand 19th century politician.

== Biography ==
New Zealand Parliament
Years	Term	Electorate	Party
1871–1875	5th	City of Wellington	Independent
1875–1879	6th	City of Wellington	Independent

Hunter was born in Banffshire, Scotland, in 1821. He was the eldest son of George Hunter, the first Mayor of Wellington. He came to New Zealand with his parents, six sisters, and three brothers. He worked in his father's business as a general merchant and shipping agent. His father died in 1843, his father's business partner Kenneth Bethune died in 1855, and Hunter became sole proprietor of the business.

Hunter was appointed to the Legislative Council of the Province of New Munster in 1848. He was first elected to the Wellington Provincial Council on 5 November 1857 for the City of Wellington electorate, and served until the abolition of provincial government in October 1876. He was a member of the Wellington Executive Council in 1858, in 1871, and in 1873.

He represented the City of Wellington electorate from 1871 to 1879, when he was defeated by William Hutchison. He also sat on the Wellington City Council until 1879, and was defeated by Hutchison when he stood for the Wellington mayoralty in a by-election.

"In the early days of the settlement Geo. Hunter II was the chief proprietor of the Island Bay estate and on his stud farm at the bay bred stock and exhibited successfully ... The Island Bay portion was subdivided by the partners and offered for sale by auction by Messrs. Bethune & Co., in March, 1879 ..."

Hunter also had a farm in Te Aro, which is now part of the Wellington central business district. The central part of his land is now covered by Upper Dixon Street, Percival Street, and Macdonald Crescent. Hunter had a further 15,000 acres (6,100 ha) farm in Porangahau in the Hawke's Bay Region, which he took up in circa 1854. Through purchasing neighbouring land, he increased the size to 32,000 acres (13,000 ha). Hunter lived in Wellington, and the Porangahau farm was run by his brothers David and William. Sheep numbers increased rapidly, from an initial flock of 500 to 27,000 by 1875. A new shearing shed was built in 1876, and with 30 stands, it is one of the largest ever built in the North Island. Now known as the woolshed, it is listed as a Category I heritage structure by Heritage New Zealand. A chapel built by Hunter in the 1870s near the homestead is registered as a Category II heritage structure.

His son, also named George Hunter, took over the running of the farm from his uncles in 1877. He was later joined by his younger brother Paul.

Hunter was married to a sister of Major James Paul, who was later Serjeant-at-Arms of the House of Representatives (1877–1880). His wife died in 1868. Hunter died after a short illness at his home in Wellington's Dixon Street on 6 August 1880. His wife and three daughters had died before him; he was survived by two sons and two daughters. His funeral was attended by nearly 100 members of both Houses of Parliament. He was buried at Bolton Street Cemetery.

His son George Hunter was also an MP.

== Notes ==
New Zealand Parliament
Preceded by William Waring Taylor; Isaac Featherston; Charles Borlase	Member of Parliament for City of Wellington; 1871–1879; Served alongside: Edward Pearce, William Travers, George Elliott Barton	Succeeded by William Hutchison; William Levin
