= Byron Brown (philanthropist) =

New Zealand businessman

Byron Paul Brown
- Born: 8 July 1866; Wellington, New Zealand
- Died: 21 August 1947 (aged 81)
- Occupations: Storekeeper, businessman, community leader, broadcaster, entrepreneur, philanthropist
- Known for: Early New Zealand retail and community broadcasting work
- Relatives: Arthur Winton Brown (brother, Mayor of Wellington); Mary-Annette Hay (granddaughter)

Byron Paul Brown (8 July 1866 – 21 August 1947) was a New Zealand storekeeper, businessman, community leader, broadcaster, entrepreneur and philanthropist. He was born in Wellington, New Zealand on 8 July 1866.

Brown's brother, Arthur Winton Brown was a mayor of Wellington. His granddaughter was Mary-Annette Hay.
