= 1874 Wellington mayoral election =

First popular New Zealand local election

- 17 December 1874
- Turnout: 1,516
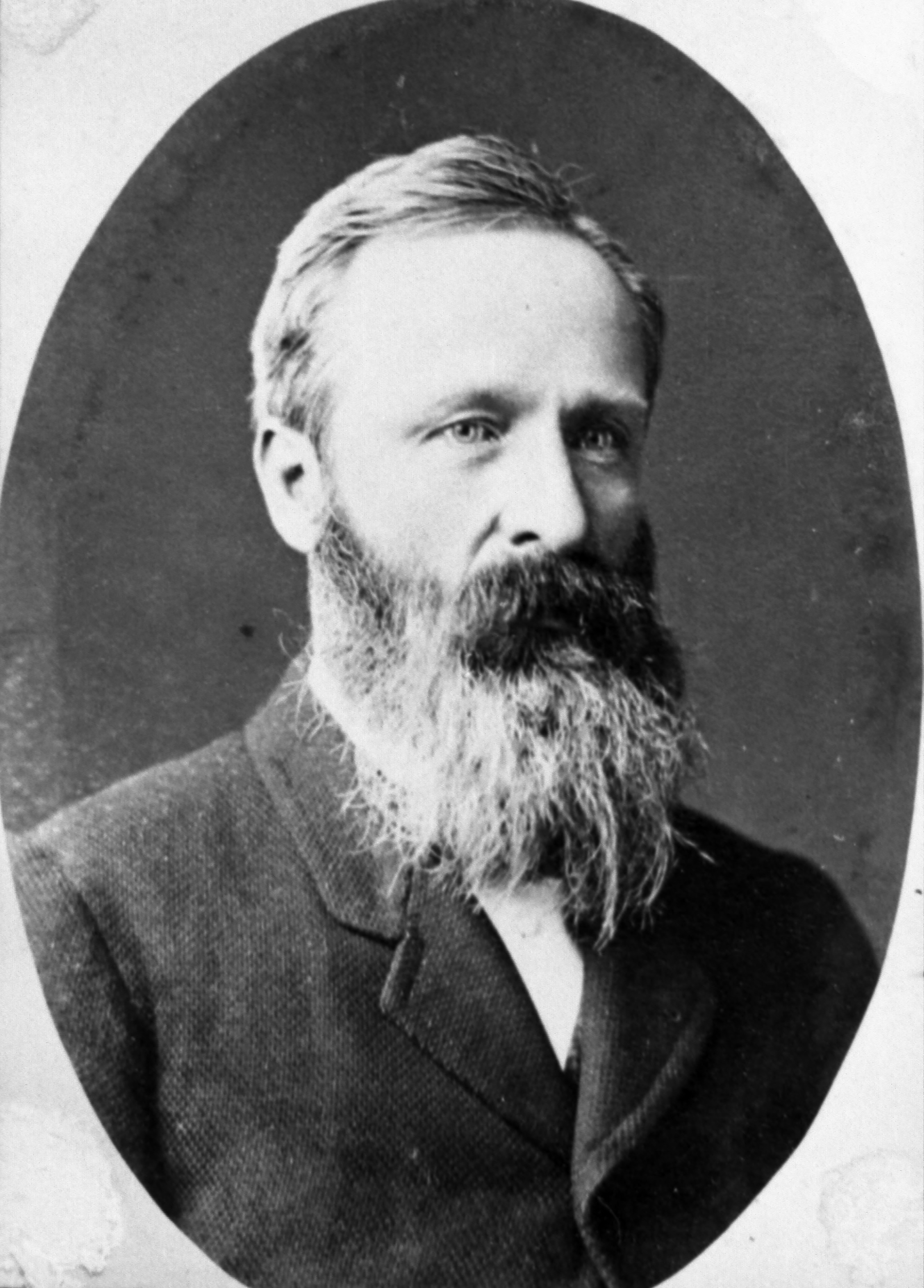

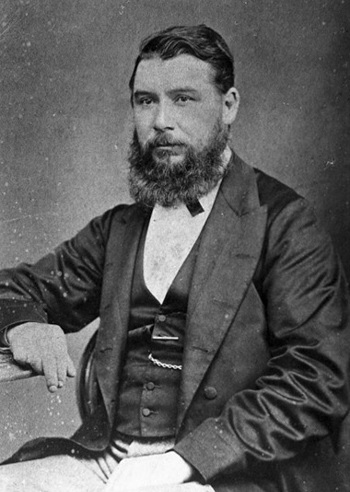
Candidate	William Sefton Moorhouse	Joe Dransfield
Party	Independent	Independent
Popular vote	1,009	507
Percentage	66.55	33.46
Mayor before election
Charles Borlase
Elected mayor
William Sefton Moorhouse

The 1874 Wellington mayoral election was the first election for the Mayor of Wellington to be conducted by public vote. The election was won by William Sefton Moorhouse, who defeated former mayor Joseph Dransfield.

== Background ==
Prior conventions dictated that Wellington's mayors were chosen by the city councillors from amongst themselves. In December 1874 an election open to the voting public was held with the intention of ratepayers selecting who would occupy the office of mayor for the 1875 term. The election was held on 17 December and saw William Sefton Moorhouse defeat Joe Dransfield by a 2 to 1 vote margin.

== Election results ==
The following table gives the election results:

1874 Wellington mayoral election
Party	Candidate	Votes	%	±%
Independent	William Sefton Moorhouse	1,009	66.55	
Independent	Joe Dransfield	507	33.46	
Majority		502	33.11	
Turnout		1,516		
