= Inverlochy House =

Historic building and art school in Wellington, New Zealand

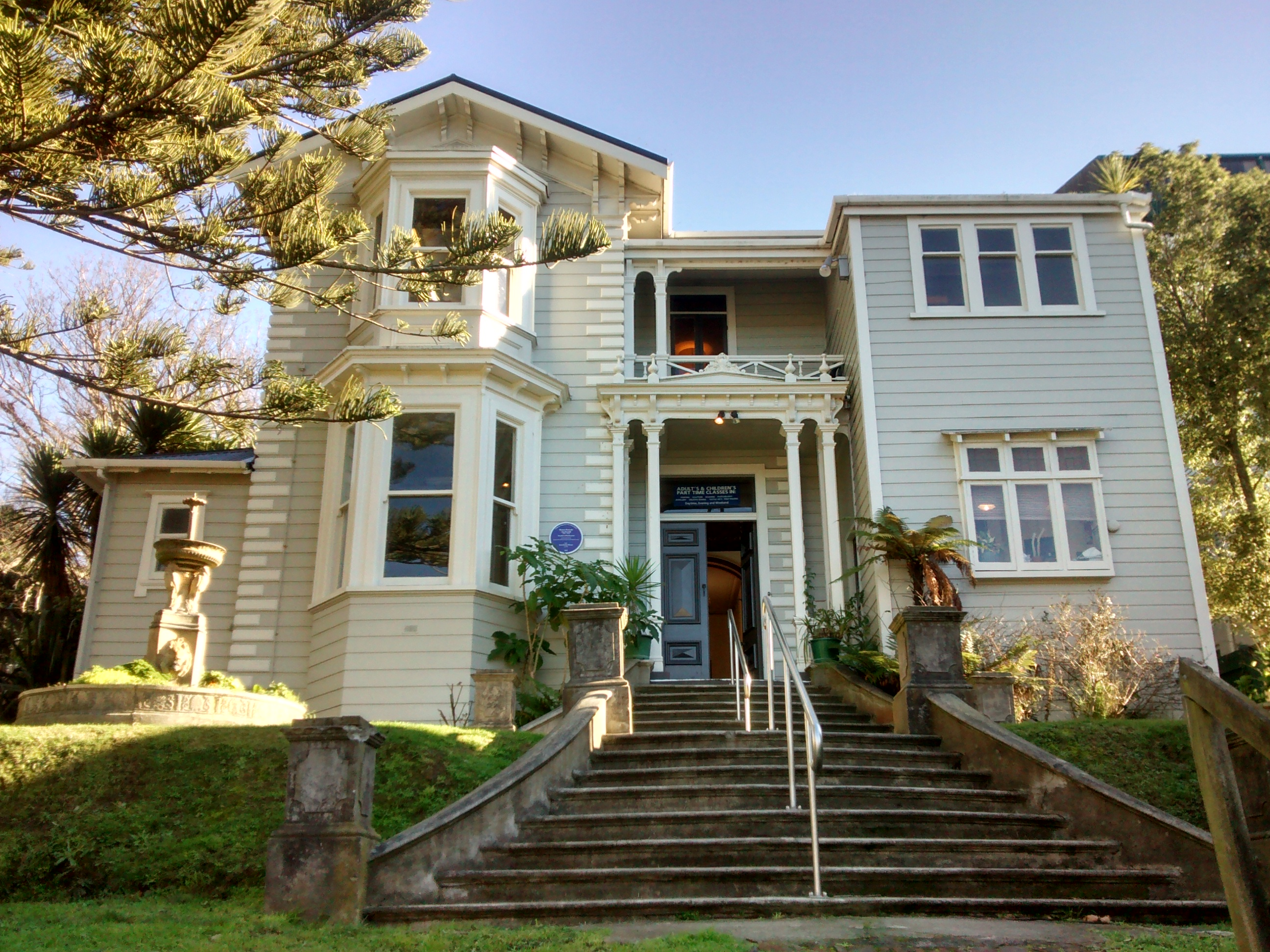
- Inverlochy House in 2014
- Interactive map of the Inverlochy House area

General information
- Location: 3 Inverlochy Place, Te Aro, Wellington
- Coordinates: 41.293705°S 174.770122°E
- Current tenants: Inverlochy Art School
- Completed: 1878
- Owner: New Zealand Academy of Fine Arts

Heritage New Zealand – Category 2
- Designated: 26 May 2006
- Reference no.: 1398

Inverlochy House (also known as Inverlochie House and Inverlochy Flats) is a historic building and art school in Wellington, New Zealand.

The house was originally built for the Wellingtonian councillor Kennedy Macdonald in 1878. When the estate was auctioned in 1893, due to Macdonald's bankruptcy, the building was described as having:

14 rooms, 2 bathrooms, every modern convenience, water laid on, 2 conservatories, a vinery, a fernery, fowl house, wash house and offices, stable with 2 stalls and loose box, being in a salubrious and fashionable location, and an unrivalled family residence

— New Zealand Times, 20 January 1893

In 1980 the Williams Development Holdings Limited gifted Inverlochy House to the New Zealand Academy of Fine Arts for the use of the Williams School of Art at Inverlochy Incorporated. The building is said to be haunted.

The building is classified as a Category 2 historic building by Heritage New Zealand.
