= 1899 Wellington mayoral election =

New Zealand local election

- 29 November 1899
- Turnout: 6,947 (39.40%)
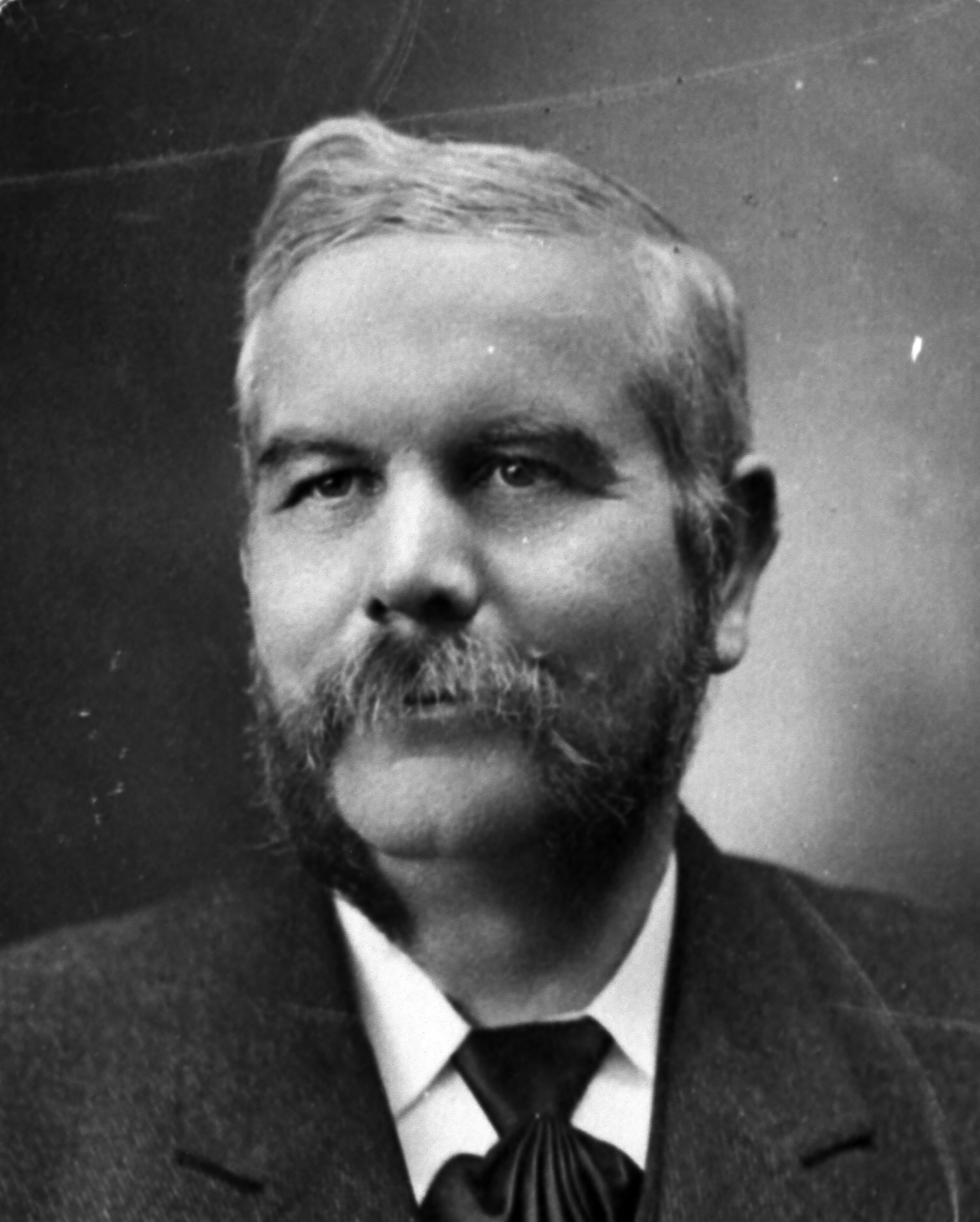

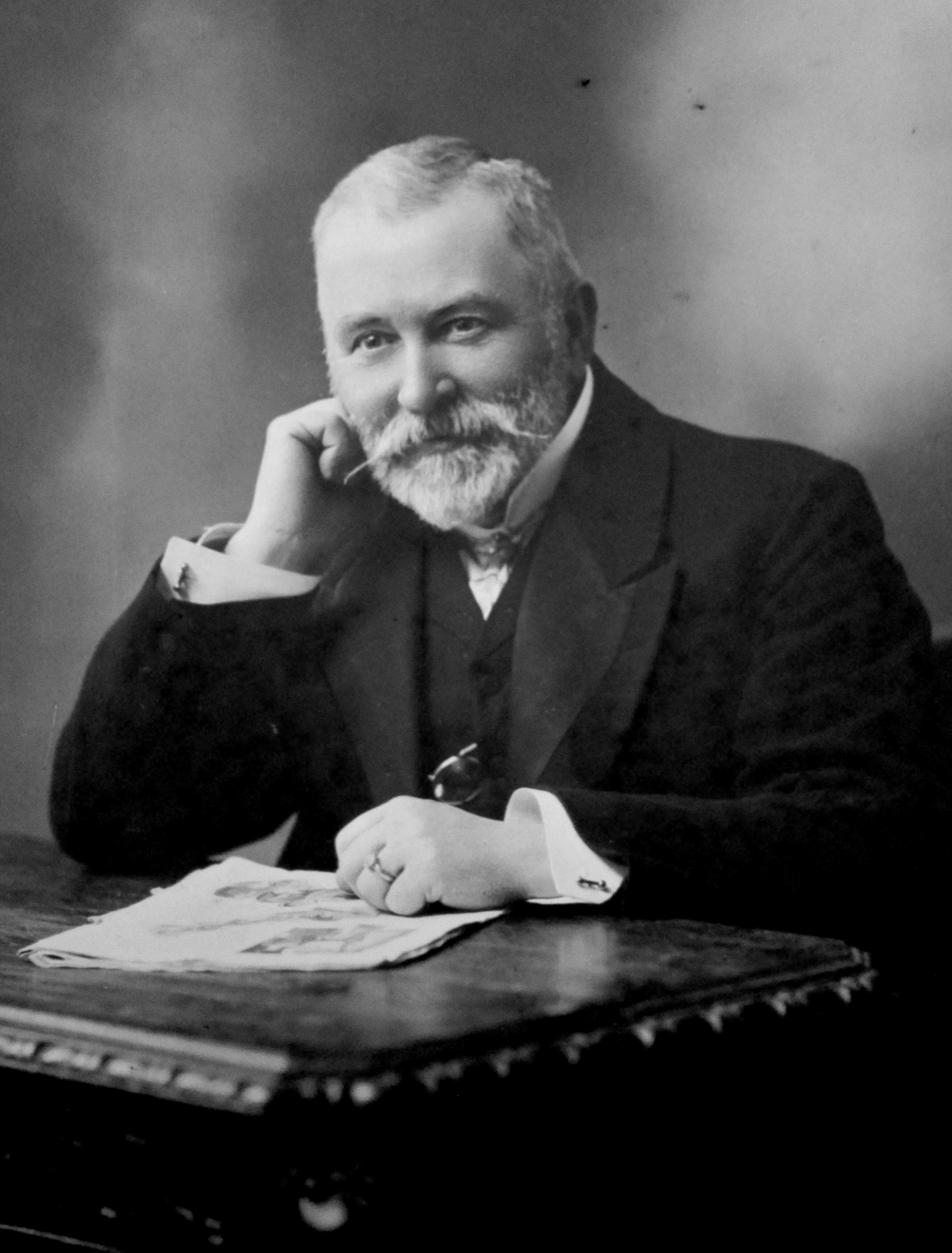
Candidate	John Aitken	Kennedy Macdonald
Party	Independent	Independent
Popular vote	3,566	2,107
Percentage	51.33	30.32
Mayor before election
John Rutherfurd Blair
Elected mayor
John Aitken

The 1899 Wellington mayoral election was part of the New Zealand local elections held that same year. The polling was conducted using the standard first-past-the-post electoral method.

== Background ==
In 1899 incumbent Mayor John Rutherfurd Blair retired leading to local businessman John Aitken being elected to office as Mayor of Wellington, beating challenges from both Kennedy Macdonald (a former councillor) and James Joseph Devine.

== Mayoralty results ==
The following table gives the election results:

1899 Wellington mayoral election
Party	Candidate	Votes	%	±%
Independent	John Aitken	3,566	51.33	
Independent	Kennedy Macdonald	2,107	30.32	
Independent	James Joseph Devine	1,274	18.33	
Majority		1,459	21.00	
Turnout		6,947	39.40	
