= 1892 Wellington mayoral election =

New Zealand local election

- 1 December 1892
- Turnout: 1,982 (65.06%)
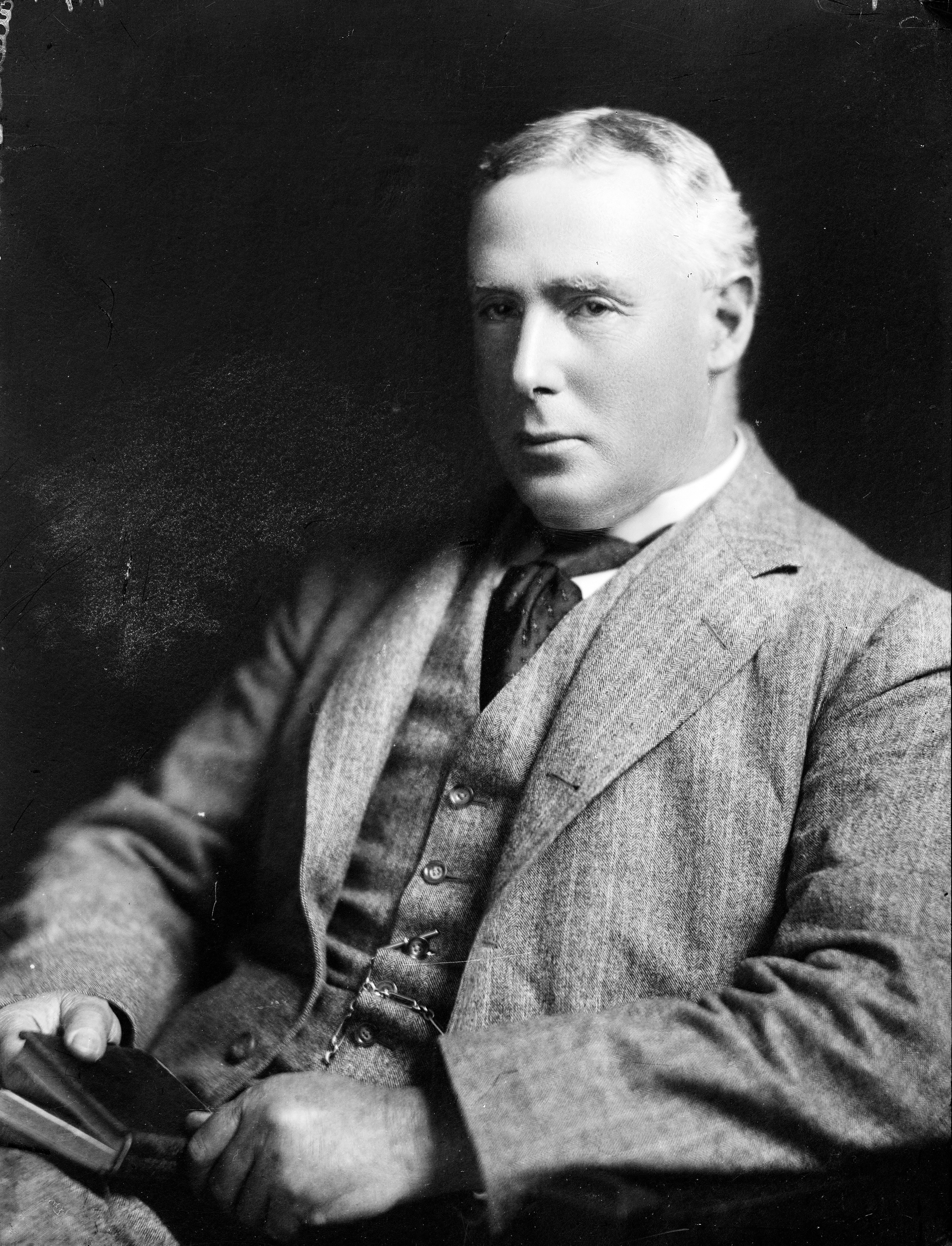

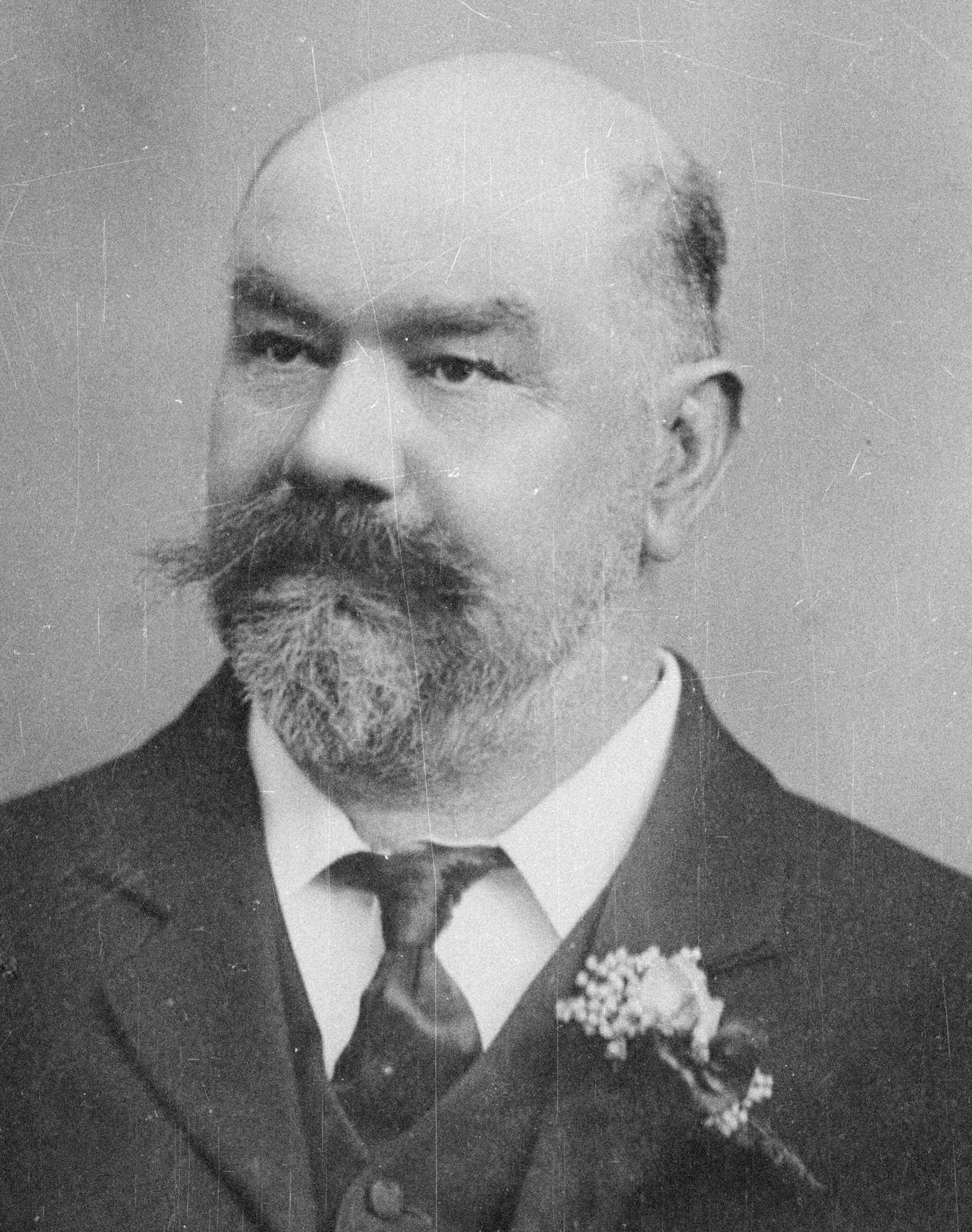
| Candidate | Francis Bell | George Fisher |
| Party | Independent | Independent |
| Popular vote | 1,405 | 572 |
| Percentage | 70.88 | 28.87 |
Mayor before election
Francis Bell
Elected mayor
Francis Bell

The 1892 Wellington mayoral election was part of the New Zealand local elections held that same year to decide who would take the office of Mayor of Wellington for the following year.

== Background ==
The incumbent mayor Francis Bell initially did not intend to stand for a second term. Former mayor John Duthie intended to run in his place, but after commencing his campaign he withdrew owing to illness in his family. After Duthie retired from the contest Bell agreed to run for re-election. The election took place during a period when political partisanship was increasing in local politics. At the beginning of the year Bell had contested a by-election in the City of Wellington electorate for the conservative opposition but was defeated. By contrast Bell's opponent was former mayor George Fisher who was an MP who supported the Liberal Party government.

== Election results ==
The following table gives the election results:

1892 Wellington mayoral election
| Party | Candidate | Votes | % | ±% |
|---|---|---|---|---|
| Independent | Francis Bell | 1,405 | 70.88 | +8.57 |
| Independent | George Fisher | 572 | 28.87 | |
| Informal votes | | 5 | 0.25 | |
| Majority | | 833 | 42.02 | +17.40 |
| Turnout | | 1,982 | 65.06 | |
