= George Allen (New Zealand politician) =

New Zealand politician

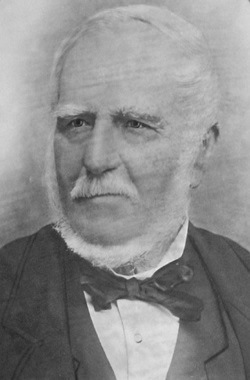

5th Mayor of Wellington
- In office 9 May 1879 – 29 May 1879
- Preceded by: Joe Dransfield
- Succeeded by: William Hutchison

Personal details
- Born: 1814 Deal, Kent, England
- Died: 10 May 1899 (aged 84–85) Wellington, New Zealand
- Occupation: Boat builder

George Allen JP (1814 – 10 May 1899) was a New Zealand politician who served Mayor of Wellington for three weeks in 1879.

== Biography ==
=== Early life and career ===
Allen was originally a Deal boatbuilder. He migrated to Wellington on the Catherine Stuart Forbes in 1841. Apart from living in the Hutt for eight years he spent all his life in Wellington. He was a boat builder by profession and had a business in Thorndon. He was also the Chairman of Directors of the Trust and Loan Company until his death.

He died on 10 May 1899 aged almost 85 at his residence in Wellington after a heart attack. Allen was a member of the Court Sir George Grey AOF. He was married and had five daughters and four sons. His wife died in 1888.

=== Civic service ===
He was a member of the Wellington Provincial Council from 1861 to 1865 for the City of Wellington electorate. From 1876 to 1883, and again from 1887 to 1888, Allen served as a Wellington City Councillor. He was noted as being an attentive and zealous councillor. For a brief period in 1879 he was acting mayor after Joe Dransfield resigned until a by-election could be held which he did not contest. At the scheduled November 1879 election he did stand but was defeated by mayor William Hutchison. At the 1884 election he stood for mayor again, but polled minimal support. He was also a hospital trustee.

Allen Street in Wellington is named after him.

== Notes ==
Political offices
Preceded by Joe Dransfield	Mayor of Wellington; 1879	Succeeded by William Hutchison
