= John Rutherfurd Blair =

New Zealand mayor (1843–1914)

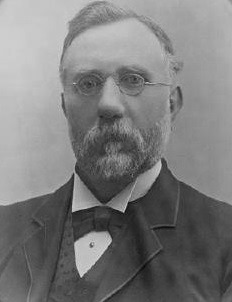
Undated portrait of Blair

John Rutherfurd Blair (8 February 1843 – 25 November 1914) was the Mayor of Wellington, New Zealand from 1897 to 1899.

== Biography ==
Blair was born in Airdrie, Lanarkshire, Scotland, and was a paper merchant. His career started with a large Glasgow paper merchant firm. In 1860 he migrated to Melbourne, Australia, where he was appointed in charge of the printers Sands and McDougall. In Melbourne he met and married Jean Cowan of Dunedin, New Zealand, in 1869. That same year they moved to Wellington where Blair was to be Sands and McDougall's representative, and he remained there for the rest of his life, living first in Vivian Street, and later on The Terrace. In Wellington he entered into partnership with bookseller William Lyon, opening a premises called Lyon and Blair on Lambton Quay in 1874. When William Lyon died, Lyon's son Horatio joined the business. Blair brought Lyon out and continued the business under the name of Lyon & Blair. Lyon & Blair was purchased by Whitcombe and Tombs in 1894. Blair went on to pursue his education interests and directorships of various businesses and institutions.

In 1880 he was appointed to the Education Board, becoming its chairman in 1882. This led to involvement with the Technical Education Board, and his eventually becoming chairman of the Wellington College board of governors until 1899. He was also a member of the school commissioners.

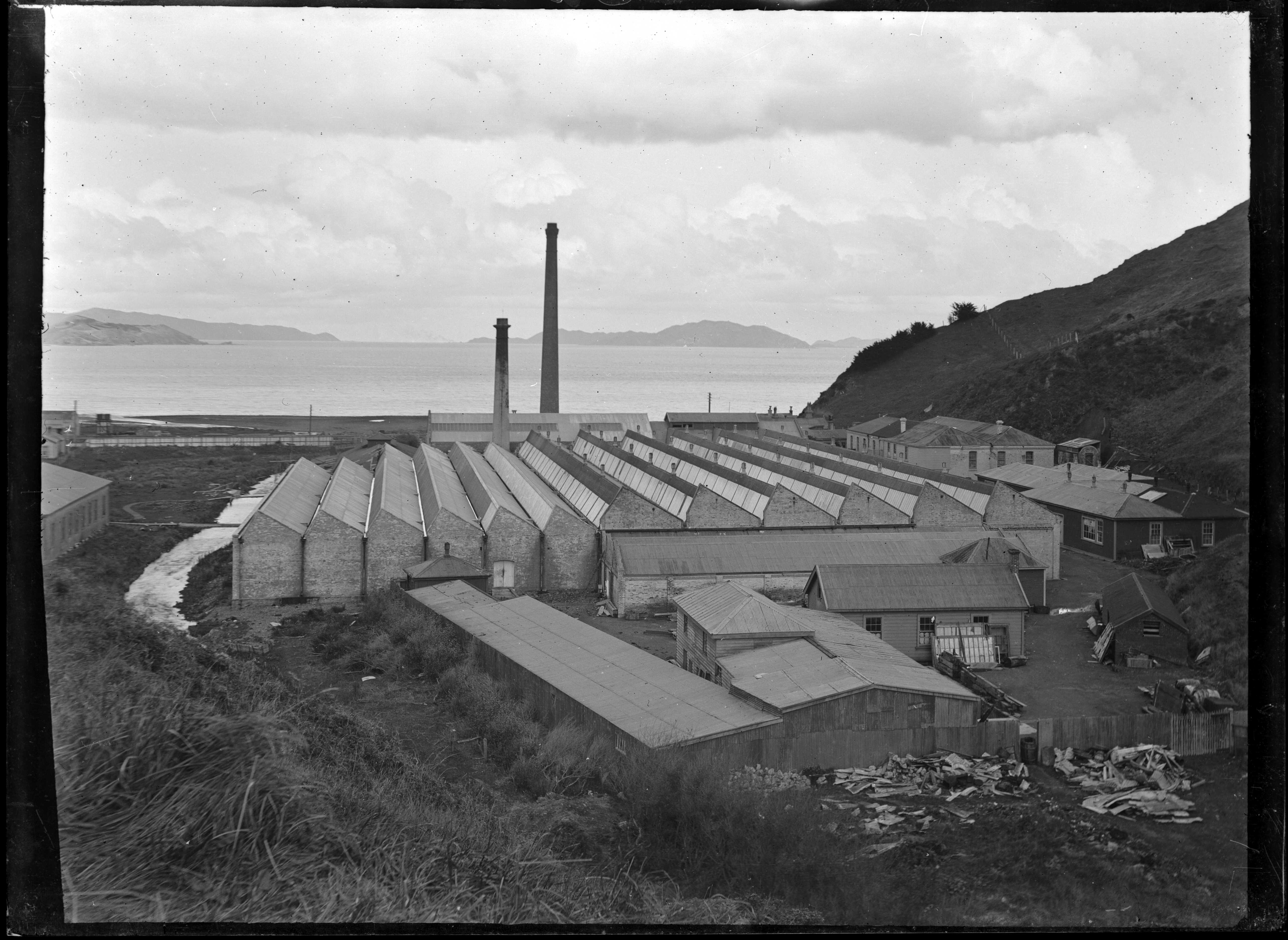
The Wellington Woollen Manufacturing Company factory in Petone circa 1900

From 1899 to 1902 he was the first chairman of the reorganised Bank of New Zealand. At the time of his death he was chairman of the Wellington Investment Trustee and Agency Company, the Paparoa Coal Mining Company, and the Wellington Woollen Manufacturing Company. He was also a director the Gear Meat Company, E W Mills and Company, and the local director of the New Zealand Shipping Company.

From 1898 to 1899 he was elected Mayor of Wellington and a member of the Wellington Harbour Board. He was visiting Justice to Wellington gaols and a member of the Prisons Board.

Blair died at his residence of The Terrace, Wellington aged 71 years old after a fairly long illness. He was survived by his wife and son.

Blair Street in Wellington is named after him.

== Notes ==
Political offices
Preceded by Francis Bell	Mayor of Wellington; 1898–1899	Succeeded by John Aitken
