= Mayor of Wellington =

Elected head of Wellington City Council, New Zealand

- Coat of arms of the city of Wellington

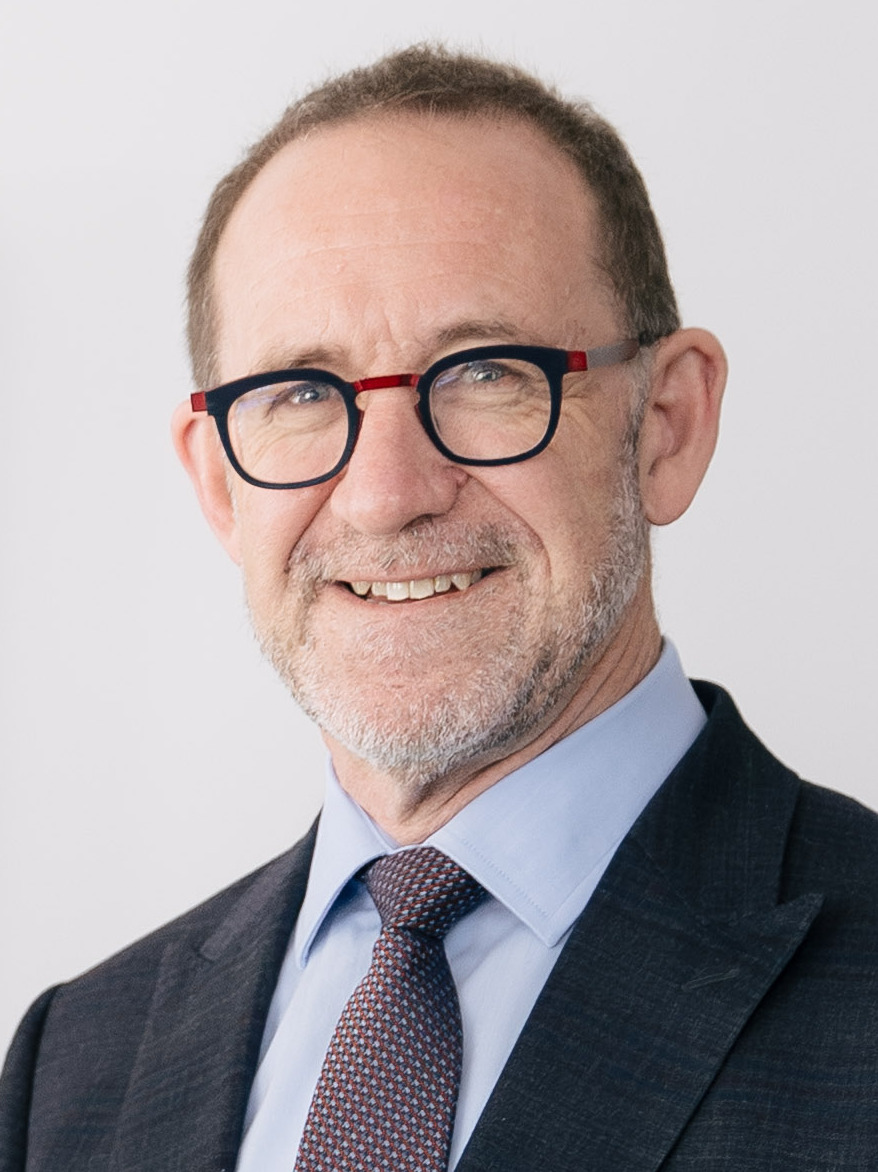
- Incumbent; Andrew Little since 17 October 2025
- Wellington City Council
- Style: His Worship
- Type: Council leader
- Member of: Wellington City Council
- Seat: Wellington Town Hall
- Appointer: Electorate of Wellington City
- Term length: Three years, renewable
- Inaugural holder: George Hunter
- Formation: 3 October 1842
- Deputy: Ben McNulty
- Salary: $197,011
- Website: official website

The mayor of Wellington is the head of the municipal government of the city of Wellington, one of 67 mayors in New Zealand; they preside over the Wellington City Council. The mayor is directly elected using the single transferable vote method of proportional representation.

The current mayor is Andrew Little, elected in October 2025 for a three-year-term.

== History ==
The development of local government in Wellington was erratic. The first attempt to establish governmental institutions, the so-called "Wellington Republic", was short-lived and based on rules written by the New Zealand Company. Colonel William Wakefield was to be the first president.

When the self-proclaimed government arrested a ship's captain for a violation of Wellington law, the Governor William Hobson quickly asserted British sovereignty over the whole of New Zealand, sending a warship and contingent of soldiers to Wellington Harbour and disbanding the council through a show of force.

In January 1842, the Legislative Council in Auckland passed the Municipal Corporations Ordinance, and in May 1842 Wellington was officially proclaimed a borough, the first municipality with this status. The office of mayor was established, but there were only two holders of this office under the Ordinance. George Hunter received the most votes in the election for 12 Burgesses to the new council on 3 October 1842 and was declared mayor. He died suddenly on 19 July 1843. William Guyton was then declared mayor, as runner-up in 1842.

The British Government disallowed the Municipal Corporations Ordinance, but news of this did not reach Wellington until late September 1843, after the election had been held and a second Burgess Roll of qualified voters had been prepared, in 1843 (both Rolls are listed in Carman 1970). After a brief period of little local government, the Province of Wellington was established in 1852, and most of Wellington's affairs were handled by the provincial government.

In 1863, a Town Board was established with three wards (Thorndon, Lambton, Te Aro), but no Mayor.

On 16 September 1870, Wellington was officially incorporated as a city, and a new mayoralty created, which continues to be in place. The establishment of the new council was primarily driven by John Plimmer, called by some the Father of Wellington. Initially, the councillors elected one of their own as mayor towards the end of the year. The role was traditionally awarded to the longest serving councillor. The system changed upon the introduction of The Municipal Corporations Acts Amendment Act, 1875. It legislated that mayors must be elected at large by eligible voters. The inaugural mayoral election was held in 1874 resulting in William Sefton Moorhouse being the first mayor to be elected directly by voters.

Since then the office of mayor has been held by 38 people. Five people have been mayor on two separate occasions, and the longest-serving mayor was Sir Frank Kitts, from 1956 to 1974. Tory Whanau, who held the office from 2022 to 2025, was the first Māori person to serve as mayor.

== List of mayors of Wellington ==
Key

Independent Citizens' Labour

No.	Name	Portrait	Term of office		Elections
-	George Hunter		3 October 1842	19 July 1843†	1842
-	William Guyton		26 July 1843	9 December 1843	—
1	Joe Dransfield		28 September 1870	17 December 1873	—
2	Charles Borlase		8 January 1874	28 January 1875	—
3	William Sefton Moorhouse		28 January 1875	1 December 1875	1874
4	William Hutchison		15 December 1875	19 December 1877	1875 • 1876
(1)	Joe Dransfield		19 December 1877	9 May 1879	1877 • 1878
5	George Allen		10 May 1879	29 May 1879	— (Acting Mayor)
(4)	William Hutchison		29 May 1879	30 November 1881	1879 • 1879 • 1880
6	George Fisher		30 November 1881	17 December 1885	1881 • 1882; 1883 • 1884
7	Arthur Winton Brown		17 December 1885	15 December 1886	1885
8	Sam Brown		15 December 1886	27 December 1888	1886 • 1887
9	John Duthie		27 December 1888	19 December 1889	1888
10	Charles Johnston		19 December 1889	23 December 1890	1889
(7)	Arthur Winton Brown		23 December 1890	16 December 1891	1890
11	Francis Bell		16 December 1891	20 December 1893	1891 • 1892
12	Alfred Brandon		20 December 1893	20 December 1894	1893
13	Charles Luke		20 December 1894	19 December 1895	1894
(6)	George Fisher		19 December 1895	16 December 1896	1895
(11)	Francis Bell		16 December 1896	15 December 1897	1896
14	John Blair		15 December 1897	21 December 1899	1897 • 1898
15	John Aitken		21 December 1899	4 May 1905	1899 • 1901 • 1902; 1903 • 1904
16	Thomas William Hislop		4 May 1905	5 May 1909	1905 • 1906; 1907 • 1908
17	Alfred Newman		5 May 1909	5 May 1910	1909
18	Thomas Wilford		5 May 1910	2 May 1912	1910 • 1911
19	David McLaren		2 May 1912	8 May 1913	1912
20	John Luke		8 May 1913	11 May 1921	1913 • 1914 • 1915; 1917 • 1919
21	Robert Wright		11 May 1921	13 May 1925	1921 • 1923
22	Charles Norwood		13 May 1925	11 May 1927	1925
23	George Troup		11 May 1927	20 May 1931	1927 • 1929
24	Thomas Hislop		20 May 1931	14 June 1944	1931 • 1933 • 1935; 1938 • 1941
25	Will Appleton		14 June 1944	6 December 1950	1944 • 1947
26	Robert Macalister		6 December 1950	6 December 1956	1950 • 1953
27	Frank Kitts		6 December 1956	13 November 1974	1956 • 1959 • 1962; 1965 • 1968 • 1971
28	Michael Fowler		13 November 1974	26 October 1983	1974 • 1977 • 1980
29	Ian Lawrence		26 October 1983	30 October 1986	1983
30	Jim Belich		30 October 1986	28 October 1992	1986 • 1989
31	Fran Wilde		28 October 1992	28 October 1995	1992
32	Mark Blumsky		28 October 1995	27 October 2001	1995 • 1998
33	Kerry Prendergast		27 October 2001	27 October 2010	2001 • 2004 • 2007
34	Celia Wade-Brown		27 October 2010	10 October 2016	2010 • 2013
35	Justin Lester		10 October 2016	19 October 2019	2016
36	Andy Foster		19 October 2019	15 October 2022	2019
37	Tory Whanau		15 October 2022	17 October 2025	2022
38	Andrew Little		17 October 2025	Incumbent	2025

== Deputy mayor of Wellington ==
Deputy Mayor of Wellington
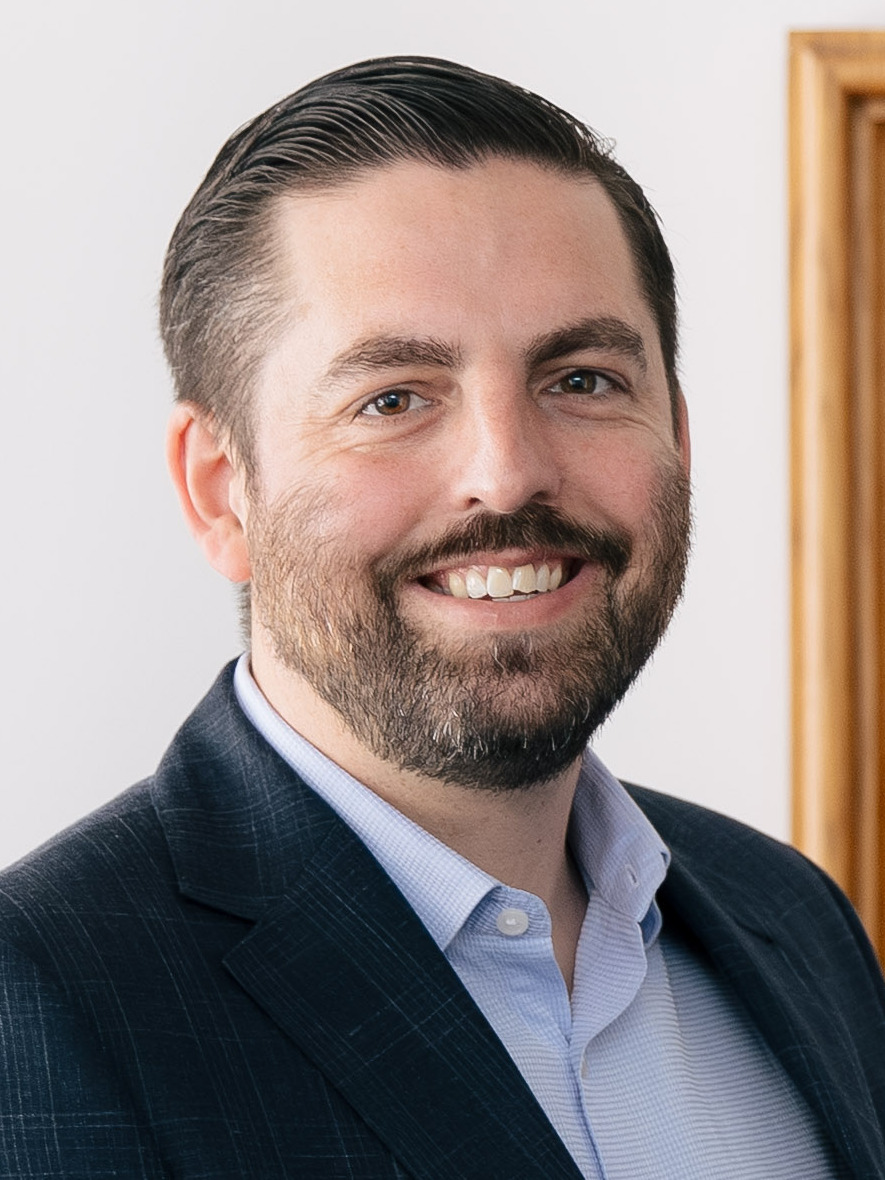
- Incumbent; Ben McNulty since 29 October 2025
- Appointer: Mayor of Wellington Wellington City Council (Note: The mayor has the power to appoint a deputy mayor, though councillors can vote to replace them without the mayor's consent.)
- Inaugural holder: John Smith
- Salary: $136,327

The deputy mayor of Wellington is the deputy head of the municipal government of Wellington, New Zealand. They fill in for the mayor when they are absent, among other responsibilities.

=== List of deputy mayors ===
Key

Independent Citizens' Labour Greens

No.	Name	Term of office		Mayor
No.	Name	Start	End (Note: According to the Local Electoral Act 2001, a deputy mayor's term ends either when they are dismissed, they fail to be re-elected, or when their successor enters office.)	
1	John Smith	1910	1912	Wilford
Vacant
2	George Frost	1920	1921	Luke
Vacant
3	Martin Luckie	1923	1931	Troup
4	William Bennett	1931	1936†	Hislop
(3)	Martin Luckie	1936	1947	Hislop
(3)	Martin Luckie	1936	1947	Appleton
5	Robert Macalister	1947	1950	Appleton
6	William Stevens	1950	1953	Macalister
7	Ernest Toop	1953	1956	Macalister
8	Harry Nankervis	1956	1960	Kitts
9	Bill Arcus	1960	1962	Kitts
10	Denis McGrath	1962	1965	Kitts
11	Matt Benney	1965	1966	Kitts
12	Bob Archibald	1966	1970	Kitts
13	George Porter	1970	1971	Kitts
14	John Jeffries	1971	1974	Kitts
15	Ian Lawrence	1974	1983	Fowler
16	Gavin Wilson	1983	1986	Lawrence
17	Helene Ritchie	1986	1988	Belich
18	Terry McDavitt	1988	1989	Belich
19	David Watt	1989	1995	Belich
19	David Watt	1989	1995	Wilde
20	Kerry Prendergast	1995	2001	Blumsky
21	Alick Shaw	2001	2007	Prendergast
22	Ian McKinnon	2007	2013	Prendergast
22	Ian McKinnon	2007	2013	Wade-Brown
23	Justin Lester	2013	2016	Wade-Brown
24	Paul Eagle	2016	2017	Lester
25	Jill Day	2017	24 October 2019	Lester
26	Sarah Free	24 October 2019	21 October 2022	Foster
27	Laurie Foon	21 October 2022	29 October 2025	Whanau
28	Ben McNulty	29 October 2025	Incumbent	Little

== Sources ==
- Yska, Redmer (2006). Wellington: Biography of a City. Auckland: Reed Books. ISBN 9780790011172.
- Betts, G. M. (1970). Betts on Wellington: A City and its Politics. Wellington: Reed. ISBN 0-589-00469-7.
- The Birth of a City: Wellington 1840–1843 by A. H. Carman (1970, Wright & Carman, Wellington)
- No Mean City by Stuart Perry (1969 booklet, Wellington City Council) includes a paragraph and a portrait or photo of each mayor, including Hunter & Guyton.
