= Sam Brown (mayor) =

Mayor of Wellington from 1887 to 1888

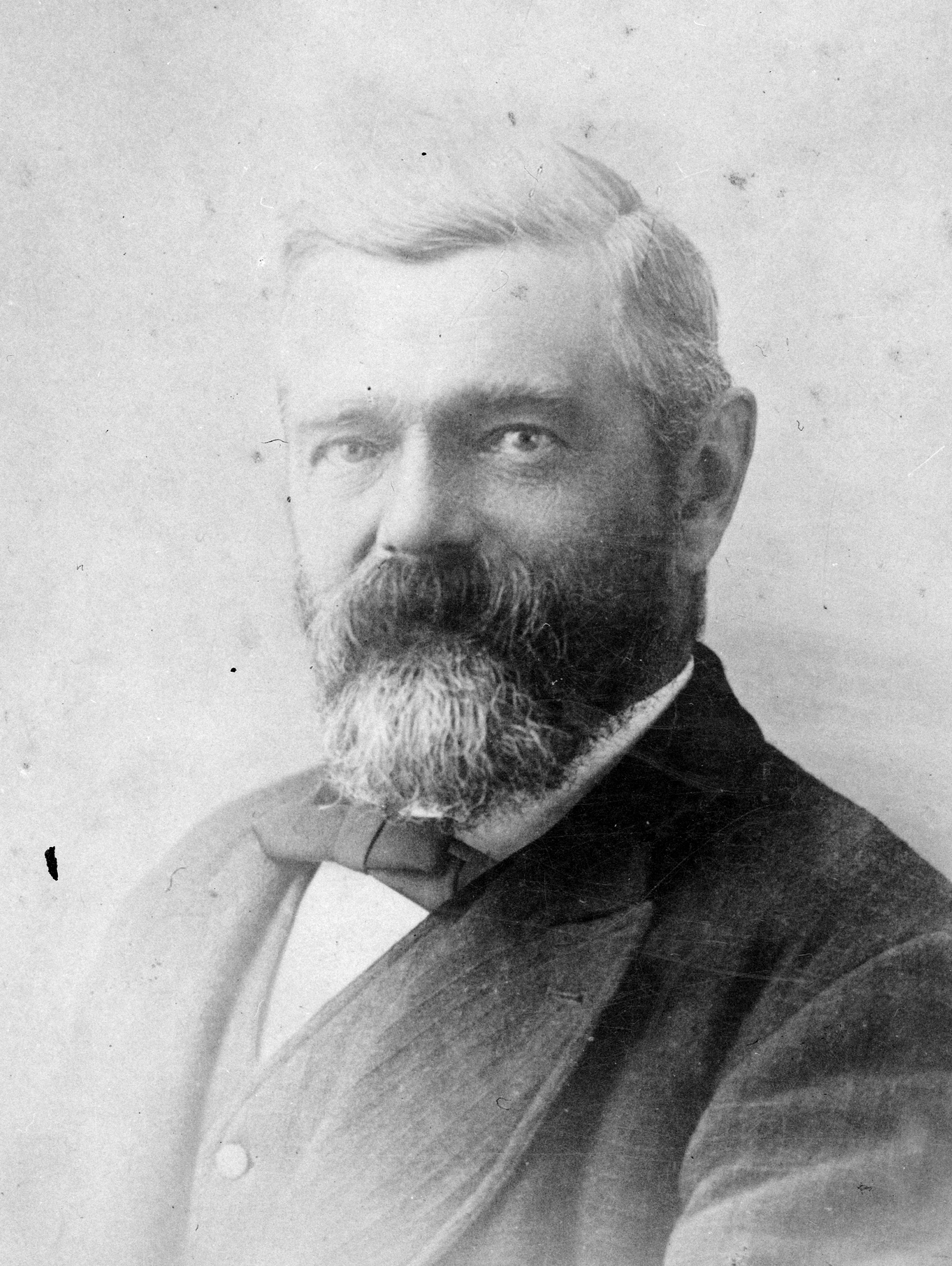
Brown in c. 1890

Samuel Brown (1845 – 14 August 1909) was a New Zealand politician who served as the Mayor of Wellington from 1887 to 1888.

Brown was born in Ireland in 1845. He came to New Zealand in 1862, first settling in Invercargill having walked there from Dunedin. He erected Hallenstein and Co's first business in New Zealand. Brown then moved to Wellington in 1864 where he was a merchant and contractor, responsible for the Wellington steam tramways. He also obtained the No 13 or Paekakariki Contract for the tunnels and central section of the Wellington and Manawatu Line for the Wellington and Manawatu Railway Company. With access difficulties this was the most difficult contract for the line; see North–South Junction. He was also involved in the construction of the Midland and Westland Railways. He built the first portion of the Wellington Gas Works, the Maginnity Street drill shed, and the first lighthouse at Cape Farewell. He was the Managing Director of S Brown and Sons Limited, wood and coal merchants. This was a firm he founded on his arrival in Wellington. He was a member of the Wellington Bowling Club and a Freemason. At one point in time he had a wood and flax business based in Foxton and owned a small steamer the Piaka as part of that business.

He was a Wellington City Councillor from 1879 to 1885, and Mayor from 1887 to 1888. Brown served on the Wellington Harbour Board and the Wellington College Board of Governors. He was the first President of the Wellington Industrial Association, which promoted the Wellington Industrial Exhibition of 1896. He was also first President of the New Zealand Industrial Association. Brown was also the employers representative on the Arbitration Court for a time. The Wellington Technical School received financial support from the Industrial Association as a result of his efforts and support.

Brown had four sons and his only daughter was married to the City Solicitor, John O'Shea. Brown died at his Hanson Street, Wellington residence on 14 August 1909 after a brief period of illness. He was buried at the Bolton Street Cemetery in Wellington.

Political offices
Preceded by Arthur Winton Brown	Mayor of Wellington; 1887–1888	Succeeded by John Duthie
