= Arthur Winton Brown =

New Zealand mayor (1856–1917)

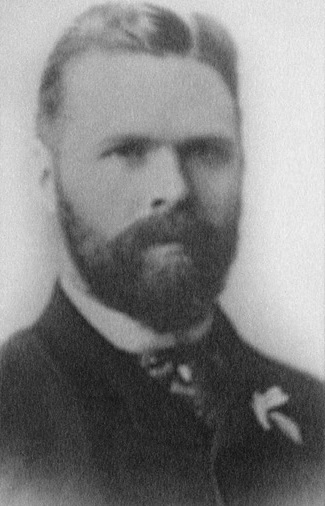

7th Mayor of Wellington
- In office 23 December 1890 – 16 December 1891
- Preceded by: Charles Johnston
- Succeeded by: Francis Bell
- In office 17 December 1885 – 15 December 1886
- Preceded by: George Fisher
- Succeeded by: Samuel Brown

Personal details
- Born: 27 December 1856 Port Chalmers, New Zealand
- Died: 27 July 1916 (aged 59) New Orleans, Louisiana, United States
- Spouse: Mary Eliza Linnell (m. 1877)
- Relations: Byron Brown (brother)
- Children: 3
- Occupation: Grocer

Arthur Winton Brown JP (27 December 1856 – 27 July 1916) was a New Zealand businessman and politician who served as the mayor of Wellington from 1885 to 1886 and 1890 to 1891.

== Family ==
Brown was born at Port Chalmers, Dunedin on 27 December 1856. He was the son of carpenter Arthur Brown, who later became cabinet maker and shipwright, and his wife Jane Winton. The family moved to Wellington in either the late 1850s or early 1860s. Brown married Mary Eliza Linnell on 6 September 1877. They had three sons: Arthur Percy Linnell (1878–1879), Arthur Bernard Linnell (1879 – 19 December 1913), and Harold Vivian (1881-1881). Brown's brother was Byron Paul Brown.

After Brown's disappearance in 1892 his wife and son, Arthur Bernard, remained in Wellington for a time before supposedly leaving for England to stay with relatives. In the 1900 United States census Arthur Bernard Brown was living in New Orleans and was described as a medical student. Both he, and his father and mother were listed a boarders at the address.

Arthur Bernard Brown graduated from Tulane University School of Medicine in 1901. He married Wilhelmina Emily Otto, a Polish migrant, on 8 April 1902. In 1910 he was appointed to the State Board of Medical Examiners and in 1911 he became Secretary of the Louisiana State Board of Health. In 1913 President of the Federation of State Medical Boards. He died on 19 December 1913 after suffering a prolonged illness. In 1918 his wife, Wilhelmina, was the Assistant Secretary of the Louisiana Nurses Board of Examiners and the American Red Cross work of the Gulf Division. In the 1950s she was Secretary of the Golden Age Guild at Charity Hospital. She died on 2 March 1964 in New Orleans. Her estate set up the Arthur Bernard Brown Memorial Fund at Tulane University in 1965.

== Business ==
Brown was employed in T J Mountain's grocery business until he started his own at the age of 20. He acquired the grocery business of a Mr Hollis located in Tory Street, Wellington. He was a successful grocer and opened another shop on Lambton Quay near Bowen Street. He retired from direct involvement in the grocery business prior to 1890 and was, until his disappearance from Wellington in 1892, a land agent and auctioneer.

== Community service ==
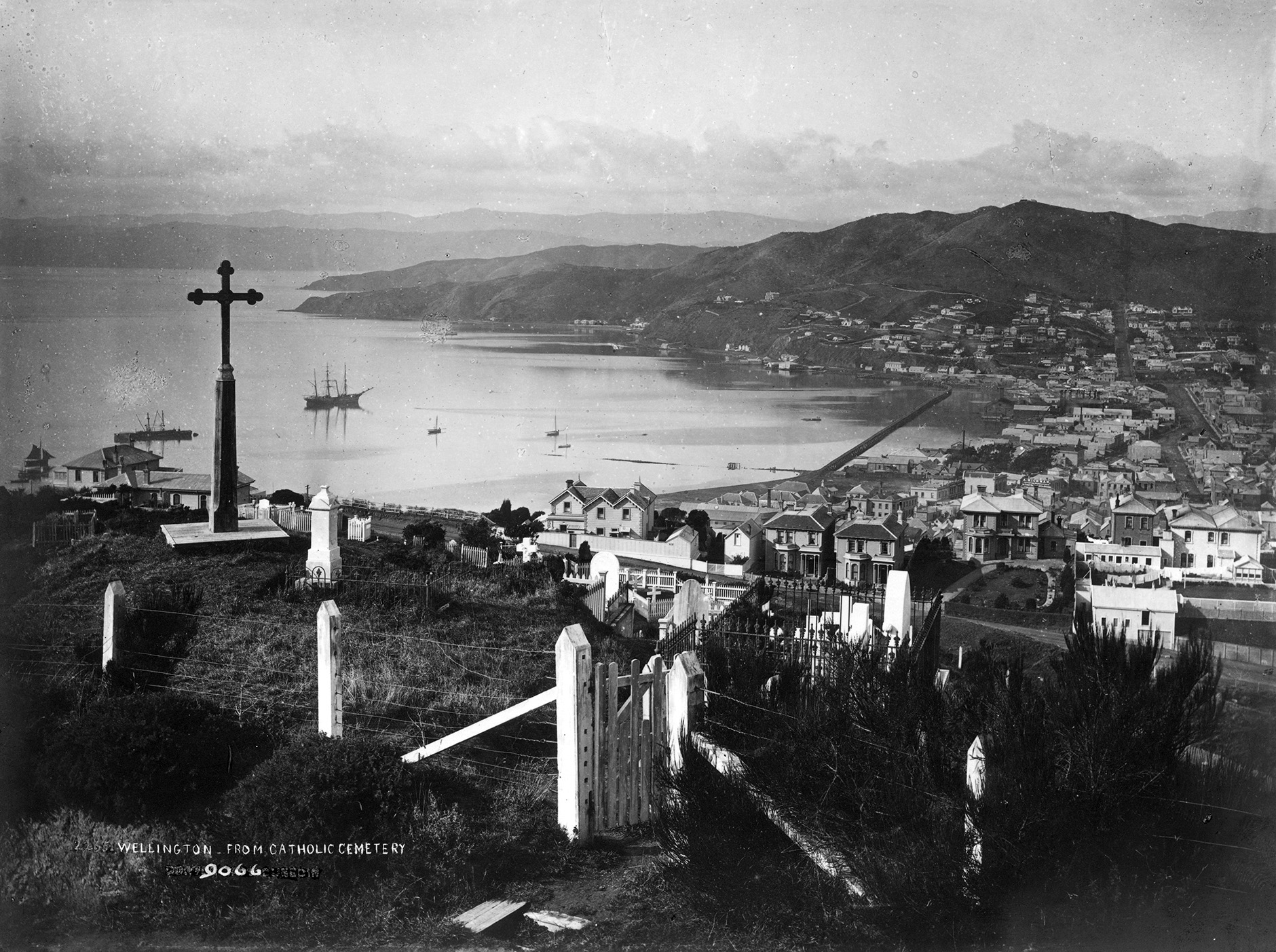
Wellington in 1885

Brown's first public office was on the Mount Cook School Committee, when aged 25. He successfully stood for the Cook Ward in the Wellington City Council elections and was a City Councillor from 1881 to 1885. He contested and won the Mayoralty in 1886. He did not stand in 1887, but in 1888 he stood for Council in the Te Aro Ward, which he served from 1888 to 1890. In 1891 he was again elected Mayor.

Brown was involved in a number of community organisations. He was also Grand Master of a leading Friendly society. A position he was particularly proud of.

In December 1891 Brown laid the foundation stone to the Wellington Free Public Library on the corner of Victoria and Mercer Streets. This was to be his last public act as Mayor before his disappearance.

== Disappearance ==
=== Prelude ===
On 1 January 1892 Brown was one of the judges at the Caledonian Society's sports event. On 12 January, in his capacity as Grand Master he addressed new members of the Zealandia Lodge, IOOF. He was elected as President of the Library and Literary Institute for Island Bay on 19 January. On 26 January he was noted as being a Trustee of the Friendly Societies Guarantee Association, being at its meeting the day before. The next day Brown attended the Wellington Education Board meeting in his capacity as a board member.

He then announced that he intended to go to Mokau, in Taranaki, to visit a coal mine of which he was a director. His stated plan was to go to Auckland, stay for a few days with Albert Devore, the then mayor of Auckland City, and then go on to Mokau.

=== Flight ===
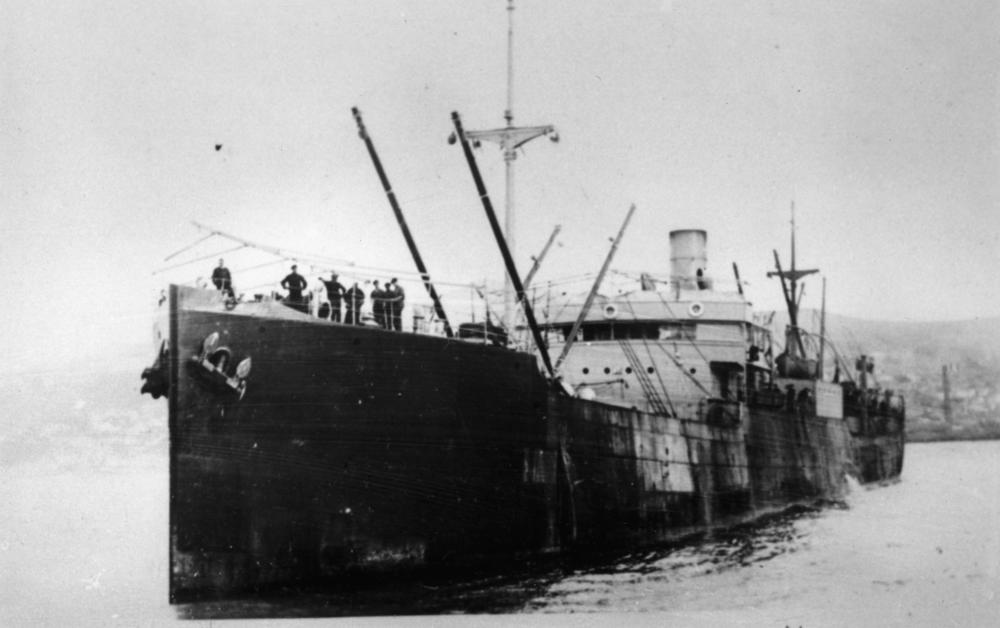
SS Waihora

After a few weeks without hearing from him his friends became alarmed. On making inquiries they found that Brown did not go to Mokau but after sailing to Auckland on 29 January by the steamer Waihora he remained on board, bound for Sydney, Australia. Brown's name did not appear on the ships list for Australia as he booked the trip after the ship had left Wellington. The Waihora arrived in Sydney on 7 February.

The last known place he stayed was a Sydney hotel, Pfarhlert's, on the corner of Carrington and Margaret Streets. The hotel's proprietor, J Lichtscheindl, was originally from Wellington and proprietor of the Empire Hotel. From there Brown wrote several letters to acquaintances in Wellington stating that the reason he had left was because of debt. But early investigations into his finances revealed that he appeared to be financially sound. He was listed as an absconding debtor in Australia's 1892 New South Wales Police Gazette and the Victoria Police Gazette, but by that time he had already left Australia. The New Zealand Police Gazette stated that Brown had left Sydney for Melbourne with the intention of heading to America, but stated that he was thought to have gone to Japan. A warrant for his arrest had been issued by the New Zealand Police.

=== Mokau Coal Company ===
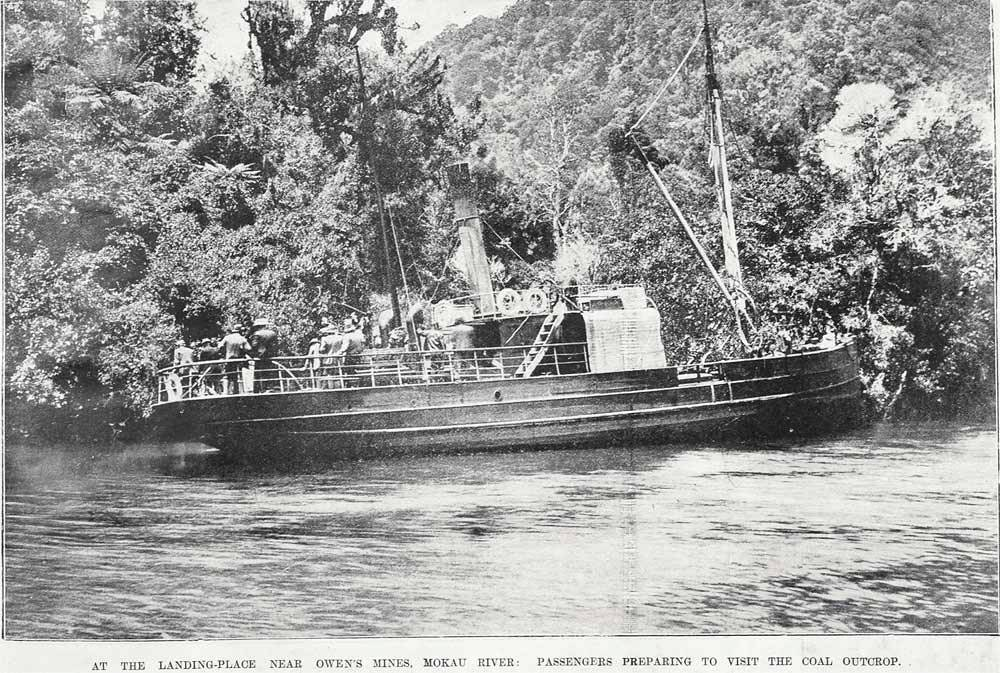
Steamer on the Mokau River near the coal mines

No motive for his departure came to light initially. He was considered to be financially well off and his estate, when assessed in February or March 1892, was more than adequate to meet its liabilities. Unknown at that time was Brown's exposure to the Mokau Coal Company debts. Character wise, Brown was described as "a self-made man, and very proud of his maker". Local papers of the time stated that had he remained in Wellington any of the difficulties he was facing could easily have been resolved. He was well liked and had considerable local support.

Brown was the Chairman of the Mokau Coal Company. The company collapsed just after his departure, with unpaid wages and debts. It is probable that he knew of the impending collapse and considered himself to be financially exposed to the company's debts. By June 1892 his estate was being wound up by the Official Assignee. The amount estimated to be payable to creditors had dropped from almost equal to 3 shillings 6 pence to the pound (20 shillings). A further £300 claim related the Mokau Coal Company against Brown had been received, which meant even less would be able to be paid to debtors.

=== Letters from overseas ===
The Evening Post reported in December 1892 that Brown had opened a grocery shop in Whitechapel Road, London.

In 1894 a newspaper report stated that one of Brown's relatives had received a letter from him posted in Japan. Later in 1896 a Feilding resident reported that they had received a letter written on 15 March from a Mr Tresseder, a fellow New Zealander and a newspaper reporter, advising that Brown was now living in New Orleans and doing very well.

In 1911 a letter was received in New Zealand from St Louis, USA stating that Brown was living there, and was a candidate for a high office. Nothing further was heard about him in New Zealand. This letter was more likely about his son, Arthur Bernard Brown, who was appointed Secretary of the Louisiana State Board of Health in 1911.

== America ==
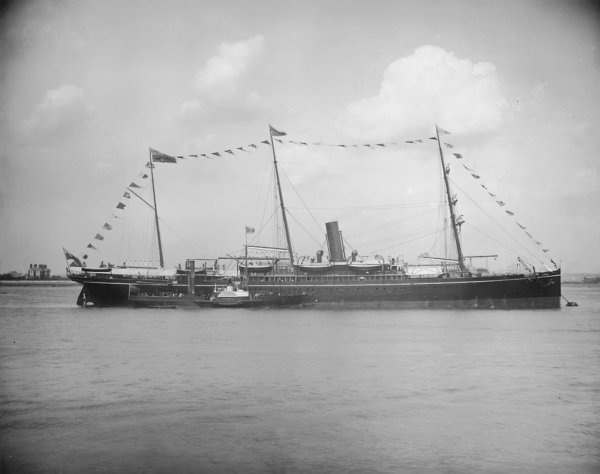
RMS Oriental

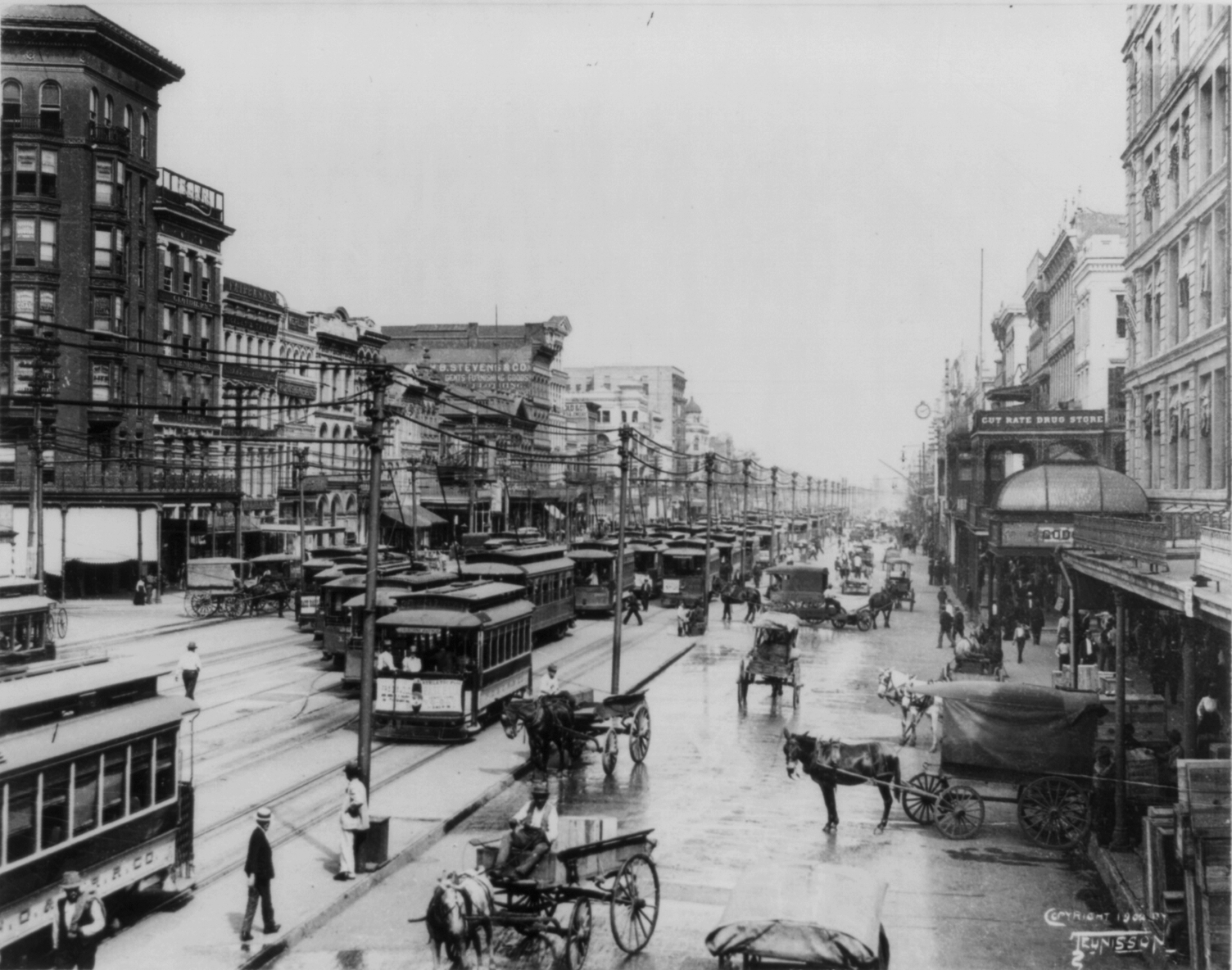
Canal Street, New Orleans in 1901

According to his application for naturalisation as a United States citizen, Brown arrived in New York on the City of Chicago on 10 March 1892. The ship had sailed from England and therefore for this to be true Brown must have sailed from Australia to England at the earliest opportunity in February. It is possible that he used an assumed name on these voyages. The date of his arrival in New York, if he was on the City of Chicago, would have either been 25 March at the earliest or possibly 22 April 1892. The ship sailed on the Liverpool to New York route, taking 8 or 9 days to cross the Atlantic. The earliest ship he could have caught from Sydney was a P&O ship RMS Oriental that sailed on 8 February via Suez and arrived in London on 20 March, which was about 3 days after the City of Chicago's March departure. This would make 22 April the more likely date with a number of alternative ships he could have sailed from Australia on. Australian newspapers of 22 February based on New Zealand reports about letters that had been received there said he was staying in Sydney. The City of Chicago ran aground and sank at Greenland on 22 June 1892.

After arriving in New York City Brown then went to Denver, Colorado, where he applied for citizenship on 20 June. His profession was listed as a journalist. On his application his wife was stated to be living in New Orleans. He had selected that he 'was' married, implying that he was separated from her. His death notice in 1916 said he had been resident in New Orleans since 1893. In July 1896, an A W Brown was reported as staying at a New Orleans hotel.

Brown and his family appeared in the 1900 United States Census living together in New Orleans. His son was listed as a medical student, but neither Brown or his wife had occupations showing and were listed as Boarders at the address. By the 1920 census only his wife was shown as living in New Orleans.

In 1900 Brown worked for The Times Democrat as a reporter and the Daily States as an advertising representative. By 1908 Brown was a part owner of The Shreveport Times until at least 1915 and acted as its secretary-treasurer. He had transferred from the Daily States where he was its business manager, possibly with Robert Ewings acquisition of the paper in 1908.

In 1914-1915 Brown was listed as Senior Warden of Winnsbro No 246 Masonic Lodge, Franklin Parish and an eligible member of the Louisiana Grand Lodge. Brown's son Arthur Bernard had been a member of Louisiana Lodge 102. By 1916 Brown was Worshipful Master of the Winnsbro Lodge.

Brown died on 27 July 1916 at his home. His obituary stated he had been ill for some 5 years and had suffered a paralytic stroke some two years before he died. He was employed by a newspaper. Both he and his son are buried at the Masonic Cemetery No 1, New Orleans.

Political offices
Preceded by George Fisher	Mayor of Wellington; 1885-1886 1890-1891	Succeeded by Samuel Brown
Preceded by Charles Johnston	Mayor of Wellington; 1885-1886 1890-1891	Succeeded by Francis Bell
