= Results of the 2001 New Zealand territorial authority elections =

2001 New Zealand territorial authority elections
- 13 October 2001
- All 74 local councils
Party	Councils	+/–
No majority	70	
Christchurch 2021	1	0
TW	1	
This lists parties that won seats. See the complete results below.
- 74 mayors and 874 local councillors
Party	Seats	+/–
Mayors
Independent	70	
Christchurch 2021	1	0
TW	1	
CVTT	1	
PR&RT	1	
Local councillors
Independent	691	
Labour	14	
Christchurch 2021	13	+2
Citizens & Ratepayers	10	
TW	9	
Independent Citizens	7	
CVTT	5	
City Vision	3	
Hamilton First	3	
Howick Community Spirit	3	
Papakura Vision	3	
Papatoetoe Independents	3	
The Proven Team	3	
Three 4 North	3	
PR&RT	1	
Alliance	1	
Green	1	
Other groups	23	
vacant	1	
missing info	77	
This lists parties that won seats. See the complete results below.

Elections for the territorial authorities of New Zealand were held from September until 13 October 2001 as part of that year's nation-wide local elections. 874 local councillors and 74 mayors were elected across 74 councils.

== Summary ==
=== Councillors and council control ===
Party	Mayors				Councillors				Council control	+/−
Party	1998	Elected	+/−	Candidates	1998	Elected	+/−	Candidates	Council control	+/−
No majority										
Independent		70				691				
Labour (Note: Not including Christchurch or Lower Hutt candidates; they are included in relevant local group numbers.)		0				14			0	
Christchurch 2021 (Note: Including Labour and Alliance candidates as they ran as part of this ticket.) (Christchurch)	1	1	0	1		13			1	
Citizens and Ratepayers (Auckland)		0				10			0	
Team West (Waitakere)		1		1		9			1	
Independent Citizens (Christchurch)		0				7			0	0
Terris' Team (Lower Hutt)		1		1		5			0	
Manurewa Residents (Manukau)		0				4			0	
City Vision (Auckland)		0				3			0	
Hamilton First (Hamilton)		0				3			0	
Howick Community Spirit (Manukau)		0				3			0	
Papakura Vision (Manukau)		0				3			0	
Papatoetoe Independents (Manukau)		0				3			0	
The Proven Team (Far North)		0				3			0	
Three 4 North (Wellington)		0				3			0	
Hutt 2020 (Note: Includes Labour candidates) (Lower Hutt)		0				2			0	
Independent Ratepayers and Residents (Waitakere)		0				2			0	
Resource Users Association (Western BOP)		0				2			0	
Taupo Concerned Citizens (Taupo)		0				2			0	
Pakuranga Ratepayers and Residents Team (Manukau)		1		1		1			0	
Alliance (Note: Not including joint Christchurch 2021 candidates.)		0				1			0	
Community First (Far North)		0				1			0	
Democracy Network in Action (Western BOP)		0				1			0	
Green		0				1			0	
Independent Ratepayers (Manukau)		0				1			0	
Pakuranga 2000 (Manukau)		0				1			0	
Rates Reform (Gisborne)		0				1			0	
Residents and Ratepayers (Kaipara)		0				1			0	
Team Auckland (Auckland)		0				1			0	
vacant		0				1				
missing info		0				77				

=== Affiliation of councillors by council ===
Council	Electoral system	Seats	Councillors				Details	Refs
Council	Electoral system	Seats	1998		Elected		Details	Refs
Far North	FPP	10	missing info		Independent	6	Details	
Far North	FPP	10	missing info		The Proven Team	3	Details	
Far North	FPP	10	missing info		Community First	1	Details	
Whangarei	FPP	13	missing info		Independent	13	Details	
Kaipara	FPP	10	missing info		Independent	9	Details	
Kaipara	FPP	10	missing info		Residents and Ratepayers	1	Details	
Rodney	FPP	12	missing info		Independent	12	Details	
Auckland	FPP	19	missing info		Citizens and Ratepayers	10	Details	
Auckland	FPP	19	missing info		Independent	3	Details	
Auckland	FPP	19	missing info		City Vision	3	Details	
Auckland	FPP	19	missing info		Labour	2	Details	
Auckland	FPP	19	missing info		Team Auckland	1	Details	
North Shore	FPP	15	missing info		Independent	15	Details	
Waitakere	FPP	14	missing info		Team West	9	Details	
Waitakere	FPP	14	missing info		Independent	3	Details	
Waitakere	FPP	14	missing info		Independent Ratepayers and Residents	2	Details	
Manukau	FPP	20	missing info		Labour	4	Details	
Manukau	FPP	20	missing info		Manurewa Residents	4	Details	
Manukau	FPP	20	missing info		Howick Community Spirit	3	Details	
Manukau	FPP	20	missing info		Papatoetoe Independents	3	Details	
Manukau	FPP	20	missing info		Independent	3	Details	
Manukau	FPP	20	missing info		Independent Ratepayers	1	Details	
Manukau	FPP	20	missing info		Pakuranga Ratepayers and Residents Team	1	Details	
Manukau	FPP	20	missing info		Pakuranga 2000	1	Details	
Papakura	FPP	8	missing info		Independent	4	Details	
Papakura	FPP	8	missing info		Papakura Vision	3	Details	
Papakura	FPP	8	missing info		Your Team	1	Details	
Franklin	FPP	14	missing info		Independent	14	Details	
Thames-Coromandel	FPP	9	missing info		Independent	9	Details	
Hauraki	FPP	13	missing info		Independent	13	Details	
Waikato	FPP	13	missing info		Independent	13	Details	
Matamata-Piako	FPP	11	missing info		Independent	11	Details	
Hamilton	FPP	13	missing info		Independent	7	Details	
Hamilton	FPP	13	missing info		Hamilton First	3	Details	
Hamilton	FPP	13	missing info		Proudly Independent	3	Details	
Waipa	FPP	12	missing info		Independent	12	Details	
Otorohanga	FPP	7	missing info		Independent	6	Details	
Otorohanga	FPP	7	missing info		vacant (Note: No candidates nominated for the Wharepuhunga ward; see 2002 Otorohanga District Council by-election)		Details	
South Waikato	FPP	13	missing info		Independent	13	Details	
Waitomo	FPP	6	missing info		Independent	6	Details	
Taupo	FPP	12	missing info		Independent	10	Details	
Taupo	FPP	12	missing info		Taupo Concerned Citizens	2	Details	
Western Bay of Plenty	FPP	12	missing info		Independent	9	Details	
Western Bay of Plenty	FPP	12	missing info		Resource Users Association	2	Details	
Western Bay of Plenty	FPP	12	missing info		Democracy Network in Action	1	Details	
Tauranga	FPP	13	missing info		Independent	13	Details	
Rotorua	FPP	12	missing info		Independent	12	Details	
Whakatane	FPP	13	missing info		Independent	13	Details	
Kawerau	FPP	8	missing info		Independent	8	Details	
Opotiki	FPP	10	missing info		Independent	10	Details	
Gisborne	FPP	14	missing info		Independent	13	Details	
Gisborne	FPP	14	missing info		Rates Reform	1	Details	
Wairoa	FPP	9	missing info		Independent	9	Details	
Hastings	FPP	15	missing info		Independent	15	Details	
Napier	FPP	12	missing info		Independent	12	Details	
Central Hawke's Bay	FPP	10	missing info		Independent	10	Details	
New Plymouth	FPP	16	missing info		Independent	16	Details	
Stratford	FPP	10	missing info		Independent	10	Details	
South Taranaki	FPP	12	missing info		Independent	12	Details	
Ruapehu	FPP	11	missing info		Independent	11	Details	
Wanganui	FPP	12	missing info		missing info		Details	
Rangitikei	FPP	11	missing info		Independent	11	Details	
Manawatu	FPP	10	missing info		Independent	10	Details	
Palmerston North	FPP	15	missing info		Independent	15	Details	
Tararua	FPP	8	missing info		Independent	8	Details	
Horowhenua	FPP	10	missing info		missing info		Details	
Kapiti Coast	FPP	14	missing info		Independent	14	Details	
Porirua	FPP	13	missing info		Independent	7	Details	
Porirua	FPP	13	missing info		Labour	6	Details	
Upper Hutt	FPP	10	missing info		Independent	10	Details	
Lower Hutt	FPP	11	missing info		Terris' Team	5	Details	
Lower Hutt	FPP	11	missing info		Independent	4	Details	
Lower Hutt	FPP	11	missing info		Hutt 2020 and Labour	2	Details	
Wellington	FPP	19	missing info		Independent	12	Details	
Wellington	FPP	19	missing info		Three 4 North	3	Details	
Wellington	FPP	19	missing info		Labour	2	Details	
Wellington	FPP	19	missing info		Alliance	1	Details	
Wellington	FPP	19	missing info		Green	1	Details	
Masterton	FPP	10	missing info		missing info		Details	
Carterton	FPP	8	missing info		Independent	8	Details	
South Wairarapa	FPP	9	missing info		Independent	9	Details	
Tasman	FPP	13	missing info		missing info		Details	
Nelson	FPP	12	missing info		missing info		Details	
Marlborough	FPP	13	missing info		Independent	13	Details	
Buller	FPP	11	missing info		missing info		Details	
Grey	FPP	8	missing info		Independent	8	Details	
Westland	FPP	12	missing info		Independent	12	Details	
Kaikoura	FPP	7	missing info		Independent	7	Details	
Hurunui	FPP	9	missing info		missing info		Details	
Waimakariri	FPP	14	missing info		Independent	14	Details	
Christchurch	FPP	24	Christchurch 2021 and Labour	11	Christchurch 2021, Labour, and Alliance	13	Details	
Christchurch	FPP	24	Citizens	7	Independent Citizens	7	Details	
Christchurch	FPP	24	Independent	3	Independent	4	Details	
Christchurch	FPP	24	True Independent	2			Details	
Christchurch	FPP	24	Alliance	1			Details	
Banks Peninsula	FPP	7	missing info		Independent	7	Details	
Selwyn	FPP	11	missing info		Independent	11	Details	
Ashburton	FPP	12	missing info		Independent	12	Details	
Timaru	FPP	12	missing info		Independent	12	Details	
Mackenzie	FPP	10	missing info		Independent	10	Details	
Waimate	FPP	8	missing info		Independent	8	Details	
Waitaki	FPP	15	missing info		Independent	15	Details	
Central Otago	FPP	13	missing info		Independent	13	Details	
Queenstown-Lakes	FPP	11	missing info		Independent	11	Details	
Dunedin	FPP	14	missing info		Independent	14	Details	
Clutha	FPP	14	missing info		Independent	14	Details	
Southland	FPP	12	missing info		Independent	12	Details	
Gore	FPP	11	missing info		Independent	11	Details	
Invercargill	FPP	12	missing info		Independent	12	Details	
Chatham Islands	FPP	8	missing info		Independent	8	Details	
All 74 councils		874						

=== Mayoral elections ===
Territorial authority	Incumbent	Elected	Runner-up	Details	Refs
Far North	Yvonne Sharp (Ind)		Carl Maria (Ind)	Details	
Whangarei	Craig Brown (Ind)		Calvin Green (Ind)	Details	
Kaipara	Graeme Ramsey (Ind)		unopposed	Details	
Rodney	(Ind)	John Law (Ind)	Greg Sayers (Ind)	Details	
Auckland City	Christine Fletcher (Ind)	John Banks (Ind)	Chris Fletcher (Ind)	Details	
North Shore	George Wood (Ind)		Joel Cayford (Ind)	Details	
Waitakere	Bob Harvey (Ind)		Vanessa Neeson (Ind)	Details	
Manukau	Barry Curtis (Ind)		Cliff McMahon (Ind)	Details	
Papakura	David Buist (Ind)		T H Maxwell (Ind)	Details	
Franklin	Heather Maloney (Ind)		Don Swales (Ind)	Details	
Thames-Coromandel	Chris Lux (Ind)		Margaret Hawkeswood (Ind)	Details	
Hauraki	Basil Morrison (Ind)		? (Ind)	Details	
Waikato	Angus Macdonald (Ind)	Peter Harris (Ind)	? (Ind)	Details	
Matamata-Piako	Hugh Vercoe (Ind)		Mark Troughton (Ind)	Details	
Hamilton	Russ Rimmington (Ind)	David Braithwaite (Ind)	Russ Rimmington (Ind)	Details	
Waipa	John Hewitt (Ind)	Alan Livingston (Ind)	? (Ind)	Details	
Otorohanga	Eric Tait (Ind)		unopposed	Details	
South Waikato	Gordon Blake (Ind)		? (Ind)	Details	
Waitomo	Steve Parry (Ind)	Allan Andrews (Ind)	? (Ind)	Details	
Taupo	Joan Williamson (Ind)	Clayton Stent (Ind)	? (Ind)	Details	
Western Bay of Plenty	Maureen Anderson (Ind)	Graeme Weld (Ind)	? (Ind)	Details	
Tauranga	Noel Pope (Ind)	Jan Beange (Ind)	Stuart Crosby (Ind)	Details	
Rotorua	Grahame Hall (Ind)		? (Ind)	Details	
Whakatane	Colin Hammond (Ind)		Christine Chambers (Ind)	Details	
Kawerau	Lyn Hartley (Ind)	Malcolm Campbell (Ind)	? (Ind)	Details	
Opotiki	Don Riesterer (Ind)	John Forbes (Ind)	Murray Thompson (Ind)	Details	
Gisborne	John Clarke (Ind)	Meng Foon (Ind)	Geoff Swainson (Ind)	Details	
Wairoa	Derek Fox (Ind)	Les Probert (Ind)	? (Ind)	Details	
Hastings	Jeremy Dwyer (Ind)	Lawrence Yule (Ind)	Dinah Williams (Ind)	Details	
Napier	Alan Dick (Ind)	Barbara Arnott (Ind)	Tony Reid (Ind)	Details	
Central Hawke's Bay	Hamish Kynoch (Ind)	Tim Gilbertson (Ind)	Hamish Kynoch (Ind)	Details	
New Plymouth	Claire Stewart (Ind)	Peter Tennent (Ind)	Maurice Betts (Ind)	Details	
Stratford	Brian Jeffares (Ind)		? (Ind)	Details	
South Taranaki	Mary Bourke (Ind)		Jeffrey Ward (Ind)	Details	
Ruapehu	Weston Kirton (Ind)	Sue Morris (Ind)	Weston Kirton (Ind)	Details	
Wanganui	Chas Poynter (Ind)		? (Ind)	Details	
Rangitikei	John Vickers (Ind)	Bob Buchanan (Ind)	? (Ind)	Details	
Manawatu	Audrey Severinsen (Ind)		? (Ind)	Details	
Palmerston North	? (Ind)	Mark Bell-Booth (Ind)	Jill White (Ind)	Details	
Tararua	Maureen Reynolds (Ind)		? (Ind)	Details	
Horowhenua	Tom Robinson (Ind)		? (Ind)	Details	
Kapiti Coast	Iride McCloy (Ind)	Alan Milne (Ind)	Nigel Wilson (Ind)	Details	
Porirua	Jenny Brash (Ind)		unopposed	Details	
Upper Hutt	Rex Kirton (Ind)	Wayne Guppy (Ind)	Heather Newell (Ind)	Details	
Lower Hutt	John Terris (Ind)		Scott Dalziell (Ind)	Details	
Wellington	Mark Blumsky (Ind)	Kerry Prendergast (Ind)	Mary Varnham (Ind)	Details	
Masterton	Bob Francis (Ind)		? (Ind)	Details	
Carterton	Martin Tankersley (Ind)		? (Ind)	Details	
South Wairarapa	John Read (Ind)		Garrick Emms (Ind)	Details	
Tasman	John Hurley (Ind)		Colleen Marshall (Ind)	Details	
Nelson	Paul Matheson (Ind)		? (Ind)	Details	
Marlborough	Gerald Hope (Ind)	Tom Harrison (Ind)	Gerald Hope (Ind)	Details	
Buller	Pat O'Dea (Ind)		? (Ind)	Details	
Grey	Kevin Brown (Ind)		? (Ind)	Details	
Westland	John Drylie (Ind)		Allen Hurley (Ind)	Details	
Kaikoura	Jim Abernathy (Ind)		? (Ind)	Details	
Hurunui	John Chaffey (Ind)	Tony Arps (Ind)	Fran Perriam (Ind)	Details	
Waimakariri	Janice Skurr (Ind)	Jim Gerard (Ind)	Jo Kane (Ind)	Details	
Christchurch	Garry Moore (Ind)		George Balani (Ind)	Details	
Banks Peninsula	Noeline Allen (Ind)	Bob Parker (Ind)	Val McClimont (Ind)	Details	
Selwyn	Michael McEvedy (Ind)		Bill Woods (Ind)	Details	
Ashburton	Murray Anderson (Ind)		? (Ind)	Details	
Timaru	Wynne Raymond (Ind)		Richard Lyon (Ind)	Details	
Mackenzie	Neil Anderson (Ind)	Stan Scorringe (Ind)	? (Ind)	Details	
Waimate	David Owen (Ind)		Peter McIlraith (Ind)	Details	
Waitaki	Duncan Taylor (Ind)	Alan McLay (Ind)	Helen Brookes (Ind)	Details	
Central Otago	Bill McIntosh (Ind)	Malcolm MacPherson (Ind)	Edna McAtamney (Ind)	Details	
Queenstown-Lakes	Warren Cooper (Ind)	Cleve Geddes (Ind)	Simon Hayes (Ind)	Details	
Dunedin	Sukhi Turner (Ind)		Peter Chin (Ind)	Details	
Clutha	Juno Hayes (Ind)		Vanessa Robertson-Briggs (Ind)	Details	
Southland	Frana Cardno (Ind)		unopposed	Details	
Gore	Mary Ogg (Ind)	Owen O'Connor (Ind)	Mary Ogg (Ind)	Details	
Invercargill	Tim Shadbolt (Ind)		unopposed	Details	
Chatham Islands	Patrick Smith (Ind)		? (Ind)	Details	

== Details ==
=== North Island ===
- Results in Northland
  - Far North District Council
  - Whangārei District Council
  - Kaipara District Council
- Results in Auckland
  - Rodney District Council
  - Auckland City Council (main)
  - North Shore City Council
  - Waitakere City Council
  - Manukau City Council
  - Papakura District Council
  - Franklin District Council
- Results in the Waikato
  - Thames-Coromandel District Council
  - Hauraki District Council
  - Waikato District Council
  - Matamata-Piako District Council
  - Hamilton City Council (main)
  - Waipā District Council
  - Ōtorohanga District Council
  - South Waikato District Council
  - Waitomo District Council
  - Taupō District Council
- Results in the Bay of Plenty
  - Western Bay of Plenty District Council
  - Rotorua District Council
  - Whakatāne District Council
  - Kawerau District Council
  - Ōpōtiki District Council
- Results in Gisborne
  - Gisborne District Council
- Results in Hawke's Bay
  - Wairoa District Council
  - Hastings District Council
  - Napier City Council
  - Central Hawke's Bay District Council
- Results in Taranaki
  - New Plymouth District Council
  - Stratford District Council
  - South Taranaki District Council
- Results in Manawatū-Whanganui
  - Ruapehu District Council
  - Whanganui District Council
  - Rangitīkei District Council
  - Manawatū District Council
  - Palmerston North City Council
  - Tararua District Council
  - Horowhenua District Council
- Results in Greater Wellington
  - Kāpiti Coast District Council
  - Porirua City Council (main)
  - Upper Hutt City Council
  - Hutt City Council (main)
  - Wellington City Council (main)
  - Masterton District Council
  - Carterton District Council
  - South Wairarapa District Council

=== South Island ===
- Results in the Upper South Island
  - Tasman District Council
  - Nelson City Council
  - Marlborough District Council
- Results in the West Coast
  - Buller District Council
  - Grey District Council
  - Westland District Council
- Results in Canterbury
  - Kaikōura District Council
  - Hurunui District Council
  - Waimakariri District Council
  - Christchurch City Council (main)
  - Banks Peninsula District Council
  - Selwyn District Council
  - Ashburton District Council
  - Timaru District Council
  - Mackenzie District Council
  - Waimate District Council
- Results in Otago
  - Waitaki District Council
  - Central Otago District Council
  - Queenstown-Lakes District Council
  - Dunedin City Council (main)
  - Clutha District Council
- Results in Southland
  - Southland District Council
  - Gore District Council
  - Invercargill City Council

=== Other ===
- Results in the Chatham Islands
  - Chatham Islands Council

== See also ==
- Results of the 2001 New Zealand regional council elections
