= 2001 New Zealand local elections =

Local elections in New Zealand

- 13 October 2001
- Registered: 2,537,760
- Turnout: 1,197,783 (47.20%)
- 86 of 86 councils
Party	Councils	+/–
No majority	82	
Christchurch 2021	1	0
TW	1	
This lists parties that won seats. See the complete results below.
- 74 mayors, 874 local councillors, and 134 regional councillors
Party	Seats	+/–
Mayors
Independent	70	
Christchurch 2021	1	0
TW	1	
CVTT	1	
Pakuranga Ratepayers and Residents Team	1	
Local councillors
Independent	691	
Labour	14	
Christchurch 2021	13	+2
Citizens and Ratepayers	10	
TW	9	
Independent Citizens	7	
CVTT	5	
City Vision	3	
Hamilton First	3	
Howick Community Spirit	3	
Papakura Vision	3	
Papatoetoe Independents	3	
The Proven Team	3	
Three 4 North	3	
Pakuranga Ratepayers and Residents Team	1	
Alliance	1	
Green	1	
Other local groups (Note: Includes groups not listed above; groups listed above include nation-wide groups, groups that elected a mayor, or groups with at least 3 councillors.)	23	
vacant	1	
missing info	77	
Regional councillors
Independent	117	
Christchurch 2021	6	
Citizens and Ratepayers	3	
Advancing Auckland	2	
TW	2	
Independent Citizens	1	
Hutt 2020	1	
CVTT	1	
Hamilton First	1	
This lists parties that won seats. See the complete results below.

The 2001 New Zealand local elections (Māori: Nga Pōtitanga ā-Rohe 2001) were triennial elections that were held ending 13 October 2001 to elect local mayors and councillors, regional councillors, and members of various other local government bodies.

All 12 of New Zealand's regions and all 74 of New Zealand's cities and districts participated in the elections.

== Key dates ==
Key dates relating to the local elections were as follows:

27 July	Nominations open
24 August	Last day of candidate nominations and withdrawals, closed at noon. Unopposed candidates are declared nominated to office.
21–26 September	Postal ballots to be sent out where required.
13 October	Polling day – Polls open 9am to 7pm. Postal ballots must be returned to returning officer before poll close.

== Background ==
=== Voting system ===
The 2001 local elections were the last occasion when first-past-the-post voting (FPP) was used exclusively. From the 2004 elections onwards, territorial authorities and regional councils could choose between FPP and the single transferable vote (STV) method. District health board elections had to use STV from 2004 and were changed to at-large elections.

== List of elections and results ==
=== Regional councils ===
Twelve regions had regional councils separate to the local territorial authorities; regional councils manage issues related to the environment and public transport, among others. 134 regional councillors were elected across all eleven regions.

Council	Electoral system	Seats	Chair	Councillors	Control	Turnout	Details	Refs
Northland	FPP	8	missing info	▌ Independent 8	▌ No majority	42,081; 44.61% ? pp	Details	
Auckland	FPP	13	missing info	▌ Independent 6 ▌ C&R 3 ▌ Advancing Auckland 2 ▌ Team West 2	▌ No majority	340,999; 43.35% ? pp	Details	
Waikato	FPP	14	missing info	▌ Independent 13 ▌ Hamilton First 1	▌ No majority	98,613; 49% ? pp	Details	
Bay of Plenty	FPP	12	missing info	▌ Independent 12	▌ No majority	71,011; 52% ? pp	Details	
Hawke's Bay	FPP	9	missing info	▌ Independent 9	▌ No majority	48,730; 55% ? pp	Details	
Taranaki	FPP	10	missing info	▌ Independent 10	▌ No majority	32,136; 61% ? pp	Details	
Manawatu-Wanganui	FPP	11	missing info	▌ Independent 11	▌ No majority	42,678; 53% ? pp	Details	
Wellington	FPP	13	missing info	▌ Independent 11 ▌ Hutt 2020 1 ▌ Terris' Team 1	▌ No majority	119,467; 50% ? pp	Details	
West Coast	FPP	6	missing info	▌ Independent 6	▌ No majority	17,858; 78.55% ? pp	Details	
Canterbury	FPP	14	missing info	▌ Independent 7 ▌ Christchurch 2021 6 ▌ Independent Citizens 1	▌ No majority	168,228; 52% ? pp	Details	
Otago	FPP	12	missing info	▌ Independent 12	▌ No majority	81,383; 60.64% ? pp	Details	
Southland	FPP	12	missing info	▌ Independent 12	▌ No majority	34,840; 59% ? pp	Details	
12 of 12 councils		134						

=== Territorial authorities ===
In total, 16 city councils and 58 district councils (74 territorial authorities in total) held elections in 2001; territorial authorities manage local issues such as roads, building consents, water supply and sanitation, among others. Some territorial authorities also manage regional issues and are known as unitary authorities. The Chatham Islands territorial authority has some of the powers of a regional council but not all. Candidates were also elected to community boards and licensing trusts.

==== Overall ====
Council	Electoral system	Seats	Councillors				Details	Refs
Council	Electoral system	Seats	1998		Elected		Details	Refs
Far North	FPP	10	missing info		Independent	6	Details	
Far North	FPP	10	missing info		The Proven Team	3	Details	
Far North	FPP	10	missing info		Community First	1	Details	
Whangarei	FPP	13	missing info		Independent	13	Details	
Kaipara	FPP	10	missing info		Independent	9	Details	
Kaipara	FPP	10	missing info		Residents and Ratepayers	1	Details	
Rodney	FPP	12	missing info		Independent	12	Details	
Auckland	FPP	19	missing info		Citizens and Ratepayers	10	Details	
Auckland	FPP	19	missing info		Independent	3	Details	
Auckland	FPP	19	missing info		City Vision	3	Details	
Auckland	FPP	19	missing info		Labour	2	Details	
Auckland	FPP	19	missing info		Team Auckland	1	Details	
North Shore	FPP	15	missing info		Independent	15	Details	
Waitakere	FPP	14	missing info		Team West	9	Details	
Waitakere	FPP	14	missing info		Independent	3	Details	
Waitakere	FPP	14	missing info		Independent Ratepayers and Residents	2	Details	
Manukau	FPP	20	missing info		Labour	4	Details	
Manukau	FPP	20	missing info		Manurewa Residents	4	Details	
Manukau	FPP	20	missing info		Howick Community Spirit	3	Details	
Manukau	FPP	20	missing info		Papatoetoe Independents	3	Details	
Manukau	FPP	20	missing info		Independent	3	Details	
Manukau	FPP	20	missing info		Independent Ratepayers	1	Details	
Manukau	FPP	20	missing info		Pakuranga Ratepayers and Residents Team	1	Details	
Manukau	FPP	20	missing info		Pakuranga 2000	1	Details	
Papakura	FPP	8	missing info		Independent	4	Details	
Papakura	FPP	8	missing info		Papakura Vision	3	Details	
Papakura	FPP	8	missing info		Your Team	1	Details	
Franklin	FPP	14	missing info		Independent	14	Details	
Thames-Coromandel	FPP	9	missing info		Independent	9	Details	
Hauraki	FPP	13	missing info		Independent	13	Details	
Waikato	FPP	13	missing info		Independent	13	Details	
Matamata-Piako	FPP	11	missing info		Independent	11	Details	
Hamilton	FPP	13	missing info		Independent	7	Details	
Hamilton	FPP	13	missing info		Hamilton First	3	Details	
Hamilton	FPP	13	missing info		Proudly Independent	3	Details	
Waipa	FPP	12	missing info		Independent	12	Details	
Otorohanga	FPP	7	missing info		Independent	6	Details	
Otorohanga	FPP	7	missing info		vacant (Note: No candidates nominated for the Wharepuhunga ward; see 2002 Otorohanga District Council by-election)		Details	
South Waikato	FPP	13	missing info		Independent	13	Details	
Waitomo	FPP	6	missing info		Independent	6	Details	
Taupo	FPP	12	missing info		Independent	10	Details	
Taupo	FPP	12	missing info		Taupo Concerned Citizens	2	Details	
Western Bay of Plenty	FPP	12	missing info		Independent	9	Details	
Western Bay of Plenty	FPP	12	missing info		Resource Users Association	2	Details	
Western Bay of Plenty	FPP	12	missing info		Democracy Network in Action	1	Details	
Tauranga	FPP	13	missing info		Independent	13	Details	
Rotorua	FPP	12	missing info		Independent	12	Details	
Whakatane	FPP	13	missing info		Independent	13	Details	
Kawerau	FPP	8	missing info		Independent	8	Details	
Opotiki	FPP	10	missing info		Independent	10	Details	
Gisborne	FPP	14	missing info		Independent	13	Details	
Gisborne	FPP	14	missing info		Rates Reform	1	Details	
Wairoa	FPP	9	missing info		Independent	9	Details	
Hastings	FPP	15	missing info		Independent	15	Details	
Napier	FPP	12	missing info		Independent	12	Details	
Central Hawke's Bay	FPP	10	missing info		Independent	10	Details	
New Plymouth	FPP	16	missing info		Independent	16	Details	
Stratford	FPP	10	missing info		Independent	10	Details	
South Taranaki	FPP	12	missing info		Independent	12	Details	
Ruapehu	FPP	11	missing info		Independent	11	Details	
Wanganui	FPP	12	missing info		missing info		Details	
Rangitikei	FPP	11	missing info		Independent	11	Details	
Manawatu	FPP	10	missing info		Independent	10	Details	
Palmerston North	FPP	15	missing info		Independent	15	Details	
Tararua	FPP	8	missing info		Independent	8	Details	
Horowhenua	FPP	10	missing info		missing info		Details	
Kapiti Coast	FPP	14	missing info		Independent	14	Details	
Porirua	FPP	13	missing info		Independent	7	Details	
Porirua	FPP	13	missing info		Labour	6	Details	
Upper Hutt	FPP	10	missing info		Independent	10	Details	
Lower Hutt	FPP	11	missing info		Terris' Team	5	Details	
Lower Hutt	FPP	11	missing info		Independent	4	Details	
Lower Hutt	FPP	11	missing info		Hutt 2020 and Labour	2	Details	
Wellington	FPP	19	missing info		Independent	12	Details	
Wellington	FPP	19	missing info		Three 4 North	3	Details	
Wellington	FPP	19	missing info		Labour	2	Details	
Wellington	FPP	19	missing info		Alliance	1	Details	
Wellington	FPP	19	missing info		Green	1	Details	
Masterton	FPP	10	missing info		missing info		Details	
Carterton	FPP	8	missing info		Independent	8	Details	
South Wairarapa	FPP	9	missing info		Independent	9	Details	
Tasman	FPP	13	missing info		missing info		Details	
Nelson	FPP	12	missing info		missing info		Details	
Marlborough	FPP	13	missing info		Independent	13	Details	
Buller	FPP	11	missing info		missing info		Details	
Grey	FPP	8	missing info		Independent	8	Details	
Westland	FPP	12	missing info		Independent	12	Details	
Kaikoura	FPP	7	missing info		Independent	7	Details	
Hurunui	FPP	9	missing info		missing info		Details	
Waimakariri	FPP	14	missing info		Independent	14	Details	
Christchurch	FPP	24	Christchurch 2021 and Labour	11	Christchurch 2021, Labour, and Alliance	13	Details	
Christchurch	FPP	24	Citizens	7	Independent Citizens	7	Details	
Christchurch	FPP	24	Independent	3	Independent	4	Details	
Christchurch	FPP	24	True Independent	2			Details	
Christchurch	FPP	24	Alliance	1			Details	
Banks Peninsula	FPP	7	missing info		Independent	7	Details	
Selwyn	FPP	11	missing info		Independent	11	Details	
Ashburton	FPP	12	missing info		Independent	12	Details	
Timaru	FPP	12	missing info		Independent	12	Details	
Mackenzie	FPP	10	missing info		Independent	10	Details	
Waimate	FPP	8	missing info		Independent	8	Details	
Waitaki	FPP	15	missing info		Independent	15	Details	
Central Otago	FPP	13	missing info		Independent	13	Details	
Queenstown-Lakes	FPP	11	missing info		Independent	11	Details	
Dunedin	FPP	14	missing info		Independent	14	Details	
Clutha	FPP	14	missing info		Independent	14	Details	
Southland	FPP	12	missing info		Independent	12	Details	
Gore	FPP	11	missing info		Independent	11	Details	
Invercargill	FPP	12	missing info		Independent	12	Details	
Chatham Islands	FPP	8	missing info		Independent	8	Details	
All 74 councils		874						

==== Mayors ====
All territorial authorities (including unitary authorities) directly elect mayors.

Territorial authority	Incumbent	Elected	Runner-up	Details	Refs
Far North	Yvonne Sharp (Ind)		Carl Maria (Ind)	Details	
Whangarei	Craig Brown (Ind)		Calvin Green (Ind)	Details	
Kaipara	Graeme Ramsey (Ind)		unopposed	Details	
Rodney	(Ind)	John Law (Ind)	Greg Sayers (Ind)	Details	
Auckland City	Christine Fletcher (Ind)	John Banks (Ind)	Chris Fletcher (Ind)	Details	
North Shore	George Wood (Ind)		Joel Cayford (Ind)	Details	
Waitakere	Bob Harvey (Ind)		Vanessa Neeson (Ind)	Details	
Manukau	Barry Curtis (Ind)		Cliff McMahon (Ind)	Details	
Papakura	David Buist (Ind)		T H Maxwell (Ind)	Details	
Franklin	Heather Maloney (Ind)		Don Swales (Ind)	Details	
Thames-Coromandel	Chris Lux (Ind)		Margaret Hawkeswood (Ind)	Details	
Hauraki	Basil Morrison (Ind)		? (Ind)	Details	
Waikato	Angus Macdonald (Ind)	Peter Harris (Ind)	? (Ind)	Details	
Matamata-Piako	Hugh Vercoe (Ind)		Mark Troughton (Ind)	Details	
Hamilton	Russ Rimmington (Ind)	David Braithwaite (Ind)	Russ Rimmington (Ind)	Details	
Waipa	John Hewitt (Ind)	Alan Livingston (Ind)	? (Ind)	Details	
Otorohanga	Eric Tait (Ind)		unopposed	Details	
South Waikato	Gordon Blake (Ind)		? (Ind)	Details	
Waitomo	Steve Parry (Ind)	Allan Andrews (Ind)	? (Ind)	Details	
Taupo	Joan Williamson (Ind)	Clayton Stent (Ind)	? (Ind)	Details	
Western Bay of Plenty	Maureen Anderson (Ind)	Graeme Weld (Ind)	? (Ind)	Details	
Tauranga	Noel Pope (Ind)	Jan Beange (Ind)	Stuart Crosby (Ind)	Details	
Rotorua	Grahame Hall (Ind)		? (Ind)	Details	
Whakatane	Colin Hammond (Ind)		Christine Chambers (Ind)	Details	
Kawerau	Lyn Hartley (Ind)	Malcolm Campbell (Ind)	? (Ind)	Details	
Opotiki	Don Riesterer (Ind)	John Forbes (Ind)	Murray Thompson (Ind)	Details	
Gisborne	John Clarke (Ind)	Meng Foon (Ind)	Geoff Swainson (Ind)	Details	
Wairoa	Derek Fox (Ind)	Les Probert (Ind)	? (Ind)	Details	
Hastings	Jeremy Dwyer (Ind)	Lawrence Yule (Ind)	Dinah Williams (Ind)	Details	
Napier	Alan Dick (Ind)	Barbara Arnott (Ind)	Tony Reid (Ind)	Details	
Central Hawke's Bay	Hamish Kynoch (Ind)	Tim Gilbertson (Ind)	Hamish Kynoch (Ind)	Details	
New Plymouth	Claire Stewart (Ind)	Peter Tennent (Ind)	Maurice Betts (Ind)	Details	
Stratford	Brian Jeffares (Ind)		? (Ind)	Details	
South Taranaki	Mary Bourke (Ind)		Jeffrey Ward (Ind)	Details	
Ruapehu	Weston Kirton (Ind)	Sue Morris (Ind)	Weston Kirton (Ind)	Details	
Wanganui	Chas Poynter (Ind)		? (Ind)	Details	
Rangitikei	John Vickers (Ind)	Bob Buchanan (Ind)	? (Ind)	Details	
Manawatu	Audrey Severinsen (Ind)		? (Ind)	Details	
Palmerston North	? (Ind)	Mark Bell-Booth (Ind)	Jill White (Ind)	Details	
Tararua	Maureen Reynolds (Ind)		? (Ind)	Details	
Horowhenua	Tom Robinson (Ind)		? (Ind)	Details	
Kapiti Coast	Iride McCloy (Ind)	Alan Milne (Ind)	Nigel Wilson (Ind)	Details	
Porirua	Jenny Brash (Ind)		unopposed	Details	
Upper Hutt	Rex Kirton (Ind)	Wayne Guppy (Ind)	Heather Newell (Ind)	Details	
Lower Hutt	John Terris (Ind)		Scott Dalziell (Ind)	Details	
Wellington	Mark Blumsky (Ind)	Kerry Prendergast (Ind)	Mary Varnham (Ind)	Details	
Masterton	Bob Francis (Ind)		? (Ind)	Details	
Carterton	Martin Tankersley (Ind)		? (Ind)	Details	
South Wairarapa	John Read (Ind)		Garrick Emms (Ind)	Details	
Tasman	John Hurley (Ind)		Colleen Marshall (Ind)	Details	
Nelson	Paul Matheson (Ind)		? (Ind)	Details	
Marlborough	Gerald Hope (Ind)	Tom Harrison (Ind)	Gerald Hope (Ind)	Details	
Buller	Pat O'Dea (Ind)		? (Ind)	Details	
Grey	Kevin Brown (Ind)		? (Ind)	Details	
Westland	John Drylie (Ind)		Allen Hurley (Ind)	Details	
Kaikoura	Jim Abernathy (Ind)		? (Ind)	Details	
Hurunui	John Chaffey (Ind)	Tony Arps (Ind)	Fran Perriam (Ind)	Details	
Waimakariri	Janice Skurr (Ind)	Jim Gerard (Ind)	Jo Kane (Ind)	Details	
Christchurch	Garry Moore (Ind)		George Balani (Ind)	Details	
Banks Peninsula	Noeline Allen (Ind)	Bob Parker (Ind)	Val McClimont (Ind)	Details	
Selwyn	Michael McEvedy (Ind)		Bill Woods (Ind)	Details	
Ashburton	Murray Anderson (Ind)		? (Ind)	Details	
Timaru	Wynne Raymond (Ind)		Richard Lyon (Ind)	Details	
Mackenzie	Neil Anderson (Ind)	Stan Scorringe (Ind)	? (Ind)	Details	
Waimate	David Owen (Ind)		Peter McIlraith (Ind)	Details	
Waitaki	Duncan Taylor (Ind)	Alan McLay (Ind)	Helen Brookes (Ind)	Details	
Central Otago	Bill McIntosh (Ind)	Malcolm MacPherson (Ind)	Edna McAtamney (Ind)	Details	
Queenstown-Lakes	Warren Cooper (Ind)	Cleve Geddes (Ind)	Simon Hayes (Ind)	Details	
Dunedin	Sukhi Turner (Ind)		Peter Chin (Ind)	Details	
Clutha	Juno Hayes (Ind)		Vanessa Robertson-Briggs (Ind)	Details	
Southland	Frana Cardno (Ind)		unopposed	Details	
Gore	Mary Ogg (Ind)	Owen O'Connor (Ind)	Mary Ogg (Ind)	Details	
Invercargill	Tim Shadbolt (Ind)		unopposed	Details	
Chatham Islands	Patrick Smith (Ind)		? (Ind)	Details	

=== District health boards ===
District health boards (DHBs) were established in January 2001 through the New Zealand Public Health and Disability Act 2000. At that time, the 21 DHBs had their boards appointed by the Minister of Health, Annette King. Each board has up to eleven members and seven of those are elected in local elections. As defined in section 7 of the Local Electoral Act 2001, board members for DHBs are to be elected as part of the local elections. The 2001 local elections were thus the inaugural elections for the country's then 21 DHBs. Elections were based on candidacies in local wards.

== See also ==
- Local elections in New Zealand
