= Results of the 2001 New Zealand territorial authority elections in Hawke's Bay =

Local elections in New Zealand

2001 New Zealand territorial authority elections (Hawke's Bay)
- 13 October 2001
- 4 of 4 local councils
Party	Councils	+/–
No majority	4	0
This lists parties that won seats. See the complete results below.
- 4 mayors and 41 local councillors
Party	Seats	+/–
Mayors
Independent	4	0
Local councillors
Independent	46	0
This lists parties that won seats. See the complete results below.

Elections for the territorial authorities of New Zealand were held from September until 13 October 2001 as part of that year's nation-wide local elections. 865 local councillors and 74 mayors were elected across all 74 councils.

4 territorial authorities were located within the Hawke's Bay Region. 4 mayors and 46 district and city councillors were elected.

== Wairoa District Council ==
2001 Wairoa District Council election
- 13 October 2001
- Registered: 5,698
- Turnout: 3,723 (65.34%)
- Mayoral election
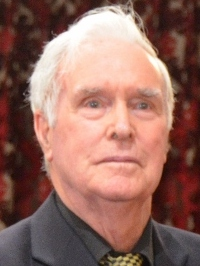

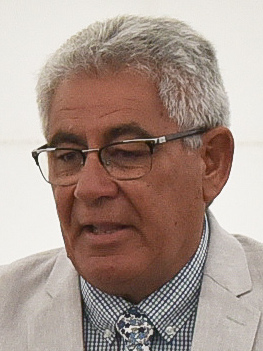

Candidate	Les Probert	Derek Fox	?
Affiliation	Independent	Independent	Independent
Popular vote	1,896	1,247	569
Percentage	50.93%	33.49%	15.28%
Mayor before election
Derek Fox
Independent
Elected mayor
Les Probert
Independent
- Council election
- 9 seats on the Wairoa District Council; 6 seats needed for a majority
Party	Seats	+/–
Independent	9	0
This lists parties that won seats. See the complete results below.

=== Composition summary ===
Ward	Previous		Elected	
Mayor	?	Derek Fox	Independent	Les Probert
Wairoa	?	missing info	Independent	Denise Eaglesome
Wairoa	?	missing info	Independent	Carey Gregory
Wairoa	?	missing info	Independent	Judy Harrison
Wairoa	?	missing info	Independent	John Petersen
Mahia	?	missing info	Independent	Des Blake
Nuhaka / Tuhara	?	missing info	Independent	Huia Koziol
Frasertown	?	missing info	Independent	Mike Burton
Waikaremoana / Ruakituri	?	missing info	Independent	Peter Crarer
Mohaka / Waiau	?	missing info	Independent	Wayne Taylor
^{R} retired

=== 2001 Wairoa mayoral election ===
2001 Wairoa mayoral election
Affiliation	Candidate	Vote	%	+/−
Independent	Les Probert	1,896	50.93	?
Independent	Derek Fox	1,247	33.49	?
Independent	?	569	15.28	?
Informal		11	0.30	?
Turnout		3,723	(65.34)	?
Registered		5,698		
Independent gain from Independent				

=== Wairoa ward ===
Wairoa ward
Affiliation	Candidate	Vote	%	+/−
Independent	Denise Eaglesome	?	?	?
Independent	Carey Gregory	?	?	?
Independent	Judy Harrison	?	?	?
Independent	John Petersen	?	?	?
Independent	?	?	?	?
...	...	...	...	...
Informal		?	?	?
Turnout		?	?	?
Registered		?		
Independent win (Note: Missing information on incumbent affiliation)				
Independent win				
Independent win				
Independent win				

=== Mahia ward ===
Mahia ward
Affiliation	Candidate	Vote	%	+/−
Independent	Des Blake	?	?	?
Independent	?	?	?	?
...	...	...	...	...
Informal		?	?	
Turnout		?	?	
Registered		?		
Independent win				

=== Nuhaka/Tuhara ward ===
Nuhaka/Tuhara ward
Affiliation	Candidate	Vote	%	+/−
Independent	Huia Koziol	?	?	?
Independent	?	?	?	?
...	...	...	...	...
Informal		?	?	?
Turnout		?	?	?
Registered		?		
Independent win				

=== Frasertown ward ===
Frasertown ward
Affiliation	Candidate	Vote	%	+/−
Independent	Mike Burton	?	?	?
Independent	?	?	?	?
...	...	...	...	...
Informal		?	?	?
Turnout		?	?	?
Registered		?		
Independent win				

=== Waikaremoana/Ruakituri ward ===
Waikaremoana/Ruakituri ward
Affiliation	Candidate	Vote	%	+/−
Independent	Peter Crarer	?	?	?
Independent	?	?	?	?
...	...	...	...	...
Informal		?	?	?
Turnout		?	?	?
Registered		?		
Independent win				

=== Mohaka/Waiau ward ===
Mohaka/Waiau ward
Affiliation	Candidate	Vote	%	+/−
Independent	Wayne Taylor	?	?	?
Independent	?	?	?	?
...	...	...	...	...
Informal		?	?	?
Turnout		?	?	?
Registered		?		
Independent win				

== Hastings District Council ==
2001 Hastings District Council election
- 13 October 2001
- Registered: 45,089
- Turnout: 22,974 (50.95%)
- Mayoral election
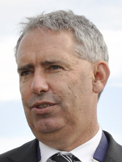

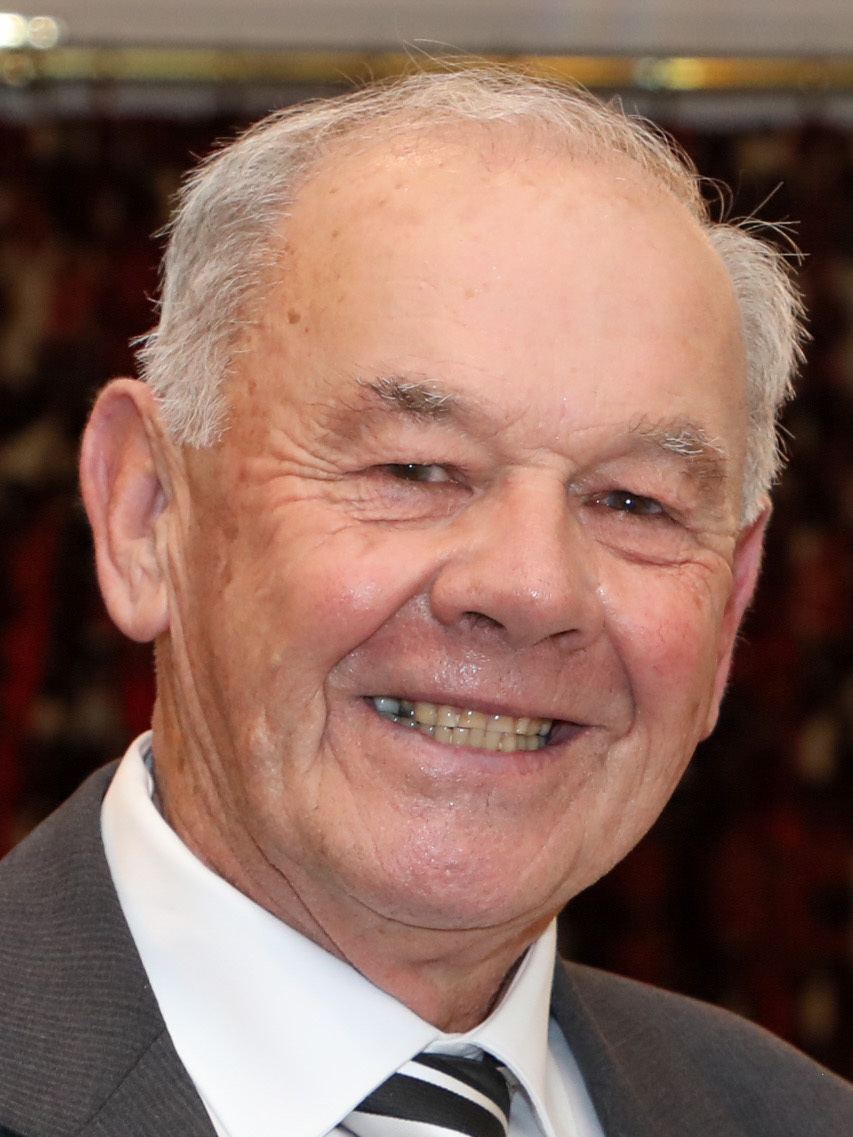
Candidate	Lawrence Yule	Dinah Williams	Kevin Watkins
Affiliation	Independent	Independent	Independent
Popular vote	16,644	3,467	2,846
Percentage	72.45%	15.09%	12.39%
Mayor before election
Jeremy Dwyer
Independent
Elected mayor
Lawrence Yule
Independent
- Council election
- 15 seats on the Hastings District Council; 9 seats needed for a majority
Party	Seats	+/–
Independent	15	0
This lists parties that won seats. See the complete results below.

=== Composition summary ===
Ward	Previous		Elected	
Mayor	?	Jeremy Dwyer	Independent	Lawrence Yule
Hastings	?	missing info	Independent	Dean Hyde
Hastings	?	missing info	Independent	Cynthia Bowers
Hastings	?	missing info	Independent	Kevin Watkins
Hastings	?	missing info	Independent	Margaret Twigg
Hastings	?	missing info	Independent	Norman Speers
Flaxmere	?	missing info	Independent	Judith Baxter
Flaxmere	?	missing info	Independent	Keriana Poulain
Havelock North	?	missing info	Independent	Richard Jones
Havelock North	?	missing info	Independent	Dinah Williams
Clive	?	missing info	Independent	Mary Hannan
Heretaunga	?	missing info	Independent	Chase Arguette
Kaweka	?	missing info	Independent	Deborah Turner
Maraekakaho	?	missing info	Independent	Michael Lester
Poukawa	?	missing info	Independent	Derek Brownrigg
Tutira	?	missing info	Independent	Tim Tinker
^{R} retired

=== 2001 Hastings mayoral election ===
2001 Hastings mayoral election
Affiliation	Candidate	Vote	%
Independent	Lawrence Yule	16,644	72.45
Independent	Dinah Williams	3,467	15.09
Independent	Kevin Watkins	2,846	12.39
Informal		17	0.07
Turnout		22,974	(50.95)
Registered		45,089	
Independent gain from Independent			

=== Hastings ward ===
Hastings ward
Affiliation	Candidate	Vote	%
Independent	Dean Hyde	5,308	?
Independent	Cynthia Bowers	5,252	?
Independent	Kevin Watkins	5,118	?
Independent	Margaret Twigg	5,014	?
Independent	Norman Speers	4,773	?
Independent	Graeme Mills	4,370	?
Independent	Megan Williams	4,257	?
Independent	George Woodham	3,412	?
Informal		2	?
Turnout		?	?
Registered		?	
Independent win			
Independent win			
Independent win			
Independent win			
Independent win			

=== Flaxmere ward ===
Flaxmere war
Affiliation	Candidate	Vote
Independent	Judith Baxter	Unopposed
Independent	Keriana Poulain	Unopposed
Registered		?
Independent win		
Independent win		

=== Havelock North ward ===
Havelock North ward
Affiliation	Candidate	Vote	%
Independent	Richard Jones	3,290	?
Independent	Dinah Williams	2,897	?
Independent	John Timpson	1,946	?
Informal		1	?
Turnout		?	?
Registered		?	
Independent win			
Independent win			

=== Clive ward ===
Clive war
Affiliation	Candidate	Vote
Independent	Mary Hannan	Unopposed
Registered		?
Independent win		

=== Heretaunga ward ===
Heretaunga ward
Affiliation	Candidate	Vote	%
Independent	Chase Arguette	869	55.39
Independent	Malcolm Crawford-Flett	700	44.61
Informal		0	0.00
Turnout		1,569	?
Registered		?	
Independent win			

=== Kaweka ward ===
Kaweka ward
Affiliation	Candidate	Vote	%
Independent	Lawrence Yule (withdrawn)	630	58.12
Independent	Deborah Turner	319	29.43
Independent	Ann Tweedie	135	12.45
Informal		0	0.00
Turnout		1,084	?
Registered		?	
Independent win			

=== Maraekakaho ward ===
Maraekakaho ward
Affiliation	Candidate	Vote	%
Independent	Michael Lester	538	70.23
Independent	Lester White	228	29.77
Informal		0	0.00
Turnout		766	?
Registered		?	
Independent win			

=== Poukawa ward ===
Poukawa war
Affiliation	Candidate	Vote
Independent	Derek Brownrigg	Unopposed
Registered		?
Independent win		

=== Tutira ward ===
Tutira war
Affiliation	Candidate	Vote
Independent	Tim Tinker	Unopposed
Registered		?
Independent win		

== Napier City Council ==
2001 Napier City Council election
- 13 October 2001
- Registered: 38,419
- Turnout: 21,486 (55.93%)
- Mayoral election
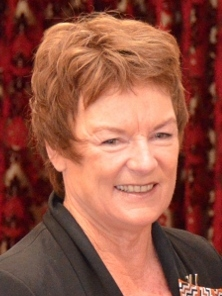

Candidate	Barbara Arnott	Tony Reid
Affiliation	Independent	Independent
Popular vote	13,823	5,476
Percentage	64.33%	25.49%
Mayor before election
Alan Dick
Independent
Elected mayor
Barbara Arnott
Independent
- Council election
- 12 seats on the Napier City Council; 7 seats needed for a majority
Party	Seats	+/–
Independent	12	0
This lists parties that won seats. See the complete results below.

=== Composition summary ===
Ward	Previous		Elected	
Mayor	?	Alan Dick	Independent	Barbara Arnott
At-large	?	missing info	Independent	Tony Jeffery
At-large	?	missing info	Independent	Kathie Furlong
At-large	?	missing info	Independent	John Harrison
At-large	?	missing info	Independent	Harry Lawson
At-large	?	missing info	Independent	Dave Pipe
At-large	?	missing info	Independent	Denyse Watkins
At-large	?	missing info	Independent	Faye White
At-large	?	missing info	Independent	Stan Simmonds
At-large	?	missing info	Independent	Tony Reid
At-large	?	missing info	Independent	Mark Herbert
At-large	?	missing info	Independent	David Bosley
At-large	?	missing info	Independent	Annemarie Wedd
^{R} retired

=== 2001 Napier mayoral election ===
2001 Napier mayoral election
Affiliation	Candidate	Vote	%	+/−
Independent	Barbara Arnott	13,823	64.33	?
Independent	Tony Reid	5,476	25.49	?
Informal		2,187	10.18	?
Turnout		21,486	(55.93)	?
Registered		38,419		
Independent gain from Independent				

=== At-large ===
At-large
Affiliation	Candidate	Vote	%	+/−
Independent	Tony Jeffery	11,892	55.35	?
Independent	Kathie Furlong^{†}	11,248	52.35	?
Independent	John Harrison^{†}	10,581	49.25	?
Independent	Harry Lawson^{†}	10,039	46.72	?
Independent	Dave Pipe^{†}	9,859	45.89	?
Independent	Denyse Watkins^{†}	9,606	44.71	?
Independent	Faye White	8,604	40.04	?
Independent	Stan Simmonds^{†}	8,021	37.33	?
Independent	Tony Reid^{†}	7,977	37.13	?
Independent	Mark Herbert^{†}	7,445	34.65	?
Independent	David Bosley	7,416	34.52	?
Independent	Annemarie Wedd	7,406	34.47	?
Independent	Tom Johnson	6,988	32.52	?
Independent	Alan Dick	6,926	32.23	?
Independent	Peter Gibson	6,860	31.93	?
Independent	Peter Grant	6,600	30.72	?
Independent	Robin Gwynn	6,351	29.56	?
Independent	Ros Stewart	6,294	29.29	?
Independent	Terry O'Connor	5,660	26.34	?
Independent	Joan Kuzmich	5,256	24.46	?
Independent	Stu McLachlan	4,775	22.22	?
Independent	Glyn Lawrence	4,612	21.47	?
Independent	Kerry Single	4,523	21.05	?
Independent	Brian Quirk	4,062	18.91	?
Independent	Christiaan Briggs	2,933	13.65	?
Independent	Derek Williams	2,686	12.50	?
Independent	Rod Valenta	2,628	12.23	?
Independent	David Hannay	2,567	11.95	?
Informal		243	1.13	?
Turnout		21,486	(55.93)	?
Registered		38,419		
Independent win				
Independent win				
Independent win				
Independent win				
Independent win				
Independent win				
Independent win				
Independent win				
Independent win				
Independent win				
Independent win				
Independent win				
^{†} incumbent

== Central Hawke's Bay District Council ==
2001 Central Hawke's Bay District Council election
- 13 October 2001
- Registered: 8,582
- Turnout: 5,391 (62.82%)
- Mayoral election
Candidate	Tim Gilbertson	Hamish Kynoch
Affiliation	Independent	Independent
Popular vote	?	?
Percentage	?	?
Mayor before election
Hamish Kynoch
Independent
Elected mayor
Tim Gilbertson
Independent
- Council election
- 10 seats on the Central Hawke's Bay District Council; 6 seats needed for a majority
Party	Seats	+/–
Independent	10	0
This lists parties that won seats. See the complete results below.

=== Composition summary ===
Ward	Previous		Elected	
Mayor	?	Hamish Kynoch	Independent	Tim Gilbertson
Aramoana	?	missing info	Independent	Michael Harding
Aramoana	?	missing info	Independent	James Hunter
Ruahine	?	missing info	Independent	Brian Gibbs
Ruahine	?	missing info	Independent	Roger Jull
Ruahine	?	missing info	Independent	David Tennant
Ruataniwha	?	missing info	Independent	Nicolette Brasell
Ruataniwha	?	missing info	Independent	Russell Chant
Ruataniwha	?	missing info	Independent	Trish Giddens
Ruataniwha	?	missing info	Independent	Terry Kingston
Ruataniwha	?	missing info	Independent	Michael Waite
^{R} retired

=== 2001 Central Hawke's Bay mayoral election ===
2001 Central Hawke's Bay mayoral election
Affiliation	Candidate	Vote	%
Independent	Tim Gilberston	?	?
Independent	Hamish Kynoch^{†}	?	?
Informal		0	0.00
Turnout		5,391	(62.82)
Registered		8,582	
Independent gain from Independent			
^{†} incumbent

=== Aramoana ward ===
Aramoana ward
Affiliation	Candidate	Vote	%
Independent	Michael Harding	?	?
Independent	James Hunter	?	?
Independent	?	?	?
...	...	...	...
Informal		?	?
Turnout		?	?
Registered		?	
Independent win			
Independent win			

=== Ruahine ward ===
Ruahine ward
Affiliation	Candidate	Vote	%
Independent	Brian Gibbs	?	?
Independent	Roger Jull	?	?
Independent	David Tennant	?	?
Independent	?	?	?
...	...	...	...
Informal		?	?
Turnout		?	?
Registered		?	
Independent win			
Independent win			
Independent win			

=== Ruataniwha ward ===
Ruataniwha ward
Affiliation	Candidate	Vote	%
Independent	Nicolette Brasell	?	?
Independent	Russell Chant	?	?
Independent	Trish Giddens	?	?
Independent	Terry Kingston	?	?
Independent	Michael Waite	?	?
Independent	?	?	?
...	...	...	...
Informal		?	?
Turnout		?	?
Registered		?	
Independent win			
Independent win			
Independent win			
Independent win			
Independent win			

== See also ==
- 2001 Hawke's Bay Regional Council election
