= Mary Ogg =

New Zealand politician (1944/1945 – 2022)

Mary Ogg QSO

2nd Mayor of Gore District
- In office 1995–2001
- Preceded by: Ian Tulloch
- Succeeded by: Owen O'Connor

Personal details
- Born: Mary Elizabeth McKinlay; 1944 or 1945
- Died: 6 October 2022 (aged 77) Gore, New Zealand
- Spouse: David Ogg (m. 1968)
- Occupation: Nurse

Mary Elizabeth Ogg QSO (née McKinlay; 1944 or 1945 – 6 October 2022) was a New Zealand local politician. She served as the mayor of Gore from 1995 until 2001, and was the first woman to hold that position.

== Biography ==
Ogg was born Mary Elizabeth McKinlay, the daughter of Bessy and Parker McKinlay, and grew up in Invercargill. In August 1968, she married David John Ogg at the Church of St Theresa of Lisieux in Invercargill. Her wedding dress is now held in the collection of the Gore Historical Museum.

A district nurse, Ogg advocated for comprehensive health services in Gore and eastern Southland, and served as a member of the Southland District Health Board.

Ogg was elected mayor of Gore in 1995, and served in that role for two terms, before being defeated by Owen O'Connor at the 2001 local elections. She was the first woman to be elected mayor of Gore, and the third woman to serve as a mayor in the Southland Region, after Eve Poole in Invercargill and Frana Cardno in Southland District. Following the announcement that Seddon Memorial Hospital in Gore would close in 1999, Ogg actively and successfully campaigned for a new hospital to be built in Gore.

In the 2002 New Year Honours, Ogg was appointed a Companion of the Queen's Service Order, for public services. The next year, her husband, David, was made a Member of the New Zealand Order of Merit, for services to the community, in the 2003 New Year Honours.

Mary Ogg died in Gore on 6 October 2022, at the age of 77.
