= Results of the 2001 New Zealand territorial authority elections in Northland =

Local elections in New Zealand

2001 New Zealand territorial authority elections (Northland)
- 13 October 2001
- 3 of 3 local councils
Party	Councils	+/–
No majority	3	
This lists parties that won seats. See the complete results below.
- 3 mayors and 33 local councillors
Party	Seats	+/–
Mayors
Independent	3	
Local councillors
Independent	28	
The Proven Team	3	
Community First	1	
Residents and Ratepayers	1	
This lists parties that won seats. See the complete results below.

Elections for the territorial authorities of New Zealand were held from September until 13 October 2001 as part of that year's nation-wide local elections. 865 local councillors and 74 mayors were elected across all 74 councils.

3 territorial authorities were located within the Northland Region. 3 mayors and 33 district councillors were elected.

== Far North District Council ==
2001 Far North District Council election
- 13 October 2001
- Registered: 34,283
- Turnout: 16,479 (48.07%)
- Mayoral election
Candidate	Yvonne Sharp	Carl Maria	Eddie Harrop
Affiliation	Independent	Independent	Independent
Popular vote	12,477	1,691	1,041
Percentage	79.24%	10.74%	6.61%
Mayor before election
Yvonne Sharp
Elected mayor
Yvonne Sharp
Independent
- Council election
- 10 seats on the Far North District Council; 6 seats needed for a majority
Party	Seats	+/–
Independent	6	
The Proven Team	3	
Community First	1	
This lists parties that won seats. See the complete results below.

=== Composition summary ===
Ward	Previous		Elected	
Mayor	?	Yvonne Sharp	Independent	Yvonne Sharp
Eastern	?	missing info	Independent	Pat Booth
Eastern	?	missing info	The Proven Team	Dugald MacDonald
Eastern	?	missing info	The Proven Team	Johnson Davis
Eastern	?	missing info	The Proven Team	Sue Shepherd
Northern	?	missing info	Independent	Fiona King
Northern	?	missing info	Independent	Dennis Bowman
Northern	?	missing info	Independent	Les Robertson
Western	?	missing info	Community First	Laurie Byers
Western	?	missing info	Independent	Joe Carr
Western	?	missing info	Independent	John Laricich
^{R} retired

=== 2001 Far North mayoral election ===
2001 Far North mayoral election
Affiliation	Candidate	Vote	%	+/−
Independent	Yvonne Sharp^{†}	12,477	79.24	?
Independent	Carl Maria	1,691	10.74	?
Independent	Eddie Harrop	1,041	6.61	?
Informal		537	3.41	?
Turnout		15,746	(45.93)	?
Registered		34,283		
Independent hold				
^{†} incumbent

=== Eastern ward ===
Eastern ward
Affiliation	Candidate	Vote	%	+/−
Independent	Pat Booth	3,573	?	?
The Proven Team	Dugald MacDonald	2,573	?	?
The Proven Team	Johnson Davis	2,556	?	?
The Proven Team	Sue Shepherd	2,541	?	?
The Proven Team	Robert Lowe	2,498	?	?
Independent	Ann Court	2,379	?	?
Community First	Derek Ellis	2,351	?	?
Independent	Murray Ferris	1,651	?	?
Independent	Terry Oakley	1,107	?	?
Independent	Michael Butcher	1,090	?	?
Informal		?	?	?
Turnout		?	?	?
Registered		?		
Independent win (Note: Missing information on incumbent affiliation)				
The Proven Team win				
The Proven Team win				
The Proven Team win				

=== Northern ward ===
Northern ward
Affiliation	Candidate	Vote	%	+/−
Independent	Fiona King	3,900	?	?
Independent	Dennis Bowman	3,889	?	?
Independent	Les Robertson	2,968	?	?
Independent	Peter Harrison	1,920	?	?
Informal		?	?	?
Turnout		?	?	?
Registered		?		
Independent win				
Independent win				
Independent win				

=== Western ward ===
Western ward
Affiliation	Candidate	Vote	%	+/−
Community First	Laurie Byers	1,756	?	?
Independent	Joe Carr	1,650	?	?
Independent	John Klaricich	1,558	?	?
Independent	Max Lloydd	1,432	?	?
Independent	John Coleman	1,196	?	?
Independent	Bruce Thorpe	953	?	?
Independent	Rudy Taylor	450	?	?
Independent	Fiona Bannister	419	?	?
Independent	Shaun Reilly	406	?	?
Independent	Geneva Hildreth	319	?	?
Informal		?	?	?
Turnout		?	?	?
Registered		?		
Community First win				
Independent win				
Independent win				

== Whangarei District Council ==
2001 Whangarei District Council election
- 13 October 2001
- Registered: 48,077
- Turnout: 23,965 (49.85%)
- Mayoral election
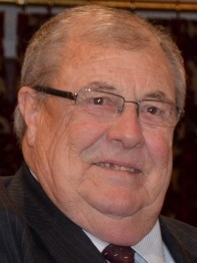

Candidate	Craig Brown	Eddie Harrop	Calvin Green
Affiliation	Independent	Independent	People First
Popular vote	10,169	9,603	3,529
Percentage	42.43%	40.07%	14.73%
Mayor before election
Craig Brown
Elected mayor
Craig Brown
Independent
- Council election
- 13 seats on the Whangarei District Council; 8 seats needed for a majority
Party	Seats	+/–
Independent	13	
This lists parties that won seats. See the complete results below.

=== Composition summary ===
Ward	Previous		Elected	
Mayor	?	Craig Brown	Independent	Craig Brown
Bream Bay	?	Phillip Halse	Independent	Phillip Halse
Bream Bay	?	Neil McLeod	Independent	Neil McLeod
Coastal	?	Robin Lieffering	Independent	Robin Lieffering
Coastal	?	Frits Visser	Independent	Larry Dyer
Denby	?	Crichton Christie	Independent	Crichton Christie
Denby	?	Pamela Peters	Independent	Pamela Peters
Denby	?	Don Sargent	Independent	Kahu Sutherland
Hikurangi	?	Graeme Broughton	Independent	Graeme Broughton
Mangakahia/Maungatapere	?	John Wilson	Independent	John Wilson
Okara	?	Wally Redwood	Independent	Wally Redwood
Okara	?	Isopo Samu	Independent	Isopo Samu
Okara	?	Cherry Hermon	Independent	Don Robertson
Okara	?	Wayne Hill	Independent	Lyanne Kerr
^{R} retired

=== 2001 Whangarei mayoral election ===
2001 Whangarei mayoral election
Affiliation	Candidate	Vote	%	+/−
Independent	Craig Brown^{†}	10,169	42.43	?
Independent	Phil Halse	9,603	40.07	?
People First	Calvin Green	3,529	14.73	?
Informal		644	2.69	?
Turnout		23,965	(49.85)	?
Registered		48,077		
Independent hold				
^{†} incumbent

=== Bream Bay ward ===
Bream Bay ward
Affiliation	Candidate	Vote	%	+/−
Independent	Phillip Halse^{†}	2,234	?	?
Independent	Neil McLeod^{†}	1,764	?	?
Independent	Tom McClelland	1,144	?	?
Informal		103	?	?
Turnout		?	?	?
Registered		?		
Independent win				
Independent win				
^{†} incumbent

=== Coastal ward ===
Coastal ward
Affiliation	Candidate	Vote	%	+/−
Independent	Robin Lieffering^{†}	2,114	?	?
Independent	Larry Dyer	1,812	?	?
People First	Calvin Green	1,097	?	?
Independent	Brian Heape	767	?	?
Informal		88	?	?
Turnout		?	?	?
Registered		?		
Independent win				
Independent win				
^{†} incumbent

=== Denby ward ===
Denby ward
Affiliation	Candidate	Vote	%	+/−
Independent	Crichton Christie^{†}	4,476	?	?
Independent	Pamela Peters^{†}	4,303	?	?
Independent	Kahu Sutherland	3,324	?	?
Independent	Paul Currie	2,091	?	?
People First	Martin Kaipo	1,485	?	?
People First	Alan Palmer	1,283	?	?
Informal		151	?	?
Turnout		?	?	?
Registered		?		
Independent win				
Independent win				
Independent win				
^{†} incumbent

=== Hikurangi ward ===
Hikurangi ward
Affiliation	Candidate	Vote	%	+/−
Independent	Graeme Broughton^{†}	1,159	?	?
People First	Rose Leonard	188	?	?
Independent	Te Raa Nehua	85	?	?
Informal		54	?	?
Turnout		?	?	?
Registered		?		
Independent win				
^{†} incumbent

=== Mangakahia/Maungatapere ward ===
Mangakahia/Maungatapere ward
Affiliation	Candidate	Vote	%	+/−
Independent	John Wilson^{†}	1,321	?	?
Independent	Sharon Kaipo	174	?	?
Informal		62	?	?
Turnout		?	?	?
Registered		?		
Independent win				
^{†} incumbent

=== Okara ward ===
Okara ward
Affiliation	Candidate	Vote	%	+/−
Independent	Wally Redwood^{†}	5,440	?	?
Independent	Isopo Samu^{†}	3,506	?	?
Independent	Don Robertson	3,142	?	?
Independent	Lyanne Kerr	2,893	?	?
Independent	Don McLeod	2,569	?	?
People First	Anna Murphy	2,448	?	?
People First	Terry Burkhardt	1,826	?	?
Independent	Jennifer Leydon	1,774	?	?
People First	Melanie Closs	1,647	?	?
Independent	Don Hedges	1,251	?	?
Informal		226	?	?
Turnout		?	?	?
Registered		?		
Independent win				
Independent win				
Independent win				
Independent win				
^{†} incumbent

== Kaipara District Council ==
2001 Kaipara District Council election
- 13 October 2001
- Registered: 11,961
- Turnout: 5,275 (44.10%)
- Mayoral election
Candidate	Graeme Ramsey
Affiliation	Independent
Popular vote	Unopposed
Mayor before election
Graeme Ramsey
Elected mayor
Graeme Ramsey
Independent
- Council election
- 10 seats on the Kaipara District Council; 6 seats needed for a majority
Party	Seats	+/–
Independent	9	
Residents and Ratepayers	1	
This lists parties that won seats. See the complete results below.

=== Composition summary ===
Ward	Previous		Elected	
Mayor	?	Graeme Ramsey	Independent	Graeme Ramsey
Dargaville	?	missing info	Independent	Derek Watson
Dargaville	?	missing info	Independent	Margaret Bishop
Central	?	missing info	Independent	Neil Tiller
Central	?	missing info	Independent	Richard Alspach
Central	?	missing info	Independent	Peter King
West Coast	?	missing info	Independent	Ian Russell
West Coast	?	missing info	Independent	Jean Bennett
Otamatea	?	missing info	Independent	Graham Taylor
Otamatea	?	missing info	Residents and Ratepayers	Richard Rogan
Otamatea	?	missing info	Independent	Noel Radd
^{R} retired

=== 2001 Kaipara mayoral election ===
2001 Kaipara mayoral election
Affiliation	Candidate	Vote
Independent	Graeme Ramsey^{†}	Unopposed
Registered		?
Independent hold		
^{†} incumbent

=== Dargaville ward ===
Dargaville ward
Affiliation	Candidate	Vote	%	+/−
Independent	Derek Weston	903	?	?
Independent	Margaret Bishop	668	?	?
Independent	Neville Mason	395	?	?
Independent	Ken Berghan	316	?	?
Independent	Alexander Nathan	266	?	?
Independent	Jodie Findlay	260	?	?
Independent	Edward Cook	148	?	?
Independent	Daniel Patuawa	94	?	?
Informal		4	?	?
Turnout		?	?	?
Registered		?		
Independent win				
Independent win				

=== Central ward ===
Central ward
Affiliation	Candidate	Vote
Independent	Neil Tiller	Unopposed
Independent	Richard Alspach	Unopposed
Independent	Peter King	Unopposed
Registered		?
Independent win		
Independent win		
Independent win		

=== West Coast ward ===
West Coast ward
Affiliation	Candidate	Vote	%	+/−
Independent	Ian Russell	859	?	?
Independent	Jean Bennett	678	?	?
Independent	Bill Guest	427	?	?
Independent	Joan Te Waiti	217	?	?
Independent	Gary Hooker	146	?	?
Independent	Christopher Willy	130	?	?
Informal		0	?	?
Turnout		?	?	?
Registered		?		
Independent win				
Independent win				

=== Otamatea ward ===
Otamatea ward
Affiliation	Candidate	Vote	%	+/−
Independent	Graham Taylor	1,072	?	?
Residents and Ratepayers	Richard Rogan	1,006	?	?
Independent	Noel Radd	990	?	?
Independent	Christine Yardley	958	?	?
Independent	Deborah Duncan	374	?	?
Independent	Paul Shepherd	357	?	?
Independent	Leatrice Welsh	242	?	?
Independent	Hazel Kaio	212	?	?
Informal		4	?	?
Turnout		?	?	?
Registered		?		
Independent win				
Residents and Ratepayers win				
Independent win				

== See also ==
- 2001 Northland Regional Council election
