= Results of the 2001 New Zealand regional council elections =

Election in New Zealand

2001 New Zealand regional council elections
- 13 October 2001
- 12 regional councils
| Party | Councils | +/– |
|---|---|---|
| No majority | 12 | |
This lists parties that won seats. See the complete results below.
- 134 regional councillors
| Party | Seats | +/– |
|---|---|---|
| Independent | 117 | |
| Christchurch 2021 | 6 | |
| Citizens and Ratepayers | 3 | |
| Advancing Auckland | 2 | |
| Team West | 2 | |
| Independent Citizens | 1 | |
| Hutt 2020 | 1 | |
| Terris' Team | 1 | |
| Hamilton First | 1 | |
This lists parties that won seats. See the complete results below.

Elections for the regional councils of New Zealand were held from September to 13 October 2001 as part of that year's nation-wide local elections. 134 regional councillors were elected across all 12 regions.

== Summary ==
=== Overall ===
| Council | Electoral system | Seats | Chair | Councillors | Control | Turnout | Details | Refs |
|---|---|---|---|---|---|---|---|---|
| Northland | FPP | 8 | missing info | ▌ Independent 8 | ▌ No majority | 42,081; 44.61% ? pp | Details | |
| Auckland | FPP | 13 | missing info | ▌ Independent 6 ▌ C&R 3 ▌ Advancing Auckland 2 ▌ Team West 2 | ▌ No majority | 340,999; 43.35% ? pp | Details | |
| Waikato | FPP | 14 | missing info | ▌ Independent 13 ▌ Hamilton First 1 | ▌ No majority | 98,613; 49% ? pp | Details | |
| Bay of Plenty | FPP | 12 | missing info | ▌ Independent 12 | ▌ No majority | 71,011; 52% ? pp | Details | |
| Hawke's Bay | FPP | 9 | missing info | ▌ Independent 9 | ▌ No majority | 48,730; 55% ? pp | Details | |
| Taranaki | FPP | 10 | missing info | ▌ Independent 10 | ▌ No majority | 32,136; 61% ? pp | Details | |
| Manawatu-Wanganui | FPP | 11 | missing info | ▌ Independent 11 | ▌ No majority | 42,678; 53% ? pp | Details | |
| Wellington | FPP | 13 | missing info | ▌ Independent 11 ▌ Hutt 2020 1 ▌ Terris' Team 1 | ▌ No majority | 119,467; 50% ? pp | Details | |
| West Coast | FPP | 6 | missing info | ▌ Independent 6 | ▌ No majority | 17,858; 78.55% ? pp | Details | |
| Canterbury | FPP | 14 | missing info | ▌ Independent 7 ▌ Christchurch 2021 6 ▌ Independent Citizens 1 | ▌ No majority | 168,228; 52% ? pp | Details | |
| Otago | FPP | 12 | missing info | ▌ Independent 12 | ▌ No majority | 81,383; 60.64% ? pp | Details | |
| Southland | FPP | 12 | missing info | ▌ Independent 12 | ▌ No majority | 34,840; 59% ? pp | Details | |
| 12 of 12 councils | | 134 | | | | | | |

== Northland Regional Council ==
2001 Northland Regional Council election
- 13 October 2001
- Registered: 94,321
- Turnout: 42,081 (44.61%)
- 8 seats on the Northland Regional Council; 5 seats needed for a majority
| Party | Seats | +/– |
|---|---|---|
| Independent | 8 | 0 |
This lists parties that won seats. See the complete results below.

=== Far North constituency ===
Far North constituency
| Affiliation | Candidate | Votes | % | +/− |
|---|---|---|---|---|
| Independent | Jim Peters^{†} | 8,747 | ? | ? |
| Independent | Lorraine Hill^{†} | 8,126 | ? | ? |
| Independent | Ian Walker | 8,083 | ? | ? |
| Independent | Robin Shepherd^{†} | 7,970 | ? | ? |
| Independent | Maurice Penney | 4,618 | ? | ? |
| Informal | | 0 | 0.00 | ? |
| Turnout | | ? | ? | ? |
| Registered | | 34,283 | | |
| Independent win (Note: Missing information on incumbent affiliation) | | | | |
| Independent win | | | | |
| Independent win | | | | |
^{†} incumbent

=== Whangarei constituency ===
Whangarei constituency
| Affiliation | Candidate | Votes | % | +/− |
|---|---|---|---|---|
| Independent | Stan Semenoff | 13,618 | ? | ? |
| Independent | Peter Jensen^{†} | 12,952 | ? | ? |
| Independent | Bill Rossiter^{†} | 12,015 | ? | ? |
| Independent | Rod McKay^{†} | 11,034 | ? | ? |
| Independent | Laurie Ackers | 10,162 | ? | ? |
| Independent | Ann Shaw | 9,647 | ? | ? |
| People First | Derek Keene | 6,169 | ? | ? |
| People First | Moea Armstrong | 3,983 | ? | ? |
| Independent | Gray Phillips | 2,716 | ? | ? |
| Informal | | 524 | ? | ? |
| Turnout | | ? | ? | ? |
| Registered | | 48,077 | | |
| Independent win | | | | |
| Independent win | | | | |
| Independent win | | | | |
| Independent win | | | | |
^{†} incumbent

=== Kaipara constituency ===
Kaipara constituency
| Affiliation | Candidate | Votes | % | +/− |
|---|---|---|---|---|
| Independent | Mark Farnsworth^{†} | 2,835 | 50.00 | ? |
| Independent | David Underwood | 2,168 | 38.24 | ? |
| Independent | Adrian Bonner | 660 | 11.64 | ? |
| Informal | | 7 | 0.12 | ? |
| Turnout | | 5,670 | (47.41) | ? |
| Registered | | 11,961 | | |
| Independent win | | | | |
^{†} incumbent

== Auckland Regional Council ==
2001 Auckland Regional Council election
- 13 October 2001
- Registered: 786,601
- Turnout: 340,999 (43.35%)
- 13 seats on the Auckland Regional Council; 7 seats needed for a majority
| Party | Seats | +/– |
|---|---|---|
| Independent | 6 | |
| Citizens and Ratepayers | 3 | |
| Advancing Auckland | 2 | |
| Team West | 2 | |
This lists parties that won seats. See the complete results below.

=== Auckland constituency ===
Auckland constituency
| Affiliation | Candidate | Votes | % | +/− |
|---|---|---|---|---|
| Citizens and Ratepayers | Phil Warren^{†} | 43,147 | ? | ? |
| Citizens and Ratepayers | Judith Bassett | 36,216 | ? | ? |
| Citizens and Ratepayers | Catherine Harland | 33,453 | ? | ? |
| Advancing Auckland | Michael Barnett | 30,423 | ? | ? |
| Citizens and Ratepayers | Ron Greer | 29,015 | ? | ? |
| City Vision | Mike Lee^{†} | 28,220 | ? | ? |
| City Vision | Jill Amos | 27,987 | ? | ? |
| City Vision | Jack Henderson^{†} | 25,218 | ? | ? |
| City Vision | John Hill | 20,192 | ? | ? |
| Independent | Peter Boys | 16,324 | ? | ? |
| Independent | David Willmott | 16,162 | ? | ? |
| Advancing Auckland | Rodney Dearing | 16,137 | ? | ? |
| Independent | Gilbert Myles | 13,802 | ? | ? |
| Independent | Don Fairley | 12,734 | ? | ? |
| Independent | Harry Palmer | 7,487 | ? | ? |
| Informal | | 615 | ? | ? |
| Turnout | | ? | ? | ? |
| Registered | | 253,681 | | |
| Citizens and Ratepayers win | | | | |
| Citizens and Ratepayers win | | | | |
| Citizens and Ratepayers win | | | | |
| Advancing Auckland win | | | | |
^{†} incumbent

=== Franklin-Papakura constituency ===
Franklin-Papakura constituency
| Affiliation | Candidate | Votes | % | +/− |
|---|---|---|---|---|
| Independent | Dianne Glenn^{†} | 9,023 | 42.27 | ? |
| Independent | Allan Bell | 7,832 | 36.69 | ? |
| Alliance | Alex Muir | 4,431 | 20.76 | ? |
| Informal | | 62 | 0.29 | ? |
| Turnout | | 21,348 | ? | ? |
| Registered | | ? | | |
| Independent win | | | | |
^{†} incumbent

=== Manukau constituency ===
Manukau constituency
| Affiliation | Candidate | Votes | % | +/− |
|---|---|---|---|---|
| Advancing Auckland | Craig Little | 25,031 | ? | ? |
| Independent | Bill Burrill^{†} | 24,992 | ? | ? |
| Independent | Gwen Bull^{†} | 24,246 | ? | ? |
| Independent | Colin Adams | 19,556 | ? | ? |
| Independent | Alistaire Hall | 15,218 | ? | ? |
| Alliance | Susi Williams | 13,772 | ? | ? |
| Alliance | Meng Ly | 12,501 | ? | ? |
| Independent | Dene Andre | 8,793 | ? | ? |
| Independent | Niranjan Grewal | 2,188 | ? | ? |
| Alliance | Rosie Brown | 1,651 | ? | ? |
| Informal | | 4,608 | ? | ? |
| Turnout | | ? | ? | ? |
| Registered | | 179,563 | | |
| Advancing Auckland win | | | | |
| Independent win | | | | |
| Independent win | | | | |
^{†} incumbent

=== North Shore constituency ===
North Shore constituency
| Affiliation | Candidate | Votes | % | +/− |
|---|---|---|---|---|
| Independent | Philip Sherry^{†} | 15,922 | ? | ? |
| Independent | Ian Bradley | 11,912 | ? | ? |
| Independent | Ross Finlayson | 9,323 | ? | ? |
| Independent | Ian Revell | 8,496 | ? | ? |
| Independent | Paddy Stafford-Bush | 8,477 | ? | ? |
| Your Views Matter | Ruth Norman^{†} | 7,430 | ? | ? |
| Alliance | Jill Henry | 7,115 | ? | ? |
| A New Team | Gordon Duncan | 5,328 | ? | ? |
| Alliance | Peter Kane | 5,221 | ? | ? |
| Independent | Andrew Jones | 4,442 | ? | ? |
| A New Team | Eugenie Laracy | 4,309 | ? | ? |
| Informal | | 3,258 | ? | ? |
| Turnout | | ? | ? | ? |
| Registered | | 130,758 | | |
| Independent win | | | | |
| Independent win | | | | |
^{†} incumbent

=== Rodney constituency ===
Rodney constituency
| Affiliation | Candidate | Votes | % | +/− |
|---|---|---|---|---|
| Independent | Brian Smith^{†} | 9,749 | 55.14 | ? |
| Your Views Matter | Leanne Smith | 3,082 | 17.43 | ? |
| Independent | Kate Leslie | 2,789 | 15.77 | ? |
| Independent | John Fistonich | 2,041 | 11.54 | ? |
| Informal | | 21 | 0.12 | ? |
| Turnout | | 17,682 | ? | ? |
| Registered | | ? | | |
| Independent win | | | | |
^{†} incumbent

=== Waitakere constituency ===
Waitakere constituency
| Affiliation | Candidate | Votes | % | +/− |
|---|---|---|---|---|
| Team West | Sandra Coney | 20,666 | ? | ? |
| Team West | Paul Walbran | 17,872 | ? | ? |
| missing info | Jenny Price | 10,549 | ? | ? |
| Go Waitakere | Carl Harding^{†} | 9,946 | ? | ? |
| Alliance | Sally Griffin | 5,535 | ? | ? |
| Go Waitakere | Brendon Lane | 4,627 | ? | ? |
| Independent | Laurence Boomert | 4,468 | ? | ? |
| Informal | | ? | ? | ? |
| Turnout | | ? | ? | ? |
| Registered | | 109,450 | | |
| Team West win | | | | |
| Team West win | | | | |
^{†} incumbent

== Waikato Regional Council ==
2001 Waikato Regional Council election
- 13 October 2001
- Turnout: 98,613 (49%) (Note: Across contested constituencies.)
- 14 seats on the Waikato Regional Council; 8 seats needed for a majority
| Party | Seats | +/– |
|---|---|---|
| Independent | 13 | |
| Hamilton First | 1 | |
This lists parties that won seats. See the complete results below.

=== Central Waikato constituency ===
Central Waikato constituency
| Affiliation | Candidate | Votes | % | +/− |
|---|---|---|---|---|
| Independent | Jenni Vernon | ? | ? | ? |
| Independent | Ross Meurant | ? | ? | ? |
| Independent | Shange Solomon | ? | ? | ? |
| Informal | | ? | ? | ? |
| Turnout | | ? | ? | ? |
| Registered | | ? | | |
| Independent win | | | | |

=== Hamilton constituency ===
Hamilton constituency
| Affiliation | Candidate | Votes | % | +/− |
|---|---|---|---|---|
| Independent | Lois Livingston | ? | ? | ? |
| Hamilton First | Angus Macdonald | ? | ? | ? |
| Independent | David Peart | ? | ? | ? |
| Independent | Paula Southgate | ? | ? | ? |
| Independent | Jacqui Amohanga | ? | ? | ? |
| Independent | Robin Foster | ? | ? | ? |
| Independent | Dan Harris | ? | ? | ? |
| Independent | Steve Hills | ? | ? | ? |
| Independent | Maureen McCool | ? | ? | ? |
| Independent | Arthur Muldoon | ? | ? | ? |
| Independent | Darryl Smith | ? | ? | ? |
| Independent | Barry Striling | ? | ? | ? |
| Independent | Terry Strokes | ? | ? | ? |
| Informal | | ? | ? | ? |
| Turnout | | ? | ? | ? |
| Registered | | 78,674 | | |
| Independent win | | | | |
| Hamilton First win | | | | |
| Independent win | | | | |
| Independent win | | | | |

=== Hauraki constituency ===
Hauraki constituency
| Affiliation | Candidate | Votes |
|---|---|---|
| Independent | Neil Clarke | Unopposed |
| Registered | | 11,857 |
| Independent win | | |

=== Matamata-Piako constituency ===
Matamata-Piako constituency
| Affiliation | Candidate | Votes | % | +/− |
|---|---|---|---|---|
| Independent | Steve Osborne | ? | ? | ? |
| Independent | Bill Cox | ? | ? | ? |
| Independent | Rodney Luxton | ? | ? | ? |
| Informal | | ? | ? | ? |
| Turnout | | ? | ? | ? |
| Registered | | 20,230 | | |
| Independent win | | | | |

=== North King Country constituency ===
North King Country constituency
| Affiliation | Candidate | Votes |
|---|---|---|
| Independent | Andra Neely | Unopposed |
| Registered | | ? |
| Independent win | | |

=== North Waikato constituency ===
North Waikato constituency
| Affiliation | Candidate | Votes | % | +/− |
|---|---|---|---|---|
| Independent | Jeanette Thomas | ? | ? | ? |
| Independent | Carmen Kirkwood | ? | ? | ? |
| Informal | | ? | ? | ? |
| Turnout | | ? | ? | ? |
| Registered | | ? | | |
| Independent win | | | | |

=== South Waikato constituency ===
South Waikato constituency
| Affiliation | Candidate | Votes | % | +/− |
|---|---|---|---|---|
| Independent | Jim Howland | ? | ? | ? |
| Independent | Laurence Ryder | ? | ? | ? |
| Informal | | ? | ? | ? |
| Turnout | | ? | ? | ? |
| Registered | | ? | | |
| Independent win | | | | |

=== Taupo constituency ===
Taupo constituency
| Affiliation | Candidate | Votes | % | +/− |
|---|---|---|---|---|
| Independent | Laurie Burdett | ? | ? | ? |
| Independent | Helen Lane | ? | ? | ? |
| Independent | John Davis | ? | ? | ? |
| Independent | Celia Pope | ? | ? | ? |
| Independent | Makere Rangitoheriri | ? | ? | ? |
| Independent | Wiari Rauhina | ? | ? | ? |
| Informal | | ? | ? | ? |
| Turnout | | ? | ? | ? |
| Registered | | ? | | |
| Independent win | | | | |
| Independent win | | | | |

=== Thames-Coromandel constituency ===
Thames-Coromandel constituency
| Affiliation | Candidate | Votes |
|---|---|---|
| Independent | Evan Penny | Unopposed |
| Registered | | 20,141 |
| Independent win | | |

=== Waipa constituency ===
Waipa constituency
| Affiliation | Candidate | Votes | % | +/− |
|---|---|---|---|---|
| Independent | Barry O'Connor | ? | ? | ? |
| Independent | Bruce Milne | ? | ? | ? |
| Informal | | ? | ? | ? |
| Turnout | | ? | ? | ? |
| Registered | | 27,556 | | |
| Independent win | | | | |

== Bay of Plenty Regional Council ==
2001 Bay of Plenty Regional Council election
- 13 October 2001
- Turnout: 71,011 (52%)
- 12 seats on Bay of Plenty Regional Council; 7 seats needed for a majority
| Party | Seats | +/– |
|---|---|---|
| Independent | 12 | |
This lists parties that won seats. See the complete results below.

=== Eastern Bay constituency ===
Eastern Bay constituency
| Affiliation | Candidate | Votes | % | +/− |
|---|---|---|---|---|
| Independent | Lorraine Brill^{†} | ? | ? | ? |
| Independent | Bryan Riesterer^{†} | ? | ? | ? |
| Independent | Malcolm Whitaker | ? | ? | ? |
| Independent | Paddy Briscoe | ? | ? | ? |
| Independent | Materoa Dodd | ? | ? | ? |
| Independent | Phillip Hohapata | ? | ? | ? |
| Informal | | ? | ? | ? |
| Turnout | | ? | ? | ? |
| Registered | | ? | | |
| Independent win | | | | |
| Independent win | | | | |
| Independent win | | | | |
^{†} incumbent

=== Rotorua constituency ===
Rotorua constituency
| Affiliation | Candidate | Votes | % | +/− |
|---|---|---|---|---|
| Independent | Bill Cleghorn | ? | ? | ? |
| Independent | Robin Ford | ? | ? | ? |
| Independent | Rosemary Michie^{†} | ? | ? | ? |
| Independent | Tai Eru^{†} | ? | ? | ? |
| Independent | Peri Ngata | ? | ? | ? |
| Informal | | ? | ? | ? |
| Turnout | | ? | ? | ? |
| Registered | | ? | | |
| Independent win | | | | |
| Independent win | | | | |
| Independent win | | | | |
^{†} incumbent

=== Tauranga constituency ===
Tauranga constituency
| Affiliation | Candidate | Votes | % | +/− |
|---|---|---|---|---|
| Independent | John Cronin^{†} | ? | ? | ? |
| Independent | Elinor Elder | ? | ? | ? |
| Independent | Athole Herbert^{†} | ? | ? | ? |
| Independent | Karen Summerhays | ? | ? | ? |
| Independent | Rod Ade | ? | ? | ? |
| Independent | Noel Pope | ? | ? | ? |
| Informal | | ? | ? | ? |
| Turnout | | ? | ? | ? |
| Registered | | ? | | |
| Independent win | | | | |
| Independent win | | | | |
| Independent win | | | | |
| Independent win (new seat) | | | | |
^{†} incumbent

=== Western Bay constituency ===
Western Bay constituency
| Affiliation | Candidate | Votes |
|---|---|---|
| Independent | Ian Noble^{†} | Unopposed |
| Independent | James Pringle^{†} | Unopposed |
| Registered | | ? |
| Independent win | | |
| Independent win | | |
^{†} incumbent

== Hawke's Bay Regional Council ==
2001 Hawke's Bay Regional Council election
- 13 October 2001
- Turnout: 48,730 (55%)
- 9 seats on the Hawke's Bay Regional Council; 5 seats needed for a majority
| Party | Seats | +/– |
|---|---|---|
| Independent | 9 | |
This lists parties that won seats. See the complete results below.

=== Napier constituency ===
Napier constituency
| Affiliation | Candidate | Votes | % | +/− |
|---|---|---|---|---|
| Independent | Allan Baldock^{†} | ? | ? | ? |
| Independent | Neil Kirton | ? | ? | ? |
| Independent | Christine Scott | ? | ? | ? |
| Independent | Murray Bond | ? | ? | ? |
| Independent | Beverley Fullerton-Smith^{†} | ? | ? | ? |
| Independent | Mike Healy | ? | ? | ? |
| Informal | | ? | ? | ? |
| Turnout | | ? | ? | ? |
| Registered | | 38,419 | | |
| Independent win | | | | |
| Independent win | | | | |
| Independent win | | | | |
^{†} incumbent

=== Hastings constituency ===
Hastings constituency
| Affiliation | Candidate | Votes | % | +/− |
|---|---|---|---|---|
| Independent | Jeremy Dwyer | ? | ? | ? |
| Independent | Kevin Rose^{†} | ? | ? | ? |
| Independent | Eileen von Dadelszen^{†} | ? | ? | ? |
| Independent | Ann Dixon | ? | ? | ? |
| Independent | Ewan McGregor | ? | ? | ? |
| Independent | Sam Averill | ? | ? | ? |
| Informal | | ? | ? | ? |
| Turnout | | ? | ? | ? |
| Registered | | ? | | |
| Independent win | | | | |
| Independent win | | | | |
| Independent win | | | | |
^{†} incumbent

=== Ngaruroro constituency ===
Ngaruroro constituency
| Affiliation | Candidate | Votes |
|---|---|---|
| Independent | Ross Bramwell^{†} | Unopposed |
| Registered | | ? |
| Independent win | | |
^{†} incumbent

=== Wairoa constituency ===
Wairoa constituency
| Affiliation | Candidate | Votes |
|---|---|---|
| Independent | Rex McIntyre^{†} | Unopposed |
| Registered | | 5,698 |
| Independent win | | |
^{†} incumbent

=== Central Hawke's Bay constituency ===
Central Hawke's Bay constituency
| Affiliation | Candidate | Votes |
|---|---|---|
| Independent | Adrienne Williams^{†} | Unopposed |
| Registered | | 8,582 |
| Independent win | | |
^{†} incumbent

== Taranaki Regional Council ==
2001 Taranaki Regional Council election
- 13 October 2001
- Turnout: 32,136 (61%)
- 10 seats on the Taranaki Regional Council; 6 seats needed for a majority
| Party | Seats | +/– |
|---|---|---|
| Independent | 10 | |
This lists parties that won seats. See the complete results below.

=== New Plymouth constituency ===
New Plymouth constituency
| Affiliation | Candidate | Votes | % | +/− |
|---|---|---|---|---|
| Independent | Claire Stewart | 13,589 | ? | ? |
| Independent | Barry Marsh^{†} | 8,309 | ? | ? |
| Independent | David Lean^{†} | 7,814 | ? | ? |
| Independent | Tom Cloke | 7,542 | ? | ? |
| Independent | Bob Maxwell | 5,836 | ? | ? |
| Independent | Caroline Ball | 5,070 | ? | ? |
| Independent | Kevin Phillips | 4,905 | ? | ? |
| Independent | Wayne Bennett | 3,958 | ? | ? |
| Independent | Joan Gaines | 3,499 | ? | ? |
| Independent | Merv Martin | 3,393 | ? | ? |
| Independent | Yarn Reprerus | 1,000 | ? | ? |
| Informal | | ? | ? | ? |
| Turnout | | ? | ? | ? |
| Registered | | ? | | |
| Independent win | | | | |
| Independent win | | | | |
| Independent win | | | | |
| Independent win | | | | |
^{†} incumbent

=== North Taranaki constituency ===
North Taranaki constituency
| Affiliation | Candidate | Votes |
|---|---|---|
| Independent | Roger Maxwell^{†} | Unopposed |
| Independent | Donald McIntyre^{†} | Unopposed |
| Registered | | ? |
| Independent win | | |
| Independent win | | |
^{†} incumbent

=== Stratford constituency ===
Stratford constituency
| Affiliation | Candidate | Votes |
|---|---|---|
| Independent | David Walter^{†} | Unopposed |
| Registered | | ? |
| Independent win | | |
^{†} incumbent

=== South Taranaki constituency ===
South Taranaki constituency
| Affiliation | Candidate | Votes | % | +/− |
|---|---|---|---|---|
| Independent | Neil Walker^{†} | 7,375 | ? | ? |
| Independent | David MacLeod^{†} | 7,268 | ? | ? |
| Independent | Ian Armstrong | 7,031 | ? | ? |
| Independent | Alan Murray | 5,052 | ? | ? |
| Informal | | ? | ? | ? |
| Turnout | | ? | ? | ? |
| Registered | | 18,459 | | |
| Independent win | | | | |
| Independent win | | | | |
| Independent win | | | | |
^{†} incumbent

== Manawatu-Wanganui Regional Council ==
2001 Manawatu-Wanganui Regional Council election
- 13 October 2001
- Turnout: 42,678 (53%)
- 11 seats on the Manawatu-Wanganui Regional Council; 6 seats needed for a majority
| Party | Seats | +/– |
|---|---|---|
| Independent | 11 | |
This lists parties that won seats. See the complete results below.

=== Horowhenua constituency ===
Horowhenua constituency
| Affiliation | Candidate | Votes | % | +/− |
|---|---|---|---|---|
| Independent | Malcolm Guy | 7,238 | 77.91 | ? |
| Independent | Billy McKee | 1,338 | 14.40 | ? |
| Informal | | 714 | 7.69 | ? |
| Turnout | | 9,290 | ? | ? |
| Registered | | ? | | |
| Independent win | | | | |

=== Manawatu constituency ===
Manawatu constituency
| Affiliation | Candidate | Votes | % | +/− |
|---|---|---|---|---|
| Independent | David Meads | 6,605 | 83.88 | ? |
| Independent | Stephen Bray | 717 | 9.11 | ? |
| Informal | | 552 | 7.01 | ? |
| Turnout | | 7,874 | ? | ? |
| Registered | | ? | | |
| Independent win | | | | |

=== Palmerston North constituency ===
Palmerston North constituency
| Affiliation | Candidate | Votes | % | +/− |
|---|---|---|---|---|
| Independent | Paul Rieger | 13,482 | ? | ? |
| Independent | Roni Fitzmaurice | 9,514 | ? | ? |
| Independent | Vern Chettleburgh | 9,185 | ? | ? |
| Independent | Tom Shannon | 7,235 | ? | ? |
| Independent | Peter Stephens | 7,008 | ? | ? |
| Independent | Jan Dixon | 6,786 | ? | ? |
| Green | Garry Buckman | 4,896 | ? | ? |
| Independent | Eithne Hanley | 4,623 | ? | ? |
| Informal | | 1,525 | ? | ? |
| Turnout | | ? | ? | ? |
| Registered | | ? | | |
| Independent win | | | | |
| Independent win | | | | |
| Independent win | | | | |

=== Ruapehu constituency ===
Ruapehu constituency
| Affiliation | Candidate | Votes |
|---|---|---|
| Independent | Chris Lester | Unopposed |
| Registered | | ? |
| Independent win | | |

=== Rangitikei constituency ===
Rangitikei constituency
| Affiliation | Candidate | Votes |
|---|---|---|
| Independent | Andy Guy | Unopposed |
| Registered | | ? |
| Independent win | | |

=== Wanganui constituency ===
Wanganui constituency
| Affiliation | Candidate | Votes |
|---|---|---|
| Independent | John Blaikie | Unopposed |
| Independent | Annette Main | Unopposed |
| Registered | | ? |
| Independent win | | |
| Independent win | | |

=== Tararua constituency ===
Tararua constituency
| Affiliation | Candidate | Votes |
|---|---|---|
| Independent | Garry Murfitt | Unopposed |
| Registered | | ? |
| Independent win | | |

=== Kere Kere-Kairanga constituency ===
Kere Kere-Kairanga constituency
| Affiliation | Candidate | Votes |
|---|---|---|
| Independent | Howard Voss | Unopposed |
| Registered | | ? |
| Independent win | | |

== Wellington Regional Council ==
2001 Wellington Regional Council election
- 13 October 2001
- Turnout: 119,467 (50%)
- 13 seats on the Wellington Regional Council; 7 seats needed for a majority
| Party | Seats | +/– |
|---|---|---|
| Independent | 11 | |
| Hutt 2020 | 1 | |
| Terris' Team | 1 | |
This lists parties that won seats. See the complete results below.

=== Kapiti constituency ===
Kapiti constituency
| Affiliation | Candidate | Votes |
|---|---|---|
| Independent | Chris Turver^{†} | Unopposed |
| Registered | | ? |
| Independent win | | |
^{†} incumbent

=== Porirua constituency ===
Porirua constituency
| Affiliation | Candidate | Votes |
|---|---|---|
| Independent | Margaret Shields^{†} | Unopposed |
| Registered | | ? |
| Independent win | | |
^{†} incumbent

=== Upper Hutt constituency ===
Upper Hutt constituency
| Affiliation | Candidate | Votes | % | +/− |
|---|---|---|---|---|
| Independent | Rex Kirton | 4,604 | ~32.79 | ? |
| Independent | Bryan Jackson | 4,552 | ~32.42 | ? |
| Independent | Bob Lendrum | 2,928 | ~20.86 | ? |
| Independent | Jeff Berkett | 1,955 | ~13.93 | ? |
| Informal | | ? | ? | ? |
| Turnout | | >14,039 | ? | ? |
| Registered | | ? | | |
| Independent win | | | | |

=== Lower Hutt constituency ===
Lower Hutt constituency
| Affiliation | Candidate | Votes | % | +/− |
|---|---|---|---|---|
| Hutt 2020 | Dick Werry^{†} | 10,165 | ? | ? |
| Independent | Glen Evans | 9,720 | ? | ? |
| Terris' Team | Rosemarie Thomas^{†} | 9,495 | ? | ? |
| Hutt 2020 | Peter Glenson | 8,749 | ? | ? |
| Terris' Team | David Ogden | 8,435 | ? | ? |
| Hutt 2020 | Fred Allen | 7,894 | ? | ? |
| Independent | Sandra Greig | 7,309 | ? | ? |
| Independent | Jill Berridge | 6,670 | ? | ? |
| Independent | Jim Allen^{†} | 5,048 | ? | ? |
| Independent | Gordon George | 3,685 | ? | ? |
| Independent | Robert Moncrieff | 595 | ? | ? |
| Informal | | ? | ? | ? |
| Turnout | | ? | ? | ? |
| Registered | | ? | | |
| Hutt 2020 win | | | | |
| Independent win | | | | |
| Terris' Team win | | | | |
^{†} incumbent

=== Wellington constituency ===
Wellington constituency
| Affiliation | Candidate | Votes | % | +/− |
|---|---|---|---|---|
| Independent | Chris Laidlaw^{†} | 31,361 | ? | ? |
| Independent | Hugh Barr | 22,829 | ? | ? |
| Independent | Judith Aitken | 22,162 | ? | ? |
| Independent | Terry McDavitt^{†} | 20,926 | ? | ? |
| Independent | Irvine Yardley | 20,497 | ? | ? |
| Independent | Mike Gibson^{†} | 15,201 | ? | ? |
| Labour | Robin Boldarin | 14,214 | ? | ? |
| Labour | Kevin Burrows | 13,419 | ? | ? |
| Independent | Martyn Turner | 12,719 | ? | ? |
| Independent | Paul Bruce | 10,782 | ? | ? |
| Independent | Derek Milne | 7,564 | ? | ? |
| Alliance | Russell Taylor | 7,502 | ? | ? |
| Independent | Rosamund Averton | 5,932 | ? | ? |
| Independent | Steve Cardno | 5,256 | ? | ? |
| Independent | Al McWhinnie | 4,678 | ? | ? |
| Independent | Vince Terreni | 3,740 | ? | ? |
| Independent | Ivan Brody-Solt | 2,966 | ? | ? |
| Informal | | ? | ? | ? |
| Turnout | | ? | ? | ? |
| Registered | | ? | | |
| Independent win | | | | |
| Independent win | | | | |
| Independent win | | | | |
| Independent win | | | | |
| Independent win | | | | |
^{†} incumbent

=== Wairarapa constituency ===
Wairarapa constituency
| Affiliation | Candidate | Votes | % | +/− |
|---|---|---|---|---|
| Independent | Rick Long^{†} | 10,209 | ? | ? |
| Independent | Ian Buchanan^{†} | 10,081 | ? | ? |
| Independent | Ron Southey | 6,593 | ? | ? |
| Independent | Ian Macfarlane | 3,347 | ? | ? |
| Informal | | ? | ? | ? |
| Turnout | | ? | ? | ? |
| Registered | | ? | | |
| Independent win | | | | |
| Independent win | | | | |
^{†} incumbent

== West Coast Regional Council ==
2001 West Coast Regional Council election
- 13 October 2001
- Registered: 22,735
- Turnout: 17,858 (78.55%)
- 6 seats on the West Coast Regional Council; 4 seats needed for a majority
| Party | Seats | +/– |
|---|---|---|
| Independent | 6 | |
This lists parties that won seats. See the complete results below.

=== Buller constituency ===
Buller constituency
| Affiliation | Candidate | Votes | % | +/− |
|---|---|---|---|---|
| Independent | John Clayton^{†} | ? | ? | ? |
| Independent | Ross Scarlet^{†} | ? | ? | ? |
| Independent | ? | ? | ? | ? |
| Independent | ? | ? | ? | ? |
| Informal | | ? | ? | ? |
| Turnout | | ? | ? | ? |
| Registered | | ? | | |
| Independent win | | | | |
| Independent win | | | | |
^{†} incumbent

=== Grey constituency ===
Grey constituency
| Affiliation | Candidate | Votes | % | +/− |
|---|---|---|---|---|
| Independent | Peter Ewan | 3,536 | ? | ? |
| Independent | Dennis Shanahan | 2,768 | ? | ? |
| Independent | Peter Moreton | 2,525 | ? | ? |
| Independent | John Foster^{†} | 1,807 | ? | ? |
| Informal | | 328 | ? | ? |
| Turnout | | ? | ? | ? |
| Registered | | ? | | |
| Independent win | | | | |
| Independent win | | | | |
^{†} incumbent

=== Westland constituency ===
Westland constituency
| Affiliation | Candidate | Votes | % | +/− |
|---|---|---|---|---|
| Independent | Duncan Davidson^{†} | 2,561 | ? | ? |
| Independent | John Wood | 2,353 | ? | ? |
| Independent | Barbara Duckett^{†} | 1,426 | ? | ? |
| Informal | | 308 | ? | ? |
| Turnout | | ? | ? | ? |
| Registered | | ? | | |
| Independent win | | | | |
| Independent win | | | | |
^{†} incumbent

== Canterbury Regional Council ==
2001 Canterbury Regional Council election
- 13 October 2001
- Turnout: 168,228 (52%)
- 14 seats on the Canterbury Regional Council; 8 seats needed for a majority
| Party | Seats | +/– |
|---|---|---|
| Independent | 7 | |
| Christchurch 2021 | 6 | |
| Independent Citizens | 1 | |
This lists parties that won seats. See the complete results below.

=== North Canterbury constituency ===
North Canterbury constituency
| Affiliation | Candidate | Votes | % | +/− |
|---|---|---|---|---|
| Independent | Ross Little | 15,526 | ? | ? |
| Independent | Robert Johnston | 14,464 | ? | ? |
| missing info | Drucilla Kingi-Patterson | 3,839 | ? | ? |
| missing info | John Ropata-Roberts | 1,928 | ? | ? |
| Informal | | 1,617 | ? | ? |
| Turnout | | ? | ? | ? |
| Registered | | ? | | |
| Independent win | | | | |
| Independent win | | | | |

=== Christchurch North constituency ===
Christchurch North constituency
| Affiliation | Candidate | Votes | % | +/− |
|---|---|---|---|---|
| Independent | Ian Robertson | 13,134 | ? | ? |
| Christchurch 2021 | Judy Waters | 10,050 | ? | ? |
| Green / Christchurch 2021 | Rex Verity | 6,875 | ? | ? |
| Independent | Tony Wills | 6,427 | ? | ? |
| Independent Citizens | Jeremy O'Dowd | 6,029 | ? | ? |
| Independent Citizens | Terry Wilkinson | 4,271 | ? | ? |
| Informal | | 4,220 | ? | ? |
| Turnout | | ? | ? | ? |
| Registered | | ? | | |
| Independent win | | | | |
| Christchurch 2021 win | | | | |

=== Christchurch East constituency ===
Christchurch East constituency
| Affiliation | Candidate | Votes | % | +/− |
|---|---|---|---|---|
| Labour / Christchurch 2021 | Valerie Campbell | 13,550 | ? | ? |
| Labour / Christchurch 2021 | Richard Budd | 12,958 | ? | ? |
| Independent | John Knox | 9,957 | ? | ? |
| Informal | | 3,455 | ? | ? |
| Turnout | | ? | ? | ? |
| Registered | | ? | | |
| Labour / Christchurch 2021 win | | | | |
| Labour / Christchurch 2021 win | | | | |

=== Christchurch South constituency ===
Christchurch South constituency
| Affiliation | Candidate | Votes | % | +/− |
|---|---|---|---|---|
| Labour / Christchurch 2021 | Kerry Burke | 14,357 | ? | ? |
| Christchurch 2021 | Diana Shand | 14,282 | ? | ? |
| Independent | Peter Alty | 7,204 | ? | ? |
| Independent Citizens | Neil Neumann | 5,778 | ? | ? |
| Independent | Peter Allen | 4,231 | ? | ? |
| Informal | | 3,386 | ? | ? |
| Turnout | | ? | ? | ? |
| Registered | | ? | | |
| Labour / Christchurch 2021 win | | | | |
| Christchurch 2021 win | | | | |

=== Christchurch West constituency ===
Christchurch West constituency
| Affiliation | Candidate | Votes | % | +/− |
|---|---|---|---|---|
| Christchurch 2021 | Neil Cherry | 12,436 | ? | ? |
| Independent Citizens | Peter Yeoman | 12,441 | ? | ? |
| Green / Christchurch 2021 | Evan Alty | 9,009 | ? | ? |
| Independent Citizens | Errold Paynter | 8,417 | ? | ? |
| Independent | David O'Neill | 5,917 | ? | ? |
| Informal | | 3,745 | ? | ? |
| Turnout | | ? | ? | ? |
| Registered | | ? | | |
| Christchurch 2021 win | | | | |
| Independent Citizens win | | | | |

=== Selwyn-Banks Peninsula constituency ===
Selwyn-Banks Peninsula constituency
| Affiliation | Candidate | Votes | % | +/− |
|---|---|---|---|---|
| Independent | Richard Johnson | 6,001 | 44.19 | ? |
| missing info | Winston McKean | 4,646 | 34.21 | ? |
| missing info | Kevin Allan | 2,093 | 6.19 | ? |
| Informal | | 841 | ? | ? |
| Turnout | | 13,581 | ? | ? |
| Registered | | ? | | |
| Independent win | | | | |

=== Ashburton constituency ===
Ashburton constituency
| Affiliation | Candidate | Votes |
|---|---|---|
| Independent | Angus McKay | Unopposed |
| Registered | | ? |
| Independent win | | |

=== South Canterbury constituency ===
South Canterbury constituency
| Affiliation | Candidate | Votes | % | +/− |
|---|---|---|---|---|
| Independent | Mark Oldfield | 13,768 | 68.18 | ? |
| missing info | Allan Campbell | 4,886 | 24.19 | ? |
| Informal | | 1,541 | 7.63 | ? |
| Turnout | | 20,195 | ? | ? |
| Registered | | ? | | |
| Independent win | | | | |

=== Waitaki constituency ===
Waitaki constituency
| Affiliation | Candidate | Votes |
|---|---|---|
| Independent | Bill Penno | Unopposed |
| Registered | | ? |
| Independent win | | |

== Otago Regional Council ==
2001 Otago Regional Council election
- 13 October 2001
- Registered: 134,209
- Turnout: 81,383 (60.64%)
- 12 seats on the Otago Regional Council; 7 seats needed for a majority
| Party | Seats | +/– |
|---|---|---|
| Independent | 12 | |
This lists parties that won seats. See the complete results below.

=== Dunstan constituency ===
Dunstan constituency
| Affiliation | Candidate | Votes | % | +/− |
|---|---|---|---|---|
| Independent | Donald Harley | 9,758 | ? | ? |
| Independent | Duncan Butcher | 8,914 | ? | |
| Independent | William Randle | 3,839 | ? | ? |
| Informal | | 1 | ? | ? |
| Turnout | | ? | ? | ? |
| Registered | | ? | | |
| Independent win | | | | |
| Independent win | | | | |

=== Moeraki constituency ===
Moeraki constituency
| Affiliation | Candidate | Votes | % | +/− |
|---|---|---|---|---|
| Independent | Douglas Brown | 6,897 | ? | ? |
| Independent | Bill McKerrow | 6,126 | ? | ? |
| Independent | Duncan Taylor | 5,600 | ? | ? |
| Informal | | 797 | ? | ? |
| Turnout | | ? | ? | ? |
| Registered | | ? | | |
| Independent win | | | | |
| Independent win | | | | |

=== Molyneux constituency ===
Molyneux constituency
| Affiliation | Candidate | Votes | % | +/− |
|---|---|---|---|---|
| Independent | Colin Scurr | 9,865 | ? | ? |
| Independent | Douglas Miller | 8,991 | ? | ? |
| Independent | Jon Muirhead | 5,853 | ? | ? |
| Informal | | 1,247 | ? | ? |
| Turnout | | ? | ? | ? |
| Registered | | ? | | |
| Independent win | | | | |
| Independent win | | | | |

=== Dunedin constituency ===
Dunedin constituency
| Affiliation | Candidate | Votes | % | +/− |
|---|---|---|---|---|
| Independent | Patricia Harrison | 21,062 | ? | ? |
| Independent | Louise Croot | 20,762 | ? | ? |
| Independent | Neville Peat | 18,443 | ? | ? |
| Independent | Ian McMeeking | 16,185 | ? | ? |
| Independent | Michael Deaker | 15,369 | ? | ? |
| Independent | Stephen Cairns | 14,756 | ? | ? |
| Independent | Miles Singe | 12,714 | ? | ? |
| Independent | Montague Wright | 12,446 | ? | ? |
| Independent | Bryan Scott | 12,052 | ? | ? |
| Independent | Hazel Murtagh | 12,002 | ? | ? |
| Independent | Alan McDonald | 9,728 | ? | ? |
| Independent | Owen Borlase | 8,162 | ? | ? |
| Independent | Colin Bain | 6,354 | ? | ? |
| Independent | Terance Hannan | 5,105 | ? | ? |
| Informal | | 1,287 | ? | ? |
| Turnout | | ? | ? | ? |
| Registered | | ? | | |
| Independent win | | | | |
| Independent win | | | | |
| Independent win | | | | |
| Independent win | | | | |
| Independent win | | | | |
| Independent win | | | | |

== Southland Regional Council ==
2001 Southland Regional Council election
- 13 October 2001
- Turnout: 34,840 (59%)
- 12 seats on the Southland Regional Council; 7 seats needed for a majority
| Party | Seats | +/– |
|---|---|---|
| Independent | 12 | |
This lists parties that won seats. See the complete results below.

=== Te Anau constituency ===
Te Anau constituency
| Affiliation | Candidate | Votes | % | +/− |
|---|---|---|---|---|
| Independent | Ted Loose | ? | ? | ? |
| missing info | ? | ? | ? | ? |
| ... | ... | ... | ... | ... |
| Informal | | ? | ? | ? |
| Turnout | | ? | ? | ? |
| Registered | | ? | | |
| Independent win | | | | |

=== Awarua constituency ===
Awarua constituency
| Affiliation | Candidate | Votes | % | +/− |
|---|---|---|---|---|
| Independent | Derek Angus | ? | ? | ? |
| Independent | John Matheson | ? | ? | ? |
| missing info | ? | ? | ? | ? |
| ... | ... | ... | ... | ... |
| Informal | | ? | ? | ? |
| Turnout | | ? | ? | ? |
| Registered | | ? | | |
| Independent win | | | | |

=== Hokonui constituency ===
Hokonui constituency
| Affiliation | Candidate | Votes | % | +/− |
|---|---|---|---|---|
| Independent | Stuart Collie | ? | ? | ? |
| Independent | Margaret Muller | ? | ? | ? |
| missing info | ? | ? | ? | ? |
| ... | ... | ... | ... | ... |
| Informal | | ? | ? | ? |
| Turnout | | ? | ? | ? |
| Registered | | ? | | |
| Independent win | | | | |

=== Waikiwi constituency ===
Waikiwi constituency
| Affiliation | Candidate | Votes | % | +/− |
|---|---|---|---|---|
| Independent | Jim Fenton | ? | ? | ? |
| Independent | Ted Tapper | ? | ? | ? |
| missing info | ? | ? | ? | ? |
| ... | ... | ... | ... | ... |
| Informal | | ? | ? | ? |
| Turnout | | ? | ? | ? |
| Registered | | ? | | |
| Independent win | | | | |

=== Gore constituency ===
Gore constituency
| Affiliation | Candidate | Votes | % | +/− |
|---|---|---|---|---|
| Independent | Tracy Hicks | ? | ? | ? |
| Independent | Neil McPhail | ? | ? | ? |
| missing info | ? | ? | ? | ? |
| ... | ... | ... | ... | ... |
| Informal | | ? | ? | ? |
| Turnout | | ? | ? | ? |
| Registered | | ? | | |
| Independent win | | | | |

=== Southern constituency ===
Southern constituency
| Affiliation | Candidate | Votes | % | +/− |
|---|---|---|---|---|
| Independent | Brian Mason | ? | ? | ? |
| missing info | ? | ? | ? | ? |
| ... | ... | ... | ... | ... |
| Informal | | ? | ? | ? |
| Turnout | | ? | ? | ? |
| Registered | | ? | | |
| Independent win | | | | |

=== Dome constituency ===
Dome constituency
| Affiliation | Candidate | Votes | % | +/− |
|---|---|---|---|---|
| Independent | Ali Timms | ? | ? | ? |
| missing info | ? | ? | ? | ? |
| ... | ... | ... | ... | ... |
| Informal | | ? | ? | ? |
| Turnout | | ? | ? | ? |
| Registered | | ? | | |
| Independent win | | | | |

== See also ==
- Results of the 2001 New Zealand territorial authority elections
