= 2001 Lower Hutt mayoral election =

- 13 October 2001
- Turnout: 29,772 (45.76%)
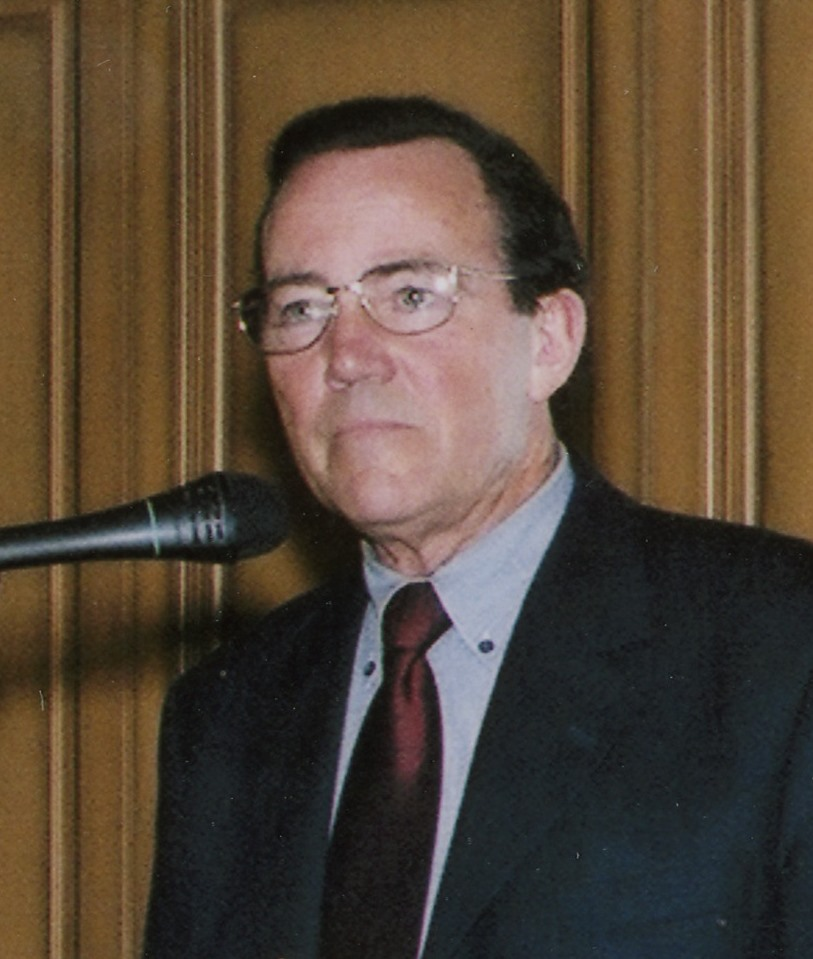

Candidate	John Terris	Scott Dalziell
Party	Independent	Hutt 2020 – Labour
Popular vote	17,033	11,275
Percentage	57.21	37.87
Mayor before election
John Terris
Elected mayor
John Terris

The 2001 Lower Hutt mayoral election was part of the wider 2001 New Zealand local elections. The elections were held for the role of Mayor of Lower Hutt plus other local government positions including eleven city councillors, also elected triennially. The polling was conducted using the standard first-past-the-post electoral method.

== Background ==
The incumbent Mayor, John Terris, stood for a third term. He was opposed by Eastern Ward councillor Scott Dalziell. Terris stood on his record of halving the city's debt in his time as mayor and economic development. Dalziell campaigned against the council's narrow focus on debt levels, rates and punitive user-pay charges. The Labour Party aligned Positive Focus ticket renamed to contest the election as Hutt 2020. While campaigning in the election Dalziell was mauled in an attack from a dog and required plastic surgery. After the election he lobbied for rules on dog control and ownership to be tightened as a result.

== Mayoral results ==
The following table gives the election results:

2001 Lower Hutt mayoral election
Party	Candidate	Votes	%	±%
Independent	John Terris	17,033	57.21	−1.22
Hutt 2020 – Labour	Scott Dalziell	11,275	37.87	
Informal votes		1,464	4.91	
Majority		5,758	19.34	−12.39
Turnout		29,772	45.76	−0.31

== Ward results ==
Eleven candidates were also elected from wards to the Hutt City Council.

Party/ticket	Councillors
City Vision	5
Independent	4
Hutt 2020 – Labour	2
