= 2001 Hutt City Council election =

Local elections in New Zealand

- 13 October 2001
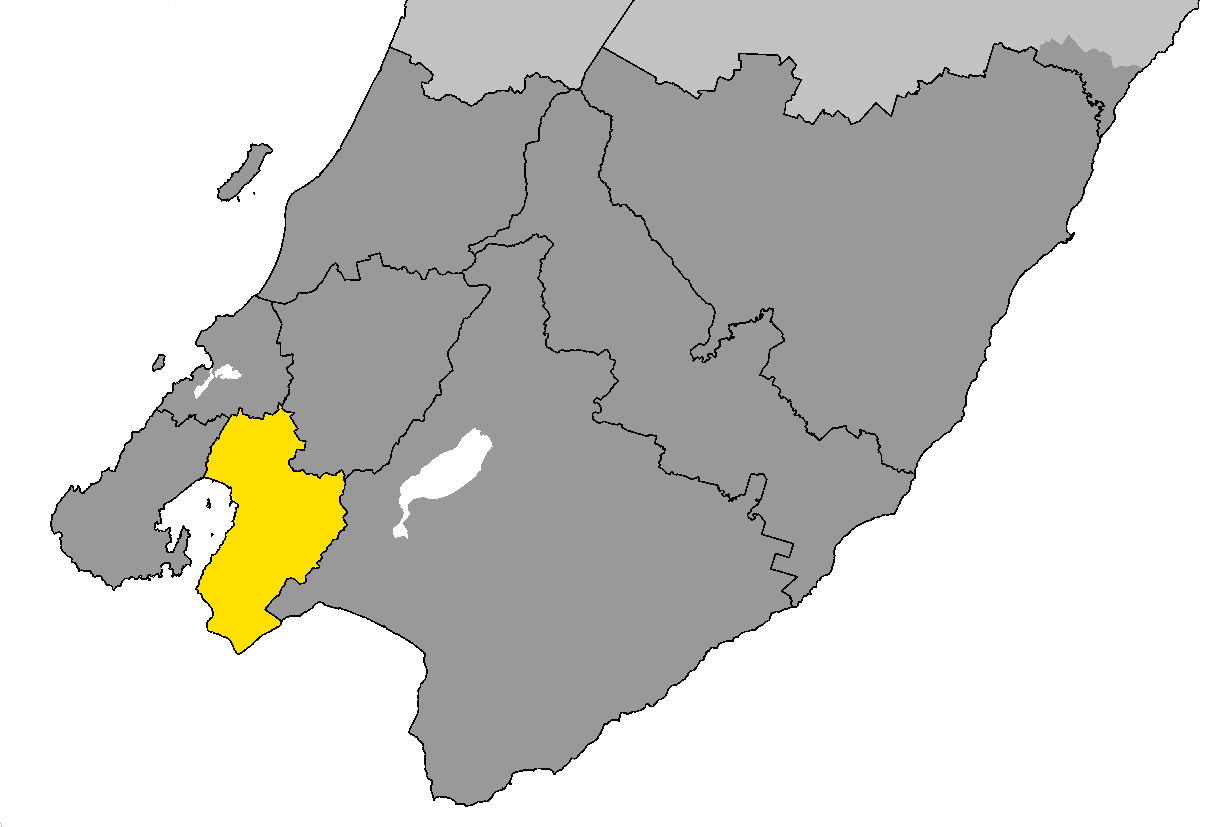
- Position of Hutt City within Wellington Region

The 2001 Hutt City Council election was part of the 2001 New Zealand local elections, to elect members to sub-national councils and boards. Members were elected to the city council, district health board and various local boards and licensing trusts. The polling was conducted using the standard first-past-the-post electoral method.

== Council ==
=== Mayor ===
2001 Lower Hutt mayoral election
Party	Candidate	Votes	%	±%
Independent	John Terris	17,033	57.21	−1.22
Hutt 2020 – Labour	Scott Dalziell	11,275	37.87	
Informal votes		1,464	4.91	
Majority		5,758	19.34	−12.39
Turnout		29,772	45.76	−0.31
Registered electors		65,058		

=== Central Ward ===
The Central Ward elected two members to the Hutt City Council

Central Ward
Party	Candidate	Votes	%	±%
City Vision	Glenda Barratt	3,175	54.66	+14.16
City Vision	John Austad	3,166	54.51	+7.33
Hutt 2020 – Labour	Joan Monrad	2,785	47.95	
Hutt 2020 – Labour	Bill Werry	2,251	38.75	
Informal votes		238	4.09	+0.49
Turnout		5,808	44.02	
Registered electors		13,193		

=== Eastern Ward ===
The Eastern Ward elected two members to the Hutt City Council

Eastern Ward
Party	Candidate	Votes	%	±%
City Vision	Roger Styles	2,705	55.60	−3.07
Hutt 2020 – Labour	Scott Dalziell	1,981	40.71	−1.03
City Vision	Teri Puketapu	1,928	39.63	
Hutt 2020 – Labour	Richard Small	1,749	35.95	
Independent	Nick Ursin	704	14.47	−0.62
Independent	Jim Short	565	11.61	
Informal votes		97	1.99	−1.28
Turnout		4,865	43.93	
Registered electors		11,074		

=== Harbour Ward ===
The Harbour Ward elected two members to the Hutt City Council

Harbour Ward
Party	Candidate	Votes	%	±%
Independent	Ross Jamieson	2,729	53.69	+7.84
Independent	Joy Baird	2,352	46.28	+3.96
Hutt 2020 – Labour	Maureen Burgess	1,980	38.96	
City Vision	James Winton	1,327	26.11	
Hutt 2020 – Labour	Warwick Johnston	1,179	23.19	−1.93
Independent	Chris Paul	452	8.89	
Informal votes		144	2.83	+0.04
Turnout		5,082	41.73	
Registered electors		12,176		

=== Northern Ward ===
The Northern Ward elected two members to the Hutt City Council

Northern Ward
Party	Candidate	Votes	%	±%
City Vision	Angus Finlayson	2,245	55.91	+6.11
Hutt 2020 – Labour	Julie Englebretsen	2,030	50.56	+12.26
Independent	Leigh Sutton	1,875	46.69	
Hutt 2020 – Labour	Steve Ritchie	1,792	44.63	
Informal votes		87	2.16	+0.27
Turnout		4,015	42.87	
Registered electors		9,365		

=== Wainuiomata Ward ===
The Wainuiomata Ward elected two members to the Hutt City Council

Wainuiomata Ward
Party	Candidate	Votes	%	±%
Independent	Ray Wallace	3,507	75.99	−1.14
City Vision	Julie Sylvester	1,767	38.28	+10.12
Independent	Cathie Eady	1,721	37.29	−5.27
Independent	Tracey Pollard	1,282	27.77	
Independent	Reg Moore	842	18.24	−7.47
Informal votes		110	2.38	−1.60
Turnout		4,615	43.33	
Registered electors		10,650		

=== Western Ward ===
The Western Ward elected one member to the Hutt City Council

Western Ward
Party	Candidate	Votes	%	±%
Independent	Margaret Cousins	2,174	56.23	+3.07
City Vision	Kathryn McGavin	1,604	41.48	
Informal votes		88	2.27	−0.49
Turnout		3,866	44.95	
Registered electors		8,600		

== Other local elections ==
=== Wellington Regional Council ===
==== Lower Hutt Ward ====
The Lower Hutt Ward elected three members to the Wellington Regional Council

Lower Hutt Ward
Party	Candidate	Votes	%	±%
Hutt 2020 – Labour	Dick Werry	10,165	39.21	−14.19
Independent	Glen Evans	9,720	37.49	
City Vision	Rosemarie Thomas	9,495	36.63	−23.67
Hutt 2020 – Labour	Peter Glensor	8,749	33.75	
City Vision	David Ogden	8,435	32.54	
Hutt 2020 – Labour	Fred Allen	7,894	30.45	
Independent	Sandra Greig	7,309	28.19	
Independent	Jill Berridge	6,670	25.73	
Independent	Jim Allen	5,048	19.47	−38.62
Independent	Gordon George	3,685	14.21	
Independent	Robert Moncrieff	595	2.29	
Turnout		25,921	39.84	+2.14
Registered electors		65,058		

=== Hutt Valley District Health Board ===
==== Central Ward ====
The Central Ward elected three members to the Hutt Valley District Health Board

Central Ward
Party	Candidate	Votes	%	±%
Hutt 2020 – Labour	Peter Glensor	4,858	27.89	
City Vision	Pat Brosnan	4,762	27.34	
Hutt 2020 – Labour	Vera Ellen	4,435	25.46	
Hutt 2020 – Labour	Marian Redwood	3,692	21.20	
City Vision	Errol Baird	3,575	20.52	
Independent	Marion Cooper	3,203	18.39	
Independent	Sandra Greig	2,733	15.69	
City Vision	Tafa Malifa-Poutoa	2,636	15.13	
Independent	Lynda Battah	2,139	12.28	
Independent	Peter Schumacher	1,933	11.10	
Independent	Tata Parata	1,870	10.73	
Independent	Murray Hosking	1,504	8.63	
Independent	Columban Devine	1,211	6.95	
Independent	Nick Ursin	1,203	6.90	
Independent	Marina Pumphrey	1,134	6.51	
Independent	Georgina Barrett	971	5.57	
Independent	Marie Gillies	955	5.48	
Independent	Stu Carlson	918	5.27	
Independent	John Gilbert	868	4.98	
Independent	Dean Reynolds	866	4.97	
Independent	Beth Watson	726	4.16	
Independent	Catherine Milne-Turner	689	3.95	
Independent	Kevin Boyd	674	3.87	
Independent	Ann Bain	670	3.84	
Independent	Perce Harpham	641	3.68	
Independent	Juanita Neale Saxby	625	3.58	
Independent	Noel Phillip Farmer	573	3.29	
Independent	Alyn Thompson	442	2.53	
Informal votes		1,738	9.98	
Turnout		17,414	41.23	
Registered electors		42,232		

==== Harbour Ward ====
The Harbour Ward elected one member to the Hutt Valley District Health Board

Harbour Ward
Party	Candidate	Votes	%	±%
Hutt 2020 – Labour	Sharron Cole	1,575	29.17	
City Vision	Peter Willis	851	15.76	
Independent	Jim Allen	710	13.15	
Independent	Heather Woolf-Webber	586	10.85	
Independent	Grant Herman	440	8.15	
Independent	Ian Rankine	410	7.59	
Independent	Ewen Chambers-Ross	216	4.00	
Informal votes		610	11.30	
Turnout		5,398	44.33	
Registered electors		12,176		

==== Wainuiomata Ward ====
The Wainuiomata Ward elected one member to the Hutt Valley District Health Board

Wainuiomata Ward
Party	Candidate	Votes	%	±%
Independent	Grant Moffatt	1,782	36.54	
Hutt 2020 – Labour	Pamela Truscott	1,464	30.02	
City Vision	Teri Puketapu	939	19.25	
Independent	Gail Puaheirirangi Maxwell	305	6.25	
Informal votes		386	7.91	
Turnout		4,876	45.78	
Registered electors		10,650		
