= 2001 Porirua City Council election =

Local election in New Zealand

2001 Porirua local elections
- 13 October 2001
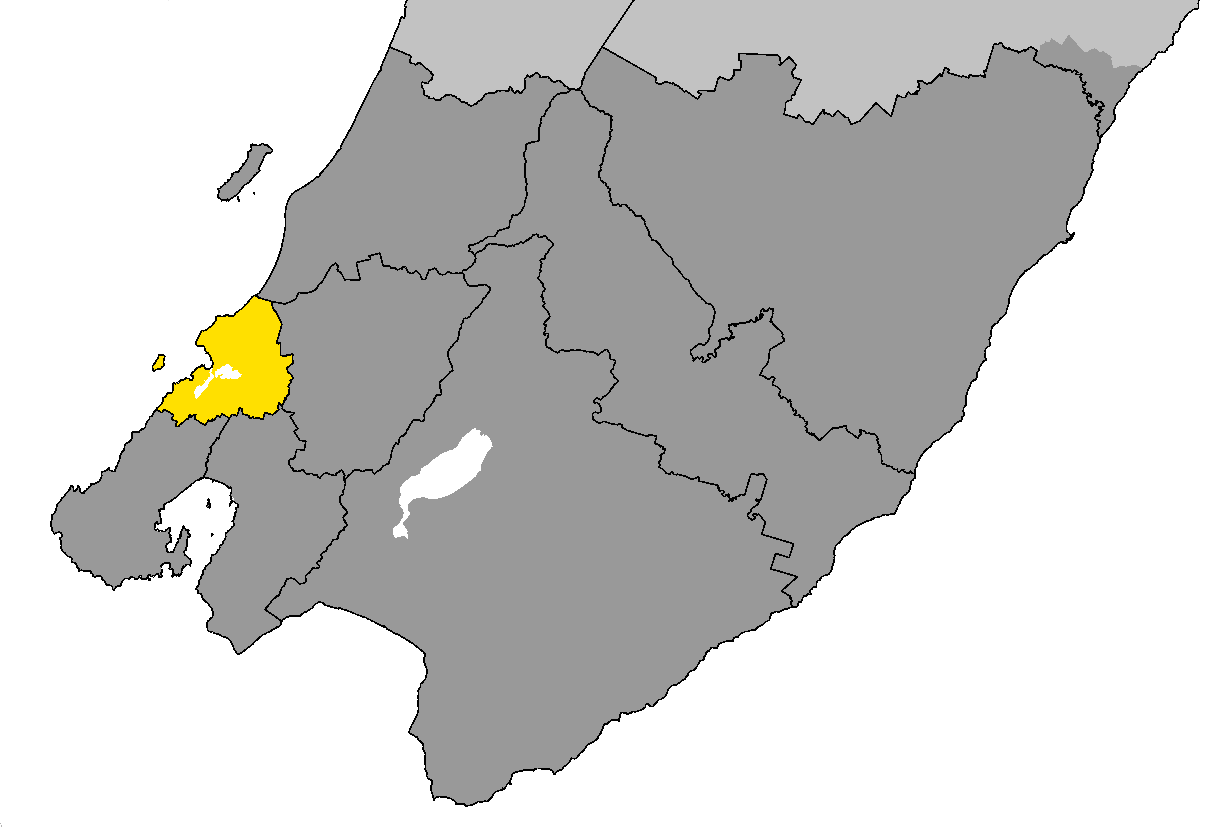
- Position of Porirua City within Wellington Region

The 2001 Porirua City Council election was part of the 2001 New Zealand local elections, to elect members to sub-national councils and boards. Members were elected to the city council, the district health board and various local boards and licensing trusts. The polling was conducted using the standard first-past-the-post electoral method.

== Council ==
The Porirua City Council consisted of a mayor and thirteen councillors elected from three wards (Eastern, Northern and Western).

=== Mayor ===
2001 Porirua mayoral election
Party	Candidate	Votes	%	±%
Independent	Jenny Brash	unopposed		

==== Eastern Ward ====
The Eastern Ward elected five members to the Porirua City Council

Eastern Ward
Party	Candidate	Votes	%	±%
Labour	Jasmine Underhill	2,958	91.72	+17.58
Labour	David Stanley	2,846	88.24	+22.39
Labour	Kevin Watson	2,746	85.14	+19.98
Labour	Litea Ah Hoi	2,732	84.71	
Labour	Naureen Palmer	2,650	82.17	+19.88
Independent	Romeri Ranfurly	1,117	34.63	
Independent	Jason Ryder	1,012	31.37	
Informal votes		65	2.01	+1.72
Majority		1,533	47.53	
Turnout		3,225		

==== Northern Ward ====
The Northern Ward elected five members to the Porirua City Council

Northern Ward
Party	Candidate	Votes	%	±%
Independent	Nick Leggett	4,003	80.28	+34.98
Independent	Sue Dow	3,783	75.87	
Independent	Maureen Gillon	3,756	75.33	−0.26
Independent	John Green	3,305	66.28	+14.26
Independent	Robert Shaw	2,902	58.20	
Independent	Murray Woodhouse	2,887	57.90	−3.92
Green	Olivia Mitchell	2,644	53.02	
Independent	Allan Bloomfield	1,614	32.37	
Informal votes		36	0.72	+0.45
Majority		15	0.30	
Turnout		4,986		

==== Western Ward ====
The Western Ward elected three members to the Porirua City Council

Western Ward
Party	Candidate	Votes	%	±%
Independent	Ken Douglas	1,540	61.42	+16.62
Labour	Bud Lavery	1,375	54.84	+8.48
Independent	Tracey Waters	1,345	53.64	+18.59
Independent	Helen Smith	1,258	50.17	+13.04
Independent	Barbara Seddon	879	35.06	
Independent	Rosemary Hudson	611	24.37	+10.06
Independent	Jim Harland	479	19.10	
Informal votes		34	1.35	−0.35
Majority		87	3.47	
Turnout		2,507		

== Other local elections ==
=== Wellington Regional Council ===
The Porirua Ward elected one member to the Wellington Regional Council

Porirua Ward
Party	Candidate	Votes	%	±%
Labour	Margaret Shields	unopposed		

=== Capital & Coast District Health Board ===
The Porirua Ward elected one member to the Capital & Coast District Health Board

Porirua Ward
Party	Candidate	Votes	%	±%
Labour	Margaret Faulkner	3,442	26.90	
Independent	Don Borrie	2,488	19.44	
Independent	Robert Shaw	2,278	17.80	
Independent	Marama Parore-Katene	1,069	8.35	
Independent	Taima Fagaloa	1,021	7.98	
Independent	Martin Rosevear	575	4.49	
Independent	Angela Yoeman	521	4.07	
Independent	Keith Huntington	168	1.31	
Independent	Ron Bell	123	0.96	
Informal votes		1,108	8.66	
Majority		954	7.45	
Turnout		12,793		
