= 2001 Auckland City mayoral election =

New Zealand mayoral election

- 13 October 2001
- Turnout: 107,928 (42.54%)
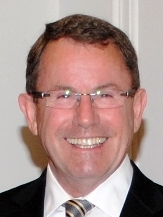

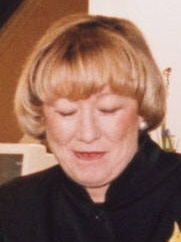

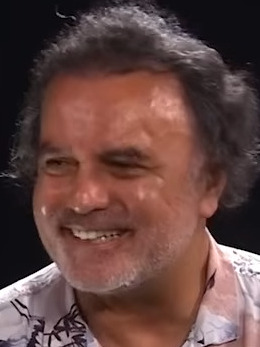

Candidate	John Banks	Christine Fletcher
Affiliation	Independent	Independent
Popular vote	47,059	31,699
Percentage	43.60%	29.37%
Candidate	Matt McCarten	Tony Gibson
Affiliation	Alliance	Independent
Popular vote	15,785	5,714
Percentage	14.63%	5.29%
Mayor before election
Christine Fletcher
Independent
Elected mayor
John Banks
Independent

The 2001 Auckland City mayoral election was part of the New Zealand local elections held that same year. In 2001, elections were held for the Mayor of Auckland plus other local government positions including nineteen city councillors. The polling was conducted using the standard first-past-the-post electoral method.

== Mayoralty results ==
The following table gives the election results:

2001 Auckland mayoral election
Party	Candidate	Votes	%	±%
Independent	John Banks	47,059	43.60	
Independent	Christine Fletcher	31,699	29.37	−10.92
Alliance	Matt McCarten	15,785	14.62	
Independent	Tony Gibson	5,714	5.29	
Green	Metiria Turei	2,213	2.05	
Independent	Sue Henry	1,761	1.63	+0.86
Christians Against Abortion	Phil O'Connor	1,258	1.16	+0.24
One NZ	Walter Christie	1,189	1.10	
Communist League	Felicity Coggan	610	0.56	+0.30
Independent	Fran Van Helmond	437	0.40	
Informal votes		203	0.18	
Majority		15,397	14.26	
Turnout		107,928	42.73	−8.47

== Ward results ==
Candidates were also elected from wards to the Auckland City Council.

Party/ticket	Councillors
Citizens & Ratepayers	9
City Vision	4
Labour	2
Independent	3
