= Barbara Arnott =

18th mayor of Napier, New Zealand

Barbara Arnott QSO
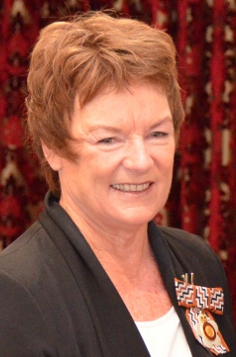
- Arnott in 2014

18th Mayor of Napier
- In office 2001–2013
- Preceded by: Alan Dick
- Succeeded by: Bill Dalton

Personal details
- Born: Barbara Wendy Barron; 1950 (age 75–76)

Barbara Wendy Arnott QSO (née Barron, born 1950) is a New Zealand politician. She served as the 18th mayor of Napier between 2001 and 2013, and was the first female mayor of the city.

Arnott is the daughter of Bill and Mollie Barron, and is married to David Arnott. In the 2014 New Year Honours, Arnott was appointed a Companion of the Queen's Service Order for services to local government and the community.
