= Derek Fox (broadcaster) =

New Zealand politician (born 1947)

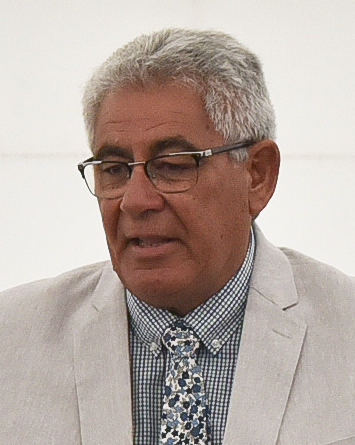
Fox in 2020

Derek Tinia Fox (born 1947) is a New Zealand broadcaster, commentator, publisher, journalist and Māori Party candidate in several elections. He was the Mayor of Wairoa from 1995 to 2001.

== Biography ==
Born in Auckland, Fox grew up 45 km east of Wairoa on the Mahia Peninsula. He is of Ngāti Kahungunu and Ngāti Porou descent.

Fox worked for Television New Zealand until 1986, where he fronted Koha, a Māori current affairs programme, and produced Te Karere, a Māori news programme from 1983. He then launched Mana magazine and Rotorua-based Mana Māori News. He also became the chair of the Māori Broadcasters Association, which was later renamed Ngā Aho Whakaari.

Next he was chairman of the board of Māori Television. Although he hired and then fired (for falsifying his CV) Canadian John Davy as chief executive, Prime Minister Helen Clark said he was the pre-eminent Māori broadcaster of his generation.

Fox contested the 1999 election as an independent in the Ikaroa-Rāwhiti electorate. He stood for the Māori Party in the 2008 election, again in the Ikaroa-Rāwhiti electorate, against Labour's Parekura Horomia. In both elections, he opposed the Māori Affairs minister, but his candidacies were unsuccessful.

He has been a member of the Waitangi Tribunal since 2021.

== Domestic violence ==
Maori Party confirms Fox's domestic violence history.

"He has been guilty of physical abuse 30 or 40 years ago with his wife, and families dealt with that at the time," Prof Winiata said.

"Subsequently, 15 or 16 years ago, he and his partner at the time had an encounter and Derek reported that to the police."

Mr Fox received counselling on anger management after the second incident and did not expect there would be a recurrence.

Asked on Radio New Zealand whether he thought Mr Fox's history should exclude him from becoming an MP, he replied: "Not when it has been dealt with and the person involved has made what appeared to be a very sincere effort to manage what they see as a personal problem."

The party is standing by Mr Fox, who has refused to comment to the media and has not returned NZPA's calls.

He has issued a statement saying he had done things in his past that he regretted, had taken responsibility for them and believed he was now a different person.

== Charlie Hebdo Murders ==
In January 2015, Fox became the subject of considerable public controversy for a Facebook post that blamed Charlie Hebdo editor Stephane Charbonnier for causing the deaths of the victims in the Paris terror attacks.

== See also ==
- List of New Zealand television personalities
