= Independent Citizens =

Local political ticket in Christchurch

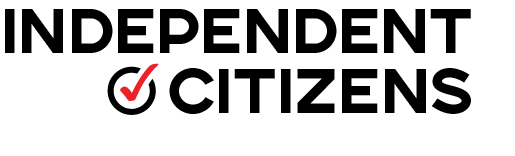
- Chairperson: Jason Middlemiss
- Political position: Centre-right
- Colours: Yellow
- Christchurch City Council: 2 / 17
- Christchurch Community Board members: 6 / 36

Website
- independentcitizens.org.nz

Independent Citizens are a local-body political ticket in Christchurch, New Zealand. They contest seats on the Christchurch City Council and on the city's community boards.

The group's members lean centre-right politically. The group serves as the main group for the city's right wing, acting in opposition to the city's centre-left group The People's Choice.

== Positions and platform ==
The group advocates for traditional centre-right positions, such as lowering rates and spending only on "the basics".

According to Independent Citizens councillor Sam MacDonald, the group's constitution forbids whipping of group members to vote a certain way.

The group is associated with the National Party, though this association is not official.

== History ==
=== 2022–2025 term ===
For the 2022–2025 term, the group had two elected members, James Gough (Fendalton ward) and Sam MacDonald (Waimairi ward). They also had six community board members.

=== 2025 election ===
In the 2025 election, they put forward 3 candidates for city council. Incumbent Sam MacDonald was re-elected unopposed.

== Lists of representatives ==
=== 2022–2025 term ===
Initially two Independent Citizens candidates were elected as councillors and six were elected to community boards. Luke Chandler was appointed to the Waipuna Halswell-Hornby-Riccarton community board following the resignation of People's Choice-affiliated member Gamal Fouda.

Independent Citizens elected members for the 2022–2025 term included:

Ward	Name	Photo
Fendalton	James Gough	
Waimairi	Sam MacDonald	
Community board	Subdivision	Name
Waimāero Fendalton-Waimairi-Harewood (in majority)	Harewood	Jason Middlemiss
Waimāero Fendalton-Waimairi-Harewood (in majority)	Harewood	Linda Chen
Waimāero Fendalton-Waimairi-Harewood (in majority)	Waimairi	Shirish Paranjape
Waimāero Fendalton-Waimairi-Harewood (in majority)	Fendalton	David Cartwright
Waimāero Fendalton-Waimairi-Harewood (in majority)	Fendalton	Bridget Williams
Waipuna Halswell-Hornby-Riccarton (in minority)	Riccarton	Helen Broughton
Waipuna Halswell-Hornby-Riccarton (in minority)	Riccarton	Luke Chandler

== Electoral performance ==
Election	# of candidates					Winning candidates				
Election	Mayor	Council	Board	Regional council	Total	Mayor	Council	Board	Regional council	Total
2022	–	4	?	–		–	2 / 4	?	–	
2025	–	3	8	–	11	–	2 / 3	6 / 8	–	8 / 11 72.7%
