= Frana Cardno =

New Zealand politician

Frana Cardno CNZM QSO JP
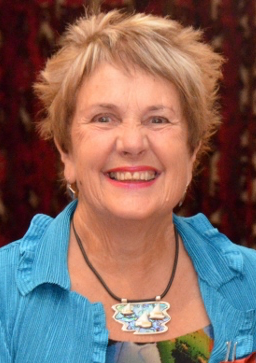
- Cardno in March 2014

2nd Mayor of Southland District
- In office 1992–2013
- Preceded by: John Casey
- Succeeded by: Gary Tong

Personal details
- Born: Frana Grace Srhoy; 29 January 1941 Hokitika, New Zealand
- Died: 23 April 2015 (aged 74) Te Anau, New Zealand
- Spouse: John Murray Cardno (d. 2011)

Frana Grace Cardno CNZM QSO JP (née Srhoy, 29 January 1941 – 23 April 2015) was a New Zealand local-body politician. She served as Mayor of Southland District from 1992 until 2013, becoming the longest-serving female mayor in New Zealand's history.

== Early life and family ==
Born in Hokitika on New Zealand's West Coast in 1941, Cardno was the daughter of a Croatian immigrant, Anthony Srhoy, and his wife Lilian Caroline (née Honey). Cardno moved to Mid Canterbury as a young child, and attended Lowcliffe School. She became a kindergarten teacher. After marrying Murray Cardno in the late 1960s she moved to Te Anau. The couple had three sons and adopted a daughter.

== Political career ==
Cardno served on the Te Anau Community Board for 11 years, and then three years as a Southland District councillor, before being elected mayor of Southland District in 1992. She retired from that role in October 2013 prior to that year's local elections, and was New Zealand's longest-serving female mayor ever. She was a strong opponent to the proposed Fiordland Monorail, which was rejected by the government in 2014.

In 1993, Cardno was awarded the New Zealand Suffrage Centennial Medal. In the 2001 Queen's Birthday Honours, she was appointed a Companion of the Queen's Service Order for public services. Cardno was made a Companion of the New Zealand Order of Merit for services to local government in the 2014 New Year Honours.

Cardno was diagnosed with bile duct cancer in June 2014 and was given four months to live. She had fallen ill while visiting her son and family in the United States. She died at her home in Te Anau on 23 April 2015.
