= Cheviot Bell =

New Zealand lawyer (1892–1960)

Member of the Legislative Council
- In office 27 July 1950 – 31 December 1950

Personal details
- Born: Cheviot Wellington Rangi Dillon Bell; 18 August 1892 Wellington, New Zealand
- Died: 26 September 1960 (aged 68) Masterton, New Zealand
- Political party: National
- Parents: Francis Henry Dillon Bell (father); Caroline Bell (mother)
- Relatives: William Henry Dillon Bell (brother); Arthur Bell (uncle); Brenda Bell (cousin); Dillon Bell (grandfather); William Robinson (grandfather)
- Education: Christ's College
- Alma mater: University of Cambridge

Cheviot Wellington Rangi Dillon Bell (18 August 1892 – 26 September 1960) was a New Zealand lawyer. He was appointed a member of the New Zealand Legislative Council in 1950 as part of National's suicide squad.

== Biography ==
Bell was born in Wellington on 18 August 1892. His father was Sir Francis Bell, a Reform Party leader and later the first New Zealand-born Prime Minister. His mother was Caroline Bell (née Robinson), and his maternal grandfather was William Robinson. He was educated at Christ's College and the University of Cambridge, from where he graduated with a BA. Bell trained as a lawyer. In World War I he was in the 10th Royal Hussars and the Royal Flying Corps, and in World War II was Commandant of the RNZAF Training School at Woodbourne.

He was appointed as a member of the suicide squad by the First National Government in 1950 to vote for the abolition of the Council. Most of the new members were appointed on 22 June 1950, but three more members, including Bell, were appointed on 27 July 1950.

Bell was Wellington divisional chair of the National Party before he moved to the Wairarapa in 1951. He died on 26 September 1960 at his home, "Rangitumau", in Masterton, and his ashes were buried at Karori Cemetery in Wellington.
