= Electoral history of Francis Bell =

List of elections featuring Francis Bell as a candidate

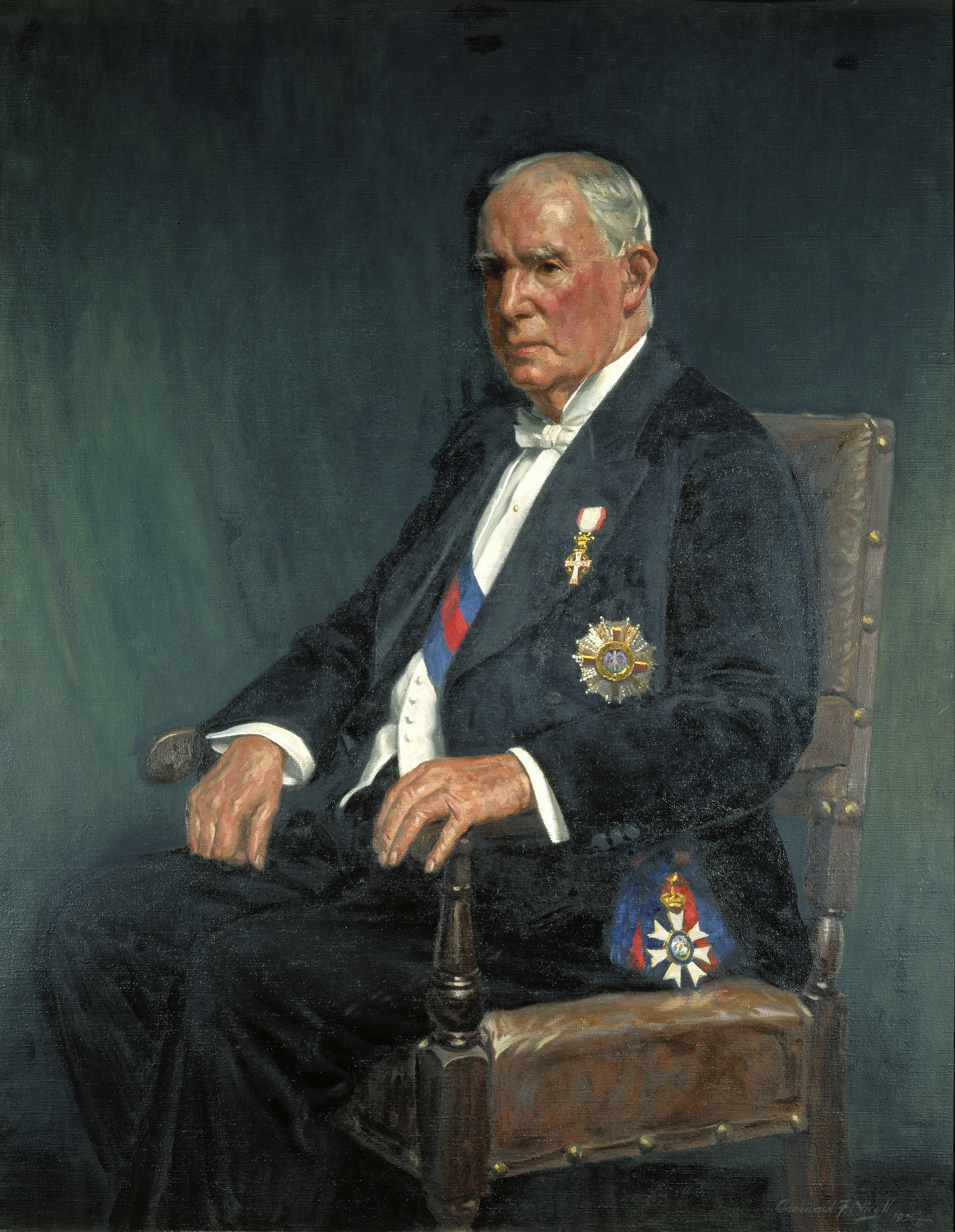
Portrait of Bell in 1935.

This is a summary of the electoral history of Francis Bell, Prime Minister of New Zealand (1925), Mayor of Wellington (1891–93; 1896–97), Member of Parliament for Wellington (1893–96).

== Parliamentary elections ==
=== 1890 election ===
1890 New Zealand general election
Party	Candidate	Votes	%	±%
Liberal	George Fisher	2,828	53.64	
Conservative	John Duthie	2,779	52.71	
Liberal	Kennedy Macdonald	2,482	47.08	
Conservative	Francis Bell	2,299	43.61	
Liberal	Edwin Jellicoe	1,921	35.98	
Liberal	Francis Fraser	1,755	33.29	
Liberal	William McLean	1,060	20.11	
Liberal	Robert Winter	716	13.58	
Majority		183	3.47	
Total votes		15,816		
Turnout		5,272	60.00	
Registered electors		8,786		

=== 1892 by-election ===
1892 City of Wellington by-election
Party	Candidate	Votes	%	±%
Liberal	William McLean	3,388	51.08	+30.97
Conservative	Francis Bell	3,245	48.92	+5.31
Majority		143	2.16	−1.32
Turnout		6,633	75.50	+15.49
Registered electors		8,786		

=== 1893 election ===
1893 New Zealand general election
Party	Candidate	Votes	%	±%
Liberal	Robert Stout	6,218	46.73	
Conservative	Francis Bell	5,773	43.39	
Conservative	John Duthie	4,840	36.37	
Liberal	Kennedy Macdonald	3,863	29.03	
Liberal	Francis Fraser	3,729	28.02	
Independent	Harry Vogel	3,606	27.10	
Liberal	William McLean	3,438	25.84	
Liberal	George Fisher	2,385	17.92	
Independent	Thomas Dwan	1,157	8.70	
Independent	William Travers	1,093	8.21	
Majority		977^{1}		
Informal votes		147		
Total votes		36,249		
Turnout		13,306	80.66	
Registered electors		16,497		

== Local elections ==
=== 1891 election ===
1891 Wellington mayoral election
Party	Candidate	Votes	%	±%
Independent	Francis Bell	1,060	62.31	
Independent	C F Worth	641	37.68	
Majority		419	24.63	
Turnout		1,701		

=== 1892 election ===
1892 Wellington mayoral election
Party	Candidate	Votes	%	±%
Independent	Francis Bell	1,405	70.88	+8.57
Independent	George Fisher	572	28.85	
Informal votes		5	0.25	
Majority		883	44.55	19.92
Turnout		1,982		

=== 1896 election ===
1896 Wellington mayoral election
Party	Candidate	Votes	%	±%
Independent	Francis Bell	1,239	59.25	
Independent	George Fisher	852	40.74	
Majority		387	18.50	
Turnout		2,091		
