= Brenda Bell =

New Zealand pioneer amateur radio operator, community organiser and politician

Brenda Bell QSM
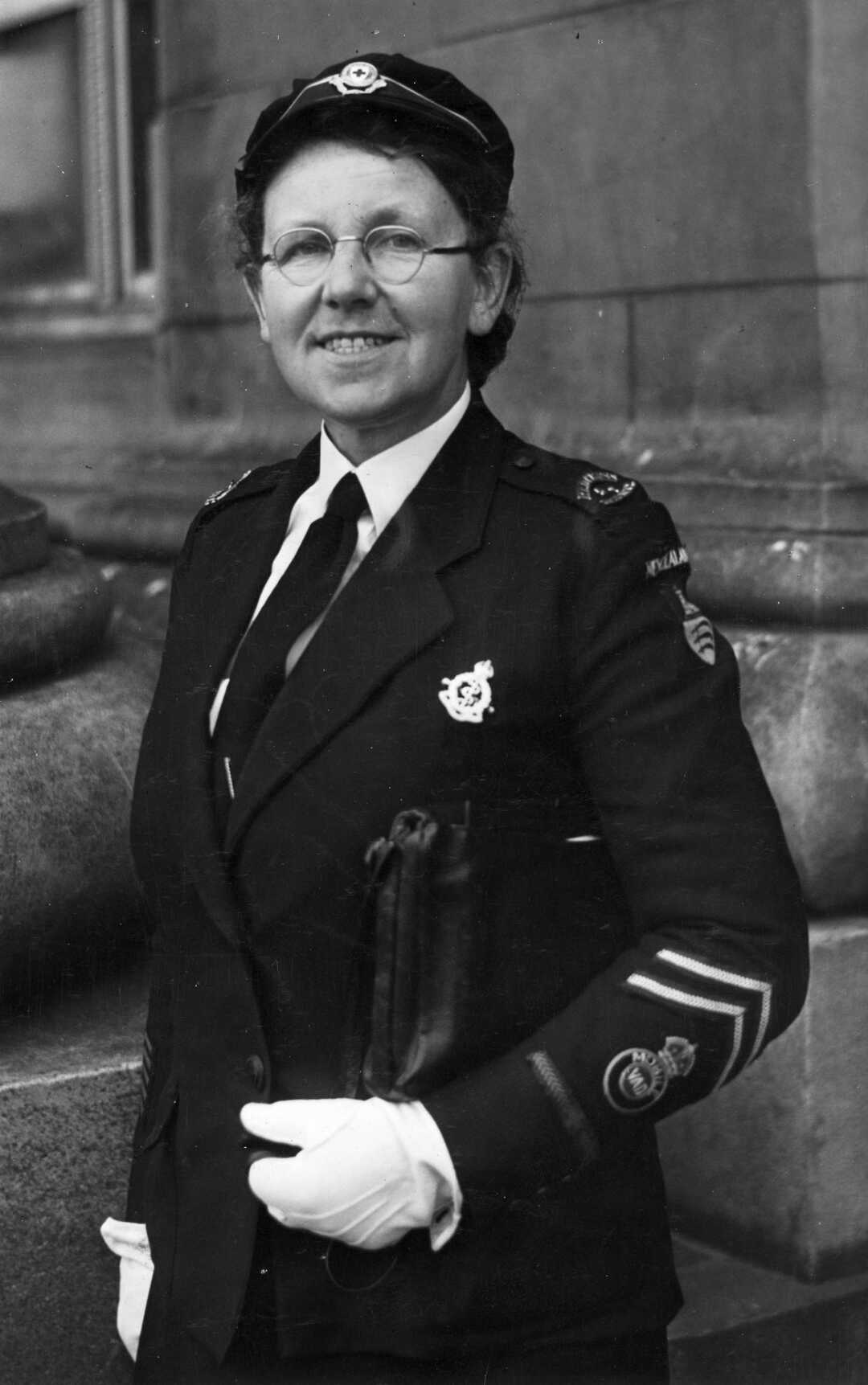
- Born: Margaret Brenda Bell; 18 October 1891; Shag Station, Otago, New Zealand
- Died: 10 August 1979 (aged 87); Dunedin, New Zealand
- Political party: National
- Relatives: Francis Bell (uncle); Arthur Bell (uncle); Dillon Bell (grandfather); Cheviot Bell (cousin); William Bell (cousin)

Margaret Brenda Bell QSM (18 October 1891 – 10 August 1979) was a pioneer amateur radio operator from New Zealand. She was a writer and radio broadcaster.

== Biography ==
Bell was born at Shag Station in eastern Otago, South Island, New Zealand, in 1891. She and her brother Francis were the children of Alfred Dillon Bell and his wife, Gertrude Eliza Robinson (daughter of Henry Wirgman Robinson and Gertrude May Mathias). Alfred was interested in the newly-developed wireless communication and established what is thought to be the first telephone connection in New Zealand, between two farmhouses, and Bell shared her father's interest. Her uncle, Francis Bell, served briefly as prime minister of New Zealand in 1925.

During World War I Bell served as a military hospital cook in England and acted as a hostess at the New Zealand High Commission in London. On her return to Shag Station, she took over the running of the wireless station from her brother Frank, who was running the farm. She became New Zealand's first female amateur radio operator and in 1927 she was the first New Zealander to contact South Africa by radio. In 1931 she joined the Country Women's Institute and later became a member of the Dominion executive. In 1939 she led a group of 70 of members to London to attend a world conference of country women's organisations.

Bell served in the Voluntary Aid Detachment in England in World War II, as a military hospital cook and nurse. After the war Bell worked in professional radio as a writer and broadcaster for Dunedin station 4YA. During the 1950s Bell attended two further world conferences of country women's organisations, in Toronto and Edinburgh, and lectured and broadcast on New Zealand throughout Europe and Australia. In 1960, Bell stood unsuccessfully for the New Zealand National Party against sitting member Ethel McMillan in the safe Labour seat of Dunedin North. She later stood again, unsuccessfully, for the National Party nomination for Waitaki.

In the 1979 New Year Honours, Bell was awarded the Queen's Service Medal for community service. She died in Dunedin on 10 August 1979.
