= Wellington Suburbs and Country =

Wellington Suburbs and Country is a former parliamentary electorate in Wellington, New Zealand, from 1911 to 1919. The electorate was combined from Wellington Suburbs and Wellington Country electorates.

== Population centres ==
In the 1911 electoral redistribution, the North Island gained a further seat from the South Island due to faster population growth. In addition, there were substantial population movements within each island, and significant changes resulted from this. Only four electorates were unaltered, five electorates were abolished, one former electorate was re-established, and four electorates, including Wellington Suburbs and Country, were created for the first time.

Through the 1911 electoral redistribution, the Wellington North and Wellington East electorates gained small but relatively populous areas from the Wellington Suburbs electorate, which was abolished. The vast majority of the latter's area went to the new Wellington Suburbs and Country, but large areas were also gained from the Otaki and Hutt electorates. Settlements that had been covered by the Wellington Suburbs electorate include Miramar Peninsula, Mākara, Mākara Beach, Johnsonville, Ohariu Valley, and Tawa. All these were also included in the Wellington Suburbs and Country electorate, and settlements that were gained included Haywards (from the Hutt electorate), and Judgeford, Pāuatahanui, Titahi Bay, and Pukerua Bay (all from the Otaki electorate).

The Wellington Suburbs electorate had gone "dry" in 1909 after the 1908 election, so the new electorate was also "dry". This and the transfer to an electorate with which they had "no community of interest whatever" led to objections to the transfer from the Pāuatahanui area to their former Otaki MP William Field ("a man interested in farming") and to the Prime Minister Sir Joseph Ward, to no avail. The area had five hotels serving the Cobb & Co coaches which went north through the settlement, and their bars were closed.

In the 1918 electoral redistribution, the Wellington Suburbs and Country electorate was abolished again, and its area split between the Wellington Suburbs and the Otaki electorates. These changes became effective with the 1919 election.

== History ==
The Wellington Suburbs and Country electorate was represented by two Members of Parliament.

=== Members of Parliament ===
Key

Reform

Election	Winner
1911 election	William Henry Dillon Bell
1914 election	Robert Wright
(Abolished 1919; see Wellington Suburbs and Otaki)

== Election results ==
=== 1914 election ===
1914 general election: Wellington Suburbs and Country
Party	Candidate	Votes	%	±%
Reform	Robert Wright	3,258	50.62	
United Labour	Frank Moore	2,256	35.05	−11.30
Liberal	John Edward Fitzgerald	922	14.32	−5.89
Informal votes		58	0.90	+0.56
Majority		1,002	15.56	
Turnout		6,436	81.90	+4.66
Registered electors		7,858		

=== 1911 election ===
1911 general election: Wellington Suburbs and Country, first ballot
Party	Candidate	Votes	%	±%
Reform	William Henry Dillon Bell	2,431	40.48	
Labour	Frank Moore	1,273	21.19	
Independent Liberal	John Edward Fitzgerald	1,214	20.21	
Liberal	John Luke	1,032	17.18	
Informal votes		55	0.91	
Turnout		6,005	80.79	
Second ballot result
Reform	William Henry Dillon Bell	3,060	53.30	+12.82
Labour	Frank Moore	2,661	46.35	+25.16
Informal votes		20	0.34	−0.57
Majority		399	6.95	
Turnout		5,741	77.24	−3.55
Registered electors		7,432		
