= Beatrice Enid Bell =

New Zealand artist and ambulance driver (1888–1977)

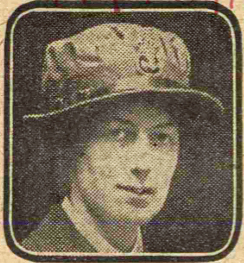
- Enid Bell in 1918
- Born: 25 October 1888; Wellington, New Zealand
- Died: 9 May 1977 (aged 88)
- Other names: Enid Bell, Beatrix Enid Bell
- Citizenship: New Zealand
- Occupations: New Zealand artist, WWI WRNS and Deputy Chief Commissioner for the New Zealand Girl Guides Association
- Organization(s): Women's Royal Naval Service, Girl Guiding New Zealand
- Parents: Sir Francis Henry Dillon Bell (father); Lady Caroline Robinson Bell (mother)
- Relatives: Margaret Sara Bell Johnston (sibling), Iris Brenda Bell Rolleston (sibling), Francis Dillon Bell (sibling), Captain William Henry Dillon Bell (sibling), Sgt. Ernest Dillon Bell (sibling), Violet Caroline Bell Denniston (sibling), Cheviot Wellington Dillon Bell (sibling)
- Awards: British Empire Medal

Beatrice Enid Bell (25 October 1888 – 9 May 1977) was a New Zealand woman who served in Britain and France in World War I and World War II. In World War I, she was the first member of the Women's Royal Naval Service (WRNS). Alongside her service across both world wars with the Admiralty Garage, Bell was an exhibiting artist and active leading figure within New Zealand Girl Guides. Whilst in London, she studied art with well-known English artists and exhibited some of her paintings.

== Early life ==
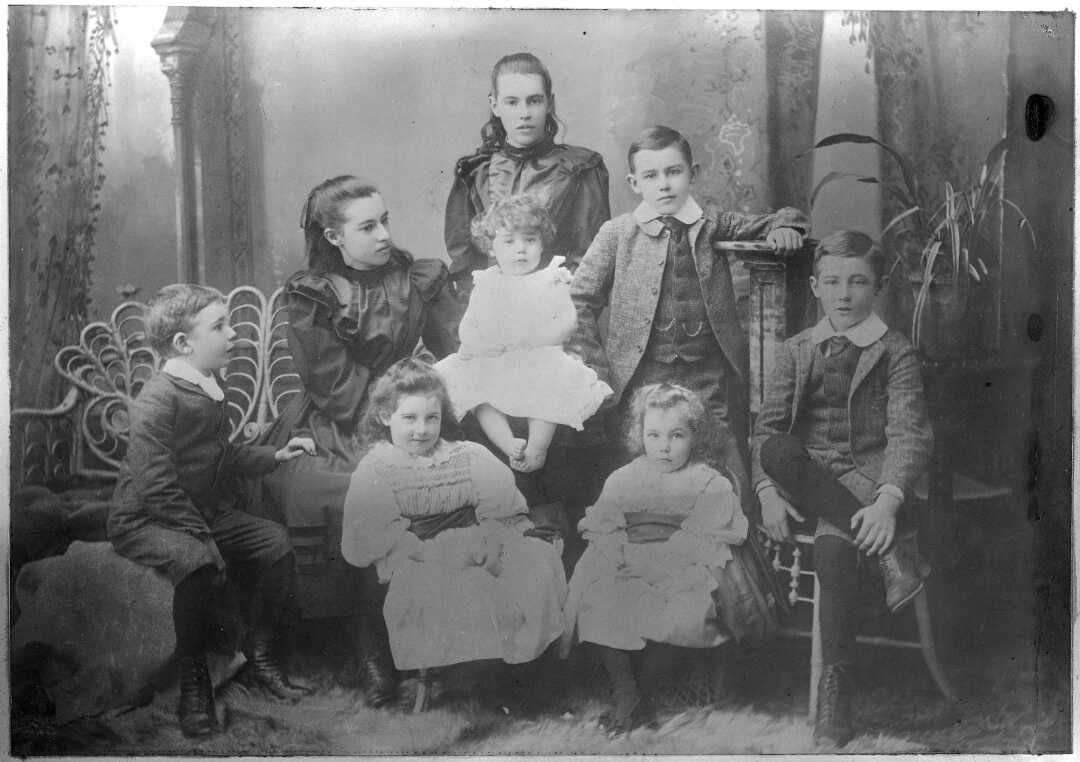
Enid and Violet are seated in the front centre in this undated family photo.

Bell was the daughter of Sir Francis Bell, the first New Zealand-born Prime Minister of New Zealand, and Lady Caroline Bell.

Bell passed her exam in home nursing on 2 July 1915 at the Y.W.C.A Rooms in Wellington.

== War service ==
Caroline, Enid and her sister Violet travelled to England in July 1915, and the two sisters began nursing at Cheltenham Hospital. At that time three of their brothers were serving in the forces. In 1916 both sisters were on washing up duty in the kitchen of the New Zealand War Contingent Association hospital in Walton-on-Thames, while Caroline Bell assisted in the hospital's sewing room.

Bell worked with the Admiralty Garage (21 January 1918 – 16 February 1919) as an ambulance driver in France and London and for the Red Cross in April 1917. Her role during World War I included working as a mechanic, ambulance driver and assistant instructor at the Red Cross Motor School. Her journey to the WRNS began with being chosen by Dame Katharine Furse, which led to her position at the Admiralty Garage.

An account of Bell's experiences in her first six weeks as an ambulance driver in France in 1917 is recorded in her diaries. She wrote about the people she met and places she travelled through, as well as transport challenges she faced whilst in Etaples and the car she had to fix continuously along her journeys. Of one occasion, Bell wrote: "I found the car, the same car that Noah drove to the ark in I should think. No switchboard, no headlights, no self-starter and no indication of how to start her, matches gave out again. I gradually worked up to find myself swearing most volubly. I didn't know I could, but I only gave up from exhaustion."

Biographer Susanne Alway describes Bell's diary entries as "an unvarnished account of the often forgotten support work carried about by civilians on the Western Front." Alway also argues that the descriptions of women in the diary depict them as breaking stereotypes of women at war at that time.

In November 1918 Bell transported senior officers to the mass surrender of German submarines at Harwich. The officers asked Bell to accompany them on board, so she became "the only woman present at sea to receive the surrender of the U-boats".

Margaret, Lady Ampthill, who was the Voluntary Aid Detachments Head of Department, once left a note on Bell's Red Cross Card stating about Bell: "Intelligent, capable woman. Very popular".

The London Gazette of 6 May 1919 carried a notice of a medal awarded to Bell: "The King has been graciously pleased to confer the Medal of the Military Division of the Most Excellent Order of the British Empire upon the undermentioned members of the Women's Royal Naval Service for services in connection with the War: — Miss Enid Beatrix Bell, Chief Section Leader (Mechanic)".

Bell returned to Britain to serve in World War II as an ambulance driver. This included driving on night duty through the London Blitz. Using her artistic skills, Bell also worked for a small secret unit which made scale models of areas of military importance and designed and painted camouflage patterns.

== Girl Guides ==
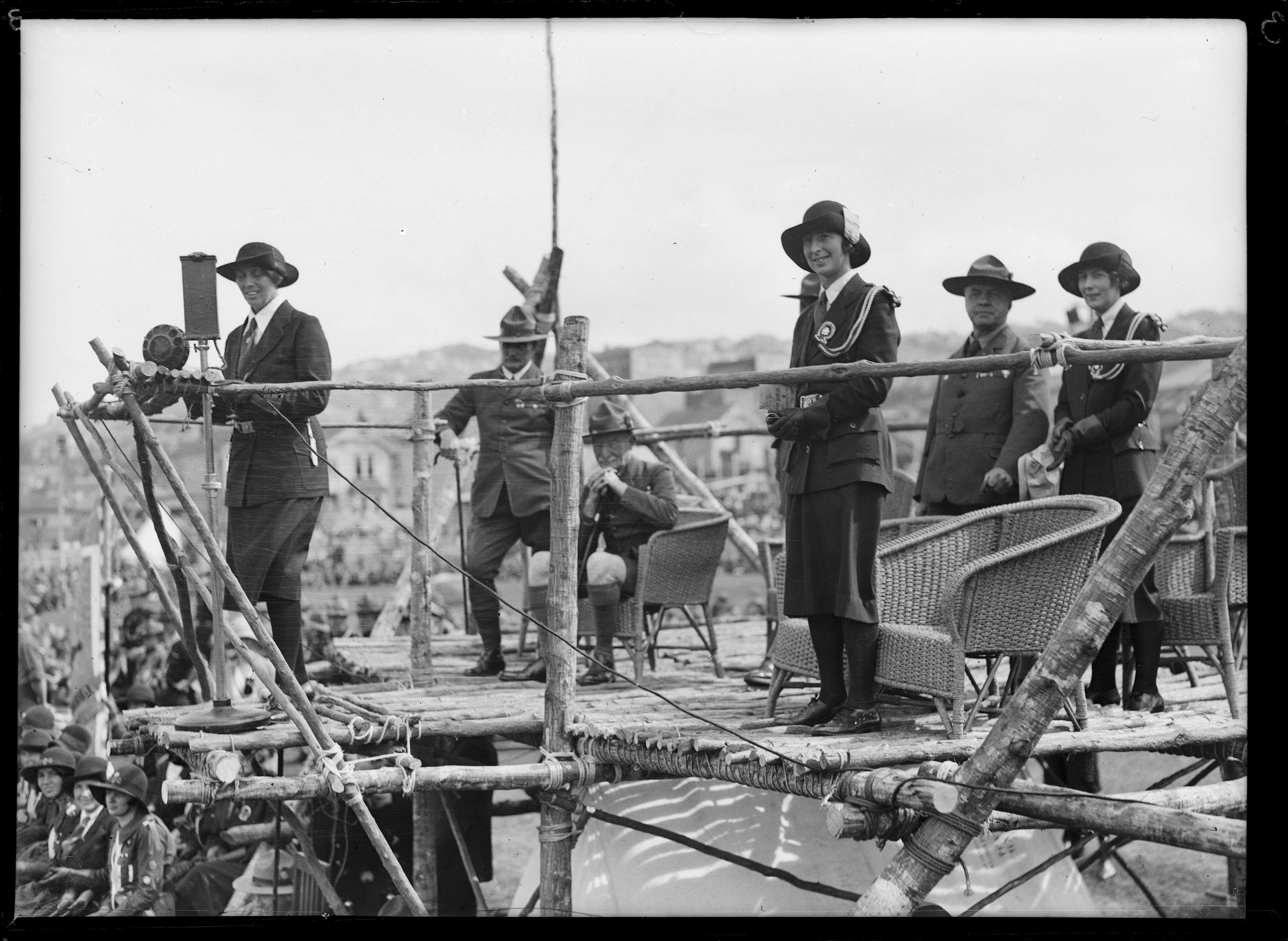
Enid is standing right of the centre in front of a chair, during Lady Baden-Powell's speech at a Girl Guide and Scout rally at the Basin Reserve, Wellington in 1931.

Bell played a significant role in the Wellington Girl Guides. During her time in England, she attended the Imperial Camp for Guiders at Foxlease Hall, New Forest in July 1928.

The training took place over 10 days with 400 people from all over the world gathered, alongside the following notable figures: chief guide Lady Baden Powell, headquarter officials, Miss Tompkins of Petone, Dr. Margaret Knight of Auckland, Miss Corrigan of Hāwera, Lady Gwendoline Jellicoe (New Zealand's representative on the Imperial Council), and Princess Mary who spent a day in Foxlease during the event.

Media sources from the time recorded Bell telling a reporter about the event. She described it as training with specialist lecturers and the opportunity to visit one to two English guide companies.

She returned home to New Zealand via the Maunganui in early December 1928, and was announced Deputy-Provincial Commissioner of the Wellington Girl Guides.

== Art ==
During her ten year stay in London, Bell lived with her sister Iris Brenda (also known as Mrs Hector Rolleston), and joined the London Auxiliary Ambulance. However, Bell still pursued art at this time. She studied with R.G. Eves, an English portrait painter, and exhibited some of her work with the Women's International Art Club when the war first began.

As of September 1946, she had spent six months with other English artists like Frederick Whiting and Ian McNab at the Heatherly School. In the same year she returned to New Zealand via the Akaroa with the intention of visiting family, with a visit to her sister Mrs. Geoffrey Denniston in Gisborne planned, and spending more time on her art.

== Exhibitions ==
Name	Location	Works Included	Institution
New Zealand Academy of Fine Arts Forty-Sixth Annual Exhibition, 1934	Whitmore Street, Wellington	In Bali, Dutch East Indies (£3), South Australian Vineyard (£3)	New Zealand Academy of Fine Arts
New Zealand Academy of Fine Arts 1883–1983			New Zealand Academy of Fine Arts
New Zealand Academy of Fine Arts Forty-Seventh Annual Exhibition, 1935	Whitmore Street, Wellington		
Canterbury Society of Arts Forty-Fourth Annual Exhibition, 1924	Christchurch, New Zealand	The Lincoln Road (£2), Still Moon (£2)	Canterbury Society of Arts
Otago Art Society			

== Later life and death ==
Bell settled in Heretaunga, Wellington after World War II and died in 1977.
