= Violet Bell =

New Zealand woman who served in World War I

Violet Caroline Bell Denniston MBE (25 July 1890 – 1983) was a New Zealand woman who served in Britain and France in World War I.

== Biography ==
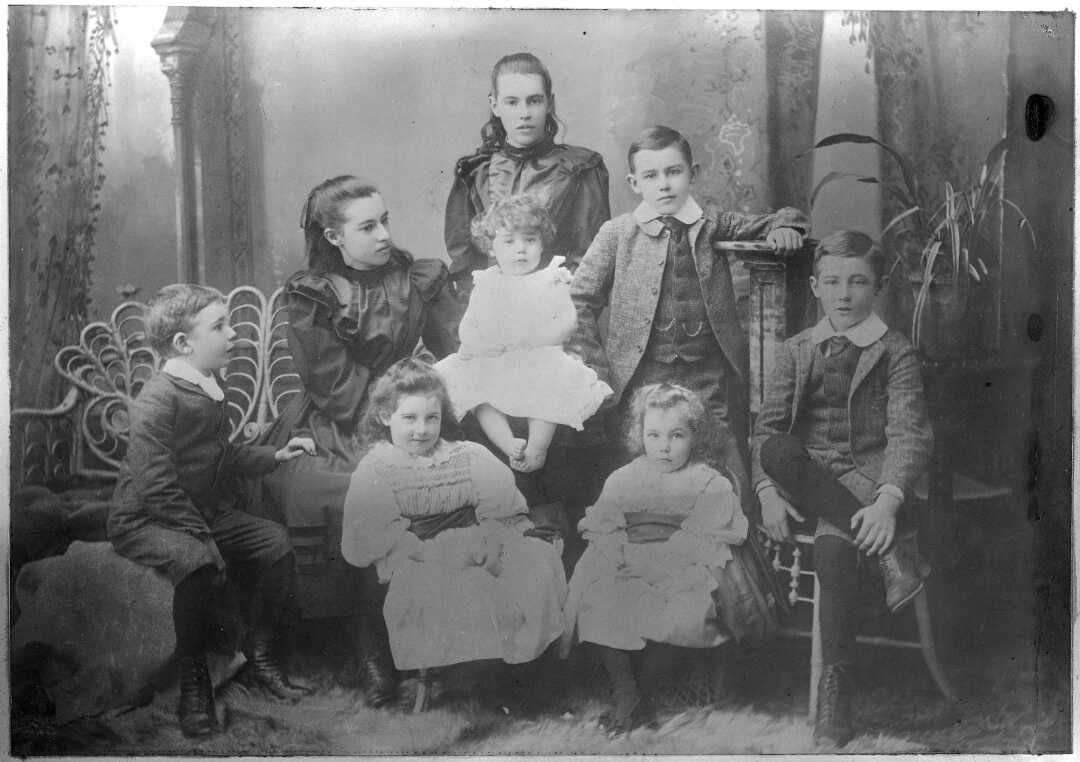
Enid and Violet are seated in the front centre in this undated family photo.

Bell was the youngest daughter of politician Sir Francis Bell and his wife Lady Caroline Bell. She was born and grew up in Thorndon, Wellington. She attended Fitzherbert Terrace School, now Samuel Marsden Collegiate School.

When World War I broke out, Bell, her sister Beatrice Enid Bell and their mother Caroline travelled to Britain, aiming to help out in the war effort. They volunteered with the New Zealand War Contingent Association, and were assigned to the Association's hospital for New Zealand soldiers at Walton-on-Thames. Bell and her sister worked in the hospital's kitchen.

In July 1917, Bell was asked by senior New Zealand military officers to go to Rouen in France and lead a section of Voluntary Aid Detachment (VAD) women in the New Zealand Expeditionary Force (NZEF) Records section. She was assigned the rank of Forewoman in Queen Mary's Army Auxiliary Corps.

== Personal life ==
In 1921, Bell married John Geoffrey Denniston. They had two sons.
