= Manor Park, New Zealand =

Suburb of Lower Hutt, New Zealand

Manor Park
- Suburb
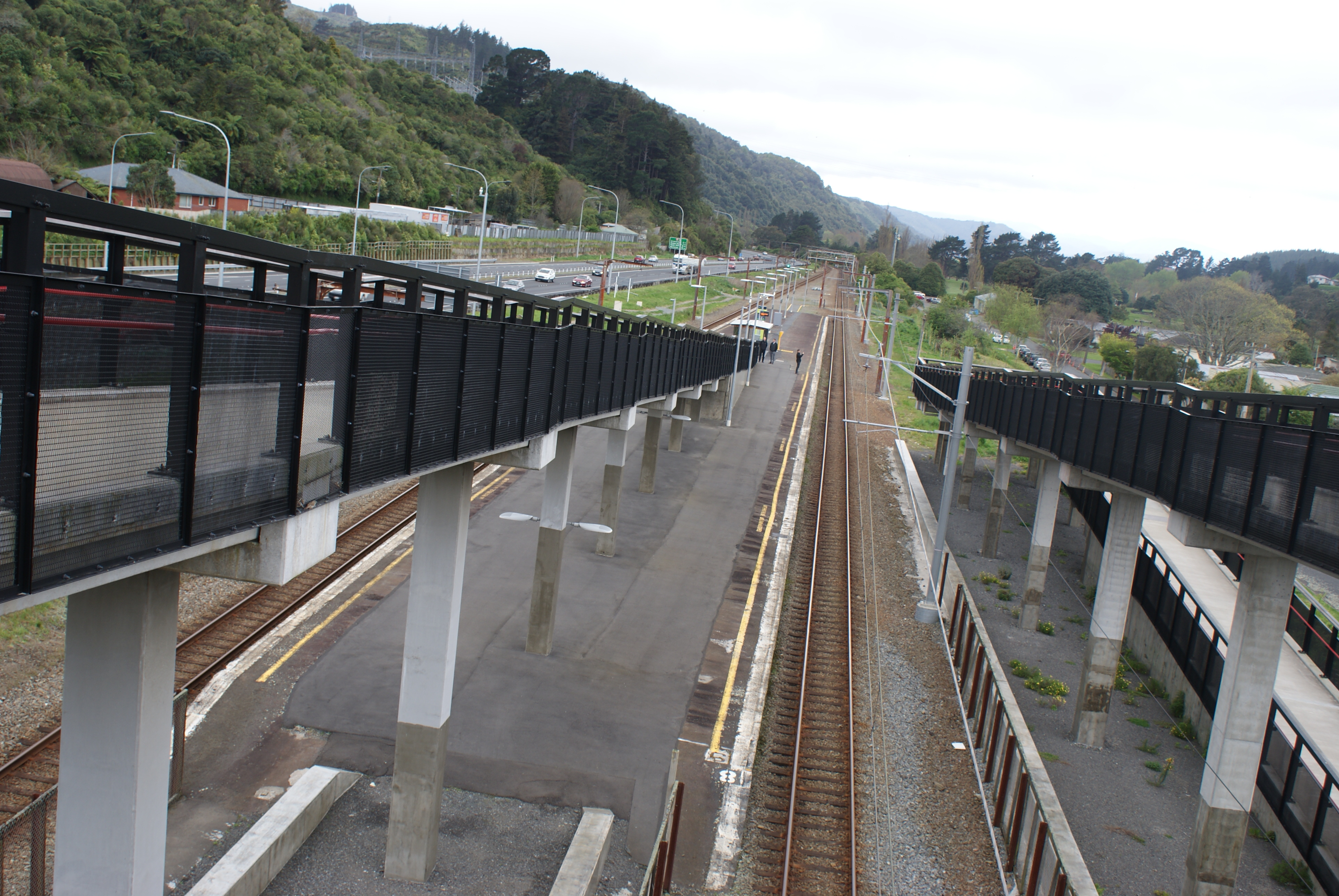
- Manor Park station
- Interactive map of Manor Park
- Coordinates: 41°09′30″S 174°58′45″E
- Country: New Zealand
- City: Lower Hutt City
- Local authority: Hutt City Council
- Electoral ward: Western
- Established: 1925

Area
  - Land: 159 ha (390 acres)

Population (June 2025)
  - Total: 540
  - Density: 340/km^{2} (880/sq mi)
- Train stations: Manor Park railway station

| | Haywards |
| | Manor Park | Pinehaven |
| Pomare | Stokes Valley |

Manor Park, a northern suburb of Lower Hutt City, lies in the south of the North Island of New Zealand. The suburb separates the western bank of the Hutt River from State Highway 2.

The suburb is served by the Manor Park railway station

== History ==
At the end of 1925, W.H. George auctioned his Manor Park Estate, which at the time was part of Haywards. Much of it was subdivided and sold as township sections. Part of the land was purchased by Karori Golf Club, which renamed itself to Manor Park Golf Club after moving there and opening a course in 1926.

A flood in April 1931 swept away Manor Park Bridge, a private bridge that connected the suburb with Stokes Valley. The flood also caused damage to the Manor Park Golf Course.

The suburb was previously home to Manor Park School, which has admission records dating back to 1962. The school was declared closed on 15 February 1996.

== Landmarks ==
Manor Park is home to the Manor Park Golf Club. The suburb is mostly residential, other than the aforementioned golf club and a small private hospital. Over recent years new houses have been built at the southern end of the suburb.

== Demographics ==
Manor Park statistical area covers 1.59 km^{2} (0.61 sq mi) and includes Haywards. It had an estimated population of 540 as of June 2025, with a population density of 340 people per km^{2}.

Historical population
| Year | Pop. | ±% p.a. |
|---|---|---|
| 2006 | 381 | — |
| 2013 | 390 | +0.33% |
| 2018 | 417 | +1.35% |
| 2023 | 525 | +4.71% |

Manor Park had a population of 525 in the 2023 New Zealand census, an increase of 108 people (25.9%) since the 2018 census, and an increase of 135 people (34.6%) since the 2013 census. There were 267 males and 258 females in 168 dwellings. 3.4% of people identified as LGBTIQ+. The median age was 43.6 years (compared with 38.1 years nationally). There were 78 people (14.9%) aged under 15 years, 81 (15.4%) aged 15 to 29, 231 (44.0%) aged 30 to 64, and 138 (26.3%) aged 65 or older.

People could identify as more than one ethnicity. The results were 69.7% European (Pākehā); 11.4% Māori; 8.0% Pasifika; 22.3% Asian; 0.6% Middle Eastern, Latin American and African New Zealanders (MELAA); and 3.4% other, which includes people giving their ethnicity as "New Zealander". English was spoken by 95.4%, Māori by 2.9%, Samoan by 2.9%, and other languages by 20.0%. No language could be spoken by 3.4% (e.g. too young to talk). New Zealand Sign Language was known by 1.7%. The percentage of people born overseas was 28.6, compared with 28.8% nationally.

Religious affiliations were 34.3% Christian, 6.9% Hindu, 2.9% Islam, 1.1% Māori religious beliefs, 4.6% Buddhist, and 2.9% other religions. People who answered that they had no religion were 42.9%, and 6.3% of people did not answer the census question.

Of those at least 15 years old, 114 (25.5%) people had a bachelor's or higher degree, 219 (49.0%) had a post-high school certificate or diploma, and 111 (24.8%) people exclusively held high school qualifications. The median income was $43,100, compared with $41,500 nationally. 66 people (14.8%) earned over $100,000 compared to 12.1% nationally. The employment status of those at least 15 was 222 (49.7%) full-time, 39 (8.7%) part-time, and 3 (0.7%) unemployed.
