= William Robinson (runholder) =

New Zealand runholder and politician (1814–1889)

The Hon William Robinson MLC
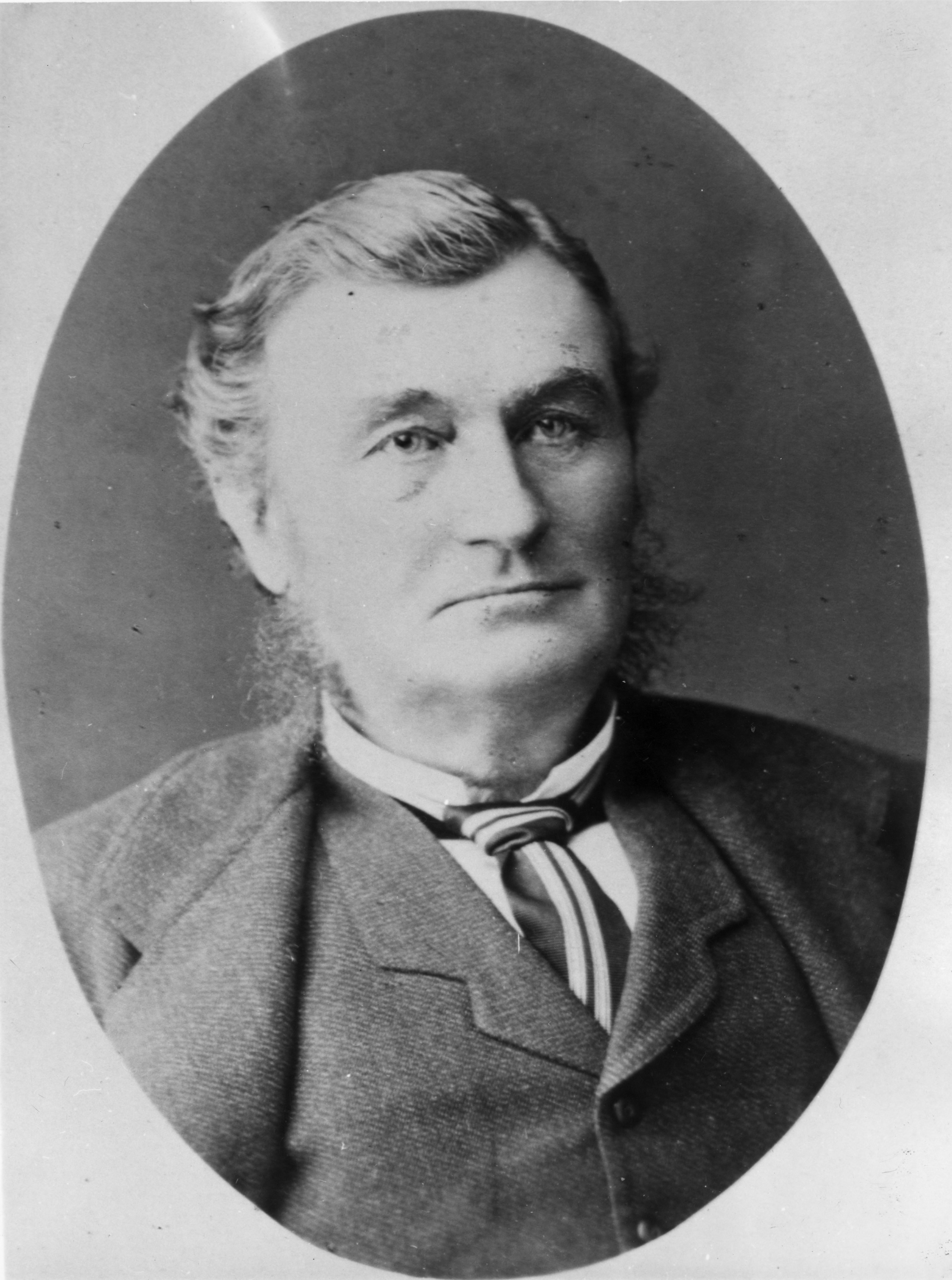
- Portrait of William Robinson

Member of the New Zealand Legislative Council
- In office 4 May 1869 – 9 September 1889

Personal details
- Born: 4 May 1814 Warrington, Lancashire, England
- Died: 9 September 1889 (aged 75) Christchurch, New Zealand
- Resting place: Riccarton Cemetery, Christchurch
- Party: Independent
- Spouse: Eliza Jane Robinson (nee Wood)
- Relations: Francis Bell (son-in-law)
- Children: One boy (died in infancy) and five girls
- Occupation: Runholder

William Robinson (4 May 1814 – 9 September 1889), also known as Ready Money Robinson, was a New Zealand runholder and member of the New Zealand Legislative Council.

== Early life ==
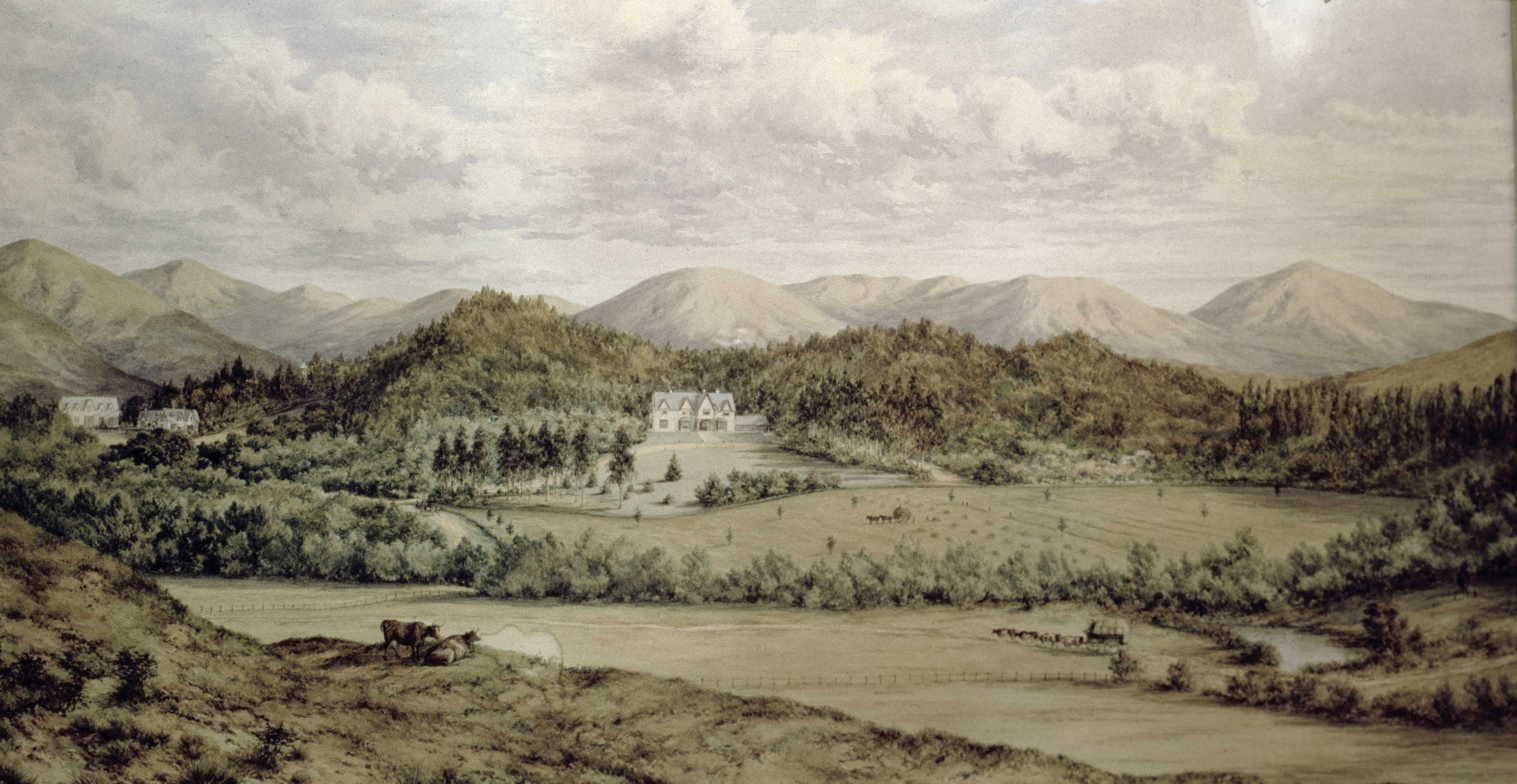
The original Cheviot Hills homestead in ca 1870

Robinson was born in 1814 in Bold Hall near Warrington, Lancashire, England. His parents, Thomas Robinson and Elizabeth Lyons, were tenant farmers.

== Life in Australia ==
He emigrated to South Australia in September 1839 on the Lady Lilford, and promptly took up grazing pursuits, being a pioneer settler at Inman Valley. His next venture, in 1841, was droving 6,000 sheep and 500 cattle overland from New South Wales to South Australia. While droving, he and his party were attacked by Aborigines. That triggered the Rufus River massacre: he participated in killing at least 30 Aborigines, and was speared in his left arm.

In 1844, on the Hill River in the Clare Valley he established the prosperous Hill River Station, comprising over 100 square miles (260 km^{2}). He there became a close associate of fellow pastoralist John Jackson Oakden who, like Robinson, was later to move to New Zealand. While in Australia he met and married Eliza Jane Wood. Sensing that New Zealand had better opportunities, he dispatched John Jackson Oakden as his agent to New Zealand to assess the situation. By 1856 Robinson had sold Hill River Station, which made him a wealthy man.

== Move to New Zealand ==
He and his family moved from Adelaide to New Zealand, arriving in Nelson on 1 May 1856 and initially resided in Nelson. On 5 May Robinson deposited £10,000 with the Nelson commissioner of Crown lands. He sought right of choice, under Governor George Grey's 1853 regulations, over 40,000 acres of 5s. land. While Robinson’s claim was not legal, the acceptance of his deposit by validated it, despite the regulations expiring the next month, without full payment. This allowed Robinson to obtain claim title to the flats and best portions of the massive Cheviot Hills from under the nose of the existing crown lease holder, John Scott Caverhill (1820–1897). Caverhill then made the best terms he could, and exchanged his lease of Cheviot with Robinson in return for the lease of the Hawkswood run which Robinson purchased for him. Between 1857 and 1862 Robinson was able to freehold the entire Cheviot Hills run for a total of £31,455. William James Gardner, in his book A Pastoral Kingdom Divided, said that this "was probably the largest and most spectacular transaction of the kind ever undertaken in New Zealand". It was the purchase of Cheviot Hills and his paying for it in cash, which gave him the sobriquet of "Ready Money Robinson." The land, which extended from the Hurunui River in the south, the Waiau Uwha River in the north, the Lowry Peaks range to the west and the Pacific Ocean coastline to the east, amounted to 84,248 acres (34,094 ha). Only the Glenmark station of George Henry Moore was more valuable.

Robinson represented the Amuri electorate on the second Nelson Provincial Council from 5 October 1857 until 2 April 1859.

Between 1859 and 1866, the Robinsons lived in England. He pursued his hobby of horse racing during that time. In Panama on his journey back to New Zealand, he met and employed Simon Cedeno and employed him as his butler. It was fashionable in Europe at the time to have a coloured staff member.

Back in New Zealand, Robinson lived part of the time in Christchurch, and part of the time on his Cheviot Hills estate. He became a dominant figure in horse racing circles. Among the many horses with which he had wins in New Zealand were Disowned, Cheviot Grip, Foul Play, Liverpool, Natator, Nonsense, Oudeis, Salvage, Silver Prince and Vanguard. He made two or three attempts at winning major races in Australia but was never successful.

He had a slipway built in a locality that became known as Port Robinson, from which he shipped wool. He had a homestead built on his station in 1888, which burned down in 1936.

Robinson was appointed to the Legislative Council on 4 May 1869 and served until his death.

== Cedeno murder ==
On the afternoon of 9 January 1871, Robinson’s butler Simon Cedeno (who was 28 at the time) in response to being teased about his fiancée by housemaids Bridget Murray and Margaret Burke attacked Murray with a long-bladed bread knife whilst she was upstairs. He struck at her head, but a backward movement so diverted the blow that it fell upon her face and chest, which caused Murray to fall to the floor. Cedeno doubtless thinking he had killed her, returned to the kitchen, where he found Burke, who upon seeing Cedeno’s excited manner and the knife covered with blood ran screaming into the dining-room, where were seated Mrs Robinson and Mr Campbell. Cedeno followed her, and after Burke stumbled over some article of furniture, was able to reach and stab her several times before Mr Campbell, immediately followed by Mrs Robinson, were able to restrain him, Mrs Robinson receiving a wound in the hand during the struggle before Mr Campbell was able to take the knife from Cedano and then with the aid of one of Mr Robinson’s grooms take him to the Police Station. Upon arrival of doctors Turnbull and Prins, Burke was found to be dead of three wounds, one of which had penetrated the heart. Murray survived as her breastbone had prevented a fatal penetration.

At the trial, where he was represented by Thomas Joynt, Cedeno claimed that he would have killed Robinson as well, as he was subject to racial abuse; Robinson had left for Cheviot Hills on the morning of the murder. Cedeno was executed at Lyttelton Gaol on 21 April of that year; the second of seven people executed at that jail. There are varying accounts of where the Robinson household was at the time, with most putting the scene of the murder on Park Terrace. In her book Ready Money, Robinson's great-granddaughter states that for the summer of 1870/71, they had rented the house of Frederick Weld on the corner of Cambridge Terrace and Montreal Street. It was in the following year that Robinson bought his house at 52 Park Terrace (these days the site of The George Hotel), as they did not wish to stay in the house again where the murder happened.

== Death and legacy ==
Robinson died at his town house in Park Terrace on 9 September 1889. His wife had died before him; he was survived by five daughters. He was buried at Riccarton Cemetery, Christchurch next to his wife. At the time of his death while Cheviot Hills valued for property tax purposes at £304,826 it was encumbered with a large debt to the Union Bank of Australia. After his death, in order to prevent family disputes his son-in-law Francis Bell sold the estate land on behalf of Robinson’s daughters to the government for £260,223 in 1893. This paved the way for land reform in New Zealand, and was the first of the large South Island stations to be subdivided. Cheviot Hills was subdivided into 54 farms and the township of Cheviot.

== Personal life ==
He married Quebec-born Eliza Jane Wood (1827–1873) on 4 July 1846 at Adelaide. They had five daughters, Elizabeth Eliza, Sara, Caroline (1853–1935), Eleanor and Emily, as well as a son who died in infancy. His third daughter, Caroline married Francis Bell, a later Prime Minister, in 1878.
