= Haywards =

- Suburb
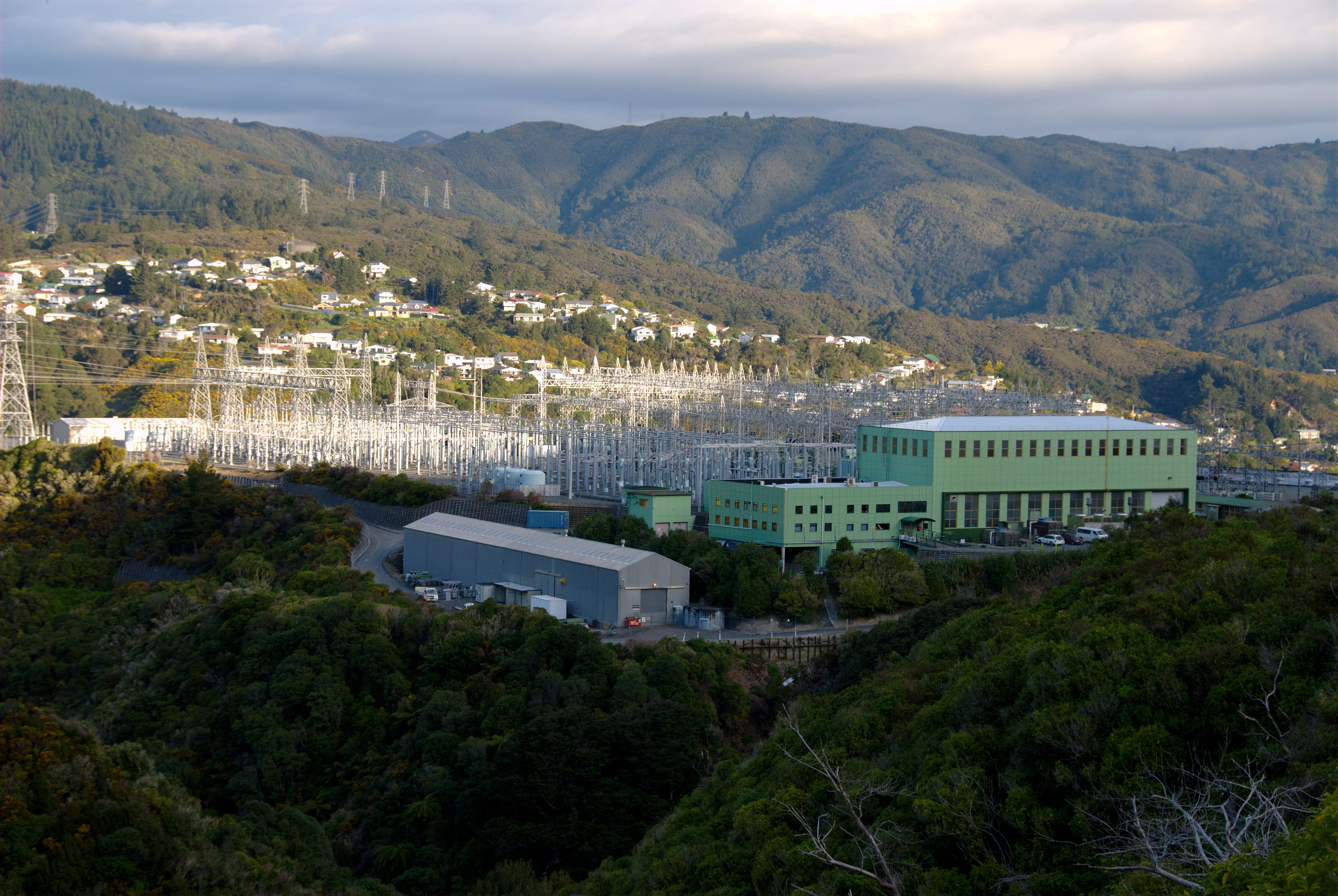
- Haywards electrical substation

- Coordinates: 41°08′57″S 174°58′43″E
- Country: New Zealand
- City: Lower Hutt City
- Electoral ward: Western

Area
  - Land: 73 ha (180 acres)

Population (2023 census)
  - Total: 96
  - Density: 130/km^{2} (340/sq mi)

	Judgeford	Heretaunga
	Haywards	Silverstream
Kelson	Manor Park

Haywards is a small hillside suburb in the Hutt Valley near Wellington, New Zealand. It is notable for its large electrical substation, which is the main switching point for the Wellington region, and the home of the North Island converter station for the HVDC Inter-Island, which links the North and South Island electricity networks together.

== History ==
Haywards railway station was opened on 15 December 1875, along with Belmont railway station. It was closed in 1954 and replaced by Manor Park railway station.

Haywards was listed in the 1881 New Zealand census as being part of both Mungaroa Riding and Epuni Riding, with a combined population of 58.

== Demographics ==
Haywards covers 0.73 km^{2} (0.28 sq mi). It is part of the Manor Park statistical area.

Historical population
Year	Pop.	±% p.a.
2006	108	—
2013	93	−2.11%
2018	93	+0.00%
2023	96	+0.64%

Haywards had a population of 96 in the 2023 New Zealand census, an increase of 3 people (3.2%) since the 2018 census, and an increase of 3 people (3.2%) since the 2013 census. There were 54 males and 39 females in 42 dwellings. 6.2% of people identified as LGBTIQ+. The median age was 37.0 years (compared with 38.1 years nationally). There were 9 people (9.4%) aged under 15 years, 24 (25.0%) aged 15 to 29, 45 (46.9%) aged 30 to 64, and 15 (15.6%) aged 65 or older.

People could identify as more than one ethnicity. The results were 81.2% European (Pākehā); 9.4% Māori; 9.4% Pasifika; 6.2% Asian; 3.1% Middle Eastern, Latin American and African New Zealanders (MELAA); and 6.2% other, which includes people giving their ethnicity as "New Zealander". English was spoken by 100.0%, Māori by 3.1%, Samoan by 3.1%, and other languages by 6.2%. The percentage of people born overseas was 21.9, compared with 28.8% nationally.

Religious affiliations were 18.8% Christian, 3.1% Islam, and 9.4% other religions. People who answered that they had no religion were 56.2%, and 9.4% of people did not answer the census question.

Of those at least 15 years old, 27 (31.0%) people had a bachelor's or higher degree, 48 (55.2%) had a post-high school certificate or diploma, and 15 (17.2%) people exclusively held high school qualifications. The median income was $53,600, compared with $41,500 nationally. 12 people (13.8%) earned over $100,000 compared to 12.1% nationally. The employment status of those at least 15 was 66 (75.9%) full-time and 3 (3.4%) part-time.

== Transport ==
State Highway 58 is the primary route from the Hutt Valley to Pāuatahanui and Porirua. It leaves State Highway 2 at Haywards. This highway was first built during the 1870s. From the 1940s to the 1970s there were proposals for a railway line, the Haywards–Plimmerton Line, via this route.

In June 2010, the results of a road assessment programme indicated that the Haywards Hill road was amongst the worst in the Wellington region, scoring only 2 out a possible 5. Construction of a new elevated interchange at the intersection of SH2 and SH58 at Haywards began in 2015 including a new carpark and footbridge across SH2 to Manor Park, and was completed in 2017. Further safety improvements to SH58 are under construction and estimated to be complete by 2023. These include building median and road-side safety barriers, roundabouts at dangerous road intersections and widening parts of the road to four lanes.

== Electrical substation and HVDC converter plant ==
The Haywards electrical substation is one of national grid operator Transpower's largest substations and is a key part of New Zealand's national electricity network. The North Island converter station for the HVDC Inter-Island link is co-sited with the main HVAC substation, and converts the ±350 kV direct current electricity transmitted from the South Island converter station at Benmore to 220 kV alternating current for the North Island, and vice versa.

220 kV to 110 kV interconnecting transformers at Haywards supply the regional 110 kV network that serves much of the Wellington Region. Supply transformers at Haywards step down voltage to 33 kV and 11 kV and provide a connection to the Wellington Electricity subtransmission and distribution network serving the central-north Hutt Valley, from Trentham in the north to Taita in the south. 220 kV lines connect Haywards to the Wilton substation to supply central Wellington City, and north to Bunnythorpe near Palmerston North to connect with the rest of the North Island grid.
