= Frederic Whiting (painter) =

English painter (1872–1962)

RP RSW RI Frederic Whiting
- Born: 1872; Hampstead, London, England
- Died: 1 August 1962 (aged 89–90); Coulsdon, England
- Known for: Painting

Frederic Whiting RP RSW RI (1872 – 1 August 1962) was an English painter who had studied at the Académie Julian and taught at Heatherley School of Fine Art with Iain Macnab and Bernard Adams. His work was part of the painting event in the art competition at the 1948 Summer Olympics. He also worked for The Graphic as a war correspondent, covering the Chinese and Russo-Japanese War.

== Sources ==
- 15 artworks by or after Frederic Whiting at the Art UK site
