= 1892 City of Wellington by-election =

New Zealand by-election

- 15 January 1892
- Turnout: 75.50%
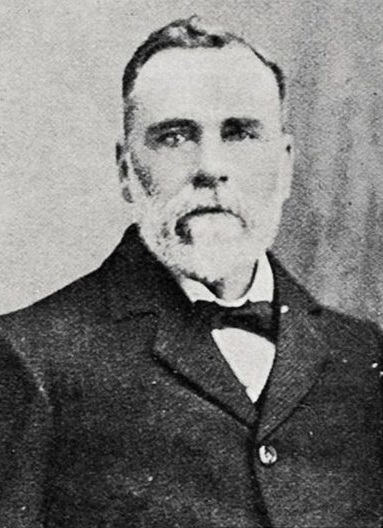

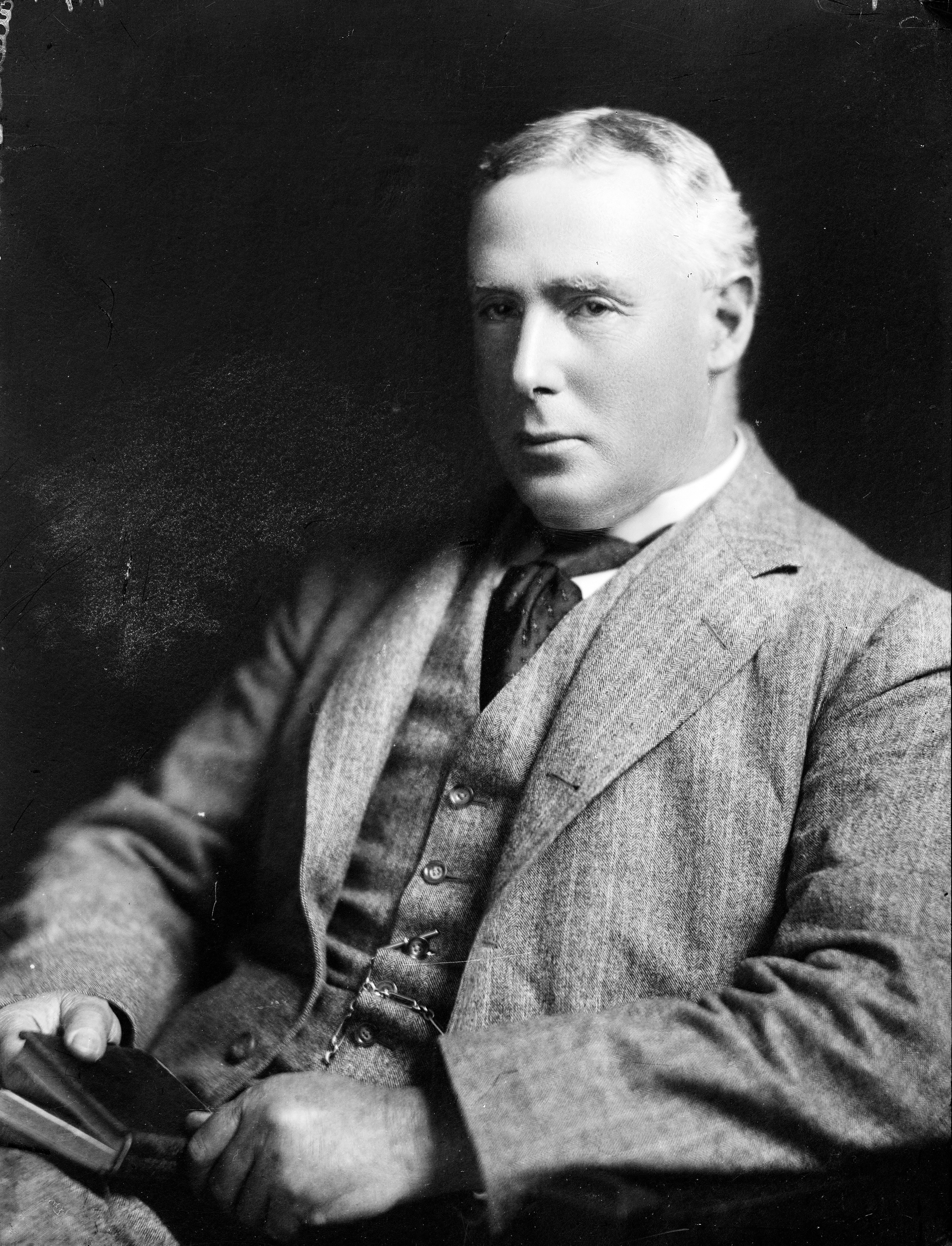
Candidate	William McLean	Francis Bell
Party	Liberal	Conservative
Popular vote	3,388	3,245
Percentage	51.08%	48.92%
MP before election
Kennedy Macdonald
Liberal
Elected MP
William McLean
Liberal

The City of Wellington by-election of 1892 was a by-election held on 15 January 1892 during the 11th New Zealand Parliament in the urban seat of the City of Wellington.

== Background ==
The election was triggered due to the resignation of sitting Member Kennedy Macdonald amidst a bankruptcy claim. The contest was won by William McLean of the Liberal Party. McLean narrowly beat the conservative Francis Bell by 3,388 votes to 3,245.

The election was marred by a scandal over double voting. Over twenty cases of people casting votes more than once were discovered in a subsequent investigation. In his congratulatory speech to McLean, Prime Minister John Ballance also made reference to the scandal, alleging that the Tory Party had brought in outsiders to vote who had long ceased to be residents in the electorate.

== Results ==
The following table gives the election results:

1892 City of Wellington by-election
Party	Candidate	Votes	%	±%
Liberal	William McLean	3,388	51.08	+30.97
Conservative	Francis Bell	3,245	48.92	+5.31
Majority		143	2.16	−1.32
Turnout		6,633	75.50	+15.49
Registered electors		8,786		

McLean held the seat until the 1893 general election, when he was defeated. Bell won a seat in Parliament for the Wellington electorate in 1893 and would go on to become Prime Minister more than three decades later. Macdonald was cleared of his bankruptcy charges but was not re-elected in 1893. He was later appointed to the Legislative Council in 1903.
