= Francis Bell (New Zealand politician) =

Prime minister of New Zealand in 1925

The Right Honourable Sir Francis Bell GCMG KC
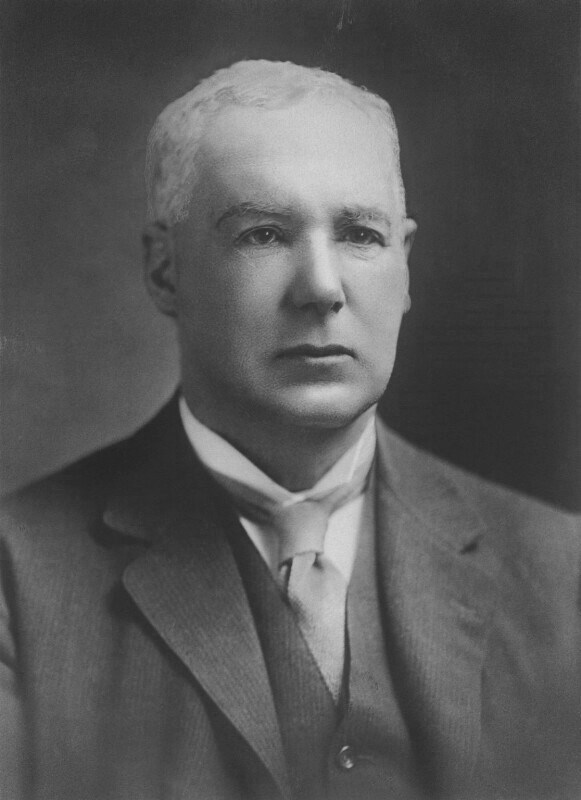
- Bell c. 1924

20th Prime Minister of New Zealand
- In office 14 May 1925 – 30 May 1925
- Monarch: George V
- Governor-General: Charles Fergusson
- Preceded by: William Massey
- Succeeded by: Gordon Coates
- Constituency: None (Legislative Councillor)

11th Mayor of Wellington
- In office 1891–1893
- Preceded by: Arthur Winton Brown
- Succeeded by: Alfred Brandon
- In office 1896–1897
- Preceded by: George Fisher
- Succeeded by: John Rutherfurd Blair

Personal details
- Born: 31 March 1851 Nelson, New Zealand
- Died: 13 March 1936 (aged 84) Wellington, New Zealand
- Party: Reform
- Spouse(s): Caroline Robinson, Lady Bell (m. 1878; died 1935)
- Children: 8, including: Cheviot Bell; William Bell; Beatrice Enid Bell; Violet Bell
- Parent(s): Sir Dillon Bell; Margaret (Hort), Lady Bell
- Relatives: Arthur Bell (brother); Brenda Bell (niece)

Sir Francis Henry Dillon Bell GCMG PC KC (31 March 1851 – 13 March 1936) was a New Zealand lawyer and politician who served as the 20th prime minister of New Zealand from 14 to 30 May 1925. He was the first New Zealand-born prime minister, holding office in a caretaker capacity following the death of William Massey.

The second Jewish person to become prime minister, Bell was born in Nelson. His father, Sir Dillon Bell, was also a politician. Bell attended the Church of England Grammar School in Auckland and Otago Boys' High School before going on to St John's College, Cambridge. He returned to New Zealand to practise law, settling in Wellington and eventually becoming president of the New Zealand Law Society. Bell served as Mayor of Wellington from 1891 to 1893 and from 1896 to 1897. He was elected to the House of Representatives in 1893, after two previous defeats, but served only a single term before retiring in 1896 to return to the legal profession.

In 1912, Bell was appointed to the Legislative Council as a representative of the Reform Party. In the Reform Government under William Massey, he served as Minister of Internal Affairs (1912–1915), Minister of Immigration (1912–1920), Attorney-General (1918–1926), Minister of Health (1919–1920), and Minister of External Affairs (1923–1926). When Massey died in office in 1925, Bell – aged 74 – was commissioned as his replacement for 16 days while the party elected a new leader (Gordon Coates). Bell retired from politics the following year. Only Henry Sewell served a shorter term as prime minister, and only Walter Nash served as prime minister at a greater age.

== Early life ==
Bell was born in Nelson, the eldest son of Sir Dillon Bell. His mother was Margaret Hort (who was Jewish, but became a Christian). Arthur Bell was a younger brother. He attended the Church of England Grammar School and Otago Boys' High School. At Otago Boys he was the Dux. After finishing high school, he travelled to England where he attended St John's College, Cambridge, receiving a BA in 1873. On returning to New Zealand, he began practising law in Wellington, being involved in Bell, Gully, MacKenzie and Evans. As a youth in the 1870s, he also played two first-class cricket matches for Wellington.

Bell served as Crown Solicitor in Wellington from 1878 to 1890, and from 1902 to 1910. He was a prominent member of both the local and national law societies. He served as the latter's president from 1901 to 1918.

He married Caroline Robinson on 24 April 1878 at St John's Church in Christchurch. She was the third daughter of William Robinson. They had four daughters and four sons. His son William Henry Dillon Bell (1884–1917) was a Member of Parliament, but resigned and volunteered for service in World War I. He was killed in 1917. Another son Cheviot Bell was appointed to the Legislative Council as a member of the suicide squad by the First National Government on 27 July 1950 to vote for the abolition of the council, so served to 31 December 1950.

His niece and nephew, by his brother Alfred, Brenda and Frank Bell, became notable radio pioneers.

== Political career ==
New Zealand Parliament
Years	Term	Electorate	Party
1893–1896	12th	Wellington	Independent

His political career began with being elected Mayor of Wellington in 1891, 1892 and 1896. In his first general election in 1890, he was defeated running as an independent for the City of Wellington electorate. He was narrowly defeated by William McLean in an 1892 by-election by 3388 votes to 3245. He finally entered Parliament in the 1893 election, serving for one term.

In 1912, the Reform Party came to power, and on 10 July 1912 Bell was appointed to the Legislative Council. He became Minister of Internal Affairs (1912–1915), and Minister of Immigration (1912–1920). He was Attorney-General (1918–1926). He was the first Commissioner of State Forests, and from 1923 he would also serve as the Minister of External Affairs.

He represented New Zealand at the League of Nations in 1922. He would also attend the allied conferences at Genoa and the Hague.

Having been appointed a Knight Commander of the Order of St Michael and St George on 3 June 1915, Bell was promoted to Knight Grand Cross of the same order in the 1923 New Year Honours. He was appointed to the Privy Council on 1 February 1926.

== Prime minister ==
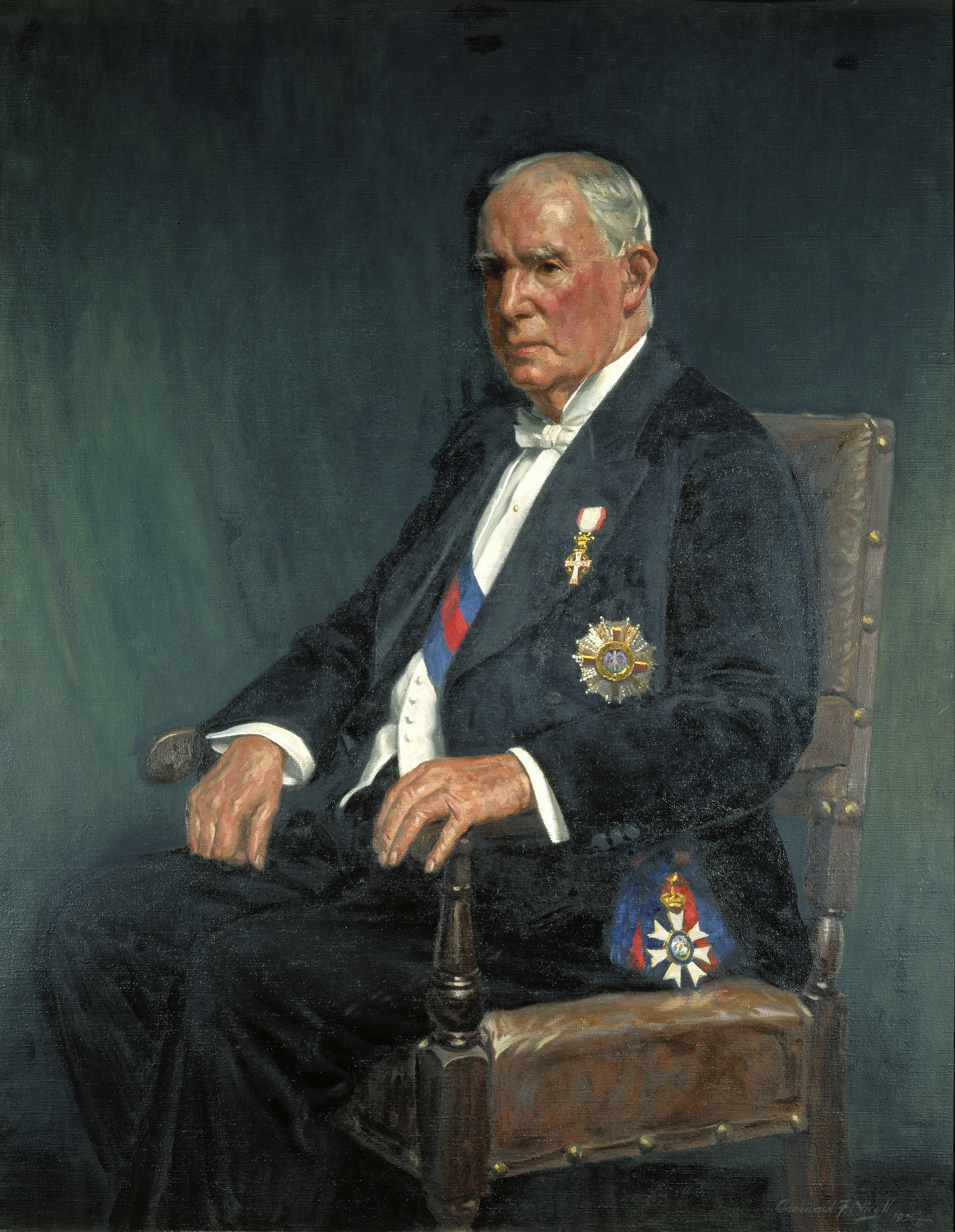
Portrait of Bell, wearing his insignia of knighthood, 1935

On returning to New Zealand, Bell became acting prime minister while William Massey was in London. Massey's health began to fail, and Bell took over most of his roles. He officially became prime minister on 14 May 1925 after Massey's death on 10 May. He served as prime minister for the next 16 days. Bell declined the party's offer to become prime minister and was replaced by Gordon Coates.

After giving up his portfolios in 1926, he returned to the League of Nations with Coates.

In 1935, he was awarded the King George V Silver Jubilee Medal.

== Death and legacy ==
Bell's wife, Caroline (born 1853), died in Wellington on 8 September 1935. Bell died in Wellington on 13 March 1936.

Bell Road in Wellington is named after him.

== Notes ==
Government offices
Preceded by William Massey	Prime Minister of New Zealand; 1925	Succeeded by Gordon Coates
Political offices
Preceded by Arthur Winton Brown	Mayor of Wellington; 1892–1893 1897	Succeeded by Alfred Brandon
Preceded by George Fisher	Mayor of Wellington; 1892–1893 1897	Succeeded by John Blair
Preceded by Alexander Herdman	Attorney-General; 1918–1926	Succeeded by William Downie Stewart
Preceded by Josiah Hanan	Minister of Education; 1919–1920	Succeeded by James Parr
Preceded by George Russell	Minister of Public Health; 1919–1920	Succeeded by James Parr
Preceded by Ernest Lee	Minister of Justice; 1923	Succeeded by James Parr
Preceded by Ernest Lee	Minister of Police; 1923	Succeeded by James Parr
New Zealand Parliament
Preceded by George Fisher, William McLean, John Duthie	Member of Parliament for Wellington; 1893–1896; Served alongside: Robert Stout, John Duthie	Succeeded by George Fisher, Robert Stout, John Hutcheson
