= Arthur Bell (engineer) =

New Zealand engineer (1856–1943)

Arthur Wilbraham Dillon Bell (4 April 1856 – 29 May 1943) was a civil engineer active in New Zealand and Western Australia. Bell was a son of Francis Dillon Bell; his father was at the time of his birth a member of the New Zealand House of Representatives. His elder brother, Francis Bell, would later be Prime Minister of New Zealand. Bell received his secondary schooling in New Zealand and after a time in journalism and as a public servant, he went to England to train as an engineer. After a short period of engineering work in England, he returned to New Zealand in 1879, and in 1891 he went to Western Australia. He retired young in 1907 and returned to live in New Zealand. In 1917, the Bells moved to Melbourne to be with their daughter's family.

== Early life ==
Bell was born on 4 April 1856 in Parnell, Auckland, to Margaret Joachim Bell, née Hort, and Francis Dillon Bell. His father was a land surveyor in New Zealand, sent out by his cousin Edward Gibbon Wakefield to help with the settling of New Zealand in September 1842. Arthur was his fifth child, part of a family of six brothers and one surviving sister. He was educated at Christ's College in Christchurch and at sixteen gained a senior scholarship. At eighteen he left school and began acting as secretary to his father, who was then Speaker of the House of Representatives, and in his spare time did free-lance journalism for The Wellington Independent, making three hundred pounds a year. Bell also spent a short time in the civil service.

Like several members of his family he went "home" to England for the grounding of his new career. He was apprenticed to the British engineer Sir John Hawkshaw. In 1877 he ‘received back his articles’ and was made Assistant Engineer to the York and Lancaster Railway.

== Career in New Zealand ==
In 1879, on hearing of proposed large extensions to public works in New Zealand, Bell returned home and took up the position of Assistant Engineer in Otago, working on railway lines, roads, bridges, harbours and waterworks, and living in Dunedin.

In 1881 and 1882 Bell did surveying work for the Picton-Hurunui Railway and at the end of 1882 he became responsible for all classes of work in Dunedin. While there, Bell met Catherine Emily "Katie" Hughes, the second daughter of W. Kersey Hughes of Victoria in Australia. On 2 April 1887 they were married at All Saints' Church in Dunedin. In 1888 their only child, a daughter, Rena Dillon, was born.

From 1884 Bell worked mostly on defence works, and in these years he and his family moved to Wellington, where he became Resident Engineer, his work including harbour fortifications. He subsequently became engineer for defences for the colony, including submarine mining defence. New Zealand authorities at that time were beginning to realise how vulnerable the country was to invasion, and were particularly alarmed about the possibility of Russian aggression.

Later Bell also took on the role of engineer with regard to public buildings and had charge of the designing and construction of a number of important public buildings in New Zealand. In 1890 he was elected a member of the Institute of Civil Engineering. As a member of a commission to look into such matters, he also had a hand in the building of a complete system of sewerage and drainage for Wellington City Council.

== Career in Western Australia ==
After a dispute with the authorities about his status and pay, a dispute in which he was supported by Lieutenant-Colonel F. J. Fox, Bell resigned from his engineering positions in New Zealand and accepted a position in West Australia.

Bell's appointment came about through the suggestion and support of C. Y. O'Connor, a prominent engineer in New Zealand at that time. O'Connor was born and trained in Ireland, and migrated to New Zealand as a young man where he worked first as a surveyor. At the early age of 29 he became district engineer for Canterbury Province and eight years later he took up the position of inspecting engineer for the South Island. By the time Bell moved to West Australia, O'Connor and he had worked together for some ten years and the two became friends. By 1891 O'Connor, like Bell, had become dissatisfied with his treatment by his superiors and accepted the position of Chief Engineer in West Australia, offered by John Forrest, the Premier. The Australian Dictionary of Biography describes Forrest and O'Connor thus: "Both were big men, O'Connor, lithe and athletic; at over six feet (180 cm), he was slightly the taller. Both had known the toughening experience of surveyors working in unexplored places. O'Connor was the more sensitive, with wide and cultivated tastes and a passionate sense of justice for men of all degree." He was charged by Forrest with the responsibility for all engineering initiatives in the state, and was also made manager of the railways.

In 1892 and 1893 huge numbers of people were rushing to unearth the newly discovered gold at Coolgardie and Kalgoorlie in the distant east of West Australia. O'Connor became responsible for the supply of water to the miners, water not just for domestic needs but also considerable supplies for the extraction of gold; very difficult in these arid regions.

By 1895 O'Connor had produced a plan to supply water to Coolgardie. of whom Bell must have been one.

The plan for supplying the goldfields with water involved creating a reservoir west of the Darling Range by damming the Helena River, a short distance inland from Perth. This was to be the Mundaring Weir. The water had to be lifted 1,000 feet (300 m) over the escarpment east of the reservoir, and pumped some 530 kilometres (330 mi) across the inland plateau into a reservoir at Coolgardie. It was to take three years and cost 2.5 million pounds (over 5.5 billion in today's values). To do this Forrest had to convince parliament of the feasibility of the plan and of the necessity of raising an enormous loan in London. By 1898 the first contracts, for piping, were going through.

Bell took up the positions of inspecting engineer and chief assistant to O'Connor, there being no Assistant Engineer-in-Chief position at that time, a position he held from May 1893 until December 1896. A eulogy about him published in The Morning Herald on his retirement and imminent return to New Zealand stated that he was "... practically assistant engineer-in-chief through the exceptionally busy period in this state from 1894 to 1897, when the West was beginning to feel the full force of the boom consequent upon the rich gold discoveries." After surveying in the goldfields he was involved in special constructions for them such as roads, railways and bridges. He worked also on the harbour in Fremantle, and then in the works at the Mundaring Weir. He also, as in New Zealand, held the office of superintendent of public buildings, from 1897 to 1902.

After controversy attached to the Coolgardie plan, Forrest resigned in 1901 to join the new Federal parliament. There followed a series of unstable governments in West Australia and O'Connor encountered criticism from the parliament and the press. The eulogy to O'Connor in the Herald described the end of these events:

O'Connor's confidence in his scheme was vindicated on 8 March 1902 by a successful preliminary pumping test of six miles (9.7 km) of the water main over the most difficult part of the route. That evening one small leak was discovered near Chidlow's Well. He arranged to accompany the engineer in charge of construction to the site on Monday. That morning, 10 March 1902, he prepared for his customary early ride but his usual companion, his youngest daughter, was unwell. He rode alone along the Fremantle beach past the new harbour, then south to Robb Jetty, where he rode his horse into the sea. His deft revolver shot ended his life.

He had left a note: 'The Coolgardie Scheme is alright and I could finish it if I got a chance and protection from misrepresentation but there is no hope of that now and it is better that it should be given to some entirely new man to do who will be untrammelled by prior responsibility'.

By the end of 1902 the work was successfully completed. After the death of O'Connor the Public Works Department was reorganised and Bell was moved to the office of principal engineer for harbours and rivers, "... in which capacity he... controlled a number of very important marine engineering undertakings along the extensive seaboard of the State." These were the completion of works at Fremantle Harbour, including extending the quays, installing the shed and cranes, designing a graving dock, and preparing for future expansion. Bell also worked on land reclamations on the sea front and the building of a swing bridge to North Fremantle; and the reclamation of the Swan River foreshore at Perth. He also designed and supervised works on harbours at Bunbury and Albany and along the north west coast, and designed and constructed all the lighthouses on the coast. In 1901 he had been in addition made acting engineer for railway construction.

The family returned to New Zealand later that year and settled in Auckland, in Arney Road.

== Family and death ==
On 21 February 1917, his daughter married Norman Robert Mackintosh at St. Paul's Cathedral in Wellington. Her husband was the New Zealand manager of the Sun Fire Insurance. The reception was held at her uncle's place—Francis Bell—who was at the time a member of the New Zealand Legislative Council. In 1921 he and his wife followed their daughter to Melbourne where she had moved with her husband and two daughters. Arthur Bell died on 29 May 1943 at Caulfield West, a suburb of Melbourne, aged 87 years. Catherine Bell died on 9 May 1946 in Toorak, Victoria.
