= William Henry Dillon Bell =

New Zealand politician (1884–1917)

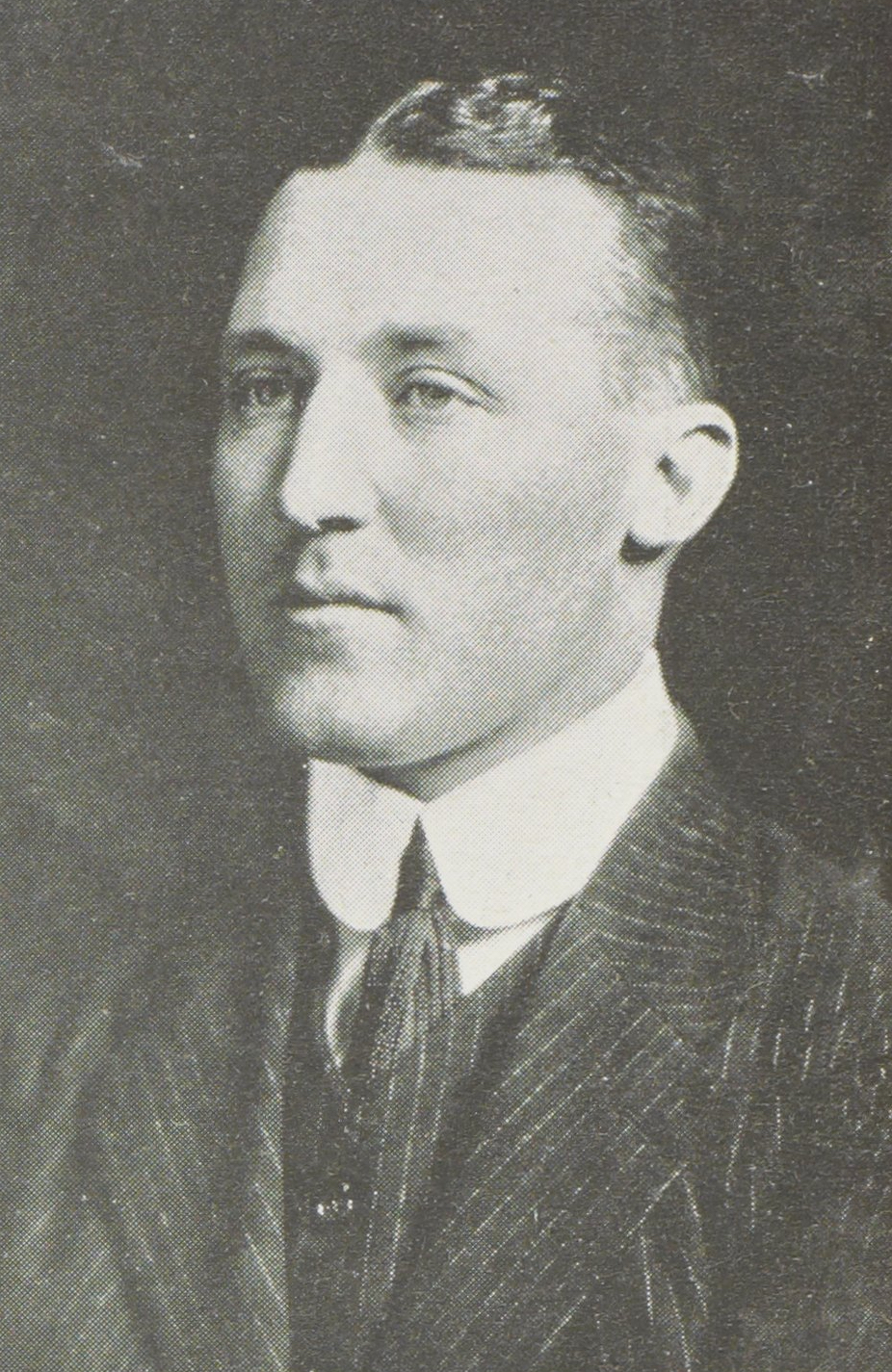
William Henry Dillon Bell, c. 1911

New Zealand Parliament
Years	Term	Electorate	Party
1911–1914	18th	Wellington Suburbs and Country	Reform

William Henry Dillon Bell (1 March 1884 – 31 July 1917) was a Reform Party Member of Parliament in New Zealand.

He won the Wellington Suburbs and Country seat in the 1911 general election, and held it to 1914, when he retired and volunteered for service in World War I. He served in the Samoa Expeditionary Force, and was killed in action in Belgium on 31 July 1917 as a Captain with a King's regiment, the 1st King Edward's Horse.

He was a son of Sir Francis Bell, a Reform Party leader and later the first New Zealand-born Prime Minister.
