= 1842 Wellington mayoral election =

Local election and first election in New Zealand

- 3 October 1842
- Turnout: 837 (93%)
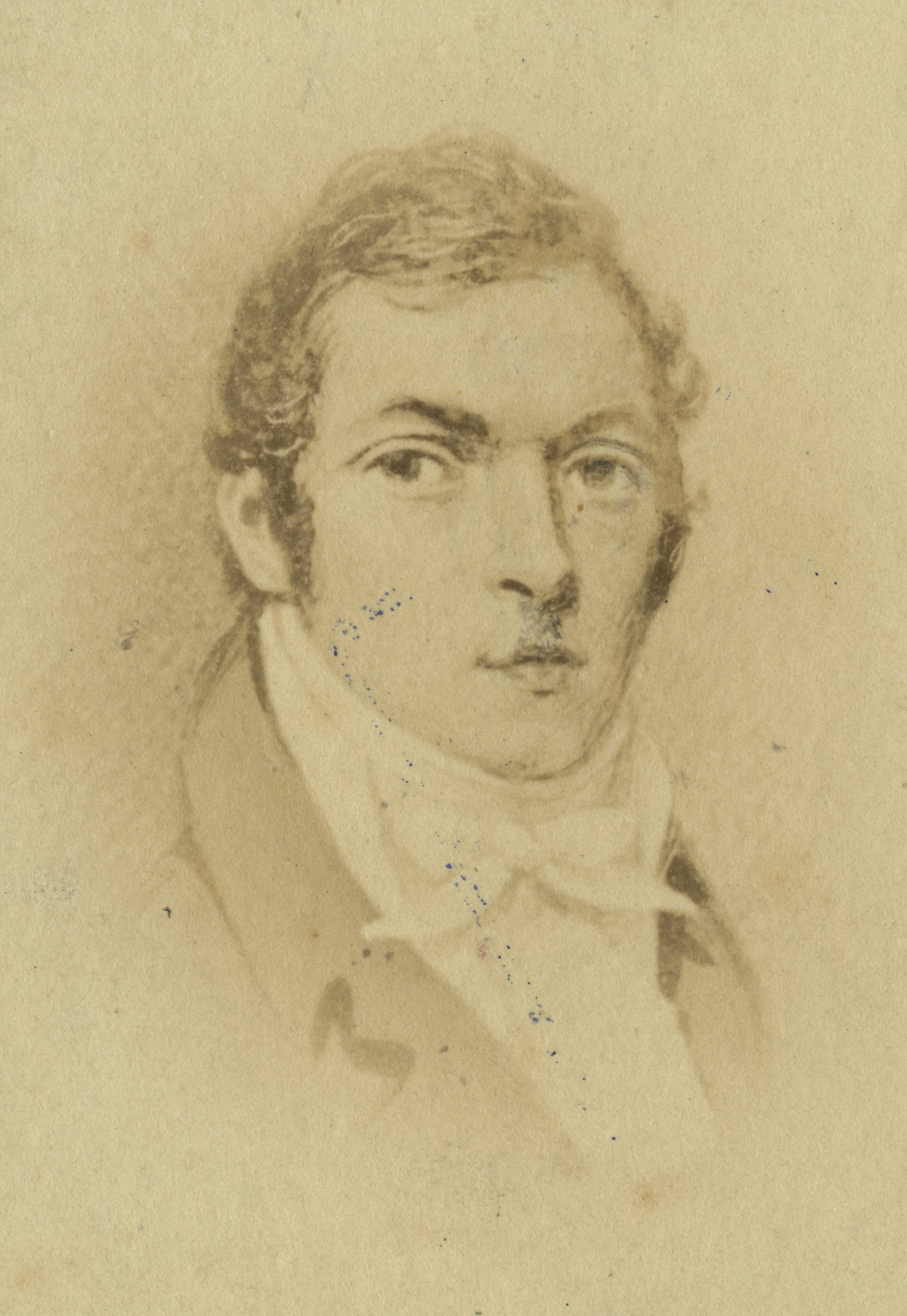
Candidate	George Hunter
Party	Independent
Popular vote	273
Percentage	32.61
Mayor before election
None
Elected mayor
George Hunter

The 1842 Wellington mayoral election was the first election ever held in New Zealand. It was held to elect a mayor and eleven member council. The mayor was not elected separately, with the position awarded to the highest polling council candidate.

== Background ==
A public meeting was held on 29 July 1841 in Barrett's Hotel locals resolved to establish local government as a way of providing direct leadership to the city as well as lessening the amount of colonial government rule in the area. Subsequently, hundreds of settlers of all classes worked out the wording of an ordinance for local government at a series of pub meetings. In August 1841 William Hobson, the Governor of New Zealand, visited Wellington and heard the complaints of settlers and magistrates. He was also presented the document and passed it into law the following year, giving birth to local government in New Zealand. At the end of May 1842 Wellington was declared New Zealand's first incorporated borough after meeting the requisite population of more than 2,000 (the first place in the colony to do so). An elected council of twelve burgesses (including a mayor) was to be established and charged with the administration of public lands within its boundaries. It also had the power to make by-laws, raise loans, carry out public works and levy property taxes (rates) on all proprietors and occupiers. Any adult male could vote but had to pay a £1 registration fee, excluding many potential voters. The population at the time was around 3,500, with about 900 adult men eligible to vote.

Each voter was entitled to vote for as many or as few candidates as they wished with the twelve highest polling candidates to become Aldermen, while the remaining six were to form a reserve list from which any vacancies on the council were to be filled until the next election held. During February 1842, meetings were held at public houses to determine election 'tickets'. Both a "working men's" committee and a "gentlemen's" committee were established. Each nominated eighteen, but seven of them were on both lists. Five candidates who appeared on both lists, three from each list, and one independent were elected to the Municipal Council of the Borough of Wellington. George Hunter topped the poll with the highest number of votes and automatically became the first Mayor of Wellington. There was a high amount of public interest and engagement with 93 percent of those enrolled voting.

== Election results ==
The following table gives the election results:

1842 Wellington council election
Party	Candidate	Votes	%	±%
Independent	George Hunter	273	32.61	
Independent	William Lyon	237	28.31	
Independent	William Fitzherbert	220	26.28	
Independent	Johnny Wade	212	25.32	
Independent	George Scott	196	23.41	
Independent	Francis Alexander Molesworth	182	21.74	
Independent	John Dorset	176	21.02	
Independent	Robert Waitt	164	19.59	
Independent	William Guyton	155	18.51	
Independent	Abraham Hort	155	18.51	
Independent	Edward Johnson	151	18.04	
Independent	Robert Jenkins	149	17.80	
Independent	John Howard Wallace	144	17.20	
Independent	Richard Davis Hanson	126	15.05	
Independent	William Anthony Cooper	125	14.93	
Independent	Edward Daniell	124	14.81	
Independent	Thomas Milne Machattie	122	14.57	
Independent	Henry Taylor	117	13.97	
Turnout		837	93.00	

== Aftermath ==
Hunter led the city for nine months where the appointment of council committees, employees and organising finances were his main tasks. During a council meeting in July 1843, Hunter caught a chill and died at his Willis Street home a few days later. At a council meeting on 26 July, John Howard Wallace, the highest polling man on the reserve list, was appointed to the council to replace Hunter as an Alderman. The council then elected William Guyton to replace him as Mayor.
