= Henry Godfrey =

Henry Godfrey may refer to:

- Henry Godfrey (academic) (1781–1832), English clergyman and academic, President of Queens' College, Cambridge
- Henry Godfrey (pioneer) (1824–1882), pioneer and settler of Victoria, Australia
- Henry Ronald Godfrey (1887–1968), English motor car design engineer
