= George Hunter (mayor) =

Mayor of Wellington from 1842 to 1843

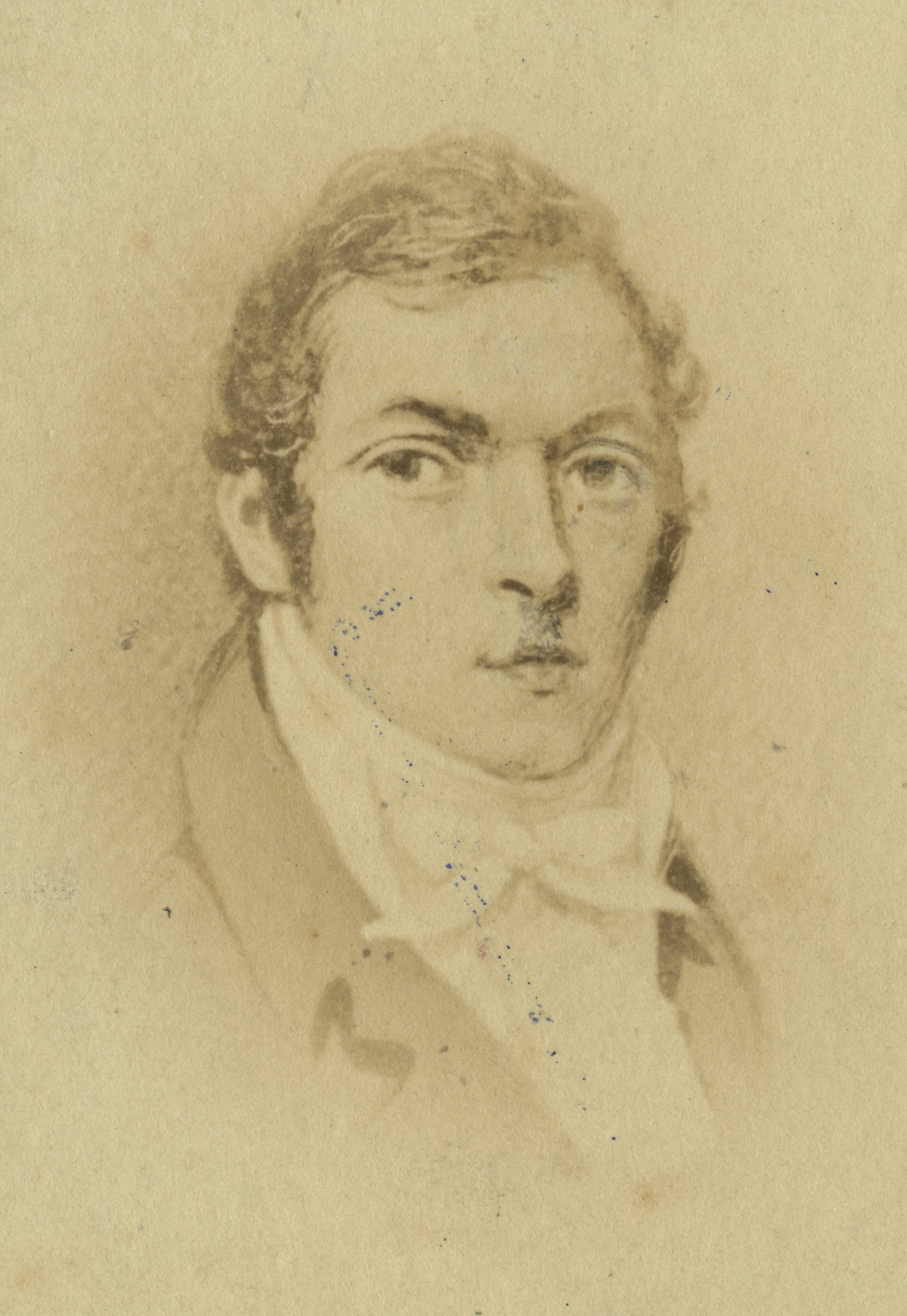
- George Hunter in c. 1840

1st Mayor of Wellington
- In office 3 October 1842 – 19 July 1843
- Succeeded by: William Guyton

Personal details
- Born: 1788 McDuff Parish, Banffshire, Scotland
- Died: 19 July 1843 (aged 54–55) Wellington, New Zealand
- Resting place: Bolton Street Cemetery
- Relations: George Hunter (grandson)
- Children: George Hunter

George Hunter, JP (1788 – 19 July 1843) was the first mayor of Wellington, New Zealand, in 1842–43. He was also the first mayor in New Zealand.

== Family ==
Born in McDuff Parish, Banffshire, Scotland he came to Wellington in the ship Duke of Roxburgh in 1840, with his wife Helen, six daughters and four sons. Hunter's wife was the daughter of David Souter, Chief Factor to the Right Honorable James Duff, 4th Earl Fife.

He was described by Mary Swainson as having a bald head, circular spectacles and beaming eyes, and as exactly resembling Mr Pickwick of Charles Dickens The Pickwick Papers. He was one of the founders of the Pickwick Club in Wellington.

Shortly after his arrival, Hunter asked Samuel Parnell, a carpenter he had met on the ship, to build him a store on Lambton Quay, to which Parnell agreed, provided he only worked eight hours a day, the beginning of the Eight Hour Day in New Zealand. As there were only three carpenters in Wellington, Hunter reluctantly agreed to this condition.

Hunter's eldest son, George Hunter and his grandson Sir George Hunter were both Members of Parliament. His great-great-great granddaughter Irvine Yardley was a Wellington City Councillor from 1974 to 1979.

== Business interests ==
Prior to coming to New Zealand, Hunter had worked for a major mercantile establishment in Aberdeen. He moved to London, where he worked as a merchant until leaving in 1839 for New Zealand with the New Zealand Company.

He was in business on Willis Street with Kenneth Bethune as general and shipping merchants, and lived in Tinakori Road, where Premier House was later built. Hunter was the Storemaster-General of the New Zealand Company In April 1840 he was appointed as a director of the Wellington Branch of the Union Bank of Australia. In 1841 Hunter was appointed to the Committee of the New Zealand Flax Association.

== Civic duty ==
Hunter's first appointment to public office in Wellington was as a member of the Management Committee of the Port Nicholson Exchange Room and Public Library. He was one of the first Justices of the Court in Wellington, which was founded in October 1841, having been appointed a Justice of the Peace some time earlier. Hunter was also involved in creating regulations for managing Wellington Harbour.

With the passing of the Municipal Corporation Bill in 1842, Wellington was able to elect its own mayor and aldermen. On 3 October 1842, Hunter, with the most votes of the 12 aldermen elected to the new Wellington Borough, was declared elected. Initial business of the Council was the appointment of officers and organising its finances.

In 1843, while attending a meeting to express sympathy for the victims of the Wairau Affray he caught a chill and died a few days later. His funeral was a significant one, attended by both local Māori and Pākehā alike. He was buried at Bolton Street Cemetery.

He was succeeded as mayor by William Guyton.

Political offices
New title	Mayor of Wellington; 1842 – 1843	Succeeded by William Guyton
