= Duke of Roxburgh (ship) =

History

United Kingdom
- Name: Duke of Roxburgh
- Builder: T. & W. Smith, St Peter's, Newcastle upon Tyne, for Green and Wigram
- Launched: 3 June 1828
- Fate: Wrecked 1864

General characteristics
- Type: Barque
- Tons burthen: 417, or 4177/94 (bm)
- Length: 113 ft 8 in (34.6 m)
- Beam: 28 ft 10 in (8.8 m)
- Propulsion: Sail
- Crew: 24
- Notes: Yellow metal sheathing (1839)

Duke of Roxburgh was launched in 1828 at Newcastle upon Tyne. Initially she traded with India, but later she often sailed between Great Britain and her Australasian colonies carrying emigrants. She was wrecked in 1864.

== Career ==
Initially, Duke of Roxburgh traded with India. The Register of Shipping (1829) gives her master as Brown, her owner as Pirie and Co., and her trade as London – Madras.

Duke of Roxburgh was one of the earliest immigrant ships to Port Phillip, South Australia, and New Zealand. Her owner in 1840 was J.Somes, changing to Collard, and her master was Drainer.

She left London on 12 April 1838 and arrived at Kingscote on 24 July and Holdfast Bay, South Australia on 28 July. She was carrying 84 passengers (65 adults and 19 children).

Then on 5 October 1839 she sailed from Plymouth to Wellington under James Thomson, master. At Stephen's Island Thomson fell overboard and drowned. The mate, Mr. Leslie, brought Duke of Roxburgh into Port Nicholson, where she arrived on 7 February 1840. This voyage to Wellington made her the third migrant ship to arrive there. On board were 80 male migrants, including George Hunter, Samuel Duncan Parnell, Hart Udy and family (whose son also named Hart Udy was a Mayor of Greytown and a rugby player for New Zealand), William Lyon, and 87 female migrants.

On 1 August 1841, she again left London, stopping at Cork on 1 September and then arriving at Sydney on 10 January 1842. On board were 105 male and 142 female passengers, predominantly migrants.

On 7 May 1843, Duke, as she was affectionately known to crew and passengers, sailed under Captain Collard from England with Francis Russell Nixon, the first Anglican Bishop of Tasmania, his wife and family, and Archdeacon Fitzherbert Marriott, together with six other cabin passenger including John Helder Wedge and the future squatter Henry Godfrey. Sailing via Trindade, Ascension Island, and Cape Colony, Duke reached Hobart Town, Van Diemen’s Land, on 21 July 1843. On 7 December 1843 she was at the Hobart Regatta, her rigging gaily decorated with flags and signals. She left Hobart Town the following January and arrived at Gravesend on 5 June 1844.

Duke of Roxburgh sailed again from Gravesend on 31 October 1846 and arrived at Port Phillip on 7 March 1847. On 12 November Duke of Roxburgh sailed from Sydney with 162 passengers for San Francisco, drawn by the news of the discovery of gold in California.

Under the command of Capt E. Kirsopp, she left Amoy on 16 August 1851 and arrived at Moreton Bay on 8 November 1851, having touched at Ascension Island. Her passengers were 227 Chinese labourers. She departed again on 26 November 1851 for Sydney with passengers Mrs Swift, Miss Douglass, Mrs Gray, Mr Coxen, Mr Issac, Mr McDonald, and Mr R. Moore.

== Fate ==
Duke of Roxburgh was wrecked in 1864.
