= Charles Borlase =

New Zealand politician (1820–1875)

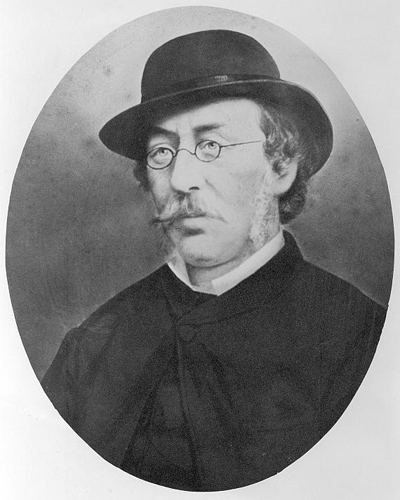

2nd Mayor of Wellington
- In office 8 January 1874 – 28 January 1875
- Preceded by: Joe Dransfield
- Succeeded by: William Sefton Moorhouse

Member of the New Zealand Parliament for City of Wellington
- In office 1 March 1866 – 7 February 1871
- Preceded by: William Barnard Rhodes

Personal details
- Born: 1820 Calcutta, India
- Died: 15 May 1875 (aged 54–55) Wellington, New Zealand
- Occupation: Lawyer

Charles Bonython Borlase (1820 – 15 May 1875) was a New Zealand politician who served as the Mayor of Wellington from 1874 to 1875. He had been a member of the first Wellington Town Board in 1863, and a Councillor to 1874. He held the position of Provincial Solicitor from 1857 until his death in 1875.

== Background ==
Borlase was born in Calcutta, Bengal, India in 1820, although his family was from Cornwall. His father was Lieutenant-Colonel Charles B. Borlase of the Dragoons. He was stationed with the East India Company in India at the time and died just before Borlase was born. The family returned to England, where Borlase studied law and was admitted as a solicitor. For a time he was a law reporter with the London press before becoming a partner in a law firm. Through his families connections with the Molesworth's he migrated with his wife, Elizabeth Emma Borlase (née Holmes), and their three children (Charles, Charlotte, and William) on the Victory to Wellington on 16 August 1848. In the 1850s he moved from Wellington to the Wairarapa clearing land at Papawai. While there he was noted as being both generous and hospitable. In 1858 he returned to live in Wellington. Borlase was also the Judge for the Featherston horse races for a number of years. In Wellington he resumed his legal practice and was legal adviser to the Wellington Building Society.

== Political career ==
New Zealand Parliament
Years	Term	Electorate	Party
1866–1871	4th	City of Wellington	Independent

Borlase was persuaded by Wakefield's Radical Party (called the Rowdies by Featherston's Constitutionalist opponents) to enter politics in 1857. He represented Wairarapa on the Wellington Provincial Council from November 1857 to August 1858, when he was defeated by Captain Smith. He then represented the City of Wellington electorate from March 1859 until his death in May 1875. He was on the Wellington Executive Council from March 1854; the source does not record an end date. He served another period on the Executive Council from June 1866 to June 1868, and was the Provincial Solicitor. In 1866 he represented the City of Wellington in Parliament until 1870. He was defeated in the 1871 election.

== Civic career ==
He had been on the Wellington Town Board and then a Wellington City Councillor. In 1874 he was Mayor until his retirement from the position in December of that year. He continued as a Councillor until his death. Borlase became increasingly ill from February or March 1875 until his death at Wellington on 15 May 1875.

Borlase Street in Wellington is named after him.

== Notes ==
Political offices
Preceded by Joe Dransfield	Mayor of Wellington; 1874–1875	Succeeded by William Sefton Moorhouse
New Zealand Parliament
Preceded by William Barnard Rhodes	Member of Parliament for Wellington City; 1866–1871	Constituency redistricted
