= Samuel Duncan Parnell =

New Zealand activist (1810–1890)

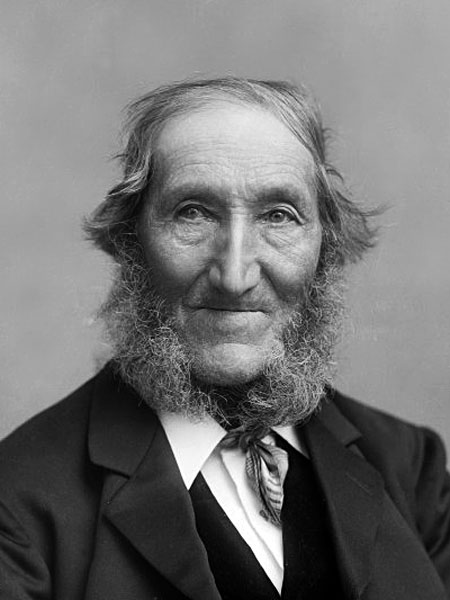
Samuel Duncan Parnell, June 1890

Samuel Duncan Parnell (19 February 1810 – 17 December 1890) was an early New Zealand settler often credited with the establishment of the eight-hour day in New Zealand.

== Early years ==
Parnell was born in London, England, on 19 February 1810, one of nine children (he had seven sisters and one brother) of egg salesman James Parnell and Joan, née Duncan. He trained as carpenter's apprentice until 1834, when he took a job at a joinery on Theobald's Road in London. As carpenters in London routinely worked 12 to 14 hours per day, the problems with such long working days would have been painfully clear to him. Parnell argued about the length of the working day with his colleagues. Around the same time, a Grand National Consolidated Trades Union was being formed, and Parnell asked the union to support the shortening of the working day. The union did not agree, and so Parnell did not join the union, but instead set up his own business.

On 6 September 1839, Parnell married widow Mary Ann Canham, and only eleven days later, the newly wedded couple set off together for New Zealand. For £126, Parnell had secured the boat fare, and the right to 40 hectares (100 acres) of country land, and 4,000 square metres (1 acre) of land in the area then called Port Nicholson and now the city of Wellington, New Zealand. The couple left on the Duke of Roxburgh on 17 September 1839, and landed on Britannia (Petone) Beach on 8 February 1840.

== 1840–1841 ==
Parnell met a shipping agent named George Hunter on board the ship. Soon after arriving in New Zealand, Hunter asked Parnell to build him a store on Lambton Quay. Parnell agreed, on the condition that he would only work eight hours per day. Hunter was initially reluctant, but Parnell argued, now famously, that "we have twenty-four hours per day given us; eight of these should be for work, eight for sleeping, and the remaining eight for recreation and in which for men to do what little things they want for themselves. I am ready to start to-morrow morning at eight o'clock, but it must be on these terms or none at all." (This echoed the famous slogan originated by Robert Owen in 1817: "Eight hours' labour, Eight hours' recreation, Eight hours' rest.") Hunter pointed out how different this was from London, but Parnell replied "We're not in London." However, as there was a severe shortage of skilled workers in New Zealand, Hunter was forced to accept Parnell's terms on the spot.

Parnell greeted ships coming in to Port Nicholson, and told all new migrants not to work more than eight hours a day. In a workers' meeting at October 1840, it was agreed that people should only work eight hours a day, which must be between 8am and 5pm. Anyone accepting less favourable working conditions was to be thrown into the harbour. The eight-hour day was cemented when, in 1841, road-builders in Hutt Valley went on strike after being told to work longer hours.

== 1842–1890 ==
In 1842, his first wife Mary Ann died, and in 1843 Parnell sold his Hutt Valley country land, and started an animal farm in Karori. On 12 December 1851 he married another widow, Sarah Sophia Brunger, with two surviving children.

While a farmer, Parnell still did some carpentry work, and built a home for the local judge.

In October 1873 Parnell returned to Wellington, and lived in Cambridge Terrace. Parnell never had any children of his own, and his second wife died in 1888. The by-then much honoured and respected Parnell died on 17 December 1890. Thousands of people attended his public funeral three days later. He is buried at Bolton Street Memorial Park, and his grave is part of the memorial trail.

== Honorific eponym ==
Samuel Parnell Road in the Wellington suburb of Karori was named in Parnell's honour in 1999. The Auckland suburb of Parnell, established in 1841, is often incorrectly said to have been named after Parnell.
