= Christian Toxward =

New Zealand architect

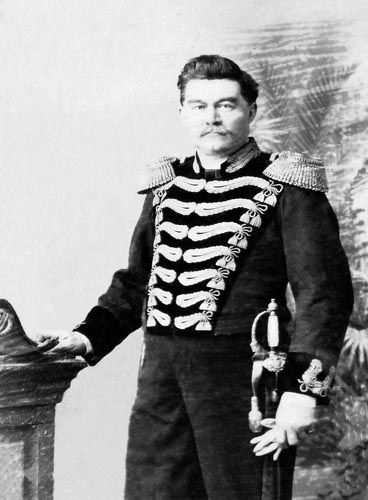
- Toxward in Danish consul uniform, 1870s
- Born: November 26, 1831
- Died: September 30, 1891 (aged 59)
- Citizenship: Naturalised British citizen (1867)
- Occupation(s): Architect, Danish consul, director
- Years active: 1862–1891
- Buildings: Kirkcaldie & Stains, St Mary's Cathedral, Wellington Hospital

Christian Julius Toxward (Note: The Danish spelling of Toxward's surname is Toxvaerd, alternate Anglicised forms such as Toxhead are recorded.) (1831–1891) was a New Zealand architect. He was born in Copenhagen, Denmark in 1831. He is buried at Bolton Street Memorial Park, and his grave is part of the memorial trail. Toxward designed over 200 buildings in the lower North Island from 1866 to his death. Toxward was one of Wellington's most prolific architects through the 1860s to 1870s. Little of Toxward's work today survives but his surviving works have heritage protection.

== Early life ==
Christian Julius Toxward was born 26 November 1831 in Copenhagen, Denmark. Toxward attended the Royal Danish Academy of Fine Arts from 1841 to 1851, but did not receive any qualifications from the institute.

Toxward's obituaries state he spent time in the Victorian goldfields before he arrived in New Zealand but the Royal Institute of British Architects state he worked as a draughtsman in Victoria before working in various locations in Europe.

== New Zealand career ==
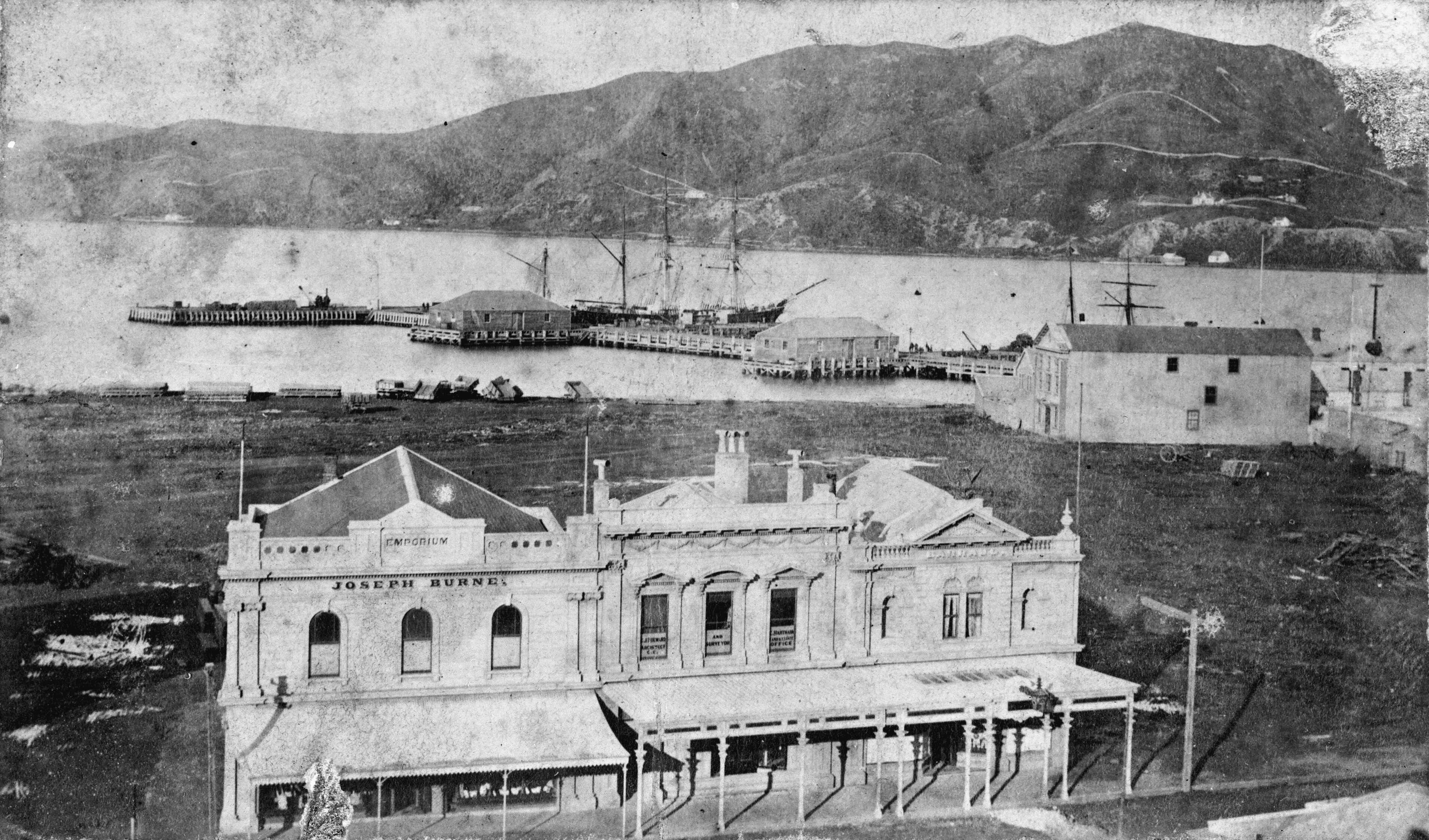
Toxward's office (middle) in Lambton Quay, 1868–1869

It is not known when Toxward arrived in New Zealand, although he probably arrived c.1860.

In 1862 Toxward was working as a surveyor in Dunedin and as an architect with Augustus Poeppel. (Note: The pair only have 3 known tenders) Poeppel was dismissed from his position as city surveyor and architect due to malpractice. By 1864 Toxward was living in Invercargill. On 13 November 1865 Toxward was living in Wellington and by April of next year he was advertising architectural and engineering services in Wellington. That year he designed a 'Scotch Church' on Lambton Quay and would go onto design 230 buildings, mostly around Wellington but Toxward also designed buildings in the Wairarapa and New Plymouth. Toxward may have been the first to introduce rusticated boards to New Zealand in the 1860s. Toxward designed the first masonry buildings in Wellington in 1875 and this building was one of the earliest to use sprinklers.

In 1876 Toxward became the Wellington Education Board architect. (Note: The Wellington Education Board covered the area of the former Wellington Province and not the modern region or city.) In 1883 the New Zealand government had Toxward produce designs for dairy factories for a promotional booklet.

Toxward died 30 September 1891.

== Personal life ==
On 7 October 1864 Toxward married Jane Hall Hughes at St John's Church in Invercargill. In 1867 he naturalised as British citizen.

Toxward was a Grandmaster of the Wellington Freemasons, justice of the peace, and Danish consul. Toxward was a director for the Wellington Trust & Loan Company and mine manager for the Wellington Quartz Crushing Company. In his role as Danish consul Toxward assisted Danish immigrants arriving in New Zealand. Toxward arranged a display of taxidermed specimens from the Christiana Museum at the Colonial Museum and Otago Museum.

== List of works ==
Name	Date	Image	Note	Ref
St Mary's Cathedral, Wellington	1867		Destroyed by fire in 1898	
Kirkcaldie & Stains store	1868		Registered as a category 2 building with Heritage New Zealand. Only the facade remains	
Wellington Grammar School	1868		Burnt down in 1901	
Old St Paul's Cathedral, Wellington	1868–1874		Original building was designed by Frederick Thatcher but Toxward designed two extensions adding a north and south transept.	
Powles House	1872		Registered as a category 1 building with Heritage New Zealand	
6 Parliament Street	1873		Part of the Ascot Street Heritage Area	
Mount View Lunatic Asylum	1873		Partially demolished but a surviving part of the structure is registered as a category 2 building with Heritage New Zealand	
Wellington College	1874		Demolished in 1931	
Union Bank of Australia	1875		Destroyed by fire in 1906	
Wellington Hospital	1875		Demolished in 1968	
St Andrew's on the Terrace	1879		Burnt down in 1922	
Dr Buller's house	1882			
St Andrew's Church, Martinborough	1882		Registered as a category 2 building with Heritage New Zealand	
St David's Church, Petone	1889		Registered as a category 2 building with Heritage New Zealand	
First Presbyterian Church, Martinborough	1891		Scheduled with the South Wairarapa District Council	
Dr Boor's house	1866		Unknown architect, potentially Toxward. Registered as a category 1 building with Heritage New Zealand	
