= Joe Dransfield =

New Zealand mayor (1827–1906)

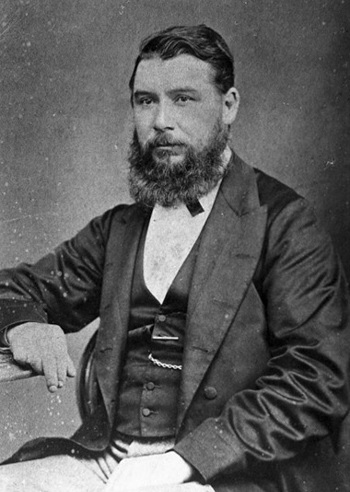

1st Mayor of Wellington
- In office 19 December 1877 – 9 May 1879
- Preceded by: William Hutchison
- Succeeded by: George Allen
- In office 28 September 1870 – 17 December 1873
- Preceded by: William Guyton
- Succeeded by: Charles Borlase

Personal details
- Born: 1827 Huddersfield, Yorkshire, England
- Died: 21 September 1906 (aged 78–79) Wellington, New Zealand

Joseph Dransfield (1827 – 21 September 1906) was a New Zealand politician who served as the Mayor of Wellington from 1870 to 1872. He was the first mayor of the reconstituted Wellington City since William Guyton was (briefly) mayor of the previous Wellington Borough in 1843.

== Background ==
Dransfield was born Huddersfield, Yorkshire, in 1827, where his father, also Joseph, was the owner of the Rookery Woollen Mills. He was educated in Huddersfield and migrated to Australia in 1852 on the Falcon when he was 25 years old before coming to Wellington in 1857. His mother and father also settled in New Zealand living for a time in Lyttelton. He was married and had several sons and daughters.

Dransfield's brother, C. E. Dransfield, was already in Wellington when he arrived and had established a general merchant business, which Dransfield eventually took over. They were major coal merchants into the 1860s, with supply contracts for the New Zealand Steam Navigation Company, and M'Meckan Blackwood's fleets. From 1878 to 1879 he was president of the chamber of commerce, having been a member for a number of years. Dransfield carried on in business until ill health forced his retirement in 1888. He sold out the goodwill and business to the United Importers Company.

== Civic roles ==
In 1842 Wellington had been declared a borough and elected its own mayor. In 1843, while William Guyton was mayor, the British Government declared the legislation that founded the borough invalid and disbanded the local government there. For the period from 1843 to 1863 Wellington had no local authority. In 1863 legislation under the provincial government allowed a town board to be set up. This was followed by legislation that allowed the establishment of the Wellington City Council in 1870.

Dransfield became mayor in 1870 after Wellington was declared a city. He was mayor again in 1878, but resigned on 9 May 1879. He had previously been chairman of the town board from 1865 to 1870, and represented Wellington City in the Wellington Provincial Council from 1863 to 1867. He was noted as securing one of Wellington's more important reclamations.

Dransfield Street in Vogeltown is named after him. Dransfield died at Wellington on 21 September 1906.

== Notes ==
Political offices
Preceded by William Guyton	Mayor of Wellington; 1870–1873 1878–1879	Succeeded by Charles Borlase
Preceded by William Hutchison	Mayor of Wellington; 1870–1873 1878–1879	Succeeded by George Allen
