= Jonas Woodward =

Businessman, educationalist, politician (1810?–1881)

Jonas Woodward (1810? – 13 June 1881) was a New Zealand businessman, educationalist, politician, congregational leader and public trustee. He was born in London, England and baptised on 29 April 1810. He represented the City of Wellington electorate on the Wellington Provincial Council from October 1855 to August 1857, and the Wellington Country electorate from August 1859 to February 1865. At various times between 1857 and 1861, he was a member of the Wellington Executive Council. He is buried at Bolton Street Memorial Park, and his grave is part of the memorial trail.

Woodward Street in central Wellington is named in his honour.
