= Fitzherbert Marriott =

The Venerable Fitzherbert Adams Marriott (27 May 1811 – 19 October 1890) was an English clergyman, the first Archdeacon of Hobart Town in Tasmania.

Marriott was born in the St Giles area of London and educated at Oriel College, Oxford. He was Rector of Cotesbach before travelling to Tasmania. He arrived there in 1843 with Francis Russell Nixon, the first Bishop of Tasmania, on board the Duke of Roxburgh. Marriott was a close friend and supporter of the Bishop in his battles for supremacy with the Governor Sir John Eardley-Wilmot. Marriott married Anne Schaw on 26 September 1848.
