= Robert Jenkins (Australian politician) =

Australian politician

Robert Pitt Jenkins (26 January 1814 – 26 October 1859) was an Australian politician.

He was born in New South Wales to merchant Robert Jenkins and Jemima Pitt. He was a pastoralist who owned land at Bombala and on the Murrumbidgee River. On 10 November 1843 he married Louisa Adelaide Plunkett. He was a member of the New South Wales Legislative Council from 1856 until 1859, when he died at sea near Wales.

For a period he lived in New Zealand. He was elected an Alderman in the first council election ever held in Wellington in 1842.
