= Public Trust =

State trustee agency of New Zealand

Public Trust logo

The Public Trust of New Zealand is a crown entity that provides trustee services to those unwilling to use private services, or required by the courts or legislation to use Public Trust. Before 2001 Public Trust was a government-appointed corporation sole and was called the Public Trustee.

The Public Trust is New Zealand's largest provider of wills and estate administration services, and provides services to individuals, charitable trusts, private training establishments, and businesses. According to its website it manages the financial affairs of over 800 people, administers over 4,000 trusts, oversees enactment of over 8,000 wills, manages over 400 charitable trusts, and has supervision of over NZ$90billion through their Customer Trustee Services division.

The Public Trust has 24 customer care centres across New Zealand, along with a workforce of approximately 400 staff. The Public Trust is governed by a Board, and its management is undertaken by a hired executive team.

== History ==
=== Origins 1870–1873 ===
In early New Zealand, where mortality was high, literacy low, and the population mobile, but travel and communications difficult, there were problems getting reliable volunteers to be trustees, that is to look after assets, (usually an estate where the beneficiaries are minors).

Similar problems occurred in Australia, where in 1860 George Webster, now a New Zealand member of parliament had attempted to found a state trustee in Victoria.

In 1870 when the country was less than 30 years old, a member of parliament, Edward Cephas John Stevens, suggested a state-backed trust to colonial treasurer Julius Vogel, during a casual conversation about a case where a private trustee had embezzled money. The pair were apparently unaware of Webster's earlier proposal.

Vogel was a keen promoter of state involvement in business, having founded State Insurance in 1869. He introduced the Public Trustee Bill to Parliament on 28 July 1870. The bill was passed by the house of representatives, but defeated in the legislative council, (New Zealand's then upper house), by three votes.

In 1871 Vogel drafted an amended bill, removing two criticised aspects; the ability of the Public trustee to act under a power of attorney and the government guarantee, (both of which were soon reintroduced), and provision for closer supervision of the Public Trustee was included. The bill was presented to the house on 23 July 1872. Again it was heavily criticised in the upper house, where opposition was organised by Henry Sewell, who by the time of its final reading was Colonial Secretary.

Sewell described the idea as "one of the most extraordinary that ever entered in to the imagination of any persons out of the limit of those buildings which were appointed for the custody of persons not able to take care of their own property". Ironically, the bill was then amended to place mental patient's estates in the hands of the public trustee.

The electorate was mobilised in support of the bill, notably by Anglican and Presbyterian churches, and Sewell himself lost his position nine days after the final debate, when the Stafford government was ousted by Waterhouse. The Public Trust Act passed into law on 25 October 1872.

=== The first Public Trustee 1873–1880 ===
Jonas Woodward, a 62-year-old former banker, auditor and high ranking civil servant, was appointed the first Public Trustee gazetting the functions of the office on 30 December 1872 and starting on the job on 1 January 1873. It was initially considered a part-time job, and made up only a quarter of his salary.

During the first year the main business of the Public trustee was with intestate estates – that is, people who had died without leaving a will (234 of the 314 estates administered in 1873). This was not a matter considered by the Public Trust Act, and an amendment was introduced in September. A further amendment on 1 November required life insurance companies to deposit security with the Public Trustee. On the same day, Woodward also acquired his first employee, having previously done all tasks in the office himself. By 1876 the office was self funding, in 1877 the second employee (an untrained cadet) joined the office. By 1878 the Public Trustee was administering 1432 estates. In that year Jonas Woodward handed over his responsibilities as Commissioner of the Government Life Insurance office and Major Charles Heaphy V.C. Woodward retired on reaching 70 on 1 May, (although as his successor Robert Hammerton was unable to start until 8 July, he continued to work on without salary until 8 July).

=== A royal commission 1880–1891 ===
Robert Hamerton, a former court registrar, expanded the office to a 12 staff by 1890, when 5,674 estates were administered.
