= William Guyton =

New Zealand politician (1816–1884)

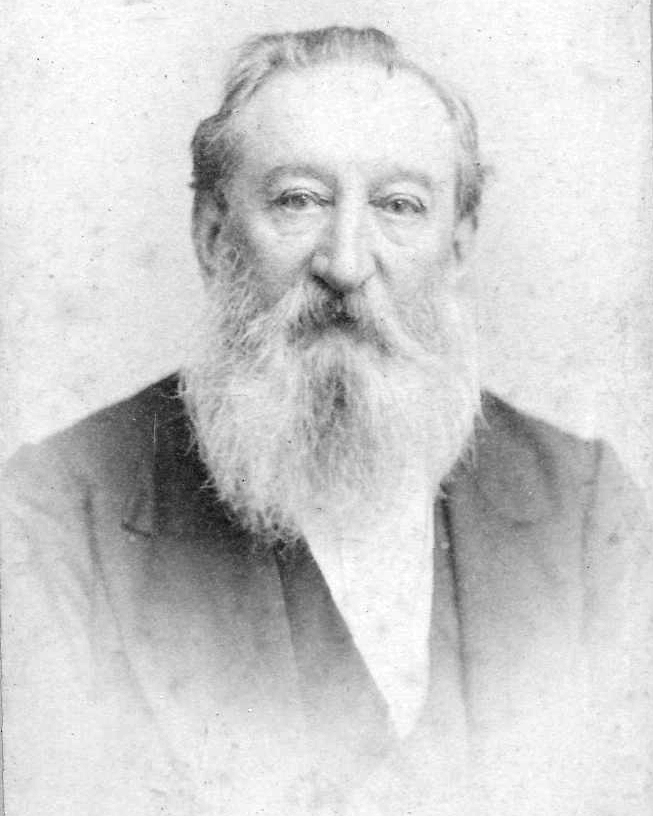

2nd Mayor of Wellington
- In office 26 July 1843 – 9 December 1843
- Preceded by: George Hunter
- Succeeded by: Joe Dransfield

Personal details
- Born: 1816 Liverpool, England
- Died: 30 June 1884 (aged 67–68) Norwich, England
- Spouse: Sophia Guyton (m. 1847)
- Children: 5
- Occupation: Shipping agent

William Guyton JP (1816 – 30 June 1884) was a New Zealand politician who served as the Mayor of Wellington from July to December 1843. He obtained this position upon the death of George Hunter and held until the borough was abolished by the British Government.

== Family life ==
Guyton was born in Liverpool in 1816. He sailed to New Zealand on the Ridgway owned vessel the Coromandel which left from London on 10 December 1839 and arrived in Port Nicholson on 29 August 1840. Although not confirmed, Guyton appears to have returned to Middlesex and Lancashire, England around or after 1844, and either returned via New Zealand or went directly to Australia in 1854.

He married Sophia (born 5 October 1816) on 26 July 1847 in Cheshire, England. They had five children, two of whom; Joseph Hope (1850 - Middlesex), and Rebecca Crane (1853 - Lancashire) were born in England and the remaining three; Florence Monmouth (born at sea in 1854), Marion Constance (1855), and Jessie Crane (1857) were born in Sydney, Australia where they had moved in 1854. On 17 December 1857 Guyton and his family left Sydney on the Viemera for London. They had returned to England and lived in 9 Alexandra Road, Heigham, Norwich, Norfolk. Guyton died in 1884.

== Business activities ==
Guyton was in partnership with John, Joseph, and Thomas Ridgway; and George Butler Earp in Wellington. The partnership was called Ridgways, Guyton, and Earp and was formed in Liverpool in 1839. They were shipping owners and agents, land agents, and merchants. Guyton had arrived in Wellington on 29 August 1840 with Isaac Ridgway and Earp. After setting up business, Guyton sailed from Wellington to Wanganui on the Jewess on 9 December 1840 and returned to Wellington on the Jane on 30 January 1841. The purpose of his journey appears to have been selecting sections for sale. A number of these sections, owned by the partnership, were sold in 1859 well after the partnership had ended. The partnership was dissolved on 27 July 1844. A new partnership was formed called Ridgeways, Hickson, and Co. Guyton was not a member.

While the original partnership was extant, Guyton, in conjunction with his other business partners, constructed one of Wellington's earliest wharves on Lambton Quay.

Guyton's next business venture in the 1850s at North Shore, Sydney was unsuccessful, with him being declared insolvent in November 1856.

== Civil service ==
Guyton was one of the founding members of the Commercial and Agricultural Club in Wellington. He was on the Management Committee of Wellington's first library. He was appointed as a Justice of the Peace on 19 April 1842 and sat on Governor Hobson's Legislative Council.

In October 1842 he was elected an alderman in Wellington's first municipal election and appointed Mayor on 26 July 1843 after the first Mayor, George Hunter, died. With the abolition of the municipality in 1843, Guyton wound up its affairs. The council's final meeting was held in early December 1843. All the Corporation's papers were deposited in the bank (probably the Union Bank of Australia's Wellington branch). The British Government in 1843 had declared Governor Hobson's 1842 proclamation invalid, which was the cause of the dissolution of the council. There was no local government in Wellington until 1864 with the establishment of the Wellington Town Board and no mayor until Joseph Dransfield in 1870, with the formation of the Wellington City Council.

Political offices
Preceded by George Hunter	Mayor of Wellington; 1843	Succeeded by Joseph Dransfield
