= Bolton Street Cemetery =

Cemetery in Wellington, New Zealand

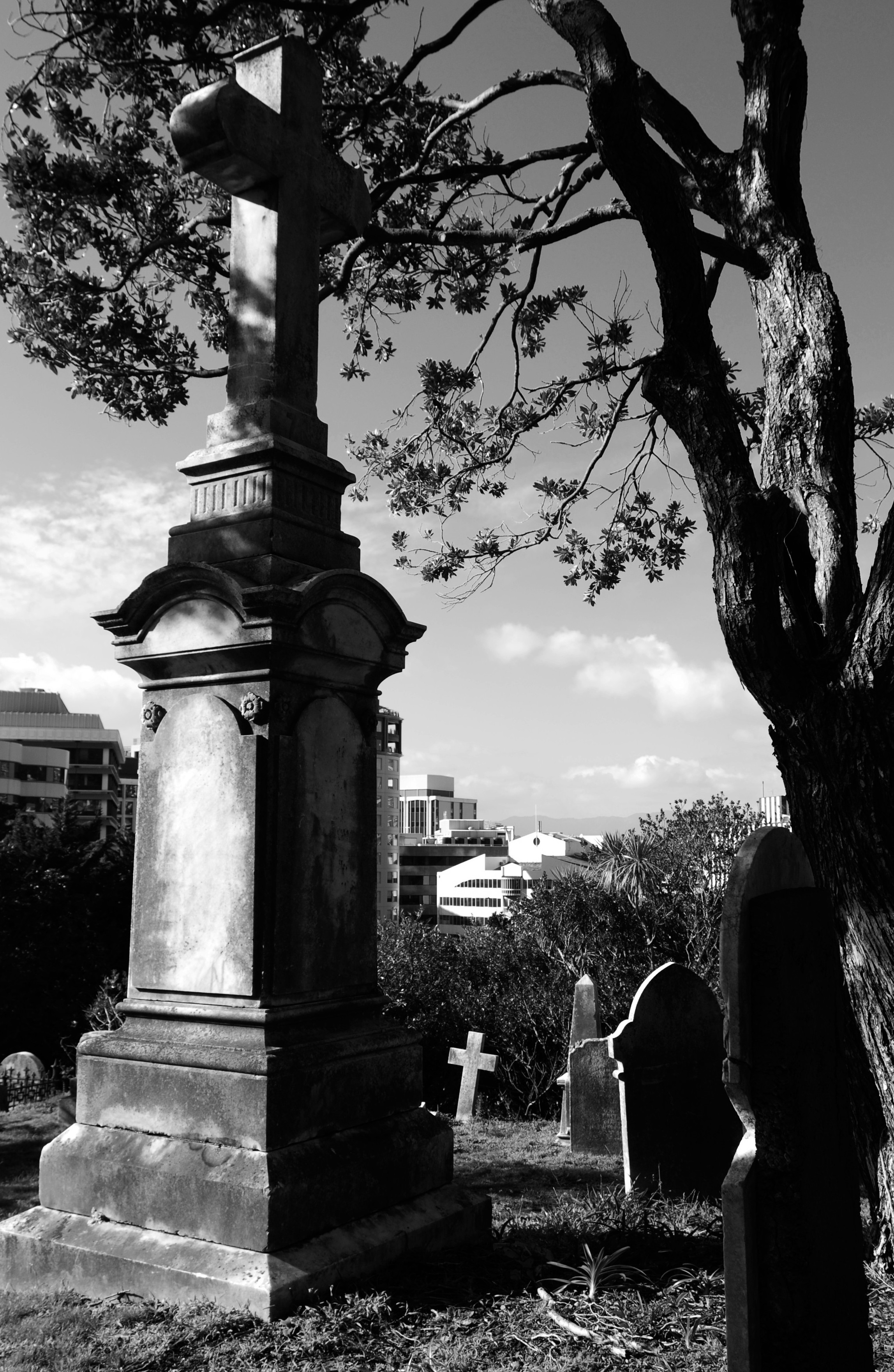
- View of Bolton Street Cemetery, with central city high-rises in the background

- Location within New Zealand Wellington
- Location: Wellington
- Nearest city: Wellington, New Zealand
- Coordinates: 41°16′44″S 174°46′23″E
- Area: 18 acres (7.3 ha) including area acquired for motorway through the park
- Established: 1840 as a cemetery and later converted to park
- Governing body: New Parks and Recreation Department of the Wellington City Council

Bolton Street Cemetery, formerly known as Bolton Street Memorial Park, is the oldest cemetery in Wellington, New Zealand. It was Wellington's main cemetery from 1840 until 1892. About 8000 people were buried there, including politicians and notable Wellingtonians including William Wakefield, Wellington's founder. The cemetery was split in half by a controversial motorway construction in the late 1960s. The cemetery is situated in two parts on the hillside between the Botanic Garden and the central business district and is notable for its variety of historic Victorian-era graves, many surrounded by rare heritage roses, and its picturesque setting and views over the city. It forms a popular walking route from the Botanic Garden to the central business district.

== Cemetery 1840–1892 ==
Bolton Street Cemetery was established in 1840 on the outskirts of the new town of Wellington, when Captain Mein Smith of the New Zealand Company set aside 18 acres (7.3 hectares) of land at Bolton Street as a public cemetery for all denominations. This was a new and liberal concept at the time. Catholics requested and were granted a separate area about one kilometre to the south of Bolton Street, which became Mount Street Cemetery.

In 1851, Bolton Street Cemetery was split into three parts: Bolton Street Cemetery (for Church of England burials), Sydney Street Cemetery (the public one for other denominations) and the Jewish Cemetery. Approximately 7 acres (2.8 ha) were used by the Church of England, two roods and 37 perches were for Jews, and 8 acres (3.2 ha) were set aside for the public cemetery.

The Colonial Observatory (also known as the Wellington Observatory) was New Zealand's first astronomical observatory. It was built at the top of Bolton Street Cemetery in 1868 for the Government Time Service. The observatory was demolished in 1906 to make way for construction of the Seddon memorial, and was replaced by the Dominion Observatory in the Botanic Garden. One of the paths in the cemetery is named Observatory Path.

Some of the original site was surrendered for the extension and reforming of Bowen Street and formation of Anderson Park in the 1930s.

By the 1880s Bolton Street Cemetery was almost at capacity, and as the city grew around it there were health concerns and complaints about activities in the cemetery from residents living in sight of it. In June 1890, the Evening Post reported that at the rate of 25 burials per month, Bolton Street would run out of space in the next two months. Wellington City Council began searching for a site for a new cemetery. The Council considered various sites before buying 95 acres of land at Karori in 1890. Karori Cemetery's first burial took place on 3 August 1891, and in 1892 Bolton Street Cemetery was closed to burials except for relatives of those already interred there.

By the late 1920s, the cemetery was described as "neglected".

== 1960s: Wellington Urban Motorway ==
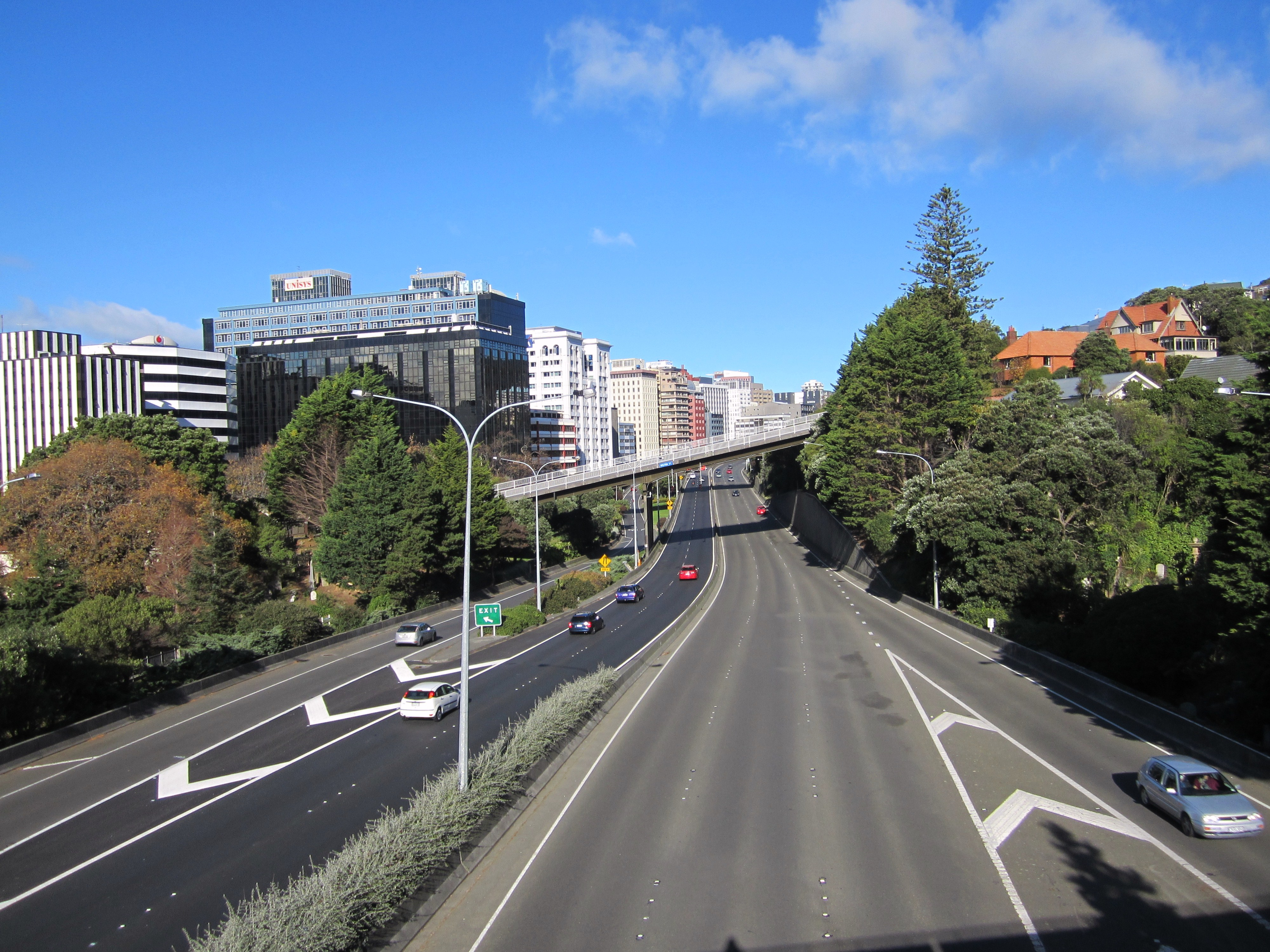
The cemetery is bisected by the Wellington Urban Motorway.

Following the Second World War the population of the Hutt Valley and Porirua basin increased, leading to growing congestion on the Hutt Road into Wellington and in the city itself. Plans for a motorway through the city along the western foothills were submitted to the National Roads Board in June 1960. U.S. consultants De Leuw Cather released their report in August 1963, recommending a motorway across Thorndon and the city to the Basin Reserve and Mt Victoria Tunnel. The plan for the motorway took it through the middle of Bolton Street Cemetery.

The cemetery had long been closed to new interments, but had huge historical significance as the burial place of many early Wellington settlers, and there was controversy about disturbing the graves. A lobby group, 'Bolton Street Cemetery Preservation Society', formed in 1964 to protest the possible destruction of or damage to the cemetery. Protestors were unable to stop the motorway from being built through the cemetery, but their efforts ensured that the cemetery got heritage status and became a city reserve.

Between 1968 and 1971 the cemetery was closed to all burials and public access while about 3700 burials in the way of the motorway were exhumed. Most of the remains were reinterred in a large vault underneath a memorial lawn in the lower part of the cemetery, while others were reinterred at other cemeteries. Salvaged gravestones were shifted to other parts of the cemetery. The relocation of tombstones during the motorway project fascinated local artist Rita Angus, and became the subject of several of her best-known later paintings.

A planned "garden piazza" over the motorway was never built; instead, a footbridge (the Denis McGrath Bridge, named for the deputy mayor) was built over the motorway to link the two now-separate halves of the cemetery.

Historian Margaret Alington was commissioned to write a history of the cemetery. Her book, Unquiet Earth: a History of the Bolton Street Cemetery, was published in 1978.

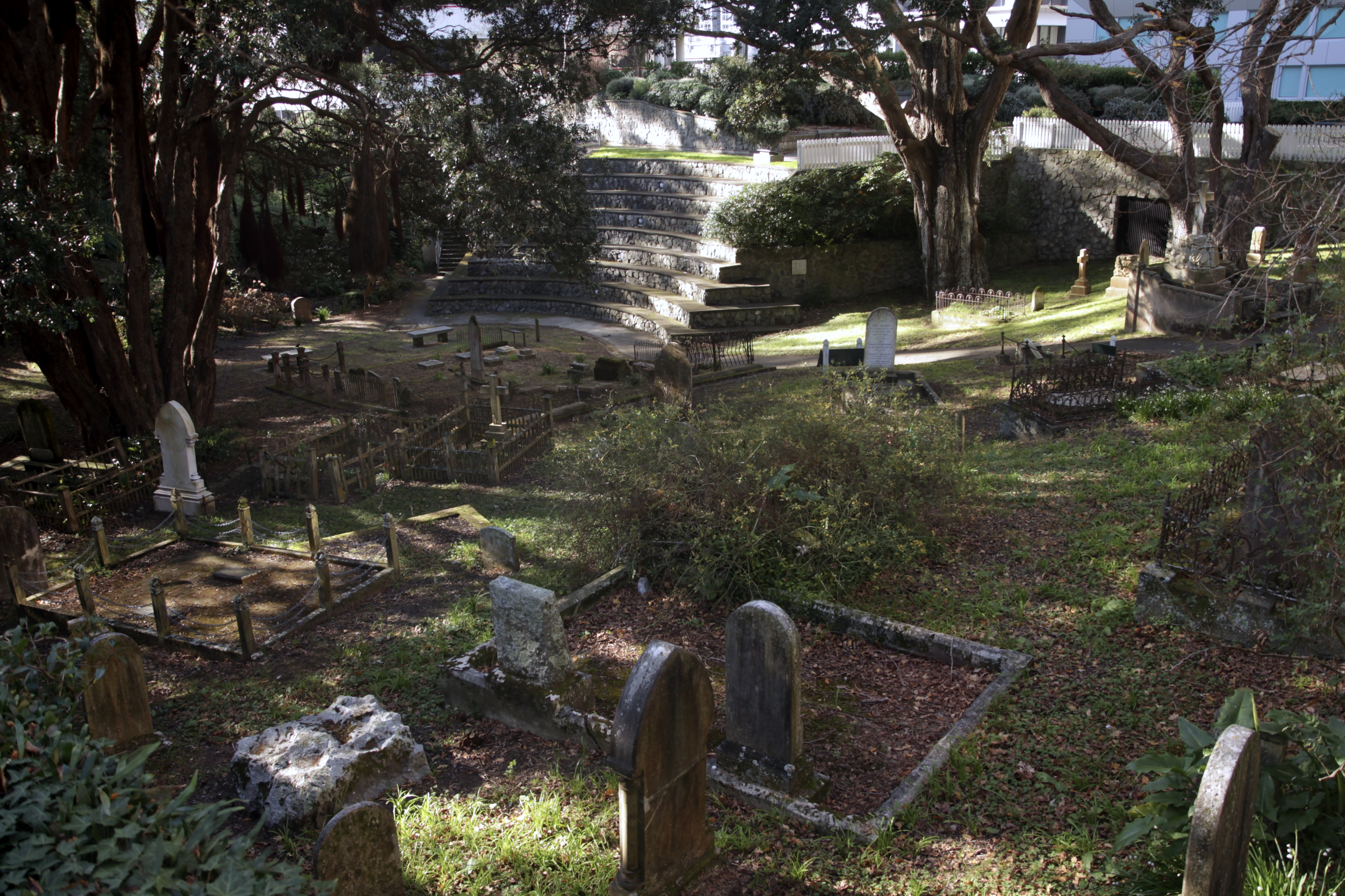
The lower part of the cemetery, showing the amphitheatre

== 1980–2014: memorial park ==
In 1980 the cemetery was renamed the 'Bolton Street Memorial Park' and gazetted as a Historic Reserve under the Reserves Act 1977. The Church of England's sexton's cottage and land were incorporated into the reserve in 1989. In 2014, Wellington City Council changed the name of the reserve back to 'Bolton Street Cemetery' in recognition of customary usage and the fact that it was still a cemetery containing human remains.

== Description ==
The original cemetery site was 18 acres (7.3 ha) in size. The motorway took up 3.7 acres (1.5 ha), encroaching on to about 4.5 acres (1.8 ha) of wooded burial ground. The current cemetery site, about 1.85 hectares (4.6 acres) in size, includes a land gift from Morva Williams, who lived next door to the cemetery. Williams died in 2002 and gifted almost half of her property to Wellington City Council so that her trees and garden could be looked after as part of the cemetery.

The cemetery stretches uphill between the Terrace and the Botanic Garden. There are areas of open lawn but most of the undulating topography is covered with a mix of regenerating native scrub and plantings of exotic trees, shrubs, perennials and bulbs. Tutaenui Creek is located in a gully within the cemetery.

The main entrance is via a brick and wrought iron gate at the top of the cemetery at Kinross Street near the Botanic Garden and Anderson Park. Access to the lower section of the cemetery is from Bolton Street or a pathway from Bowen Street near Education House. A footbridge over the motorway connects the upper and lower parts of the cemetery. There are named paths in both parts of the cemetery, with signs detailing Wellington's colonial history. Paths and trails through the cemetery are popular with walkers and joggers. Some trails are steep and unsealed and have steps. The amphitheatre in the lower part of the cemetery forms a quiet shady spot for reflection or eating lunch.

=== Roses ===
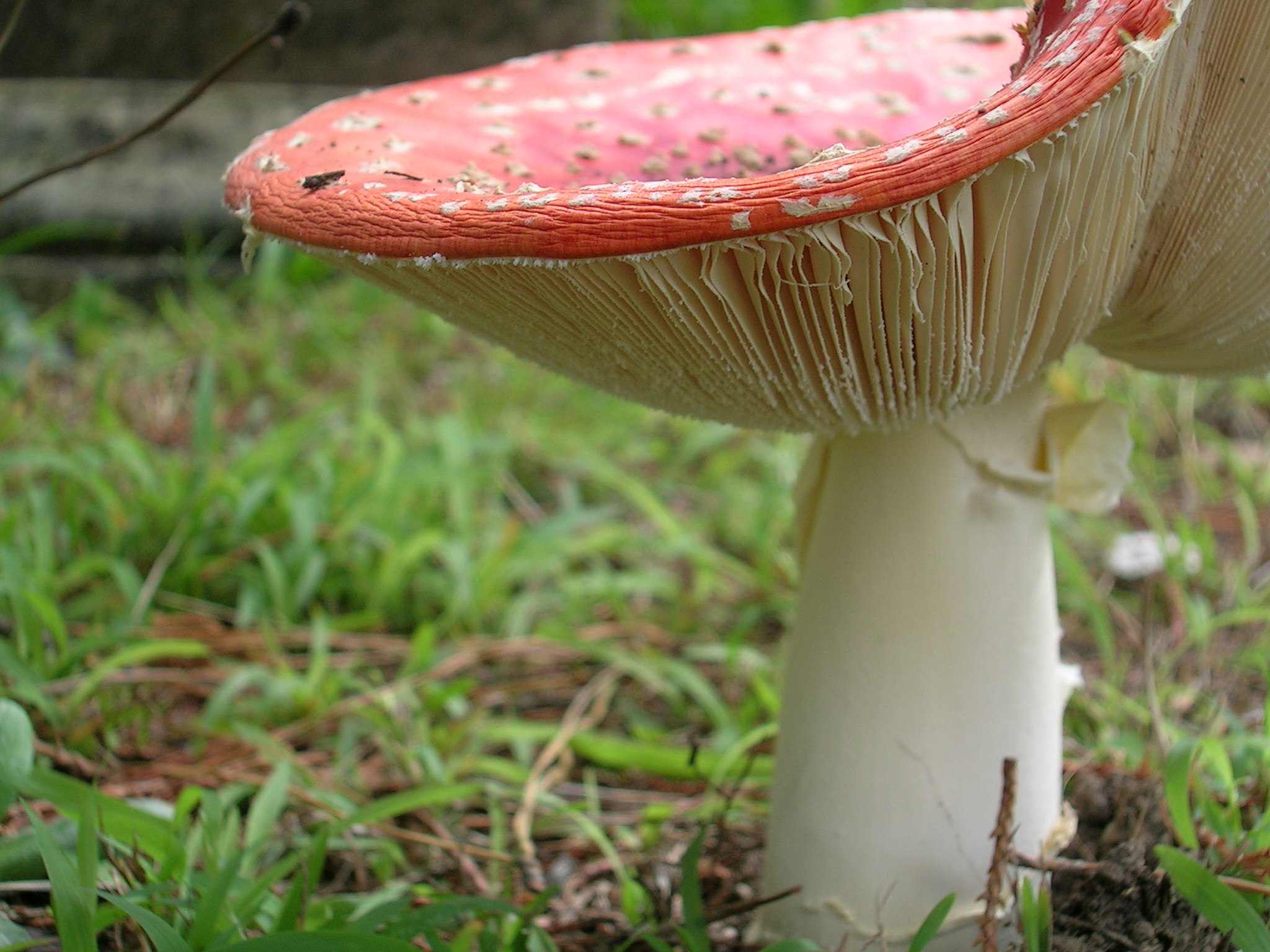
Flora in the park include Rosa banksiae (left) and mushrooms like this Amanita muscaria (right).

The park's heritage rose collection is of national significance. When land was allotted on the hillside in 1840 for the cemetery, the original settlers planted roses. These were later supplemented by the Wellington Botanic Garden in association with Heritage Roses New Zealand Inc. Under the Wellington City Council Management Plan, the roses are maintained by Wellington Botanic Garden.

The "memorial roses" reported from the park are: Rosa banksiae 'Lutea', Rosa banksiae alba plena, Rosa indica major, 'Félicité et Perpétue, 'Climbing Cécile Brünner', and 'Souvenir de la Malmaison', which were planted by people visiting the graves, gifts of plants by the public, members of the Wellington Heritage Rose Society, and also from Europe under a seed exchange programme. According to the recorded list, the cemetery now has 210 heritage roses.

== Points of interest ==
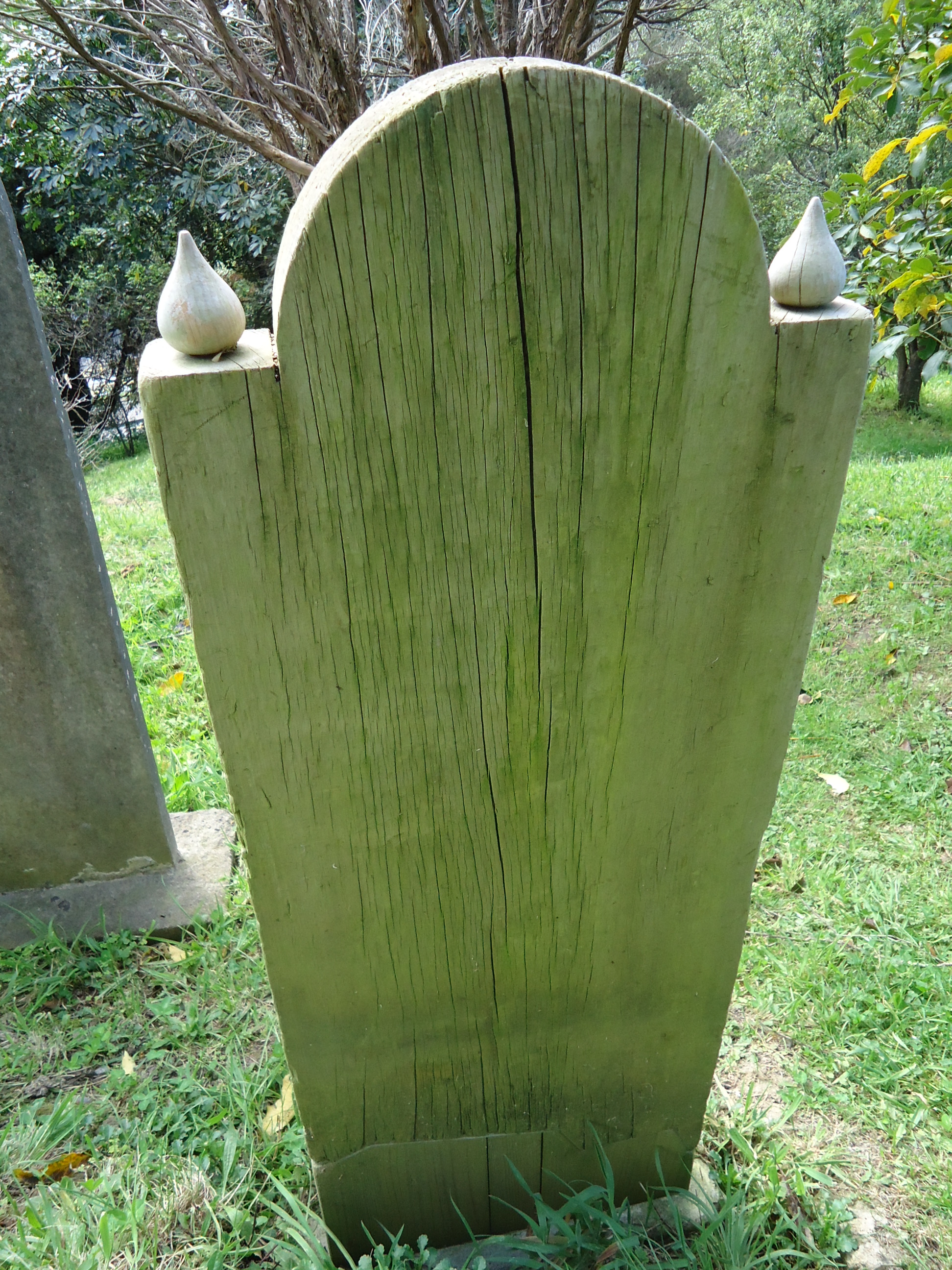
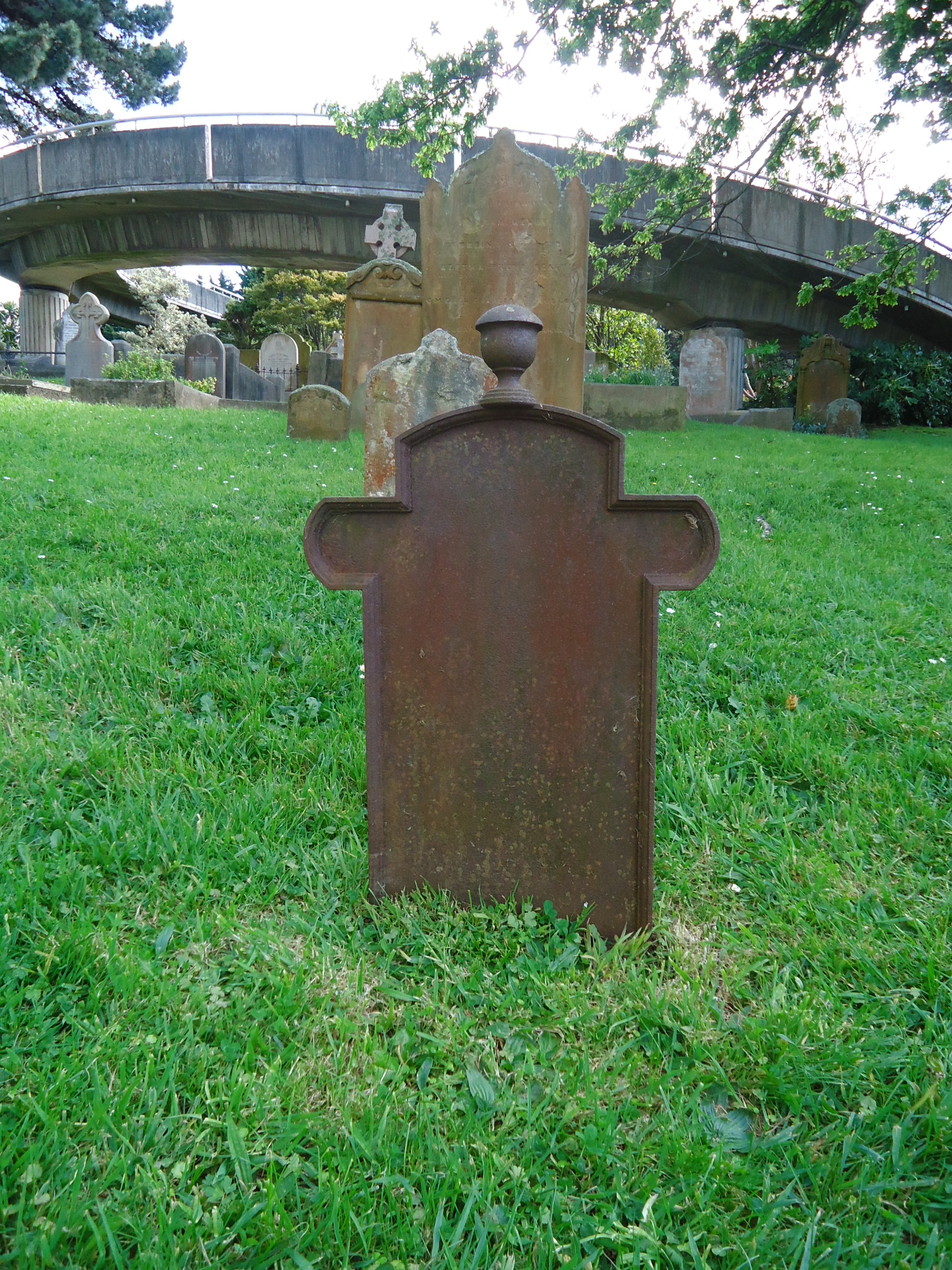
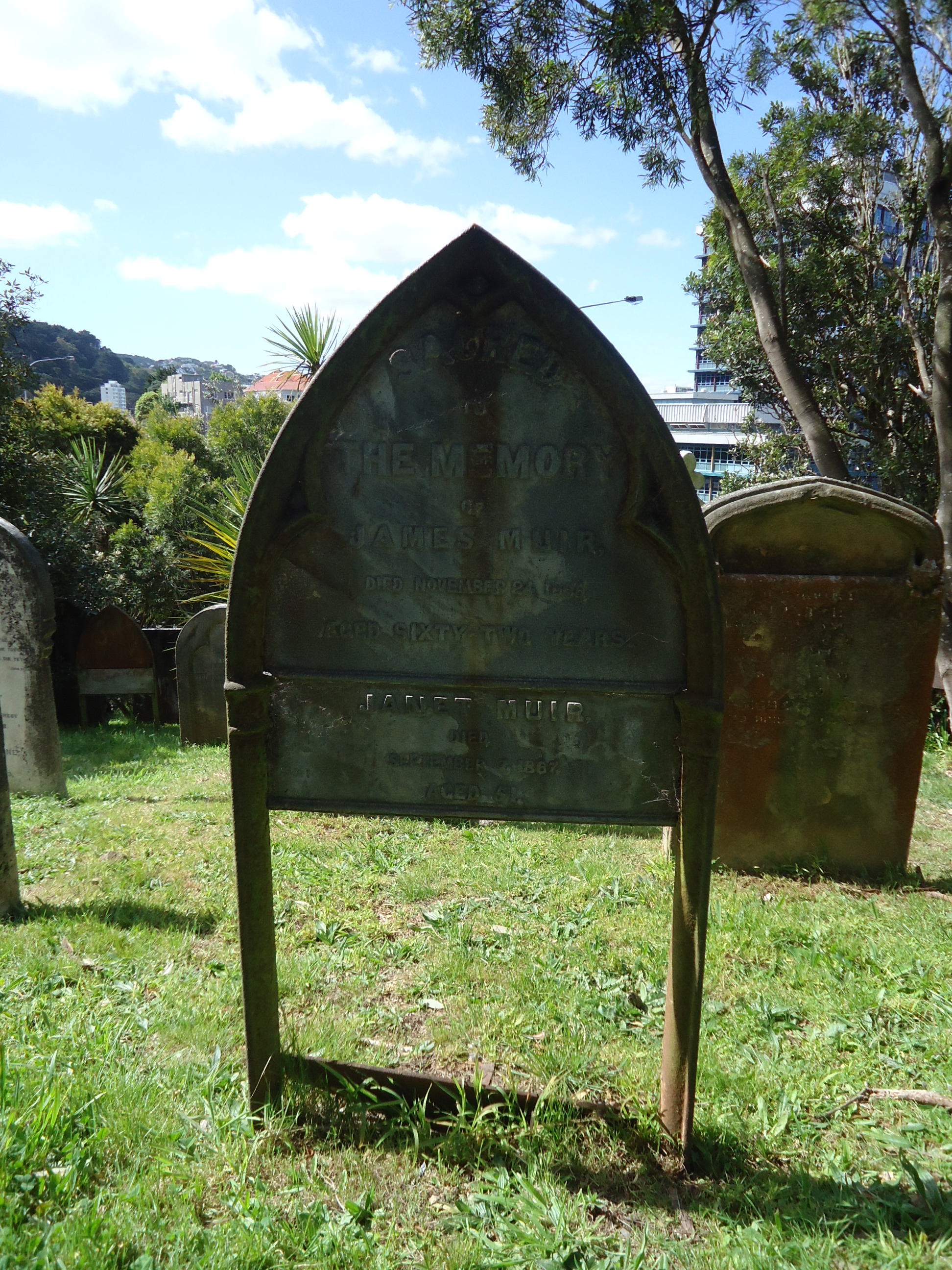
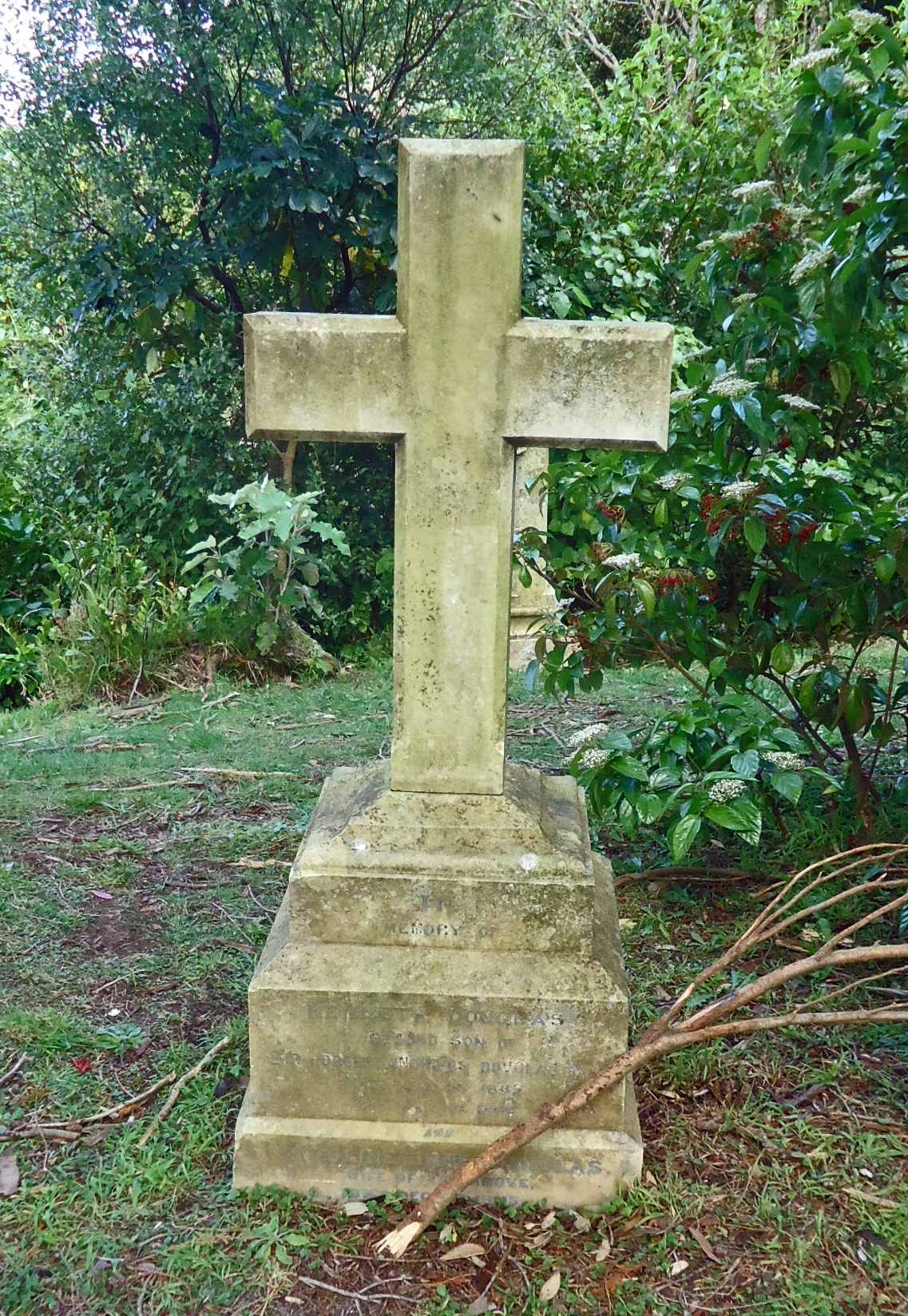
Wooden, iron and stone grave markers at the cemetery

=== Graves ===
About 1300 gravestones remain in the cemetery, though only 600 are in their original position. The gravestones span the fashions of the Victorian period. Some wooden tablets, the earliest grave markers, still remain, and there are also grave markers made of iron. Many graves are surrounded by wooden or iron fences. A memorial trail map guides visitors to interesting graves in the cemetery.

About 3,700 burials were exhumed during the motorway construction. Most of these remains were reburied in a vault underneath a memorial lawn in the lower part of the cemetery. The vault is outlined in bricks on the lawn, and an amphitheatre was built around the lawn to form a quiet area to sit and rest.

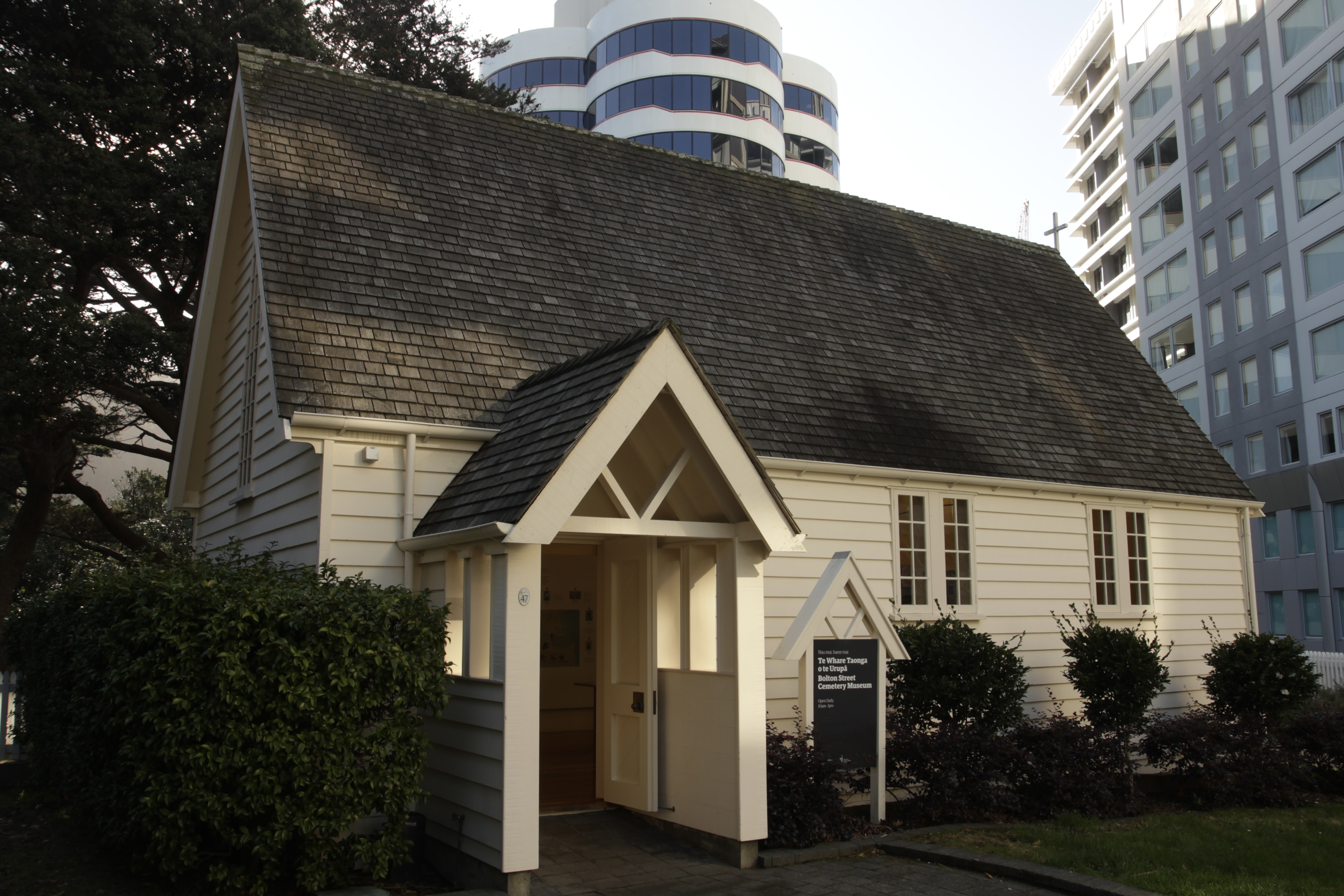
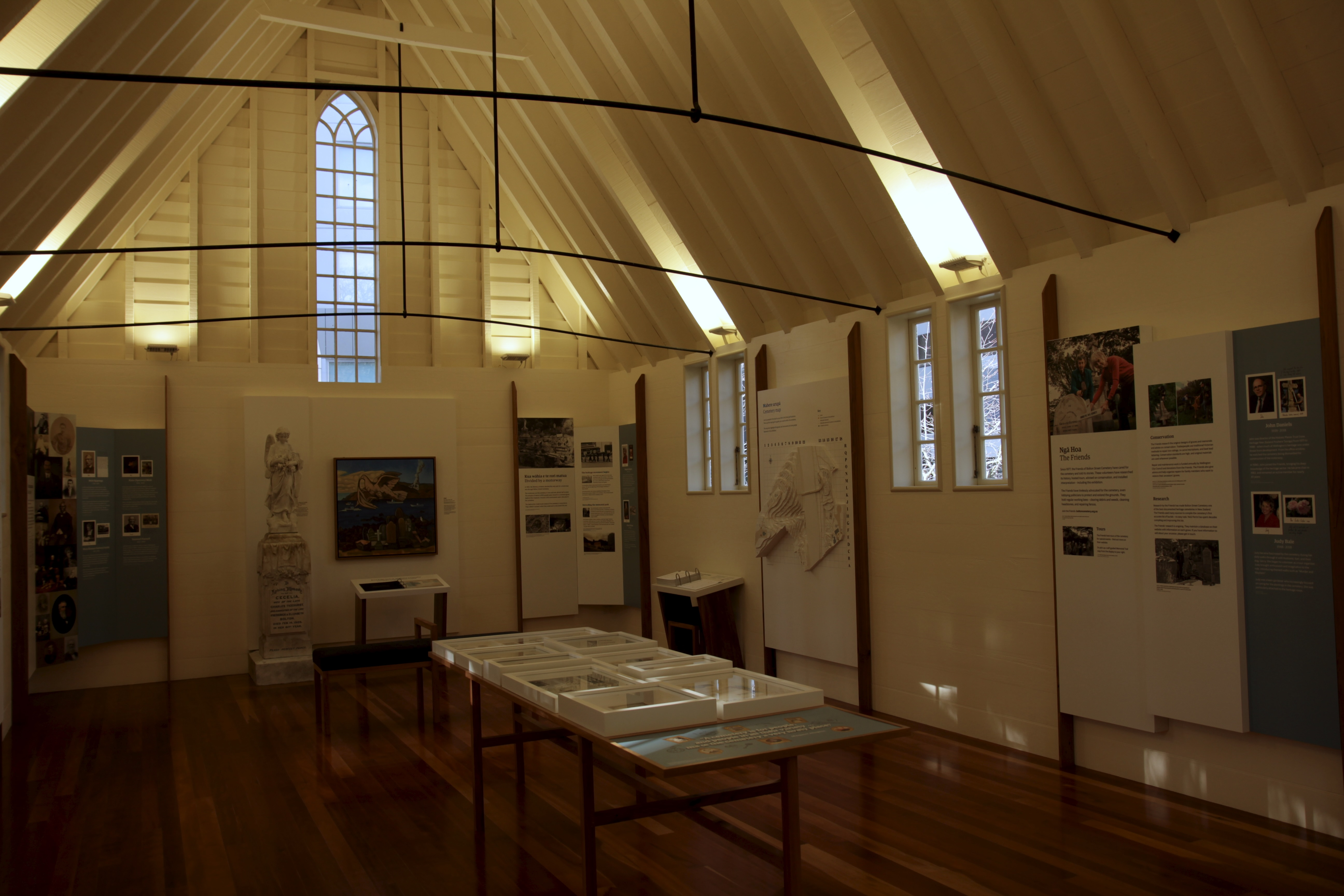
The replica chapel used as a museum

=== Buildings ===
Of the initial three buildings constructed in the cemetery area, only one remains. The public cemetery's wooden Sexton's Cottage, built in 1857, was demolished in 1908; a brick outline in the upper lawn shows where it was located.

The Church of England's Sexton's Cottage is located at 26 Bolton Street adjacent to the lower part of the cemetery, and is one of Wellington's earliest surviving homes. It was built of timber in 1857 and enlarged in 1885, and retains much of its original layout. The cottage was owned by the Church of England until 1920, then privately owned until the land was bought for the motorway construction. Spared demolition, the cottage was restored by the Ministry of Works and Development as part of the motorway works and given to Wellington City Council in 1978. It was later included in the Bolton St Memorial Park reserve. The cottage is sometimes used as a residence for international artists, and at other times is tenanted. It is not open to the public. The cottage has a Historic Place Category 1 classification from Heritage New Zealand.

The Mortuary Chapel, built of timber in 1866, was left to deteriorate and was finally demolished in 1969 to make way for the motorway. A replica chapel based on original drawings was built and serves as the cemetery's visitor centre. Situated in the lower part of the cemetery, it contains exhibits on the cemetery's history and stories and lists of names of those buried there.

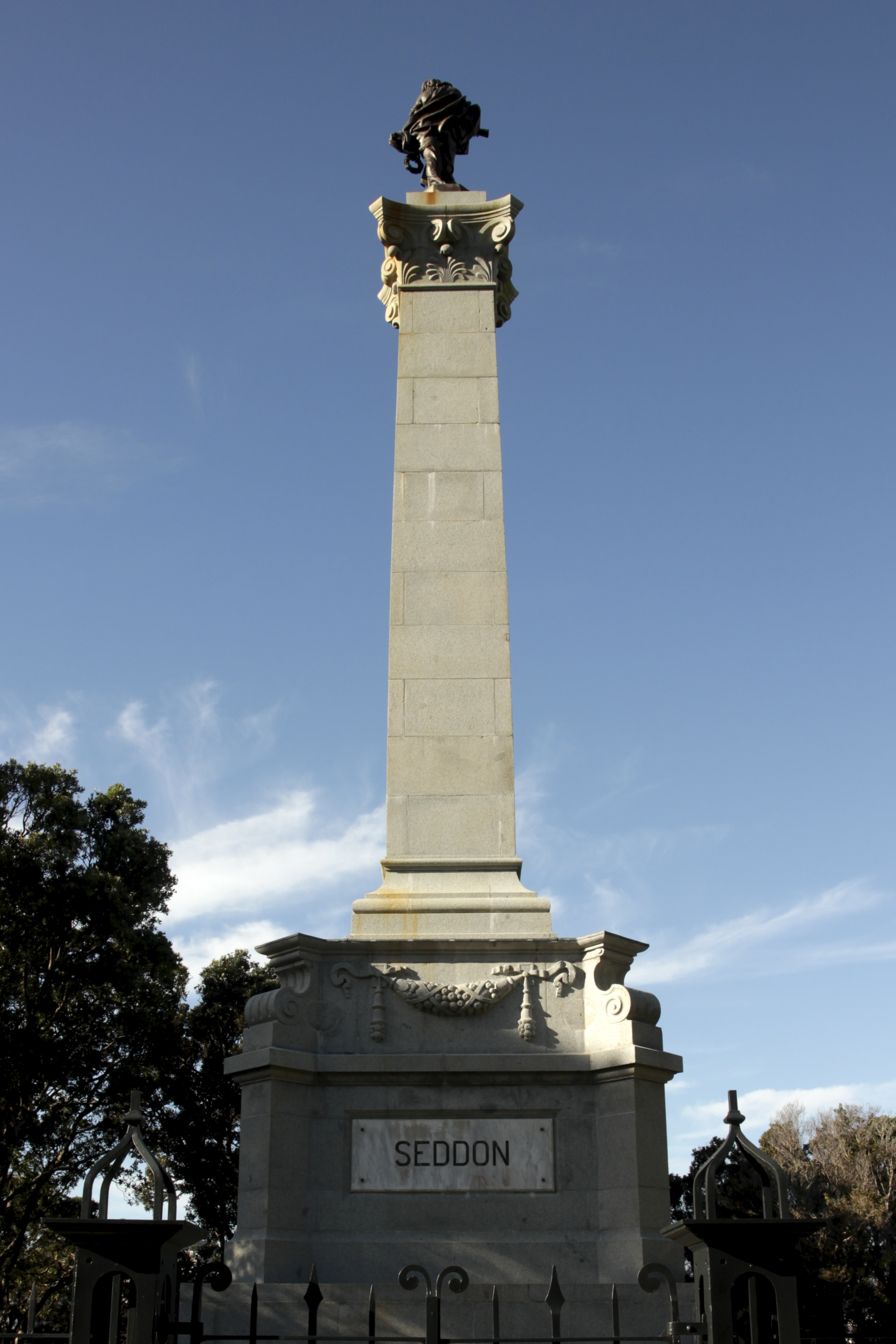
Seddon memorial

=== Seddon memorial ===
The Seddon memorial located just outside the main cemetery gates in Kinross Street commemorates former prime minister Richard Seddon. Following Seddon's death in 1906, plans were put in place to erect a suitable memorial which would also incorporate a Seddon family mausoleum. The existing Colonial Time Service Observatory on top of Observatory Hill (today part of the cemetery) was torn down to make way for the memorial. A new observatory was later constructed at the top of the Botanic Garden.

The memorial was designed by government architect John Campbell and constructed by Edwards and Son of Wellington between 1908 and 1910 at a cost £2,746. The above-ground portion is made of reinforced concrete faced with Coromandel granite. The memorial is topped by a bronze female figure approximately 8 feet (2.4 m) in height and weighing 2 long tons (2,000 kg) symbolising 'Zealandia', the country mourning its dead. Costing approximately £500, the figure was designed at the London studio of sculptor Henry Poole and cast by Alexander Parlanti. The concrete crypt underneath contains the body of Seddon, his wife Louisa, their daughter Mary Stuart Hay and a memorial to their son Captain Richard Spotswood Seddon who was killed in 1918 while serving in France.

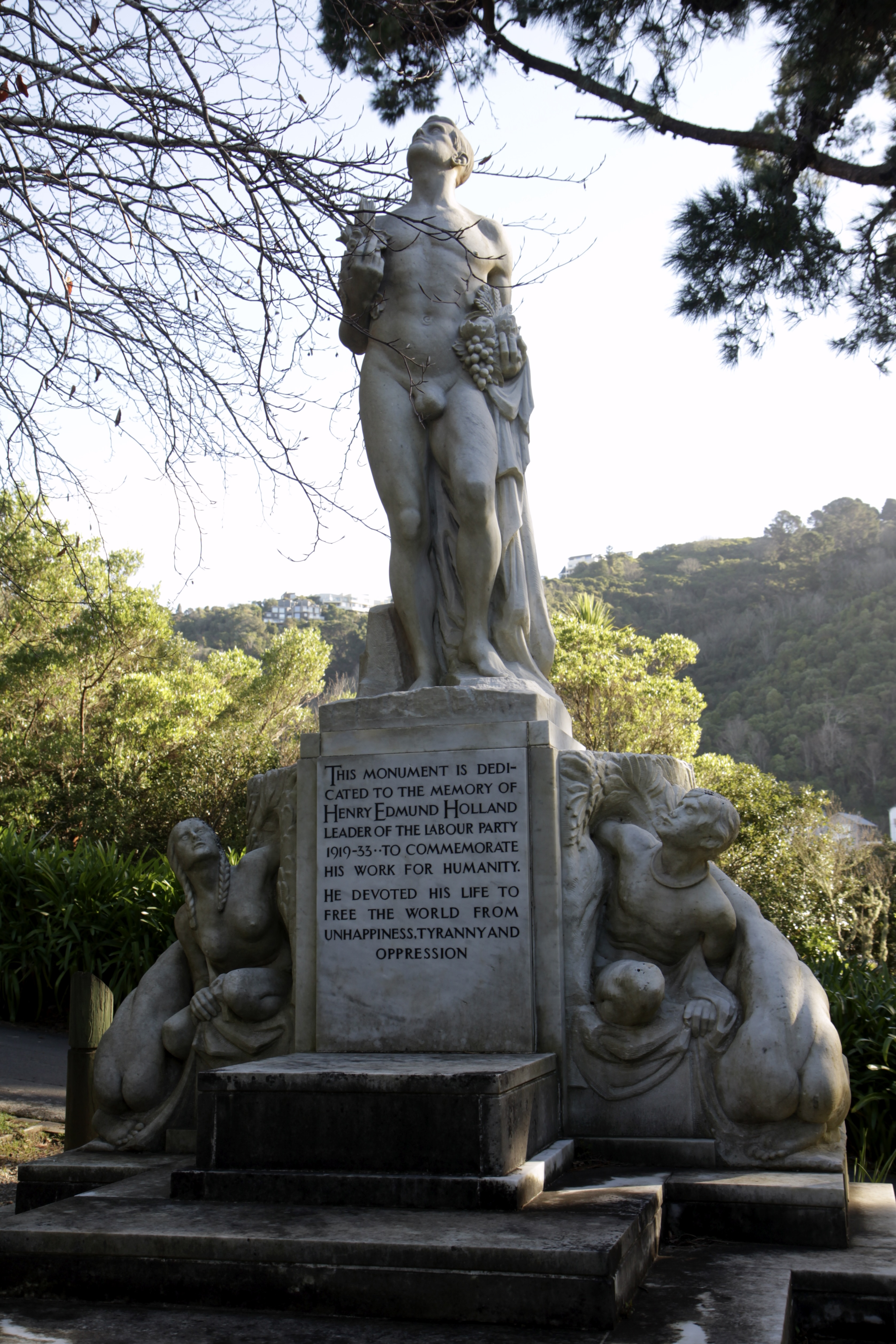
Harry Holland memorial

The family remains were temporally removed between 2021 and December 2022 when the memorial was restored and seismically strengthened by the installation of a structural steel frame in the crypt and central void, combined with the installation of 17 post-tension tie rods.

=== Holland memorial ===
Harry Holland was the second leader of the Labour Party. He died on 8 October 1933, and on 9 October 1937 a memorial to him was unveiled by his successor as leader of the Labour Party, Michael Joseph Savage. The inscription on the memorial reads "This monument is dedicated to Henry Edmund Holland Leader of the Labour Party 1919-33 to commemorate his work for humanity. He devoted his life to free the world from unhappiness, tyranny and oppression." The memorial was sculpted from Carrara marble by Richard Gross and symbolises the struggle by primitive man to be free and emerge from chaos. At the base of a pedestal four figures are freeing themselves from the rough block of marble, looking upwards and forward. On top of the base is a figure of a young man holding wheat, grapes, and olives in one hand, symbolising the material things of life, and in the other hand holding flowers, symbolising life's spiritual things. The sculpture shows that "mankind, emancipated and untrammelled, stands forth at last to inherit the fruits of the earth and the flowers of the field, and to achieve material and spiritual well-being".

== Burials ==
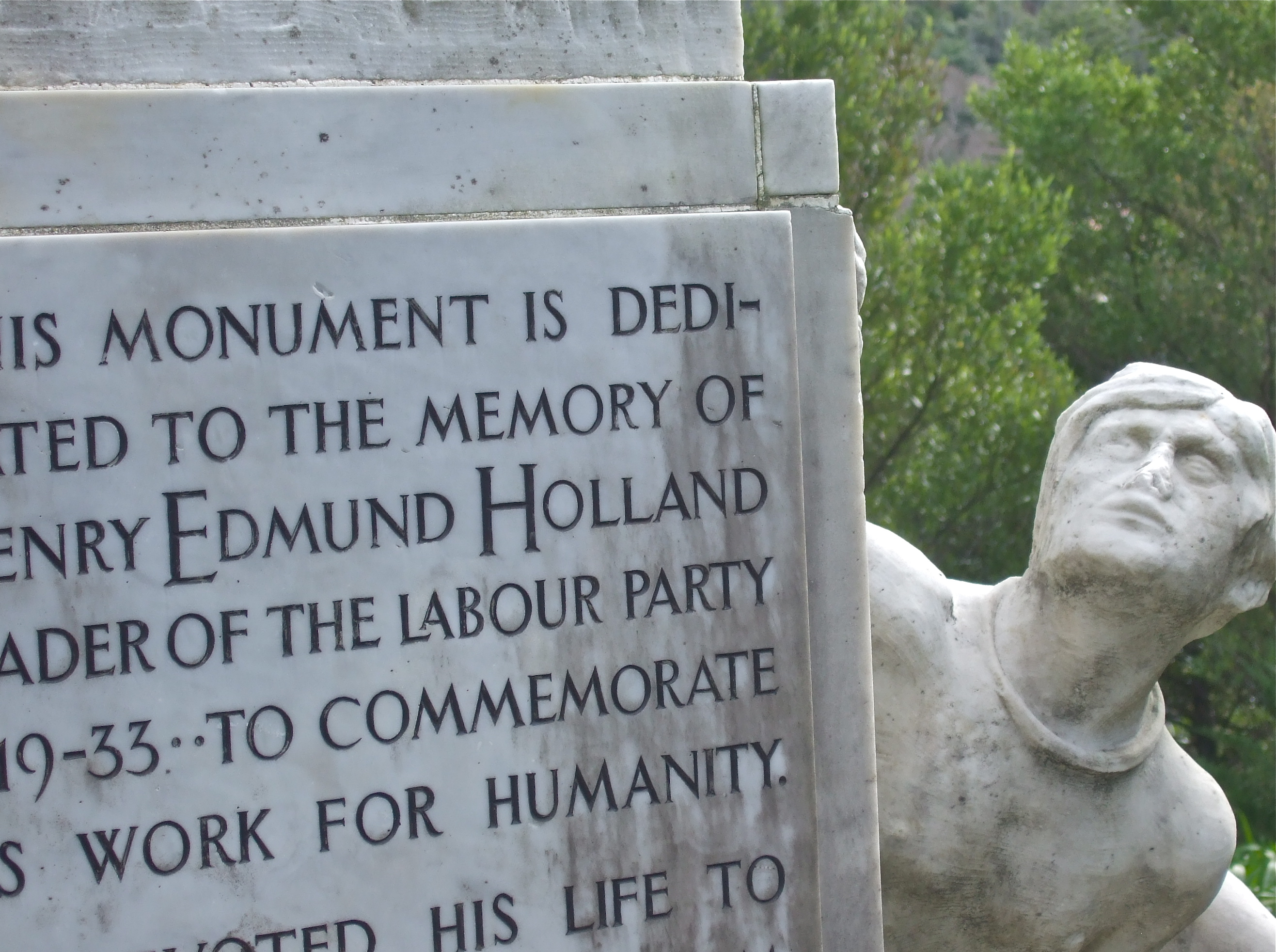
Detail of the Harry Holland monument showing a struggling worker

=== Graves still existing ===
- William Beetham (1809–1888), esteemed portrait painter and founder of New Zealand Academy of Fine Arts in 1882.
- Henry Blundell (1813–1878), newspaper proprietor and founder of The Evening Post
- James FitzGerald (circa 1818 – 1896), prominent 19th century politician
- Harry Holland (1868–1933), leader of the New Zealand Labour Party
- Kennedy Macdonald (1847–1914), 19th century Liberal Party Member of Parliament; the Macdonald grave is also notable for its angel statue in commemoration of their three sons lost within one month in 1876 to scarlet fever
- Samuel Duncan Parnell (1810–1890), credited with the establishment of the Eight-hour day in New Zealand
- John Plimmer (1812–1905), entrepreneur who is sometimes called "the Father of Wellington"
- William Barnard Rhodes (1807?–1878), businessman, pastoralist and politician; at his death, one of the richest people in New Zealand
- Richard Seddon (1845–1906), longest-serving Prime Minister of New Zealand (from 1893 to 1906) was the first to grant voting rights to women and institute old pension to citizens
- Christian Toxward (1831–1891), Wellington architect
- brothers Edward Gibbon Wakefield (1796–1862) and William Wakefield (1801– 1848), both closely involved with the colonisation of New Zealand
- Jonas Woodward (1810?–1881), businessman, educationalist, politician, congregational leader and public trustee

=== Reinstated monument after disinterment for motorway ===
- Alexander Turnbull (1868–1918), New Zealand merchant, dandy and book collector

=== Graves moved for motorway construction ===
- Alfred Ludlam (1810–1877), leading New Zealand politician, horticulturist, farmer, philanthropist, and a founder of Wellington's Botanic Garden
- George Macfarlan (1837/38–1868), Member of Parliament representing the Lyttelton electorate

== Friends of Bolton Street Cemetery ==
The Friends of Bolton Street Cemetery is an organisation of volunteers established in 1977 "out of concern for the well-being of the burial sites during and following motorway construction". The group has raised the profile of the cemetery and its heritage value. It helps to maintain the graves, researches historical information and encourages public interest in the cemetery. In the 1990s the Friends undertook a ten-year research project to compile a definitive set of 8,500 burial records for the three parts of Bolton Street Cemetery. The group publishes a newsletter several times a year.
