= Mary Anne Swainson =

New Zealand headmistress

Mary Anne Swainson (1833–1897) was a New Zealand headmistress of Fitzherbert Terrace School.

== Biography ==
She was born in Brough, Westmorland, England in about 1833. She arrived in New Zealand in about 1856.
