= Henry Godfrey (pioneer) =

Henry Godfrey (1824–1882) was an early 19th-century pioneer / settler of Victoria, Australia.

Henry Godfrey 1824-1882

He was born at Madras, India (now Chennai, India) on 4 June 1824, the son of Major John Race Godfrey, an East India Company man, and his wife Jane Octavia, née Woodhouse. Godfrey arrived in Hobart, Tasmania, Australia in 1843 as a young man of 19 years on the ship the Duke of Roxburgh, in company with Francis Russell Nixon, the first Bishop of Tasmania. He subsequently made his way to Victoria and settled on a number of pastoral runs or properties.

An amateur on the violincello, Godfrey was also an accomplished amateur sketcher and his sketchbook, now in the State Library of Victoria, contains hundreds of sketches from the voyage and the colonies, as well as some from England. The collection forms a significant pictorial record of the early colonial period of Port Phillip (Victoria) and Aboriginal life of the period.

Godfrey established himself on the Gobur Station on the Goulburn River (Victoria), the Boort Station on the Loddon River (Victoria), and owned the Nangunia Station near Berrigan in New South Wales, returning to England in 1864, where he died in London in 1882. His eldest son, Henry Polwhele, returned to Australia in 1874, where he died in 1917. Henry's brother, Frederic Race Godfrey, purchased Pevensey Station near Hay in New South Wales and remained in the colony where he became prominent for his public service.

Godfrey married Mary Polwhele in 1853 at St Clements, Truro, Cornwall. They had five children:

- Henry Polwhele Godfrey, born 17 May 1854 in Exeter
- Clarence Polwhele Godfrey, born 14 September 1855 in Exeter
- Ernest William Godfrey, born 28 December 1856 in Melbourne
- Bertram Godfrey, born 1860 at Boort Station, Victoria
- Charles Montague Godfrey, born 29 April 1865 in Cheltenham, Gloucestershire
