= 1974 Lower Hutt mayoral election =

← 1971	12 October 1974	1977 →
- Turnout: 19,461 (47.94%)
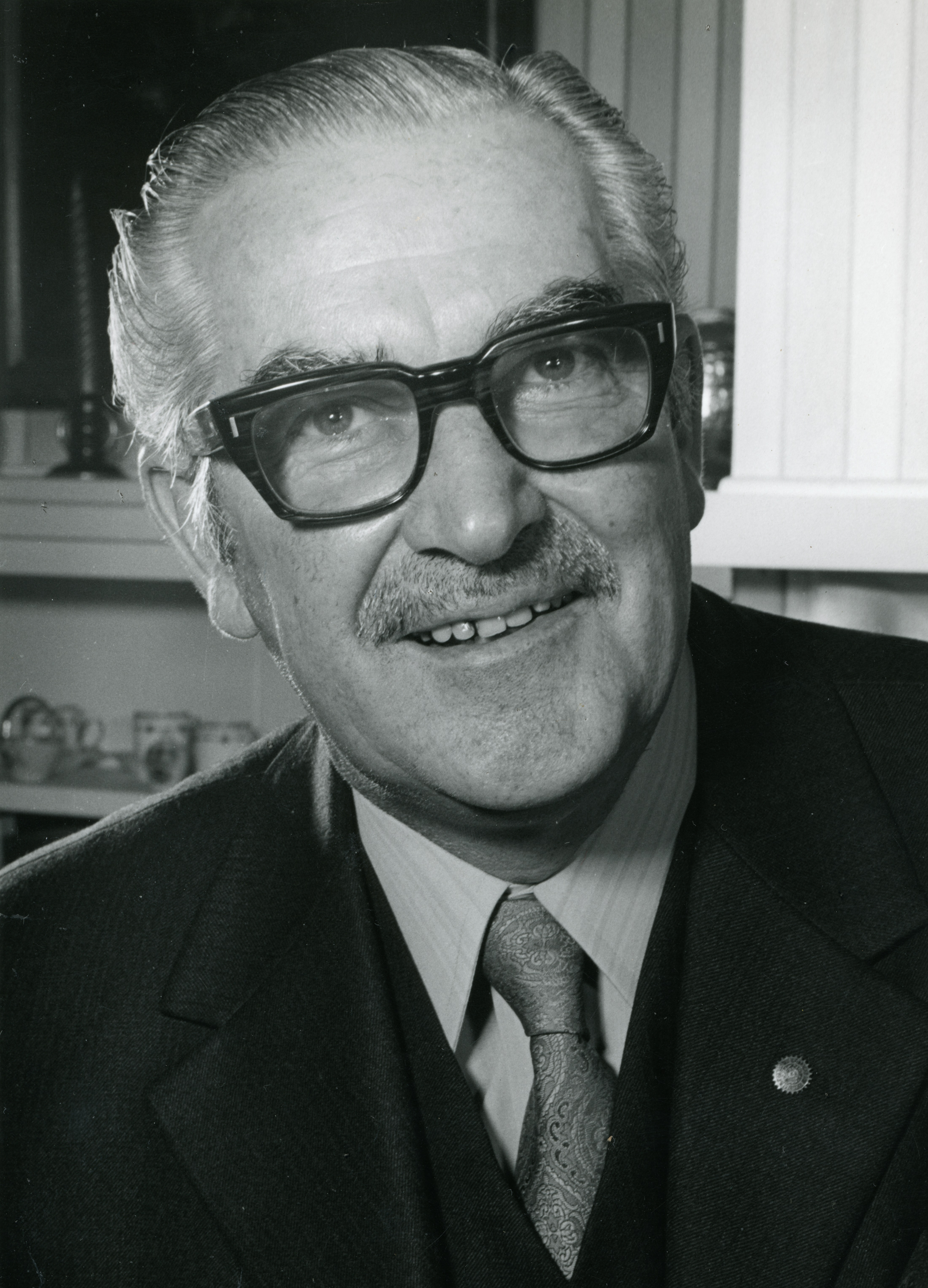

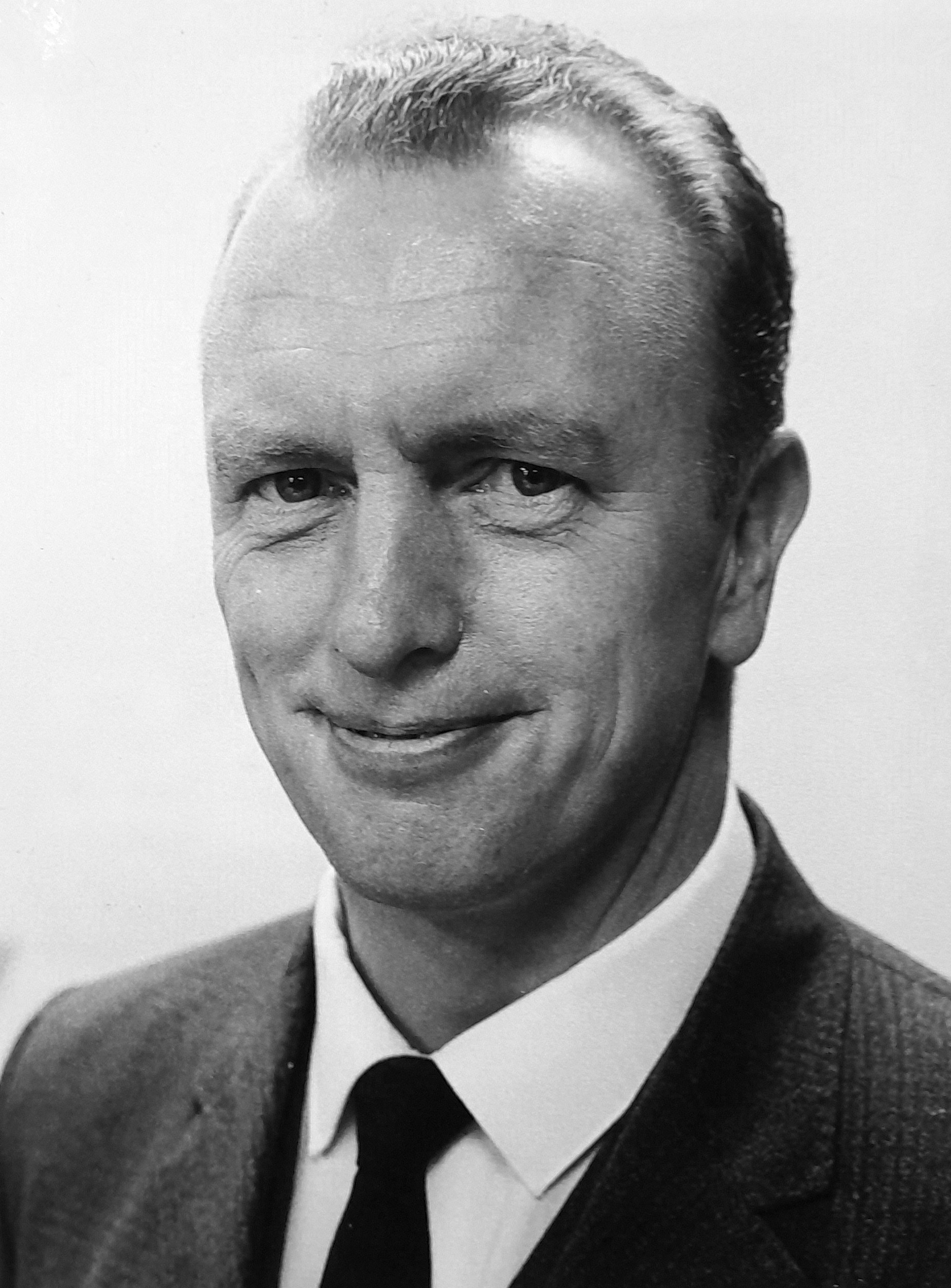
Candidate	John Kennedy-Good	John Seddon
Party	Citizens'	Labour
Popular vote	11,136	8,098
Percentage	57.22	41.62
Mayor before election
John Kennedy-Good
Elected mayor
John Kennedy-Good

The 1974 Lower Hutt mayoral election was part of the New Zealand local elections held that same year. The elections were held for the role of Mayor of Lower Hutt plus other local government positions including sixteen city councillors, also elected triennially. The polling was conducted using the standard first-past-the-post electoral method.

== Background ==
The incumbent Mayor, John Kennedy-Good, stood for a third term. The Citizens' Association had mended its relationship with Kennedy-Good in 1973 and his combined ticket from the previous election had merged back in to the Citizens' Association ticket. The renewed unity helped Kennedy-Good to win a much increased majority against his only challenger, deputy mayor John Seddon, and also for the Citizens' to win a large council majority, where Labour previously held a plurality of seats.

This was the first election in the city after the voting age had been lowered from 20 to 18. Few 18 and 19 year-olds actually voted in the election however and the few that did had come to polling stations together with a parent. According to the chief returning officer the average age of voters at the election was 50.

== Mayoral results ==
1974 Lower Hutt mayoral election
Party	Candidate	Votes	%	±%
Citizens'	John Kennedy-Good	11,136	57.22	+20.06
Labour	John Seddon	8,098	41.62	+7.26
Informal votes		227	1.16	+0.43
Majority		3,038	15.61	+12.81
Turnout		19,461	47.94	+1.79

== Councillor results ==
1974 Lower Hutt City Council election
Party	Candidate	Votes	%	±%
City Ward (15 vacancies)
Citizens'	Chen Werry	10,085	51.82	+12.64
Labour	John Seddon	10,061	51.69	+5.00
Citizens'	Harold Turbott	10,030	51.53	+12.85
Citizens'	Don Lee	9,969	51.22	+10.65
Labour	Govind Bhula	9,921	50.97	+15.47
Citizens'	Teri Puketapu	9,709	49.88	
Labour	Ernie Barry	9,149	47.01	+11.80
Citizens'	Lucy Cole	9,087	46.69	
Labour	Kitty Mildendall	9,066	46.58	+2.41
Labour	Lawrie Woodley	8,885	45.65	+7.72
Citizens'	Ted Gibbs	8,798	45.20	+11.96
Citizens'	Stan Frost	8,689	44.64	+15.61
Citizens'	Jim Ross	8,403	43.17	+13.37
Citizens'	Gerald Bond	8,317	42.73	+10.85
Citizens'	Glen Evans	8,098	41.61	+12.40
Citizens'	Jan Heine	8,020	41.21	
Labour	Les Duckworth	7,893	40.55	+7.85
Labour	Doris Anne Hayward	7,800	40.08	
Labour	Margaret Werry	7,790	40.02	
Labour	Laurie Sutton	7,782	39.98	+9.64
Labour	Francis O'Leary	7,587	39.98	
Labour	Richard John Cummings	7,232	37.16	
Labour	Errol Lynn Hardy	7,224	37.12	
Citizens'	Digby Paape	7,030	36.12	
Labour	Bernard Joseph Randall	6,970	35.81	
Citizens'	Peter Albert Wanden	6,894	35.42	
Citizens'	David James Smith	6,746	34.66	+10.12
Labour	Garry John Joseph Winthrop	6,498	33.38	
Citizens'	Ken Saban	6,158	33.38	
Labour	Anthony Rolf Feinson	6,030	30.98	
Independent	Nick Ursin	3,199	16.43	+3.42
Independent	Martin Nestor	1,749	8.98	
Epuni Ward (1 vacancy)
Independent	Glyn Clayton	unopposed		
