= 1980 Lower Hutt mayoral election =

← 1977	11 October 1980	1983 →
- Turnout: (18,053 46.00%)
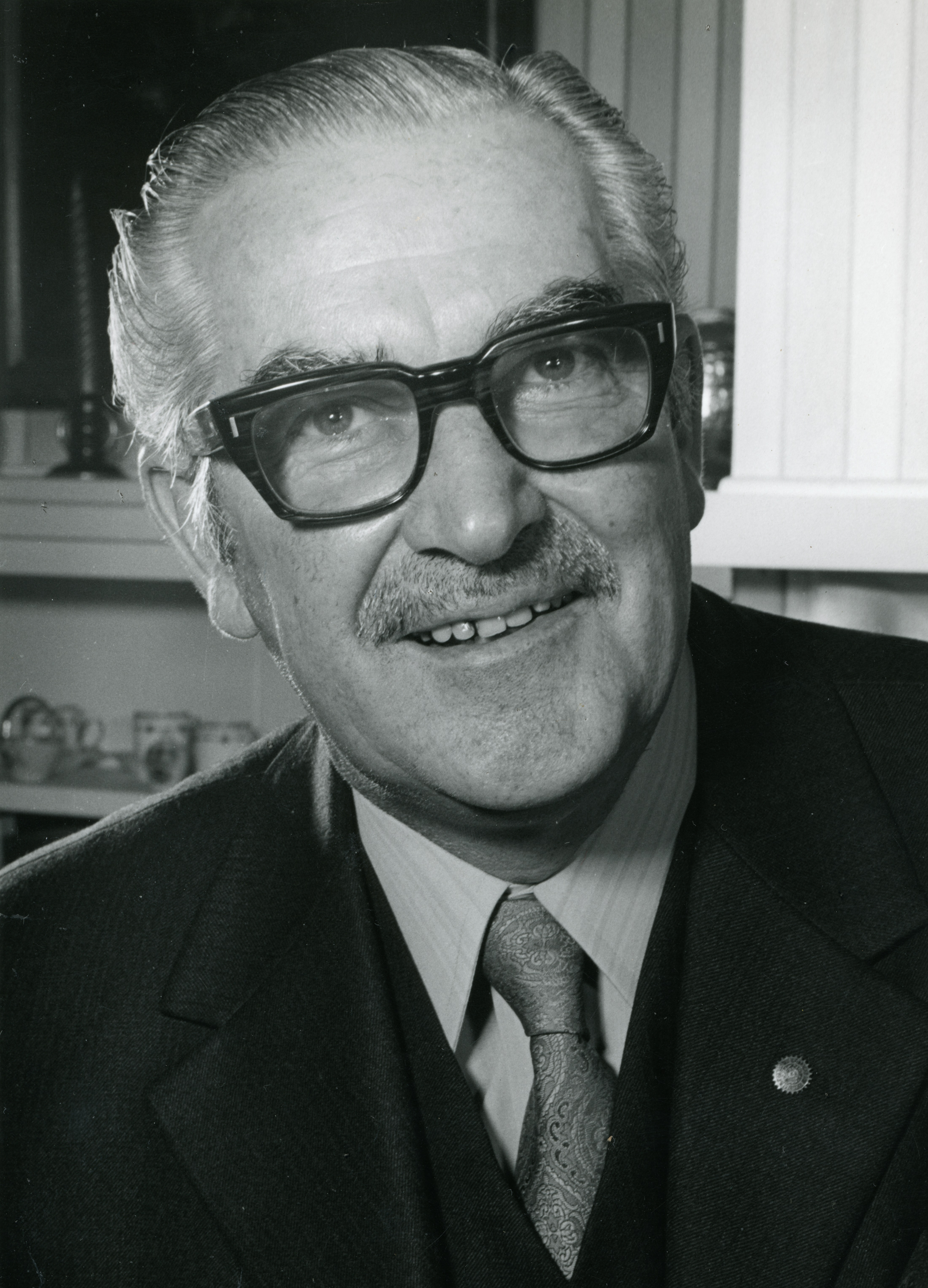

Candidate	John Kennedy-Good	Ernie Barry
Party	United Citizens	Labour
Popular vote	10,906	5,753
Percentage	60.41	31.86
Mayor before election
John Kennedy-Good
Elected mayor
John Kennedy-Good

The 1980 Lower Hutt mayoral election was part of the New Zealand local elections held that same year. The elections were held for the role of Mayor of Lower Hutt plus other local government positions including sixteen city councillors, also elected triennially. The polling was conducted using the standard first-past-the-post electoral method.

== Background ==
The incumbent Mayor, John Kennedy-Good, stood for a fifth term and was re-elected alongside a nearly all-United Citizens council. This included ex-Labour councillor Lawrie Woodley who had defected to the United Citizens mid-term and was rewarded after the 1980 election by Kennedy-Good with a committee chairman position.

== Mayoral results ==
1980 Lower Hutt mayoral election
Party	Candidate	Votes	%	±%
United Citizens	John Kennedy-Good	10,906	60.41	+8.22
Labour	Ernie Barry	5,753	31.86	−10.24
Independent	Nick Ursin	987	5.46	+1.54
Informal votes		407	2.25	+0.42
Majority		5,153	28.54	+18.46
Turnout		18,053	46.00	+3.00

== Councillor results ==
1980 Lower Hutt City Council election
Party	Candidate	Votes	%	±%
United Citizens	Mollie Ngan-Kee	11,217	62.13	+4.52
United Citizens	Don Lee	10,204	56.52	−0.41
United Citizens	Lucy Cole	9,738	53.94	+1.05
United Citizens	Teri Puketapu	9,547	52.88	−2.03
United Citizens	Gerald Bond	9,251	51.24	+2.47
United Citizens	Roger Twentyman	8,927	49.44	
United Citizens	Lawrie Woodley	8,896	49.27	+0.57
United Citizens	Chen Werry	8,864	49.09	−1.66
United Citizens	Harold Turbott	8,721	48.30	−3.08
United Citizens	John Barker	8,700	48.19	
United Citizens	Lois Risley	8,690	48.13	
United Citizens	Helen Thorstenson	8,603	47.65	
United Citizens	David Ogden	8,424	46.66	
Labour	John Terris	8,243	45.66	−8.03
United Citizens	Rowland Crone	8,233	45.60	
United Citizens	Henry Martens	7,663	42.44	
Labour	Ernie Barry	7,567	41.91	−16.98
Labour	Jan Taylor	7,247	40.14	−10.95
Labour	Alister Abernethy	7,174	39.73	−11.34
United Citizens	Toaiga Magele	6,949	38.49	
Labour	John Eaton	6,439	35.66	
Labour	Sandra Nolan	6,425	35.58	
Labour	Richard Luke	6,358	35.21	
Labour	Michael Jamieson	6,355	35.20	
Labour	David Taylor	6,012	33.30	
Labour	Muriel Powell	6,008	33.27	
Labour	Walter Clement	5,840	32.34	
Labour	Neil Tynan	5,497	30.44	−11.17
Labour	Norman Woodgate	5,427	30.06	
Labour	Peter Petterson	5,392	29.86	
Labour	Ellen Te Moni	5,373	29.76	
Labour	Evelyn Richter	5,288	29.29	
Independent	Doug Whitcher	3,418	18.93	
Independent	Nick Ursin	3,053	16.91	−3.13
Independent	Lesley Buckley	2,790	15.45	
Independent	Rangi Bailey	2,534	14.03	
Independent	Patricia May Lodge	2,348	13.00	−4.03
Independent	Harald Pies-Lintz	1,731	9.58	
Values	William Wayne Hennessy	1,553	8.60	
