= 1968 Lower Hutt mayoral election =

← 1965	12 October 1968	1971 →
- Turnout: 14,063 (43.01%)
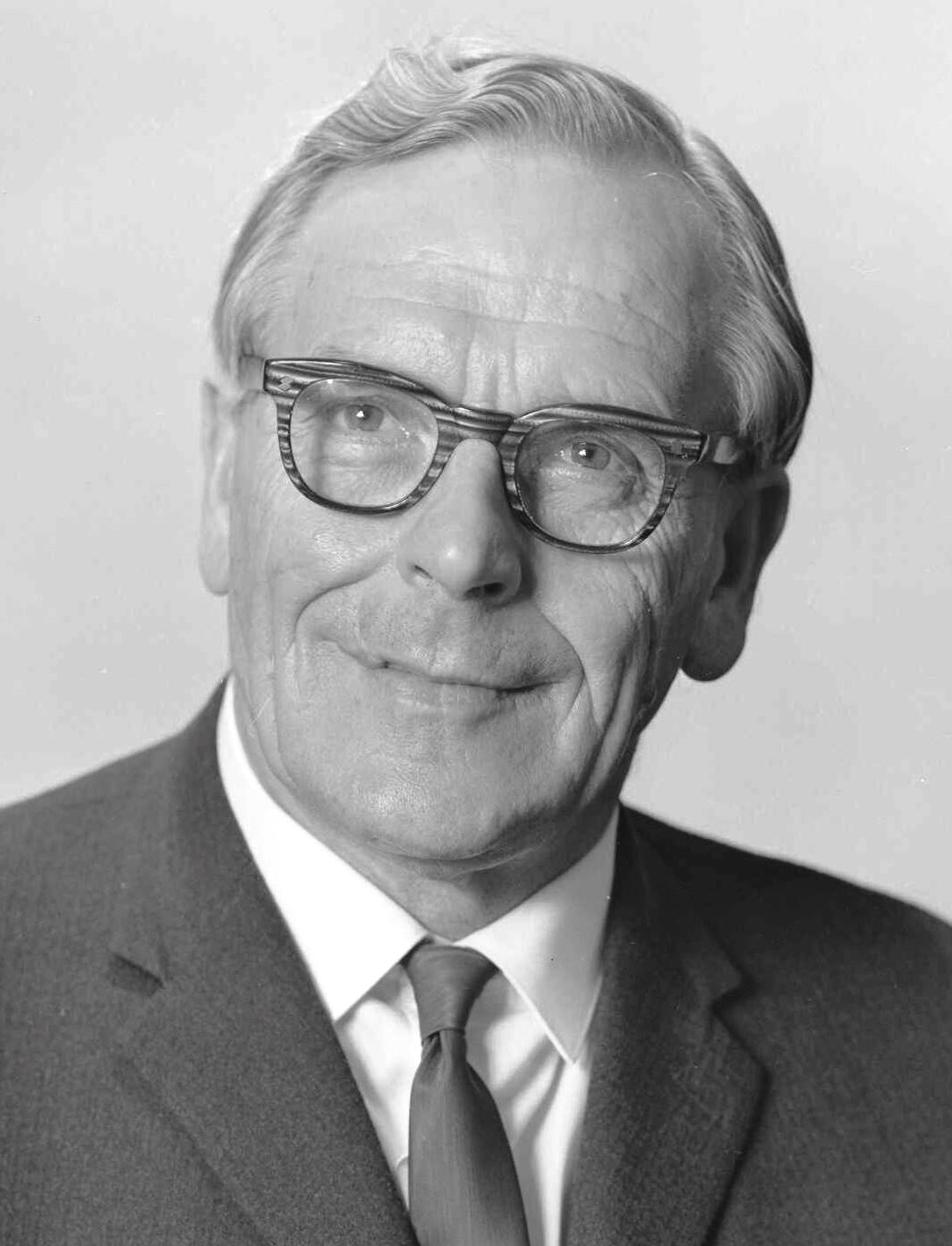

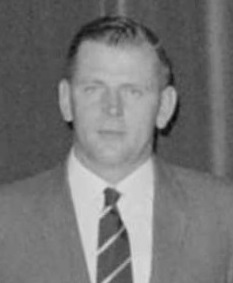
Candidate	Percy Dowse	Dave Hadley
Party	Labour	Citizens'
Popular vote	7,241	6,629
Percentage	51.48	47.13
Mayor before election
Percy Dowse
Elected mayor
Percy Dowse

The 1968 Lower Hutt mayoral election was part of the New Zealand local elections held that same year. The elections were held for the role of Mayor of Lower Hutt plus other local government positions including fifteen city councillors, also elected triennially. The polling was conducted using the standard first-past-the-post electoral method.

== Background ==
The incumbent Mayor, Percy Dowse, sought re-election for a seventh term. He was opposed by Citizens' Association councillor Dave Hadley. Initially John Kennedy-Good was favoured as the Citizens' mayoral candidate, but as he had in 1965, he refused to challenge Dowse. Additionally he cited his intention to stand for parliament as the National Party candidate for the Hutt electorate at the upcoming 1969 general election as being incompatible with the mayoralty. Dowse, who was returned unopposed in the previous election, had a large reduction in his majority. The Labour Party lost its majority on the council (three sitting councillors lost their seats) with a large swing to Citizens' candidates.

== Mayoral results ==
1968 Lower Hutt mayoral election
Party	Candidate	Votes	%	±%
Labour	Percy Dowse	7,241	51.48	
Citizens'	Dave Hadley	6,629	47.13	
Informal votes		193	1.37	
Majority		612	4.35	
Turnout		14,063	43.01	

== Councillor results ==
1968 Lower Hutt City Council election
Party	Candidate	Votes	%	±%
Citizens'	Dave Hadley	8,260	58.73	+8.69
Citizens'	John Kennedy-Good	8,195	58.27	+1.43
Labour	Chen Werry	7,876	56.00	−5.35
Citizens'	Don Lee	7,540	53.61	+4.61
Citizens'	Ted Holdaway	7,347	52.24	
Citizens'	Stan Frost	7,104	50.51	
Labour	Sam Chesney	6,988	49.69	−8.46
Labour	Kitty Mildenhall	6,849	48.70	−5.39
Labour	Jessie Donald	6,717	47.76	−8.28
Citizens'	Cyril Phelps	6,654	47.31	+18.03
Citizens'	Ted Gibbs	6,583	46.81	+1.64
Labour	Wally Bugden	6,517	46.34	−12.00
Citizens'	Max Borra	6,442	45.80	
Citizens'	Jim Ross	6,406	45.55	
Citizens'	Harold Meachen	6,210	44.15	
Labour	David Carrad	5,967	42.43	−8.75
Citizens'	Joseph David Peters	5,927	42.14	
Labour	William Harvey	5,891	41.89	−8.58
Labour	Joan Mary Pearce	5,889	41.87	−6.16
Labour	Bert Sutherland	5,880	41.81	−7.88
Citizens'	Peter James Stevens	5,851	41.60	
Citizens'	William Davidson Smith	5,677	40.36	
Citizens'	Andrew George Gathergood	5,491	39.04	
Labour	Ronald Edward Alexander Annan	5,482	38.98	
Labour	Edward William Harnett	5,142	36.56	
Labour	William Mouat McLaren	5,120	36.40	−11.26
Citizens'	Peter Edwin Grenside	5,080	36.12	
Labour	William John Jarvis	5,064	36.00	−8.28
Labour	John Alan Nelsson Ivory	5,028	35.75	
Labour	George John Ravelich	4,831	34.35	
Independent	Unah Lovell Archibald	2,604	18.51	
Independent	Nick Ursin	2,348	16.69	
