= 1977 Lower Hutt mayoral election =

← 1974	8 October 1977	1980 →
- Turnout: 18,446 (43.00%)
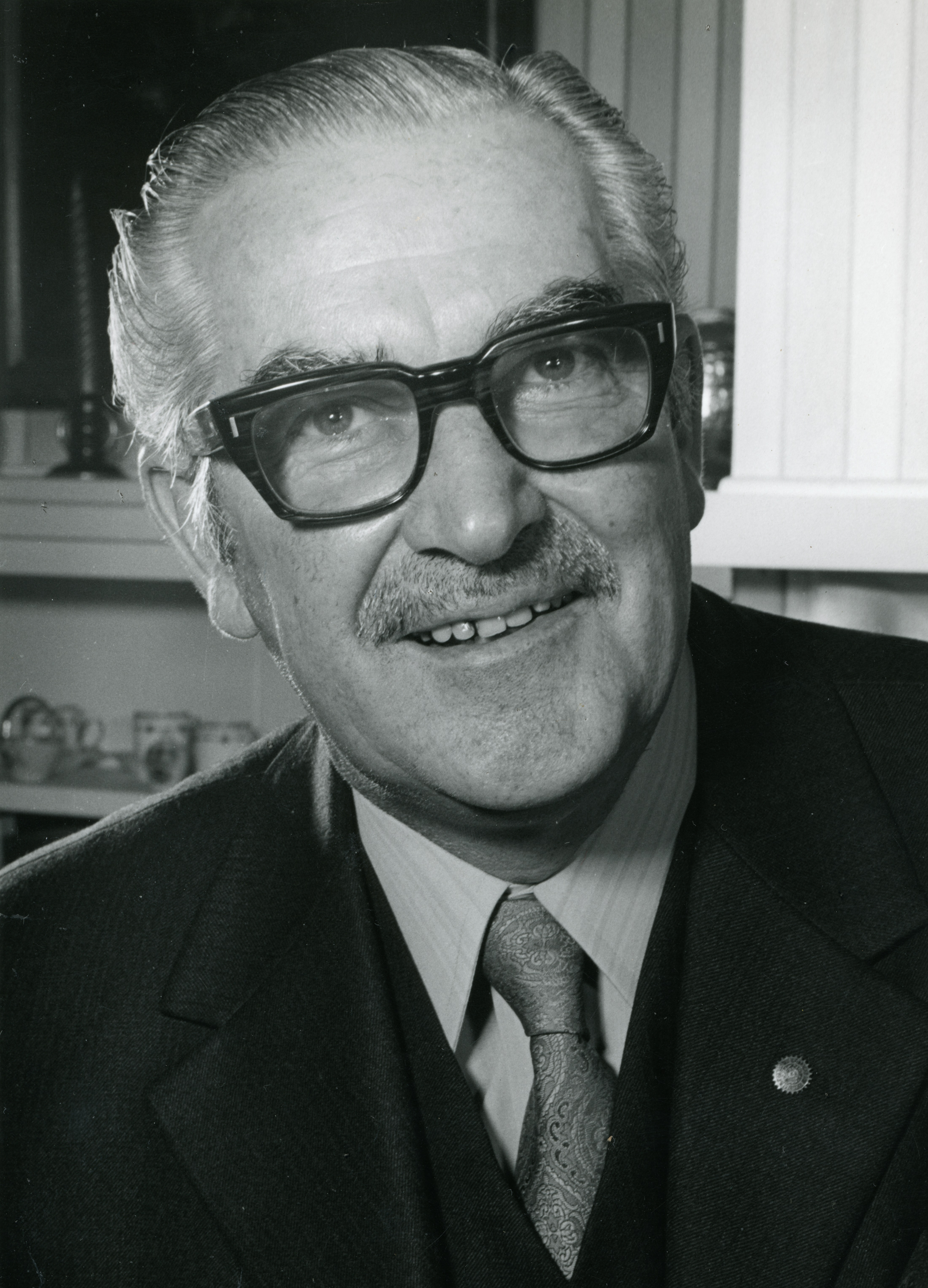

Candidate	John Kennedy-Good	Ernie Barry
Party	Citizens'	Labour
Popular vote	9,627	7,767
Percentage	52.19	42.10
Mayor before election
John Kennedy-Good
Elected mayor
John Kennedy-Good

The 1977 Lower Hutt mayoral election was part of the New Zealand local elections held that same year. The elections were held for the role of Mayor of Lower Hutt plus other local government positions including sixteen city councillors, also elected triennially. The polling was conducted using the standard first-past-the-post electoral method.

== Background ==
The incumbent Mayor, John Kennedy-Good, stood for a fourth term. The election was held after major flooding in December 1976. The council did not have the resources to fix the damages and had to ask the government for assistance. Prime Minister Robert Muldoon visited the flood affected areas, however antagonisms between Muldoon and some Labour Party councillors led to the funds being delayed. Once they came through the council was able to help the neighbourhoods affected. In the aftermath the council struggled to cope with building consenting administration in the flood affected areas. This caused voters to perceive the council as inept on the issue. The situation harmed Kennedy-Good who suffered a much decreased majority against his main challenger, councillor Ernie Barry, and also the Citizens' lost their large council majority, with the Labour Party winning a majority of seats. Labour's majority went down from 2 seats to 1 when councillor Lawrie Woodley defected to the Citizens' mid-term.

== Mayoral results ==
1977 Lower Hutt mayoral election
Party	Candidate	Votes	%	±%
Citizens'	John Kennedy-Good	9,627	52.19	−5.03
Labour	Ernie Barry	7,767	42.10	
Independent	Nick Ursin	724	3.92	
Informal votes		338	1.83	+0.67
Majority		1,860	10.08	−5.53
Turnout		18,446	43.00	−4.94

== Councillor results ==
1977 Lower Hutt City Council election
Party	Candidate	Votes	%	±%
Labour	Ernie Barry	9,955	58.89	+11.88
Citizens'	Mollie Ngan-Kee	9,738	57.61	
Citizens'	Don Lee	9,624	56.93	+5.71
Labour	John Seddon	9,622	56.92	+5.23
Labour	Margaret Werry	9,324	55.16	+15.14
Citizens'	Teri Puketapu	9,283	54.91	+5.03
Labour	John Terris	9,076	53.69	
Citizens'	Lucy Cole	8,940	52.89	+6.20
Labour	Govind Bhula	8,922	52.78	+1.81
Citizens'	Harold Turbott	8,685	51.38	+0.05
Labour	Jan Taylor	8,637	51.09	
Labour	Alister Abernethy	8,633	51.07	
Labour	Jane Fage	8,598	50.86	
Citizens'	Chen Werry	8,579	50.75	−1.07
Labour	Lawrie Woodley	8,426	49.84	+4.19
Citizens'	Gerald Bond	8,244	48.77	+6.04
Citizens'	Jessie Donald	8,241	48.75	
Citizens'	Glyn Clayton	8,056	47.66	
Labour	Errol Lynn Hardy	8,020	47.44	+10.32
Labour	David Brian Carrad	8,009	47.38	
Citizens'	Stan Frost	7,953	47.05	−2.41
Citizens'	Ted Gibbs	7,932	46.92	+1.72
Citizens'	Jim Ross	7,693	45.51	+2.34
Labour	Geoffrey Taylor	7,380	43.66	
Labour	Edward James Bernishaw	7,322	43.31	
Labour	Paul Ian Pearson	7,314	43.27	
Citizens'	Alf Harding	7,294	43.15	
Citizens'	Peter George	7,158	42.34	
Citizens'	Ned Dobbs	7,088	41.93	
Labour	Neal Tynan	7,035	41.61	
Citizens'	Ken Saban	6,764	40.01	+6.63
Labour	Eugieniusz Zajkowski	6,643	39.30	
Independent	Nick Ursin	3,389	20.04	+3.61
Independent	Patricia May Lodge	2,880	17.03	
