= 1971 Lower Hutt mayoral election =

← 1968	9 October 1971	1974 →
- Turnout: 18,440 (46.15%)
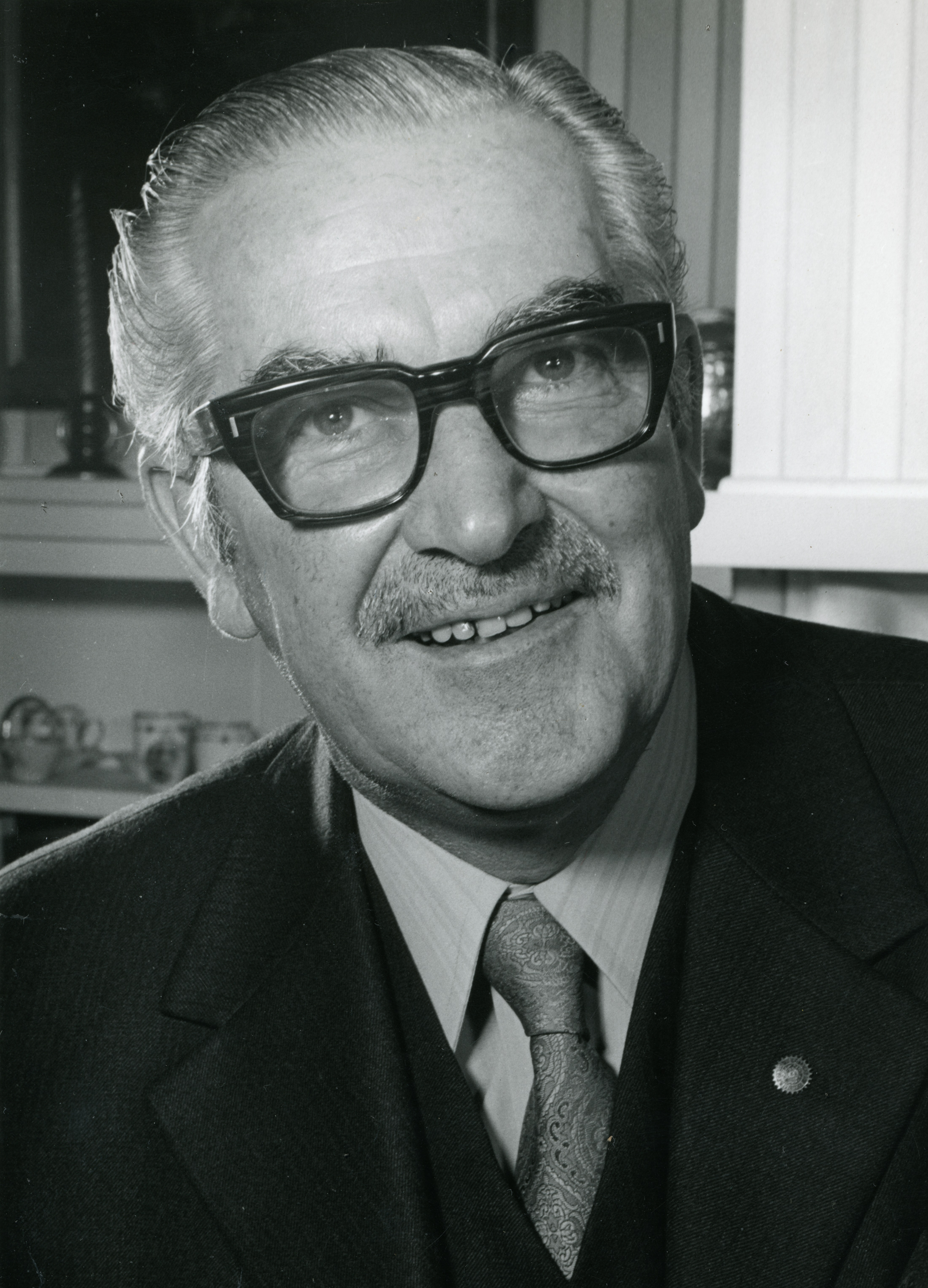

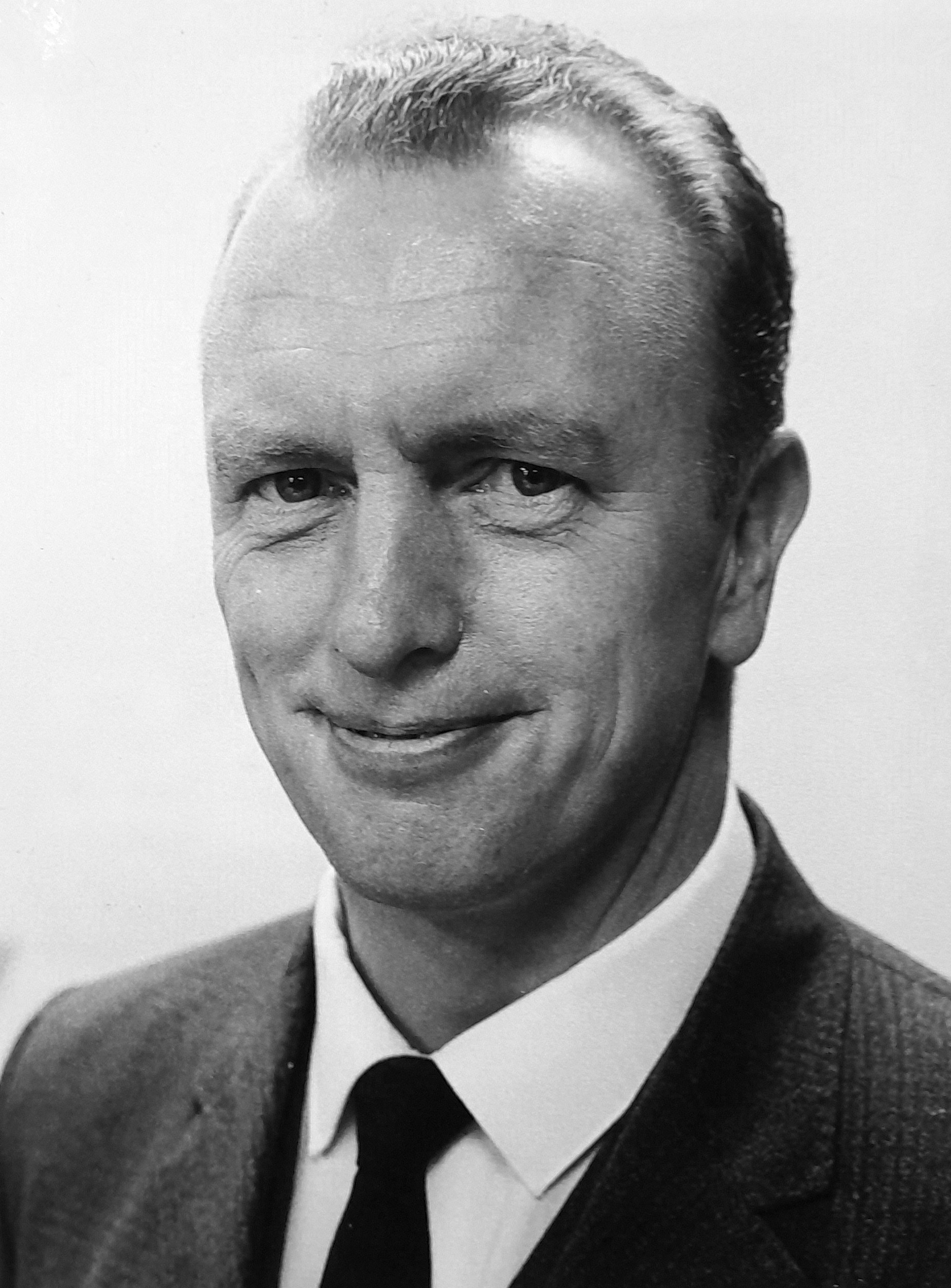

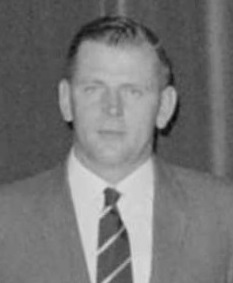
Candidate	John Kennedy-Good	John Seddon	Dave Hadley
Party	Combined Team	Labour	Citizens'
Popular vote	6,854	6,337	4,630
Percentage	37.16	34.36	25.10
Mayor before election
John Kennedy-Good
Elected mayor
John Kennedy-Good

The 1971 Lower Hutt mayoral election was part of the New Zealand local elections held that same year. The elections were held for the role of Mayor of Lower Hutt plus other local government positions including fifteen city councillors, also elected triennially. The polling was conducted using the standard first-past-the-post electoral method.

== Background ==
=== 1970 mid-term election ===
Mayor Percy Dowse died mid-term on 9 December 1970. Rather than hold a by-election the city council members decided to elect a councillor to finish the remainder of the term until the scheduled election 10 months later. The council special meeting was held on 21 December. Councillor Chen Werry was nominated by Wally Bugden and seconded by Jessie Donald but he unexpectedly declined nomination. Cyril Phelps then nominated John Kennedy-Good which was seconded by Harold Meachen and finally the deputy mayor Dave Hadley was nominated by Ted Holdaway and seconded by Don Lee. A vote was held among the councillors by a show of hands. A visible split was seen with Citizens' Association councillors, splitting support between Hadley and Kennedy-Good, with Labour councillors (who were the minority on the council) all voting for Kennedy-Good who won nine votes to six.

A list of each Councillors vote:

Councillor	Mayoral Vote
Max Borra	Hadley
Wally Bugden	Kennedy-Good
Sam Chesney	Kennedy-Good
Jessie Donald	Kennedy-Good
Stan Frost	Hadley
Ted Gibbs	Kennedy-Good
Dave Hadley	Hadley
Ted Holdaway	Hadley
John Kennedy-Good	Kennedy-Good
Don Lee	Hadley
Harold Meachen	Kennedy-Good
Kitty Mildenhall	Kennedy-Good
Cyril Phelps	Kennedy-Good
Jim Ross	Hadley
Chen Werry	Kennedy-Good

=== October 1971 election ===
Even after councillors elected Kennedy-Good as Dowse's successor the Citizens' Association, who had a majority on the council, did not select Kennedy-Good for the 1971 election. Instead they chose the deputy mayor (and 1968 candidate) Dave Hadley instead. As a result Kennedy-Good formed his own "combined" electoral ticket, consisting of candidates who were previously Citizens' and Labour affiliated, with which to contest the election. Thinking that the Labour Party was not intending to put up a ticket of their own, four Labour councillors joined the combined team. Labour did eventually decide to run its own ticket and party policy dictated that members could not stand for election against official party candidates resulting them having their Labour membership suspended.

In an evenly divided poll Kennedy-Good narrowly edged out former Labour councillor John Seddon to win the mayoralty. The city council was split three ways, with Labour winning a plurality of seats. Labour and Citizens' councillors made a deal to elect their own members to committee chairs and voted Seddon as deputy mayor, sidelining the Combined Team.

At the election both a father and son were elected to the council. Chen Werry was re-elected to the council on the combined ticket while his son, Dick Werry, won a seat on the Labour ticket. It also saw the election of the city's first ever Indian councillor, Govind Bhula, a civil engineer originally from Bombay.

== Mayoral results ==
1971 Lower Hutt mayoral election
Party	Candidate	Votes	%	±%
Combined Team	John Kennedy-Good	6,854	37.16	
Labour	John Seddon	6,337	34.36	
Citizens'	Dave Hadley	4,630	25.10	−22.03
Independent	Nick Ursin	484	2.62	
Informal votes		135	0.73	−0.64
Majority		517	2.80	
Turnout		18,440	46.15	+3.14

== Councillor results ==
1971 Lower Hutt City Council election
Party	Candidate	Votes	%	±%
Labour	John Seddon	8,610	46.69	
Labour	Kitty Mildenhall	8,146	44.17	−4.53
Citizens'	Don Lee	7,482	40.57	−13.04
Combined Team	Chen Werry	7,225	39.18	−16.82
Citizens'	Harold Turbott	7,133	38.68	
Combined Team	Sam Chesney	7,018	38.05	−11.64
Labour	Lawrie Woodley	6,995	37.93	
Citizens'	Andrew Ash	6,860	37.20	
Combined Team	Jessie Donald	6,737	36.53	−11.23
Labour	Govind Bhula	6,548	35.50	
Labour	Ernie Barry	6,494	35.21	
Combined Team	Stan Ramsom	6,344	34.40	
Labour	Dick Werry	6,258	33.93	
Combined Team	Ted Gibbs	6,130	33.24	−13.57
Labour	Les Duckworth	6,030	32.70	
Citizens'	Francis John Cameron	5,974	32.39	
Labour	David Carrad	5,966	32.35	−10.08
Combined Team	Cyril Phelps	5,934	32.18	−15.13
Combined Team	Gerald Bond	5,879	31.88	
Citizens'	Max Borra	5,693	30.87	−14.93
Labour	Jack Ward	5,612	30.43	
Labour	Bert Sutherland	5,597	30.35	−11.46
Labour	Laurie Sutton	5,596	30.34	
Combined Team	Jim Ross	5,496	29.80	−15.75
Labour	Peter Gordon Palmer	5,458	29.59	
Labour	Laurence Phillip Lowe	5,391	29.23	
Combined Team	Glen Evans	5,388	29.21	
Citizens'	Stan Frost	5,354	29.03	−21.48
Labour	Alick Shaw	5,221	28.31	
Combined Team	David Kincaid	4,807	26.06	
Combined Team	Vince Fitzgibbon	4,654	25.23	
Combined Team	Eric Pearce	4,564	24.75	
Citizens'	David James Smith	4,526	24.54	
Combined Team	Keith Thomas	4,427	24.00	
Citizens'	Parone Matiu	4,405	23.88	
Labour	Graeme Smith	4,354	23.61	
Citizens'	Sadie Williams	4,254	23.06	
Combined Team	Bill Lambert	4,197	22.76	
Combined Team	Ray Partridge	4,183	22.68	
Citizens'	George Ian Hooper	3,872	20.99	
Citizens'	Raymond Joseph McLaughlin	3,823	20.73	
Citizens'	Joseph David Peters	3,717	20.15	
Citizens'	Robert McMurray	3,665	19.87	
Citizens'	Charles Edward Maxted	3,624	19.65	
Citizens'	Andrew George Gathergood	3,540	19.19	−19.85
Independent	Nick Ursin	2,400	13.01	−3.68
Independent	Anthony Francis Foot	1,780	9.65	
