= 1962 Lower Hutt mayoral election =

← 1959	13 October 1962	1965 →
- Turnout: 13,586 (45.28%)
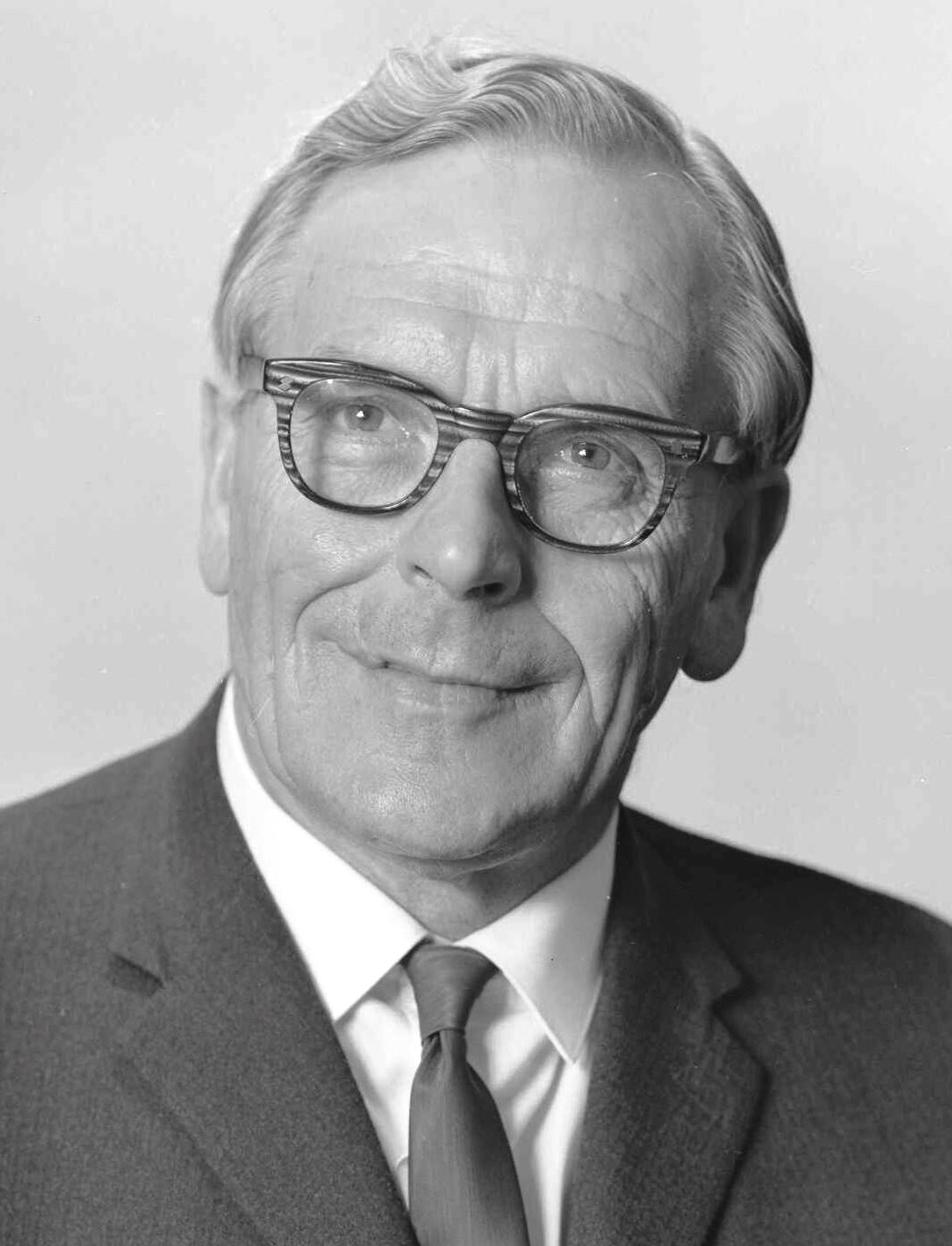

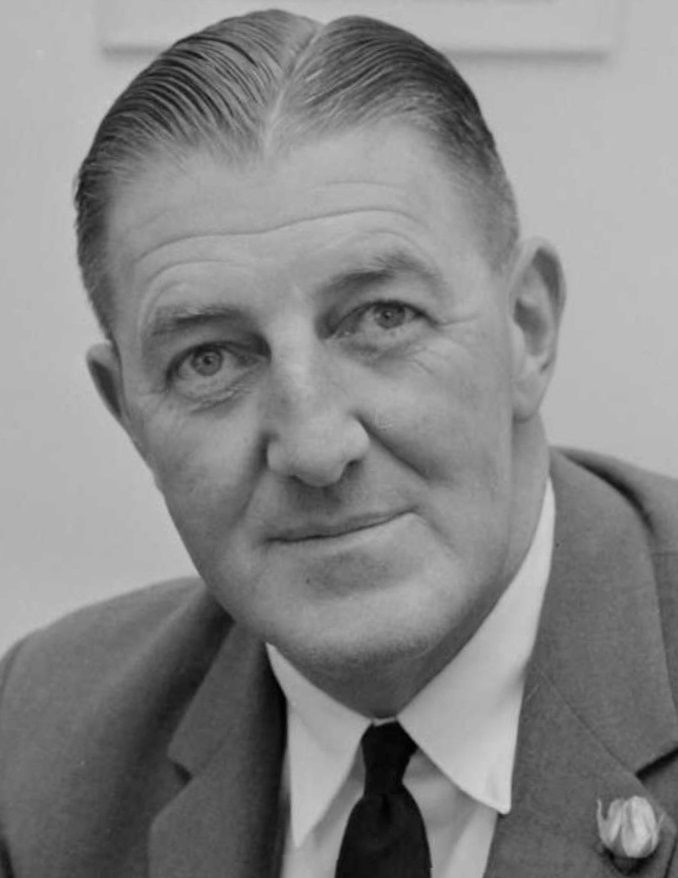
Candidate	Percy Dowse	George Barker
Party	Labour	Independent
Popular vote	8,367	5,137
Percentage	61.58	37.81
Mayor before election
Percy Dowse
Elected mayor
Percy Dowse

The 1962 Lower Hutt mayoral election was part of the New Zealand local elections held that same year. The elections were held for the role of Mayor of Lower Hutt plus other local government positions including fifteen city councillors, also elected triennially. The polling was conducted using the standard first-past-the-post electoral method.

== Background ==
The incumbent Mayor, Percy Dowse, sought re-election for a fifth term. Dowse was opposed by the deputy mayor George Llewellyn Barker who stood as an independent candidate. Barker had been a councillor and member of the Wellington Harbour Board since 1959 and had recently contested the parliamentary seat of Hutt at the 1960 election for the National Party. Just as in the previous two elections the Citizens' Association did not stand an official ticket of candidates and endorsed a slate of independents. The Ratepayer Independents lost all but three seats with the Labour Party regaining their majority on the council. The main issue of the previous election was the council's finances with Dowse criticised over a NZ£75,000 loan for the second stage of the Maungaraki development. Since then the financial situation had been evaluated and the City Treasurer's report in April 1961 established that the council's accounts were healthy with the Ratepayer Independents criticisms being over-exaggerated. This news helped Dowse and Labour make a strong comeback in the election.

== Mayoral results ==
1962 Lower Hutt mayoral election
Party	Candidate	Votes	%	±%
Labour	Percy Dowse	8,367	61.58	+1.07
Independent	George Barker	5,137	37.81	
Informal votes		82	0.60	−1.93
Majority		3,230	23.77	+0.21
Turnout		13,586	45.28	+6.46

== Councillor results ==
1962 Lower Hutt City Council election
Party	Candidate	Votes	%	±%
Labour	Trevor Young	7,554	55.60	−14.84
Labour	Sam Chesney	7,391	54.40	+0.64
Labour	Chen Werry	7,144	52.58	−15.14
Labour	Jessie Donald	7,114	52.36	−14.96
Labour	Joe Aspell	6,850	50.41	
Labour	Alexander Campbell	6,595	48.54	
Labour	Wally Bugden	6,587	48.48	−16.18
Labour	Walter Fraser	6,525	48.02	−0.53
Labour	Wally Mildenhall	6,524	48.02	−1.79
Independent	John Kennedy-Good	6,415	47.21	
Independent	Ted Holdaway	6,185	45.52	
Labour	William Harvey	6,179	45.48	
Labour	Bert Sutherland	6,149	45.25	−2.41
Labour	William Mouat McLaren	5,920	43.57	−2.82
Independent	Dave Hadley	5,867	43.18	−8.67
Independent	James Roderick Murray	5,864	43.16	
Independent	Stan Frost	5,709	42.02	
Independent	Donald Marshall Wilson	5,693	41.90	−11.51
Independent Labour	James McDonald	5,685	41.84	−27.31
Independent	Cyril Phelps	5,642	41.52	−15.08
Labour	Allan Patrick Ryan	5,574	41.02	−1.82
Independent	Don Lee	5,572	41.01	
Independent	Harold George Cole	5,510	40.55	
Independent	Hugh McKinnon Smith	5,451	40.12	
Independent	James Kawarau Horn	5,442	40.05	
Labour	Joseph Stanislaus O'Brien	5,436	40.01	−1.14
Independent	Keith Thomas	5,334	39.26	−13.39
Labour	Morris Gordon Castree	5,132	37.77	
Independent	Alwin Atkinson	4,829	35.54	−23.89
