= 1983 Lower Hutt mayoral election =

Municipal election in New Zealand

- 8 October 1983
- Turnout: (16,746 42.00%)
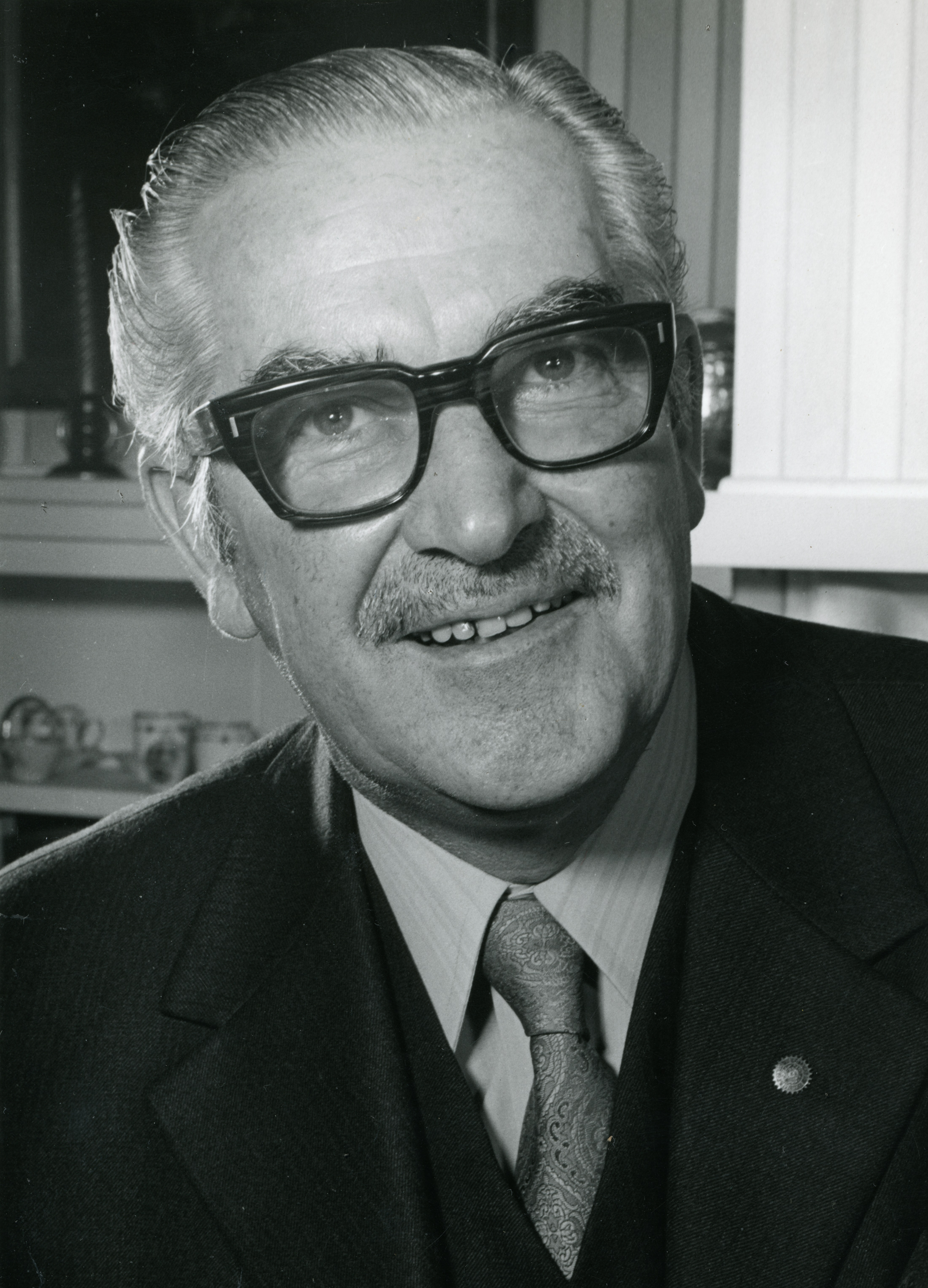

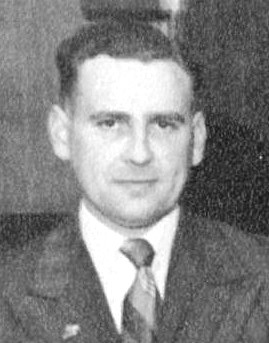

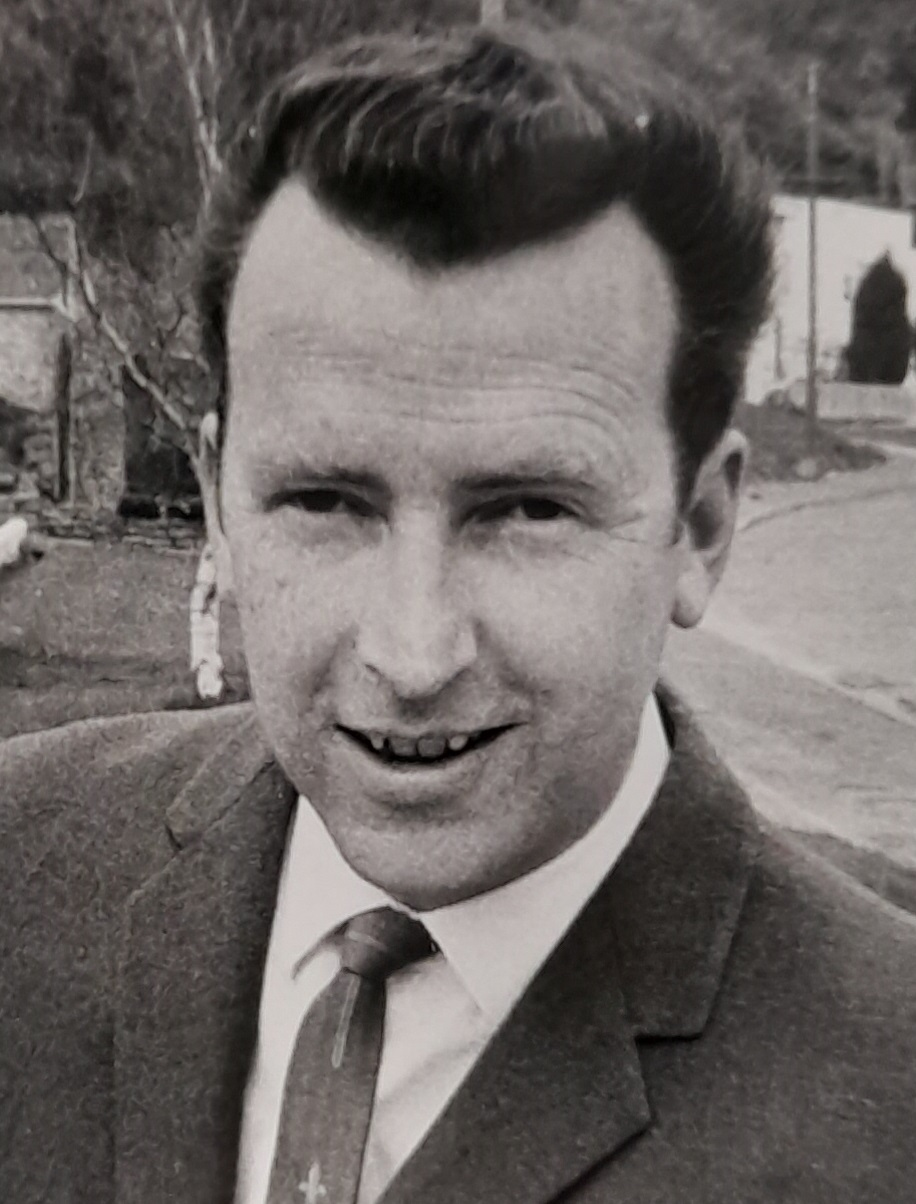
Candidate	John Kennedy-Good	Alister Abernethy	Don Lee
Party	United Citizens	Labour	Independent
Popular vote	8,261	3,961	3,653
Percentage	49.33	23.65	21.81
Mayor before election
John Kennedy-Good
Elected mayor
John Kennedy-Good

The 1983 Lower Hutt mayoral election was part of the 1983 New Zealand local elections held that same year. The elections were held for the role of Mayor of Lower Hutt plus other local government positions including sixteen city councillors, also elected triennially. The polling was conducted using the standard first-past-the-post electoral method.

== Background ==
The incumbent Mayor, John Kennedy-Good, stood for a sixth term and was successful. The Labour Party made a modest recovery from its 1980 result, winning three extra seats. Former United Citizens councillor Don Lee severed his links with the ticket to run for the mayoralty. As an independent he was defeated for mayor as well as losing his seat on the city council and Hutt Valley Energy Board (the latter of which he was chairman of). He did however manage to retain his seat on the Wellington Regional Council (which Kennedy-Good was also elected to).

== Mayoral results ==
1983 Lower Hutt mayoral election
Party	Candidate	Votes	%	±%
United Citizens	John Kennedy-Good	8,261	49.33	−11.08
Labour	Alister Abernethy	3,961	23.65	
Independent	Don Lee	3,653	21.81	
Independent	Doug Whitcher	629	3.75	
Informal votes		242	1.44	−0.81
Majority		4,300	25.67	−2.87
Turnout		16,746	42.00	−4.00

== Councillor results ==
1983 Lower Hutt City Council election
Party	Candidate	Votes	%	±%
Labour	John Terris	9,156	60.47	+14.81
United Citizens	Lucy Cole	8,646	57.11	+3.17
United Citizens	Gerald Bond	8,432	55.69	+4.45
United Citizens	Teri Puketapu	8,432	55.69	+2.81
United Citizens	Lois Riseley	8,375	55.32	+7.19
United Citizens	Roger Twentyman	8,030	53.04	+3.60
United Citizens	Helen Thorstenson	8,025	53.00	+5.35
United Citizens	Lawrie Woodley	7,749	51.18	+1.91
United Citizens	David Ogden	7,653	50.55	+3.89
United Citizens	Margaret Cousins	7,603	50.22	
Labour	Jan Taylor	7,498	49.52	+9.38
Labour	Alister Abernethy	7,434	49.10	+9.37
United Citizens	Ted Gibbs	7,385	48.78	
Labour	Chen Werry	7,238	47.81	−1.28
United Citizens	Errol Baird	7,081	46.77	
United Citizens	Chris MacKay	6,946	45.88	
Independent	Don Lee	6,808	44.96	−11.56
United Citizens	Russell Cockburn	6,741	44.52	
United Citizens	Henri Martens	6,697	44.23	+1.79
United Citizens	Rowland Crone	6,570	43.39	−2.21
United Citizens	Bernard Feehan	6,493	42.88	
Labour	Neville Pickering	6,328	41.79	
Labour	John Eaton	6,275	41.44	+5.78
Labour	Elsie Broom	5,980	39.50	
Labour	Richard Luke	5,945	39.26	+4.05
Labour	David Taylor	5,675	37.48	+4.18
Labour	Ian Jenkin	5,571	36.79	
Labour	Patrick O'Hagan	5,502	36.34	
Labour	Peter Lorimer	5,463	36.08	
Labour	Ian Reid	5,313	35.09	
Labour	Tafa Malifa-Poutoa	5,271	34.81	
Labour	Alan McMillain	5,214	34.44	
Labour	Peter Petterson	4,971	32.83	+2.97
Independent	Doug Whitcher	4,161	27.48	+8.55
Unemployed Workers	John Forman	2,104	13.89	
Unemployed Workers	Dave Macpherson	2,076	13.71	
