= 1995 Hutt City Council election =

Local elections in New Zealand

- 14 October 1995
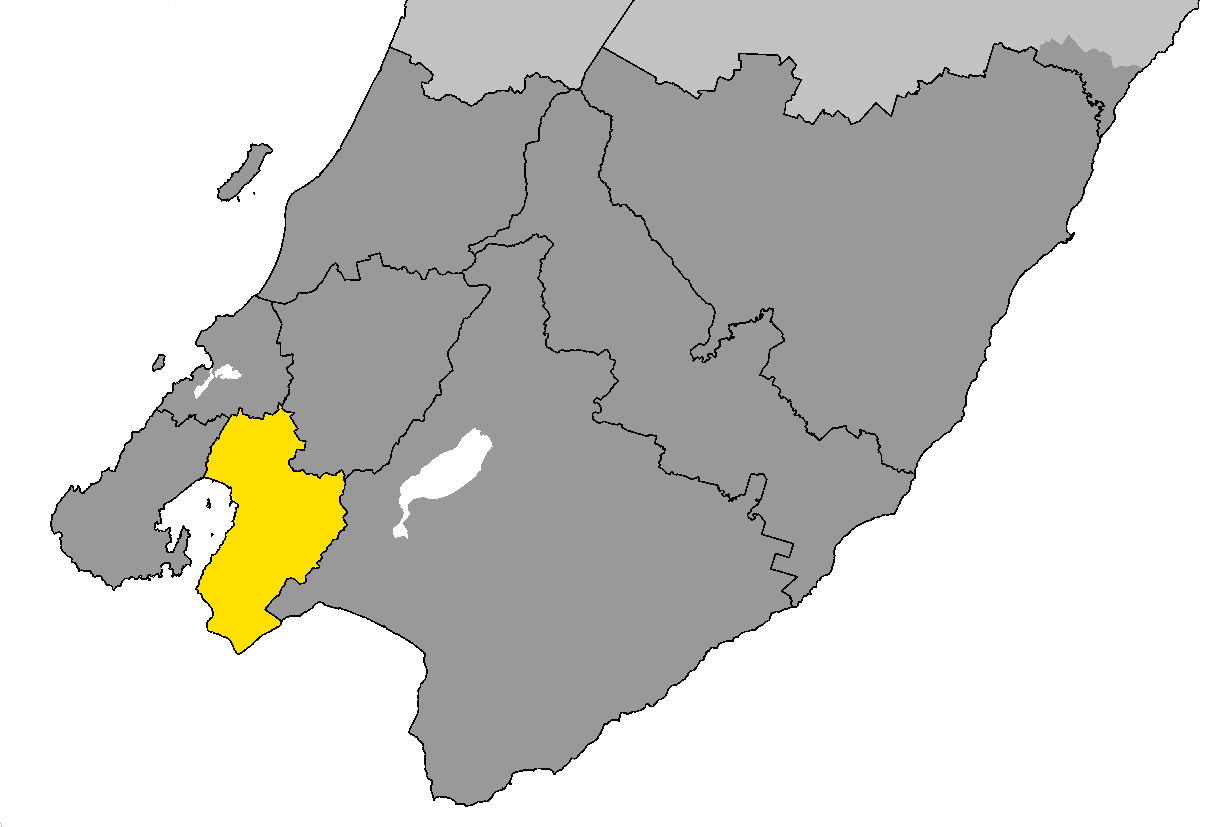
- Position of Lower Hutt within Wellington Region

The 1995 Hutt City Council election was part of the 1995 New Zealand local elections, to elect members to sub-national councils and boards. The Hutt City elections covered one regional council (the Wellington Regional Council), city council and various local boards and licensing trusts. The polling was conducted using the standard first-past-the-post electoral method.

== Hutt City Council ==
=== Mayor ===
1995 Lower Hutt mayoral election
Party	Candidate	Votes	%	±%
Independent	John Terris	9,901	33.61	
Positive Focus	Peter Glensor	5,945	20.18	
Independent	Ross Jamieson	5,913	20.07	
Independent	Lawrie Woodley	3,416	11.59	−34.25
Independent	Jim Allen	2,295	7.79	
Independent	Colin Seymour	933	3.16	
Independent	David Walkinshaw	279	0.94	
Informal votes		771	2.61	+0.45
Majority		3,956	13.43	
Turnout		29,453	44.50	+19.20

=== Central Ward ===
The Central Ward elected two members to the Hutt City Council

Central Ward
Party	Candidate	Votes	%	±%
Independent	Lawrie Woodley	1,888	31.65	
Positive Focus	Peter Glensor	1,751	29.35	
Citizens Action	John Goldingham	1,617	27.10	
Independent	Stephanie Meo	1,596	26.75	
Citizens Action	David Hendry	1,489	24.96	
Independent	Bruce Meech	982	16.46	
Independent	Geoff Mann	827	13.86	
Independent	Colin Seymour	823	13.79	
Positive Focus	Ema Weepu	615	10.31	
Independent	Andrew Bali	166	2.78	
Informal votes		177	2.96	
Turnout		5,965		

=== Eastern Ward ===
The Eastern Ward elected two members to the Hutt City Council

Eastern Ward
Party	Candidate	Votes	%	±%
Independent	Joan Monrad	1,881	41.38	+1.56
Positive Focus	Scott Dalziell	1,554	34.19	
Independent	Teri Puketapu	1,450	31.90	−6.07
Citizens Action	Paul Irik	1,232	27.10	
Independent	Nick Ursin	958	21.07	+11.69
Positive Focus	Steven Lulich	930	20.46	
Citizens Action	Tafa Poutoa	842	18.52	
Informal votes		244	5.36	+4.14
Turnout		4,545		

=== Harbour Ward ===
The Harbour Ward elected two members to the Hutt City Council

Harbour Ward
Party	Candidate	Votes	%	±%
Independent	Ross Jamieson	2,335	43.22	
Independent	Joy Baird	2,172	40.20	+1.19
Independent	Jim Allen	1,681	31.11	−4.50
Independent	Roy Cox	1,124	20.80	
Positive Focus	Pam Tan	986	18.25	
Citizens Action	Lynn Hawkins	891	16.49	
Positive Focus	Karl Masina	822	15.21	
Independent	Peti Satiu	538	9.95	
Informal votes		255	4.72	+2.10
Turnout		5,402		

=== Northern Ward ===
The Northern Ward elected two members to the Hutt City Council

Northern Ward
Party	Candidate	Votes	%	±%
Independent	Pat Brosnan	1,530	39.60	−3.75
Independent	Angus Finlayson	1,292	33.44	−7.16
Independent	Tata Parata	1,255	32.48	+1.16
Citizens Action	Kevin Kapea	986	25.52	
Positive Focus	Audrey Misipeka	893	23.11	
Citizens Action	Peter MacMillan	862	22.31	−1.10
Positive Focus	Bill Werry	829	21.46	
Informal votes		80	2.07	+0.41
Turnout		3,863		

=== Wainuiomata Ward ===
The Wainuiomata Ward elected three members to the Hutt City Council

Wainuiomata Ward
Party	Candidate	Votes	%	±%
Independent	Betty Van Gaalen	3,328	73.87	−4.74
Independent	Ray Wallace	3,113	69.10	+23.56
Independent	Cathie Eady	1,938	43.01	
Independent	Len Little	1,803	40.02	−23.09
Independent	Reg Moore	1,254	27.83	−0.47
Positive Focus	Ann Pibal	1,116	24.77	
Positive Focus	Nanai-Pati Mua'au	858	19.04	
Informal votes		104	2.30	+0.44
Turnout		4,505		

=== Western Ward ===
The Western Ward elected two members to the Hutt City Council

Western Ward
Party	Candidate	Votes	%	±%
Independent	Margaret Cousins	1,562	47.91	−7.90
Independent	Graeme Ross	1,058	32.45	−13.97
Independent	Jill Berridge	1,049	32.17	
Citizens Action	Rosemary McLennan-Pratt	912	27.97	
Citizens Action	Jacinth Webster	692	21.22	
Positive Focus	Ken Howell	573	17.57	
Positive Focus	Vera Ellen	549	16.84	
Informal votes		126	3.86	+2.60
Turnout		3,260		

== Wellington Regional Council ==
=== Lower Hutt Ward ===
The Lower Hutt Ward elected four members to the Wellington Regional Council

Lower Hutt Ward
Party	Candidate	Votes	%	±%
Citizens Action	Irvine Yardley	12,393	53.70	
Independent	Sandra Greig	11,025	47.77	+1.21
Positive Focus	Dick Werry	9,633	41.74	
Independent	David Ogden	9,394	40.70	+1.60
Positive Focus	Alister Abernethy	9,194	39.84	
Independent	Alison Lawson	9,000	38.99	+0.80
Positive Focus	Maureen Burgess	8,593	37.23	
Turnout		23,077		
