= 1953 Lower Hutt mayoral election =

- 31 October 1953
- Turnout: 14,251 (52.56%)
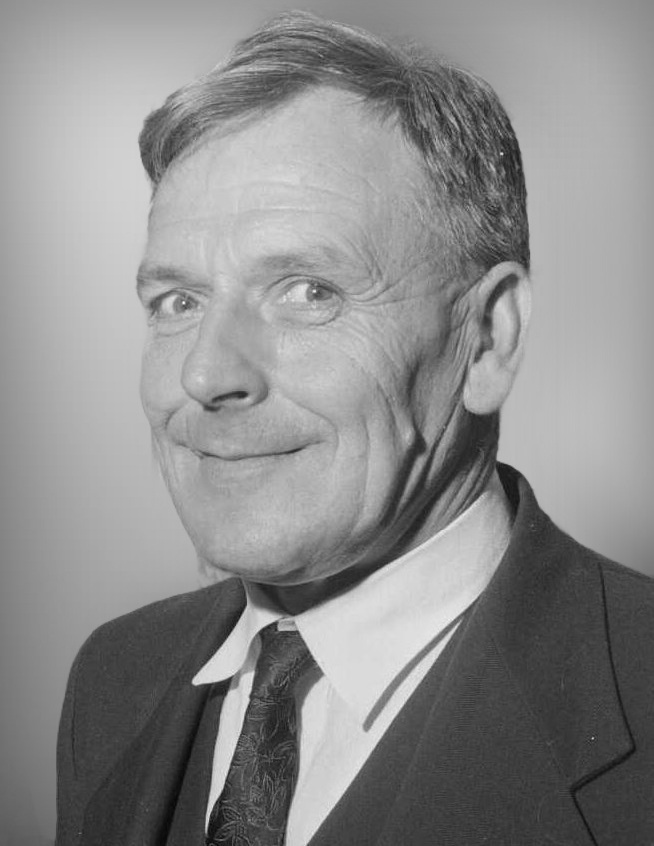

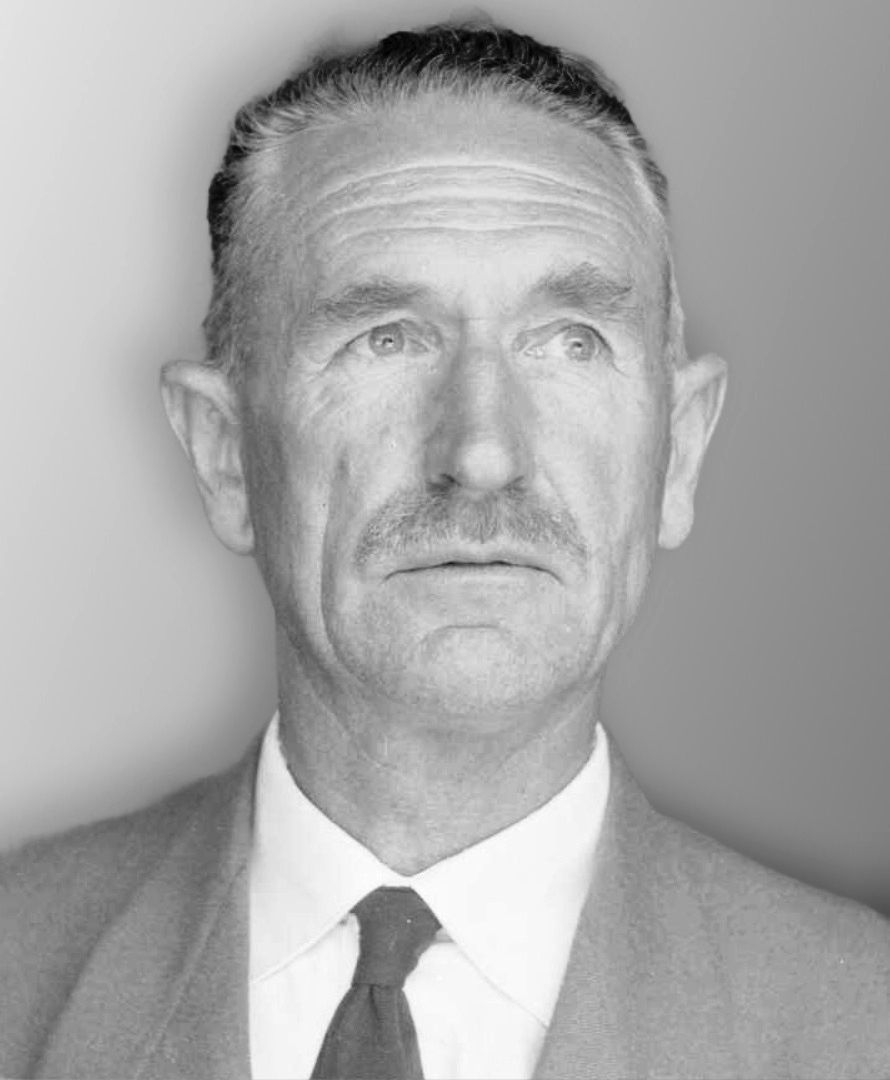
Candidate	Percy Dowse	Eric Rothwell
Party	Labour	Citizens'
Popular vote	8,670	5,488
Percentage	60.84	38.51
Mayor before election
Percy Dowse
Elected mayor
Percy Dowse

The 1953 Lower Hutt mayoral election was part of the New Zealand local elections held that same year. The elections were held for the role of Mayor of Lower Hutt plus other local government positions including fifteen city councillors, also elected triennially. The polling was conducted using the standard first-past-the-post electoral method.

== Background ==
A major talking point in the lead up to the election was the potential of a clash with the 1953 Royal Tour. There were proposals to postpone local elections until early 1954 over fears of reduced turnout due to a conflicted schedule. The proposals were considered by the Minister of Internal Affairs William Bodkin, who ultimately decided against it.

The incumbent Mayor, Percy Dowse, sought re-election for a second term. Dowse was opposed by Citizens' Association candidate and former deputy mayor Eric Rothwell who had been a councillor from 1944 to 1950. The election marked the first under an increased membership of fifteen councillors rather than twelve. The election resulted in another landslide victory for the Labour ticket, winning the mayoralty and every council seat.

== Mayoral results ==
1953 Lower Hutt mayoral election
Party	Candidate	Votes	%	±%
Labour	Percy Dowse	8,670	60.84	+4.83
Citizens'	Eric Rothwell	5,488	38.51	
Informal votes		93	0.65	−0.44
Majority		3,182	22.32	+9.22
Turnout		14,251	52.56	+8.50

== Councillor results ==
1953 Lower Hutt City Council election
Party	Candidate	Votes	%	±%
Labour	Harry Horlor	8,810	61.82	+3.77
Labour	Sam Chesney	8,321	58.38	+4.18
Labour	Bella Logie	8,254	57.91	+0.80
Labour	Trevor Young	8,234	57.77	+2.71
Labour	James McDonald	8,189	57.46	+3.22
Labour	Ronald George Maxwell	7,882	55.30	+1.10
Labour	John Davey	7,696	54.00	+3.68
Labour	Chen Werry	7,655	53.71	+4.69
Labour	Alexander Murray	7,644	53.63	+5.29
Labour	Jessie Donald	7,619	53.46	
Labour	Bert Sutherland	7,487	52.53	
Labour	Frank Whitley	7,478	52.47	+4.51
Labour	Wally Bugden	7,445	52.24	
Labour	Ernest Knights	7,397	51.90	+4.09
Labour	Clarence Fennell	7,111	49.89	
Citizens'	Stan Dudding	6,170	43.29	
Citizens'	Will Giltrap	6,142	43.09	+5.78
Citizens'	William Gregory	6,001	42.10	
Citizens'	Claude A. Browning	5,718	40.12	
Citizens'	Alfred Watson Tresseder	5,677	39.83	
Citizens'	Alwin Atkinson	5,410	37.96	
Citizens'	John Kennedy-Good	5,382	37.76	
Citizens'	Stanley Edwin Harding	5,339	37.46	
Citizens'	Trevor Joseph Duncan	5,184	36.37	
Citizens'	Colin Douglas Gilchrist	5,181	36.35	
Citizens'	George Noel Taylor	3,274	22.97	
Citizens'	Albert Maud	3,259	22.86	+10.10
Citizens'	Cyril Phelps	3,177	22.29	
Citizens'	James Philip Treahy	1,946	13.65	
Citizens'	Edwin Ernest Stoupe	1,885	13.22	
