= 1965 Lower Hutt mayoral election =

- 9 October 1965
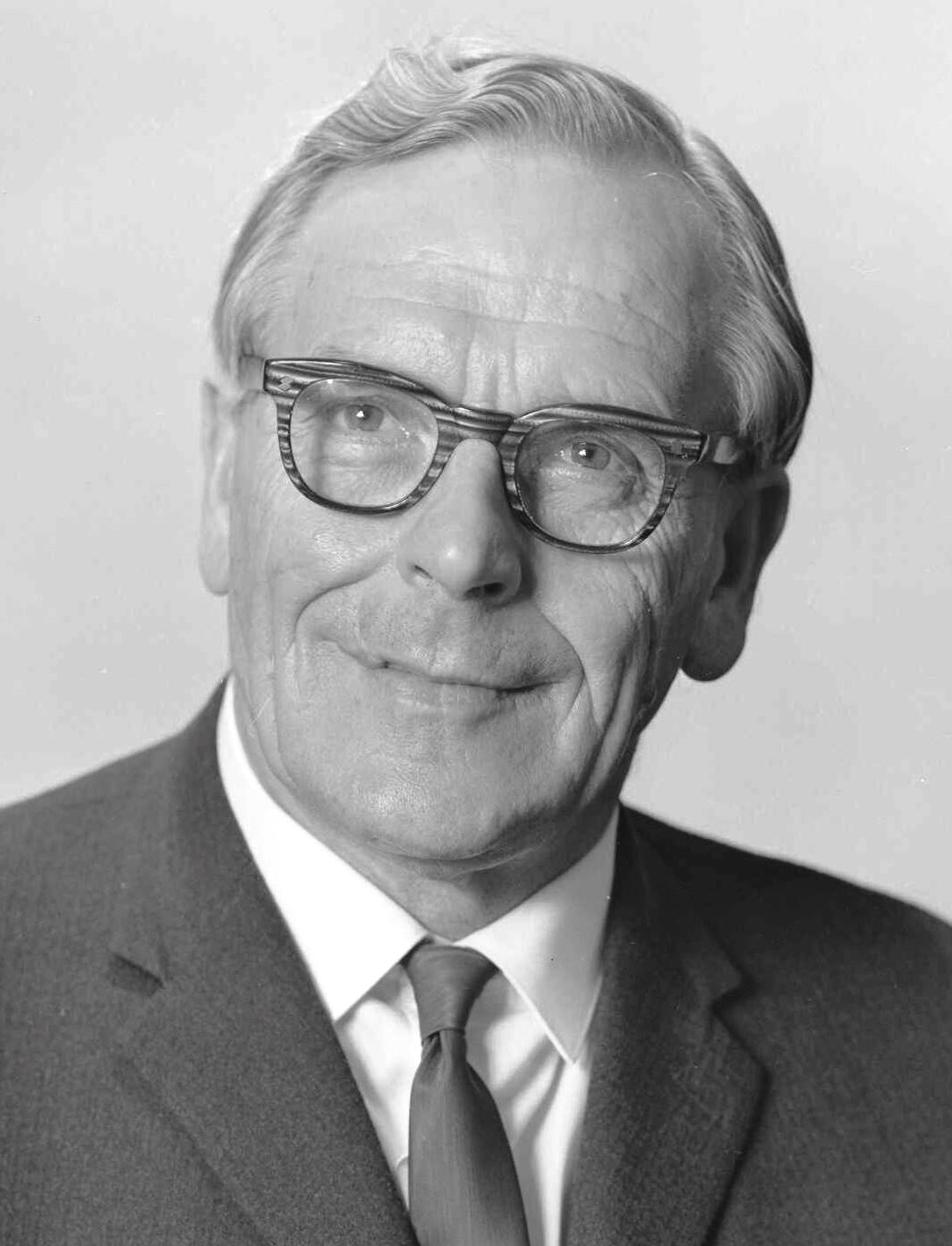
Candidate	Percy Dowse
Party	Labour
Popular vote	elected unopposed
Mayor before election
Percy Dowse
Elected mayor
Percy Dowse

The 1965 Lower Hutt mayoral election was part of the New Zealand local elections held that same year. The elections were held for the role of Mayor of Lower Hutt plus other local government positions including fifteen city councillors, also elected triennially. The polling was conducted using the standard first-past-the-post electoral method.

== Background ==
The incumbent Mayor, Percy Dowse, sought re-election for a sixth term. He was returned unopposed as no other candidates nominated. It was the first time in 74 years that a mayor had been elected without a poll in Lower Hutt. Councillor John Kennedy-Good was encouraged by centre-right supporters to stand for mayor, but he declined to challenge Dowse, who he considered a good leader as well as a personal friend. The Citizens' Association, while not contesting the mayoralty, stood a full ticket of council candidates, the first time they had done so since 1953. This was to avoid a repeat of the 1959-62 council where Citizens' endorsed Ratepayer Independents won a majority on the council, but were hampered by having little in the way of agreed policy.

== Councillor results ==
1965 Lower Hutt City Council election
Party	Candidate	Votes	%	±%
Labour	Chen Werry	6,020	61.35	+8.77
Labour	Trevor Young	5,787	58.97	+3.37
Labour	Wally Bugden	5,725	58.34	+9.86
Labour	Sam Chesney	5,706	58.15	+3.75
Citizens'	John Kennedy-Good	5,578	56.84	+9.63
Labour	Alexander Campbell	5,573	56.79	+8.25
Labour	Jessie Donald	5,499	56.04	+3.68
Labour	Kitty Mildenhall	5,308	54.09	
Citizens'	Ted Holdaway	5,223	53.23	+7.71
Labour	David Carrad	5,022	51.18	
Labour	William Harvey	4,953	50.47	+4.99
Citizens'	Dave Hadley	4,910	50.04	+6.86
Labour	Bert Sutherland	4,876	49.69	+4.44
Citizens'	Don Lee	4,808	49.00	+7.99
Labour	John Seddon	4,798	48.89	
Labour	Graeme Ronald Ross	4,776	48.67	
Labour	Joan Mary Pearce	4,713	48.03	
Labour	William Mouat McLaren	4,677	47.66	+4.09
Citizens'	Ted Gibbs	4,433	45.17	
Citizens'	Donald Kincaid	4,424	45.08	
Labour	William John Jarvis	4,345	44.28	
Citizens'	Arthur Ashley Cooper	4,321	44.03	
Citizens'	John Ross Wilkinson	4,278	43.59	
Citizens'	Stewart Forsyth Claxton	4,268	43.49	
Citizens'	James Kawarau Horn	4,228	43.09	+3.04
Citizens'	Hugh McKinnon Smith	4,210	42.90	+2.78
Citizens'	George Ernest Collin	4,122	42.00	
Citizens'	Joan Gough	4,026	41.03	
Citizens'	Claude Swift	3,994	40.70	
Citizens'	Hazel Hohepina Snow	3,763	38.35	
Independent	Cyril Phelps	2,873	29.28	−12.24
