= 1950 Lower Hutt mayoral election =

- 18 November 1950
- Turnout: 12,627 (44.00%)
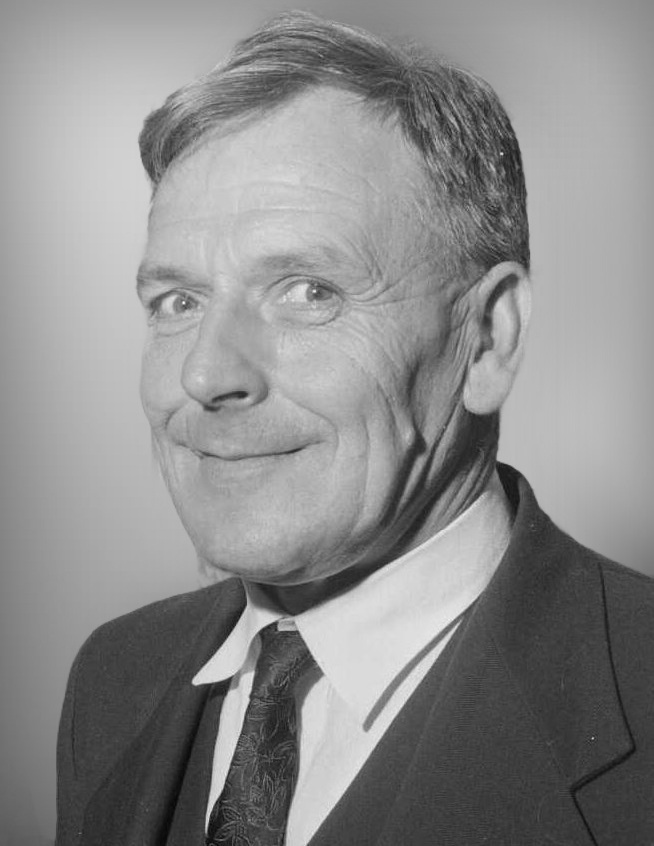

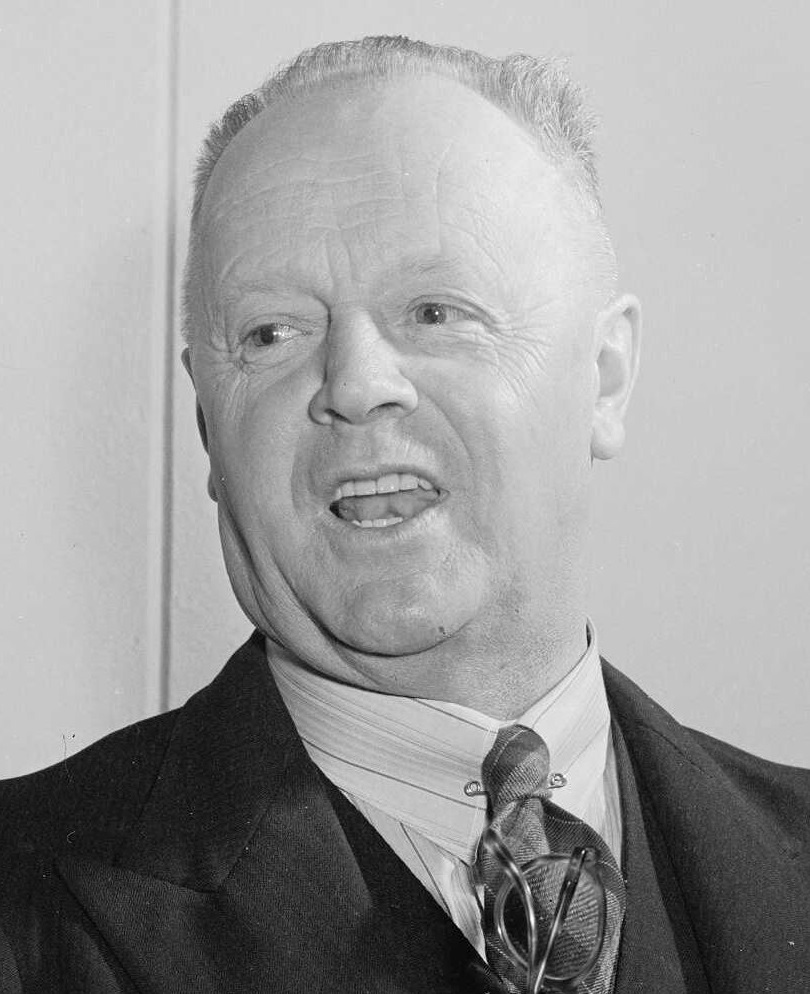
Candidate	Percy Dowse	William Gregory
Party	Labour	Citizens'
Popular vote	7,072	5,417
Percentage	56.01	42.90
Mayor before election
William Gregory
Elected mayor
Percy Dowse

The 1950 Lower Hutt mayoral election was part of the New Zealand local elections held that same year. The elections were held for the role of Mayor of Lower Hutt plus other local government positions including twelve city councillors, also elected triennially. The polling was conducted using the standard first-past-the-post electoral method.

== Background ==
The incumbent Mayor, William Gregory, sought re-election for a full term after winning a by-election the previous year. Gregory was opposed by Labour Party candidate Percy Dowse who had been a councillor since 1947 (and previously from 1935 to 1938). Dowse, who had run for mayor unsuccessfully twice before in 1938 and 1944, defeated Gregory. Labour won in a landslide securing not only the mayoralty but all 12 seats on the city council as well. However, one of the successful candidates was Dowse resulting in the twelfth council seat being allocated to Citizens' candidate Norman Player.

== Mayoral results ==
1950 Lower Hutt mayoral election
Party	Candidate	Votes	%	±%
Labour	Percy Dowse	7,072	56.01	
Citizens'	William Gregory	5,417	42.90	−7.39
Informal votes		138	1.09	+0.64
Majority		1,655	13.10	
Turnout		12,627	44.00	+5.65

== Councillor results ==
1950 Lower Hutt City Council election
Party	Candidate	Votes	%	±%
Labour	Percy Dowse (Note: As Dowse won the Mayoralty his election to the council was voided and his seat was awarded to the highest polling unsuccessful candidate.)	7,476	59.20	+6.29
Labour	Harry Horlor	7,331	58.05	+0.69
Labour	Bella Logie	7,212	57.11	+3.52
Labour	Trevor Young	6,953	55.06	+5.31
Labour	James McDonald	6,847	54.22	+3.34
Labour	Sam Chesney	6,845	54.20	
Labour	Ronald George Maxwell	6,485	54.20	+9.05
Labour	John Davey	6,354	50.32	
Labour	Chen Werry	6,191	49.02	
Labour	Alexander Murray	6,105	48.34	
Labour	Frank Whitley	6,057	47.96	
Labour	Ernest Knights	6,037	47.81	
Citizens'	Norman Player	4,879	38.63	
Citizens'	Will Giltrap (Note: Giltrap was declared elected to the council unopposed in November 1951 to replace Norman Player who resigned.)	4,712	37.31	−15.68
Citizens'	Eric Rothwell	4,631	36.67	−14.68
Citizens'	Briton Matthews	4,626	36.63	−13.67
Citizens'	Marjorie Alice Feist	4,572	36.20	
Citizens'	Frank Lonsdale	4,540	35.95	−15.26
Citizens'	Clarence Edgar Bentley	4,489	35.55	
Citizens'	George Austad	4,450	35.24	−13.85
Citizens'	Dick Simpson	4,210	33.34	−14.86
Citizens'	Albert Maud	4,163	32.96	
Citizens'	Eustace Jackson Rishworth	4,119	32.62	
Citizens'	Harry Godfrey Calvert	4,002	31.69	
Communist	Donald Austin	1,008	7.98	
Communist	William Durning	649	5.13	

Table footnotes:
