= Laurie Sutton =

New Zealand rugby player

Laurie Oliver Wallace Sutton QSM (13 March 1922 – 18 May 2003) was a New Zealand rugby player and community activist.

== Biography ==
Sutton was born in 1922 in Wellington. A keen sportsman and believer in fitness, he was a representative rugby union and rugby league player for Wellington. He was physical training instructor for the local Boys Brigade and later an executive member of the Taita Rugby Club.

In 1940 he joined the army and served in the New Zealand Scottish Regiment. He fought in the Solomon Islands campaigns as part of the 38th Field Regiment. After the war he was an active member of the Returned Servicemen's Association (RSA) and was a welfare officer for the Taita and Lower Hutt RSA clubs and was president of both (Taita from 1973 to 1981 and Lower Hutt from 1983 to 1992). Sutton was noted for his negotiating skills which helped him be an effective advocate. He was the driving force behind the construction of a memorial wall in Taita Cemetery to house the ashes of returned servicemen and women. He also led negotiations for the Lower Hutt RSA to purchase the land on Cornwall Street to build its new facilities. He was a national councillor of the RSA and was awarded life membership of the RSA and its gold star award in 1988 for his services.

In 1946 he married Betty Burrows with whom he had three daughters and two sons. His family lived in Taita which boomed in population post-war with new housing developments. Both Sutton and his wife were active in building the rapidly growing area into a community. He was a long-serving member of the Taita North (later Pomare) School committee. He was the board chairman for thirteen years and raised funds to build a swimming pool and assembly hall for the school. He was a freemason and a member of the Mokoia Masonic Lodge from 1945 and was the master mason in 1957.

Sutton joined the Labour Party. He was chairman of the Western Hutt electorate committee and was a friend of its MP, and Minister of Internal Affairs, Henry May. At the 1971 and 1974 local elections he stood as a candidate for the Lower Hutt City Council on the Labour Party ticket. While polling well he was not elected on either occasion. In later years he became disaffected with the direction the Labour Party's policy was taking.

In the late-1980s he was a leader on the community campaign to save Silverstream Hospital where his wife Betty had previously worked. The campaign was unsuccessful and the hospital was closed in June 1989. He then led the public Save Hutt Hospital campaign protest over the threatened closure of Hutt Hospital's ward 8 (the adolescent ward) which climaxed with a large march outside the hospital on High Street. It was thought to be the biggest crowd ever gathered for any occasion in the Hutt Valley. When he addressed the massive crowd he described Simon Upton, the then minister of health, as "wonky in the head" if he failed to heed the extent of the opposition to the government's plan to centralise Wellington's specialist medical and surgical services.

In the 1991 New Year Honours, Sutton was awarded the Queen's Service Medal for community service.

Sutton died in 2003, aged 81. His ashes were placed in the Taita Cemetery memorial wall which he had founded.
