= Ernie Barry =

New Zealand educator and politician

Ernie Barry MBE JP

15th Deputy Mayor of Lower Hutt
- In office 25 October 1977 – 28 October 1980
- Mayor: John Kennedy-Good
- Preceded by: Chen Werry
- Succeeded by: Mollie Ngan-Kee

Personal details
- Born: Ernest Albert Barry; 1928 London, England
- Died: December 2003 (aged 74–75) Brisbane, Australia
- Spouse: Eileen Barbara Barry (m. 1953)
- Children: 5
- Profession: Plumber, teacher

Ernest Albert Barry (1928 − December 2003) was a New Zealand educator and politician. He was a Lower Hutt city councillor and was deputy mayor from 1977 to 1980.

== Biography ==
=== Early life and career ===
Barry was born in London, England. Both his father and brother were Labour Party members and local government politicians, influencing his own political philosophy. After his education he trained as a plumber. He then emigrated to New Zealand as a "Ten Pound Pom" in 1950 aboard the Atlantis.

After arriving in New Zealand he worked as a plumber. He and his wife, Barbara, had five children. They had met in 1952 and married in 1953. The family lived in Wainuiomata and Barry started his own plumbing and sheet metal business. Subsequently, he became a technical tutor at the Petone Technical Institute in 1962. In 1968 purchased a plot of land in the hills behind Epuni. He was involved in the local school committee, the Lower Hutt Boy Scouts and Petone Rugby Club. For leisure he was a barbershop singer and woodturner.

=== Political career ===
He became involved in a community campaign to improve the water quality of the Hutt River. The mayor, Percy Dowse, persuaded him to put himself forward for local political office. At the 1971 local election he was elected to the Lower Hutt City Council on the Labour Party ticket. Once a council member he voiced the concerns of scientists around the council table that the effects of gravel extraction at the edge of the river bed was affecting the quality of the water, leading to discolouration and trout population reduction. When extracting, companies were using the river to wash the gravel which discharged fine materials back into the river and caused the restriction of surface water reaching the aquifer. The scientists' concern was that the blocking of the aquifer would destroy the fresh water store near the river mouth by salt water from Wellington Harbour. A court case ensued which was won by the council and led to the end of the extraction practice by gravel companies. As a result of the case water quality subsequently improved markedly. He stated this was his proudest achievement in local government. On the city council he was a member of the works, town planning and bylaws, traffic and health committees. He was particularly proud of his work in town planning to establish the Rata Street Loop walking track at the edge of Naenae. At the 1975 Labour Party conference Barry, a delegate of the Epuni-Waihete branch, spoke during a particularly contentious debate on abortion. He said the issue had been "thrashed again and again" and the public was now sick and tired of it.

From 1971 to 1974 he was an elected member of the Hutt Valley Electric Power Board. He was also a member of the Wellington Regional Water Board and Hutt Valley Drainage Boards. In 1977 he stood for the mayoralty, after Labour's previous mayoral candidate John Seddon declined to stand, but was defeated by incumbent John Kennedy-Good. He was, however, re-elected to the council where Labour won a majority. For that triennium he was deputy mayor after Labour won control of the council and also took all but one committee chairmanship. At the 1980 election he left local politics after he again lost the mayoralty to Kennedy-Good. The election was a landslide defeat for Labour and Barry, alongside all but one Labour candidate was defeated for the councillor seats. Fellow councillor John Terris, the only successful Labour candidate in 1980, said Barry was a "kindly soul" but not afraid of confrontation.

=== Later life and death ===
Barry was appointed a Member of the Order of the British Empire in the 1986 Queen's Birthday Honours, for services to local government.

Barry retired from teaching in 1989 and moved with his wife to live in Brisbane. He was diagnosed with acute myeloid leukemia in September 2003. While in hospital under care he gave the hospital advice on how a nearby toilet cistern was leaking and occupied time calculating how much water was being lost. He died in December 2003. He was survived by his wife and children. His wife Barbara died in Brisbane in 2015.

== Citations ==
Political offices
Preceded by Chen Werry	Deputy Mayor of Lower Hutt; 1977–1980	Succeeded by Mollie Ngan-Kee
