= Mason Affair =

1966 political scandal in New Zealand

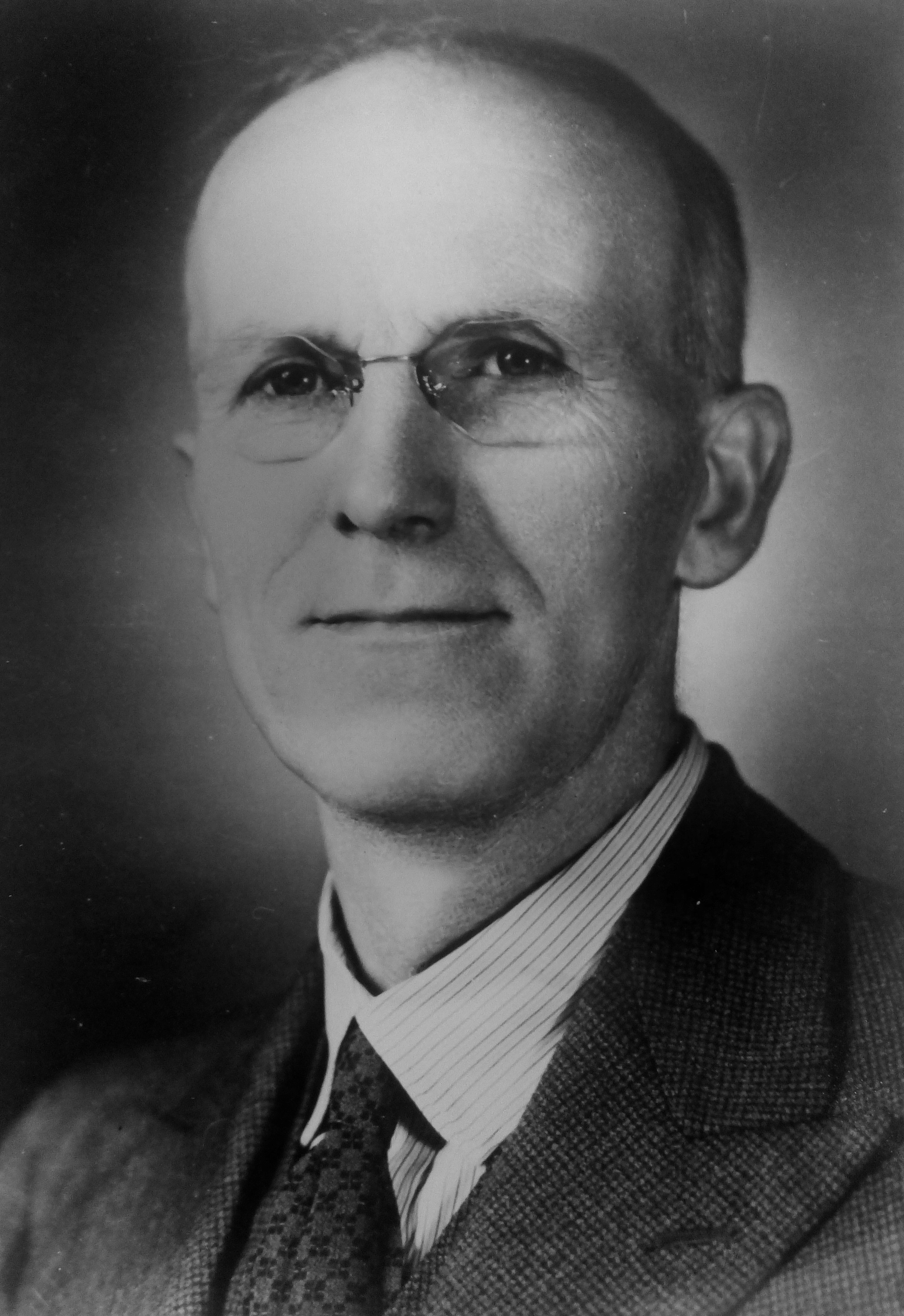
Rex Mason

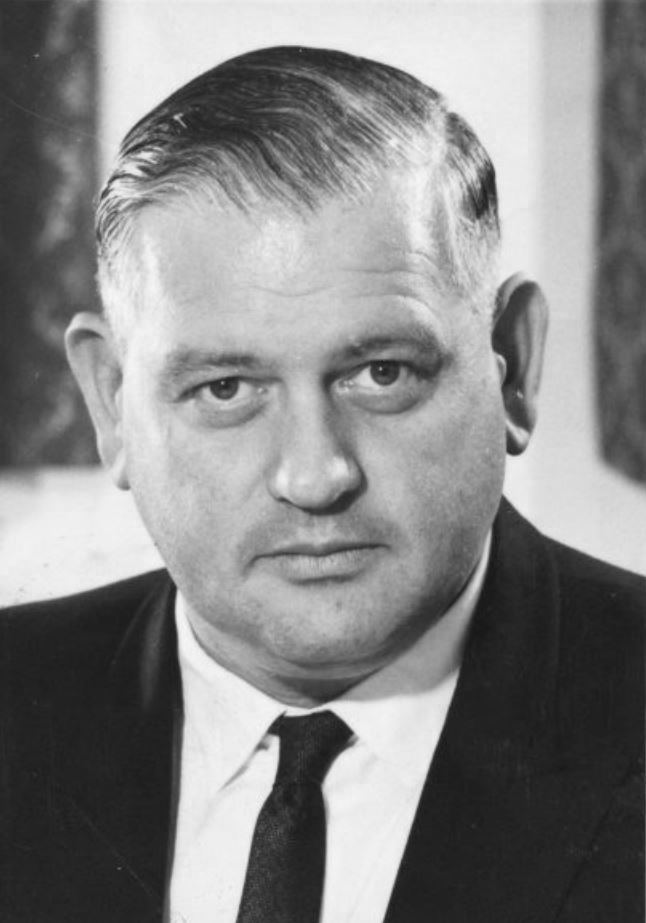
Norman Kirk

The Mason Affair was an event that transpired in New Zealand in the lead up to the 1966 election revolving around Labour Party MP Rex Mason and other septuagenarian MPs being pressured to retire.

== Background ==
Between the 1963 and 1966 elections the Labour Party, first under leader Arnold Nordmeyer and particularly under his successor Norman Kirk, were increasingly conscious of the ageing members in the parliamentary caucus. Many of the stalwarts of the first and second Labour governments were now in their 80s and still in Parliament. Most had little energy left and, despite still occupying senior places in the party, had become ineffective at countering the government. As such, newer MPs were being over-relied upon to do so, and particularly from 1965 under Labour's new and much younger leader, Kirk, an effort was made to rejuvenate by encouraging older members to retire. The recently retired party president Martyn Finlay agreed with Kirk and had attempted to persuade six MPs (Walter Nash, Mabel Howard, Eruera Tirikatene, Robert Macfarlane, Ethel McMillan and Rex Mason) to retire voluntarily. All of whom (except McMillan) were over 70. The party newspaper The Statesman published editorials calling for retirements stating that the frontbenches should be occupied by the 'leaders of today and tomorrow, not yesterday' and should not be 'the final resting places for senior members either on the basis of self-interest or length of service'.

At the 1966 party conference a party policy was proposed whereby MPs were required to retire at the next election after turning 70 years old. Enthusiasm for the policy was far from unanimous and some elements of the party organisation protested. A similar remit had actually been proposed earlier in 1964 but neither Nordmeyer nor Kirk bothered to advocate for it and it was rejected by the conference delegates.

== The 1966 election ==
Despite there being several MPs in the over-70 bracket, Kirk put a particular effort on forcing Mason's retirement. Mason, who had been in parliament since 1926, now lived in Wellington and seldom visited his Auckland electorate of New Lynn. He relied on local-body politicians, such as the ex-Mayor of New Lynn, Stan Rickards, to do much of his constituency work for him yet, despite this, the local party executive were solidly loyal to Mason. They believed he was still a reliable advocate for the area in parliament and intended to renominate him for the 1966 election. Eventually, following pressure from Labour's head office, the executive reopened nominations for the New Lynn seat stating (disingenuously) that Mason was retiring. Mason remained silent publicly on the proceedings though discussed the matter intensely with his local party members and with Allan McDonald, the party general-secretary. Eventually, he felt he was left with little choice but to retire at the coming election. Mason still had support among many in the local party and there was a degree of resentment to the party head office intervening. Fred Gerbic, the chairman of the New Lynn electorate committee, resigned his position in protest of Mason's forced retirement, as did several other party officeholders in the electorate.

Mason's situation caused much negative media coverage for Labour and Kirk's leadership. Kirk's biographer David Grant stating that the affair "... was great material for antagonistic newspaper editors and the National politicians, who had a field day criticising Labour's apparently undemocratic decision-making processes and dysfunctionality." Given this bad publicity in the run up to an election, and the party executive admitting they had handled the situation badly, little effort was put in to pressuring any other MPs to retire. Macfarlane had been re-nominated again by local members and, despite his nomination being queried by head office, he was allowed to stand again on the stipulation that he would not stand at the 1969 election. Nash, Howard, Tirikatene, McMillan and 69-year old Ritchie Macdonald were all allowed to stand for re-election.

Mason's exit from parliament was exacerbated further after Kirk farewelled Mason in just three scant sentences, failing to mention his huge contribution to law reform, in what many saw as a less-than-gracious speech. This contrasted starkly from the more courteous and considerate tributes that Mason received from the other side of the house, particularly from Prime Minister Keith Holyoake and National MP Ernest Aderman.

== Outcomes ==
At the 1967 party conference, delegates formally amended the party constitution requiring MPs to retire at the next election after turning 70 and for candidates over 60 (aside from incumbents) to be ineligible for selection. Kirk stated to the conference that candidate selections should not be made on a 'sentimental' basis as he knew of instances "when the selection committee is aware that the candidate was no longer suitable for the job yet gives its support for purely selfish reasons." As a result, there were many retirements (some reluctant) at the 1969 election giving Kirk the younger and more energetic caucus he desired. Mason, nevertheless, remained well respected in the party for his service and Kirk invited him as a guest of honour to the first meeting of caucus following Labour's victory in the 1972 election where he oversaw the election of the cabinet.
