= Alister Abernethy =

New Zealand trade unionist, politician and public servant

Alister Abernethy QSM JP
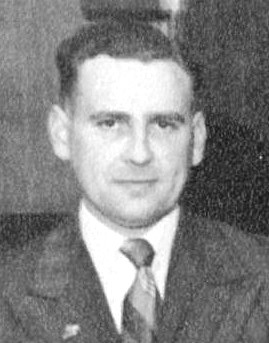
- Abernethy in the 1950s

Member of the Lower Hutt City Council
- In office 8 October 1983 – 14 October 1989
- In office 8 October 1977 – 11 October 1980

Member of the Dunedin City Council
- In office 18 November 1950 – May 1961

Personal details
- Born: 24 September 1920 Balclutha, New Zealand
- Died: 5 June 2003 (aged 82) Wellington, New Zealand
- Party: Labour
- Military career
- Allegiance: New Zealand
- Branch: Air Force
- Unit: Otago Rifles Regiment
- Conflicts: World War II

Alister Scott Abernethy QSM JP (24 September 1920 – 5 June 2003) was a New Zealand trade unionist, politician and public servant. Over a 39-year period he was an elected member in three different parts of New Zealand.

== Biography ==
Abernethy was born in Balclutha in 1920. He was the eldest of six children and grew up in Waitahuna near the town of Lawrence in Central Otago. Aged 15 he began working on a dairy farm, milking cows. During World War II, Abernethy served in the Otago Rifles Regiment and later served as a ground crew member with the Royal New Zealand Air Force.

After the war he found work as a paper-ruler and bookbinder at Whitcombe and Tombs in Dunedin. In April 1946 he married Nyra Edith Norman with whom he had three daughters and one son. He joined the Printers' Union and became the union's Otago area representative on its national council for nearly a decade. In later life he was awarded life membership of the Printed and Related Trade Union. Through the union he joined the Labour Party and became involved in local politics, becoming a leader in opposition to planned tram fare increases.

Aged 30 he was elected to the Dunedin City Council at the 1950 local elections on a Labour ticket. He served on the council until 1961 when he resigned after moving out of the city. For 8 years (1953–61) he was chairman of the council's works committee. Abernethy was also the chairman the Dunedin Metropolitan Milk Board and was a member of the Dunedin Metropolitan Regional Planning Authority.

He moved to Timaru in 1961 to take up the role of public relations officer for the South Canterbury area. He became involved in local politics there as well and was an elected member of the South Canterbury Electric Power Board. In 1966 he became a Justice of the Peace and later a marriage celebrant. In 1974 he was appointed as liaison officer to the Minister of Housing. The role was as a personal assistant to the minister, Bill Fraser, to assist with his workload. Fraser had previously been a Dunedin City Councillor alongside Abernethy from 1953 to 1956.

In 1974 he moved to Lower Hutt and served 9 years on the Lower Hutt City Council. He was first elected in 1977 but after one term was defeated (alongside all but one Labour candidate) in 1980. He was elected for two further terms between 1983 and 1989. In addition he served six years on the Wellington Regional Council and was twice Labour's mayoral candidate in Lower Hutt. At the 1983 local election he was defeated for the mayoralty by long time mayor John Kennedy-Good and in 1986 he lost to former councillor Glen Evans. He was also a member of the Hutt Valley Energy Board. In the 1988 New Year Honours, Abernethy was awarded the Queen's Service Medal for public services.

Even after retiring from the council he remained involved in local matters. In 1997 when Lower Hutt designated a new riverbank park, near the Ewen Bridge, the council wanted to name it after the recently deceased Diana, Princess of Wales. However Abernethy lobbied to name the park after a deceased former city council member Govind Bhaga Bhula (1933–1989). After a period of public debate the park was officially named Govind Bhula Park by the council in 1998.

He was the president of the Lower Hutt Returned Servicemen's Association (RSA) for many years until 1998 when he resigned. In retirement Abernethy was prolific in his writing of many lengthy and entertaining letters to the editor of the Hutt News, a local newspaper.

Abernethy died in Wellington on 5 June 2003, aged 82. He was survived by his four children, six grandchildren and two great-grandchildren.

== Personal life ==
He was interested in home brewing and collecting books and lamps. He was also a classic car enthusiast, in particular ones made by the Rootes Group. During the 1970s and 1980s he was a member of the Sunbeam Car Owners Club. His wife died in June 1987.
