= John Kennedy-Good =

New Zealand mayor

Sir John Kennedy-Good KBE QSO JP
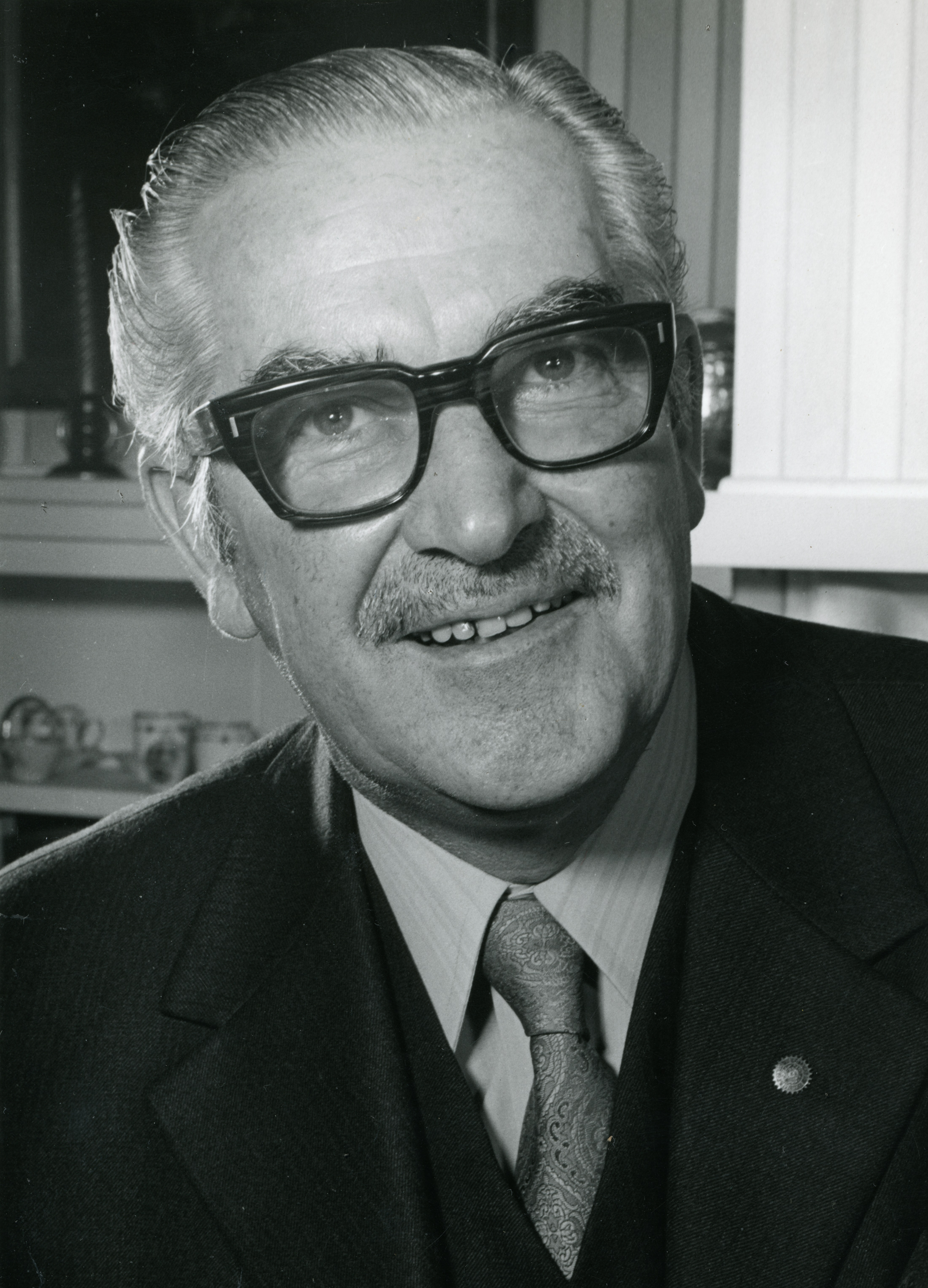

15th Mayor of Lower Hutt
- In office 21 December 1970 – 24 October 1986
- Deputy: See list: Dave Hadley (1970-71); John Seddon (1971–74); Chen Werry (1974–77); Ernie Barry (1977–80); Mollie Ngan Kee (1980-83); Teri Puketapu (1983-86)
- Preceded by: Percy Dowse
- Succeeded by: Glen Evans

Personal details
- Born: 8 August 1915 Goulburn, New South Wales, Australia
- Died: 11 July 2005 (aged 89) Auckland, New Zealand
- Party: National (until 1970)
- Spouse: June Clement Mackay (m. 1940)
- Children: 7
- Occupation: Dentist

Sir John Kennedy-Good KBE QSO JP (8 August 1915 – 11 July 2005) was a New Zealand politician. He was mayor of Lower Hutt from 1970 to 1986.

== Biography ==
=== Early life and career ===
Kennedy-Good was born in 1915 in Goulburn, New South Wales, where his father was working as a stock and station agent. The family later moved to Invercargill, New Zealand, where they ran a butcher's shop. Kennedy-Good was educated at Southland Boys' High School and graduated from the University of Otago with a Bachelor of Dental Surgery in 1940.

In 1940, he opened a dental practice in Lower Hutt and married June Clement Mackay, with whom he would have seven children. He served as president of the Wellington branch of the New Zealand Dental Association in 1950 and chair of the Dental Health Council in 1952.

=== Political career ===
Kennedy-Good became involved in local politics through the issue of fluoridation of Lower Hutt's water supply, which he supported. At the 1953 local-body elections he first stood for office for a seat on the Lower Hutt City Council. Standing on the Citizens' Association ticket, he was unsuccessful (as were all Citizens' candidates). He stood for the council again in 1962, as an independent, and was successful. Kennedy-Good was encouraged by centre-right voters to stand for mayor in 1965, but he declined to challenge the Labour mayor Percy Dowse, who he considered to be a good leader as well as a personal friend. He stood only for the council (now on the Citizens' ticket again) and was easily re-elected.

Kennedy-Good twice stood unsuccessfully as the National Party candidate for the New Zealand parliament in the Hutt electorate: in the 1966 general election against Walter Nash; and against Trevor Young in the 1968 by-election following Nash's death. Initially he also intended to stand in the 1969 general election, and cited this reason for not contesting the mayoralty at the 1968 local elections. Ultimately he did not stand at the 1969 general election. Kennedy-Good was also a member of the Wellington Harbour Board. He was first elected in 1968 and served four terms until 1980 when he did not seek re-election.

Dowse died mid-term on 9 December 1970. Rather than hold a by-election the city council members decided to elect a councillor to finish the remainder of the term until the scheduled election 10 months later. The councillors elected Kennedy-Good as Dowse's successor. He resigned his National Party membership upon becoming mayor, believing the position should be non-partisan. The Citizens' Association, who had a majority on the council, surprisingly did not select Kennedy-Good for the 1971 election instead choosing the deputy mayor (and 1968 candidate) Dave Hadley instead. As a result, Kennedy-Good formed his own "combined" electoral ticket, consisting of candidates who were previously Citizens' and Labour affiliated, with which to contest the election. In an evenly divided poll Kennedy-Good narrowly edged out former Labour councillor John Seddon to win the election (Hadley came third). Re-elected again in 1974, there was major flooding in the Hutt Valley in December 1976. The council did not have the resources to fix the damages and had to ask the government for assistance. Prime Minister Robert Muldoon visited the flood affected areas, however antagonisms between Muldoon and some Labour Party councillors led to the funds being delayed. Once they came through the council was able to help the neighbourhoods affected. His majority fell at the 1977 election and Labour won a majority of seats after criticisms of the council's disaster response. In 1980 (having retired from the Harbour Board) he was elected to the new Wellington Regional Council. After two further terms he retired as mayor in 1986. The latter years of his mayoralty were dominated by the construction of Queensgate Shopping Centre and one of his final acts as mayor was its official opening.

=== Later life and death ===
In retirement, Kennedy-Good lived at Pauanui and later Whangaparaoa. He died in Auckland in 2005 and was buried at Christ Church Cemetery in Taitā.

== Honours and recognition ==
Kennedy-Good was appointed a Companion of the Queen's Service Order for public services in the 1977 Queen's Silver Jubilee and Birthday Honours, and a Knight Commander of the Order of the British Empire, for service to local government and the community, in the 1983 New Year Honours. The Kennedy-Good Bridge in Lower Hutt is named in his honour.

== Notes ==
Political offices
Preceded by Percy Dowse	Mayor of Lower Hutt; 1970–1986	Succeeded by Glen Evans
