= John Seddon (politician) =

New Zealand politician and chief executive (1934–2021)

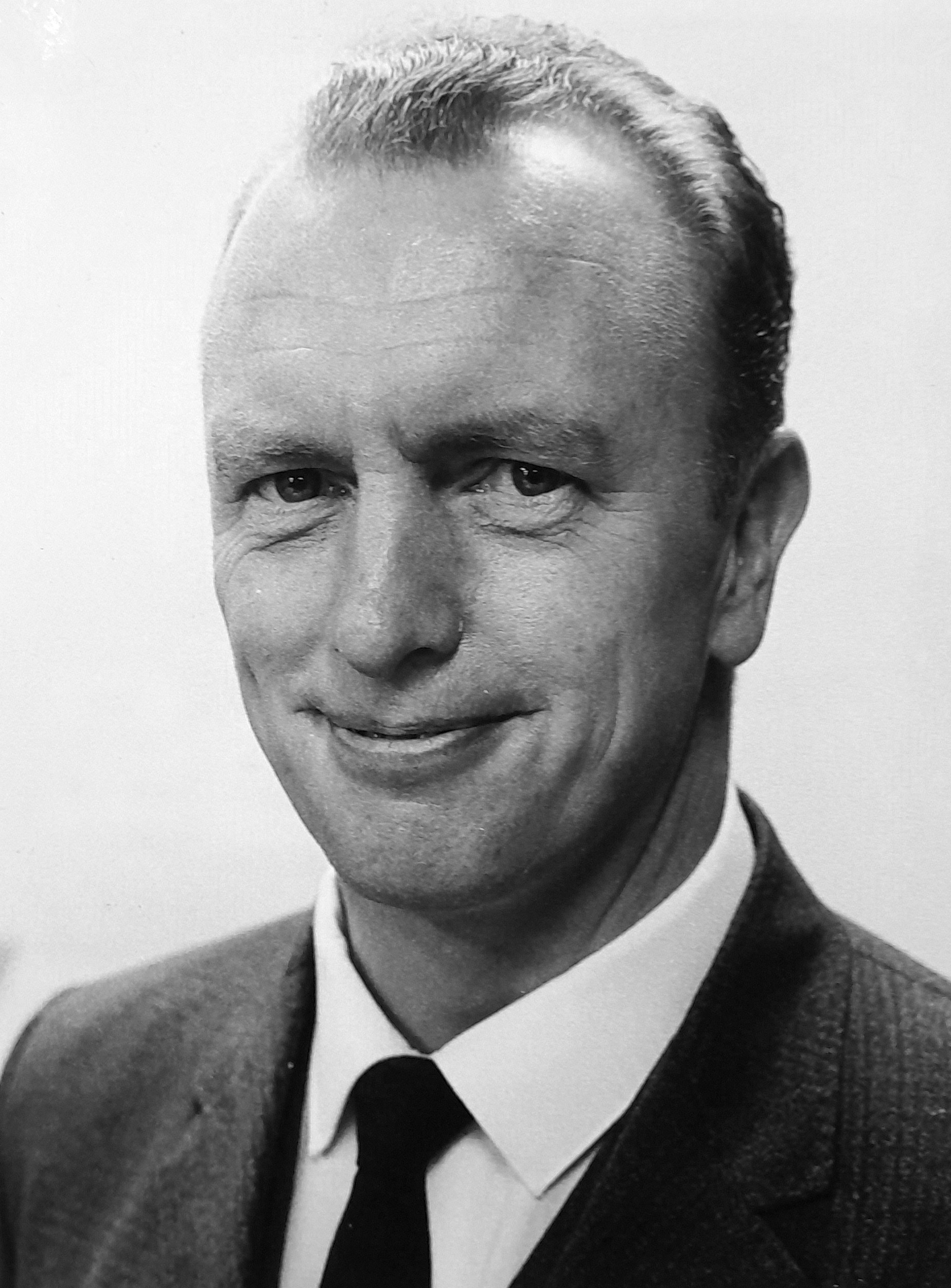

14th Deputy Mayor of Lower Hutt
- In office 26 October 1971 – 29 October 1974
- Mayor: John Kennedy-Good
- Preceded by: Dave Hadley
- Succeeded by: Chen Werry

Personal details
- Born: 29 December 1934 Chislehurst, England
- Died: 30 November 2021 (aged 86) New Zealand
- Children: 8
- Profession: Engineer

John Bryan Seddon JP (29 December 1934 – 30 November 2021) was a New Zealand politician and chief executive. He was the deputy mayor of Lower Hutt and later chief executive of Porirua City Council for twenty years from 1980 until 2000.

== Biography ==
=== Early life ===
Seddon was born in 1934 in Chislehurst, England. His grandfather came from St Helens and was a relative of former New Zealand Prime Minister Richard Seddon. He qualified in gas engineering and moved to New Zealand in 1957 as an assisted immigrant. Once in New Zealand he found his surname and distant kinship with a former Prime Minister advantageous. He was an engineer and was employed by Fletcher Construction and later Mobil Oil, eventually becoming a senior manager. Seddon's first marriage had broken up while he was running his own small business after a succession of senior management jobs in local companies.

=== Political career ===
He stood for election to the New Zealand House of Representatives as the Labour Party candidate for the seat of Egmont at the 1963 election, finishing second and significantly increasing Labour's share of the vote. Apart from the one-term of the Third Labour Government, Labour was in opposition the whole time he was trying for a seat in the 60s and 70s, "I could see no fun sitting in opposition year after year" he later recounted.

He served four terms on the Lower Hutt City Council. He was first elected in 1965 but, owing to business commitments, did not stand for re-election in 1968. He returned to local politics in 1971 when he was selected as Labour's mayoral candidate after the sitting Labour mayor, Percy Dowse, died mid-term. At the 1971 local-body election he came within a few hundred votes of unseating the sitting mayor, John Kennedy-Good, who had been appointed mayor in 1970 after Dowse's death. While not being able to unseat the mayor he won a seat on the council again and served three terms from 1971 to 1980. Seddon served as both deputy mayor and chairman of the finance committee during his second spell on the council. He was the focus of much media attention when he unsuccessfully tried to block Apartheid era South Africa's participation in the 1976 Men's Softball World Cup, which were held at the council owned Hutt Recreation Ground in central Lower Hutt. That same year he relinquished the Labour leadership on the council to Ernie Barry. Labour councillor at the time, and future MP and mayor, John Terris stated Seddon was his first political mentor and that he "... believed absolutely in the take-no-prisoners style of political warfare."

He was a member of the Wellington Harbour Board for nine years from 1971 to 1980. He was a fierce critic of nuclear-powered and armed ships entering New Zealand waters while he was a Harbour Board member. Ahead of the 1978 election he put himself forward for the Labour nomination in the Western Hutt and Island Bay electorates, but was not selected for either.

He left Lower Hutt and moved to Titahi Bay. Shortly afterwards he was elected chairman of the Porirua Labour local body committee and briefly "had thoughts" of running as a candidate for the Porirua City Council.

=== Porirua City Council ===
Following the retirement of Porirua's Town Clerk (the then title of the chief executive officer) Gordon Gandell in 1980 he applied for the position. His appointment, shortly before the 1980 local body elections, triggered one of the biggest local body dust-ups ever, with allegations that it had been a "jack up" by the Labour majority on the Porirua City Council and his friendship with John Burke. A group of senior Porirua City Council officers jointly signed a letter during the appointment row saying he wasn't the right man for the job. Seddon was not an accountant, the usual prior professional qualification of town clerks at that time, but he had been responsible for managing a company with three times the asset turnover of the Porirua City Council. Ombudsman Lester Castle was called in and eventually cleared the appointment process as being sufficiently objective. Following the 1980 elections, Labour lost their majority on the council. There was also speculation his role as Town Clerk was a stopgap until he could fill the safe Labour seat of Porirua in Parliament, then occupied by the ageing Gerry Wall, who retired in 1987.

Once confirmed in the role he had to deal with a council in large debt and declining commercial activity in the area. In the mid to late 1980s wastewater services were modernised and in the 1990s commercial development was focused on. He served under three mayors of Porirua (Whitford Brown, John Burke and Jenny Brash) and was instrumental in several of the city's social, economic and physical developments. They include the construction of North City Shopping Centre, a wastewater treatment plant in Titahi Bay, the Porirua MegaCentre, Pataka, the Porirua Aquatic Centre, expansion of Porirua Park and the purchase of Aotea Block. He was also a proponent for the development of the Pataka Museum of Arts and Cultures. By 1997 he had become the country's longest serving local body chief executive.

=== Later life and death ===
In retirement Seddon made a point of avoiding anything related to local government, stating "Once you're gone, you should stay gone. Otherwise, you're just meddling." He even went as far as to decline an invitation to the official dinner for Porirua City's 50th anniversary in October 2015.

Seddon died on 30 November 2021. He was survived by his second wife Barbara and seven of his eight children.

== Honorific eponym ==
John Seddon Drive in Porirua was named after him in 2012.

== Notes ==
Political offices
Preceded by Dave Hadley	Deputy Mayor of Lower Hutt; 1971–1974	Succeeded by Chen Werry
Civic offices
Preceded by Gordon Gandell	CEO of the Porirua City Council; 1980–2000	Succeeded by Roger Blakeley
