= Īhāia Puketapu =

New Zealand tribal leader, butcher, roading contractor and labourer

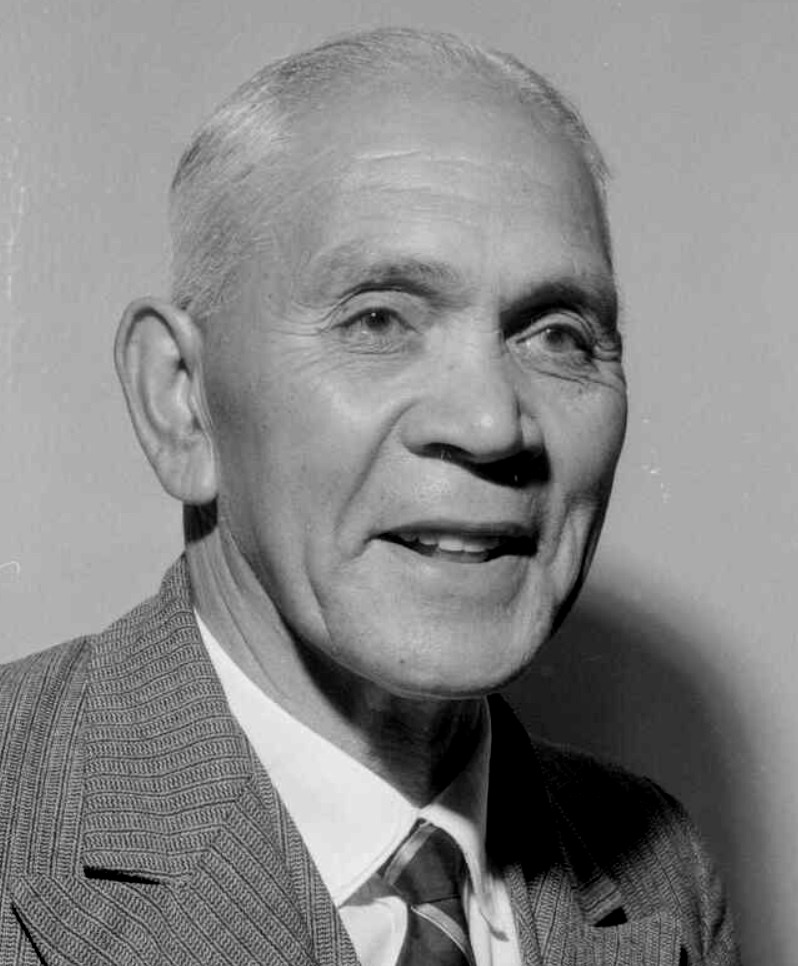
Puketapu in 1960

Īhāia Pōrutu Puketapu OBE (7 February 1887 – 1 July 1971) was a New Zealand tribal leader, butcher, roading contractor and labourer. Of Māori descent, he identified with the Te Āti Awa iwi. He was born in Waiwhetū, New Zealand, on 7 February 1887.

== Biography ==
As a young man, he was trained by the prophet Te Whiti at Parihaka, before returning to the Wellington region. A dedicated Christian, he was an advocator for Christian pacifism.

He was active in the early New Zealand Labour Party and had close friendships with Peter Fraser and Walter Nash; he was active in the campaign for the Maori Social and Economic Advancement Act 1945. He met with Fraser to reaffirm the ownership of the 100-acre block where he lived as having been set aside for Māori under the Wakefield land settlement so that the land there would be used for state built rental homes for Māori. He stood as a Labour candidate for the Lower Hutt City Council, unsuccessfully, at the 1947 local-body elections.

Puketapu married Amiria Ake Ake, in Hāwera about 1907, but she died in 1916. He remarried Pākehā Vera May Yeates (1904–1991) on 15 March 1930, at Wellington. They had many children, including Ihakara Puketapu and Erenora Puketapu-Hetet. One of his sons Te Rira (Teri) Puketapu was a Lower Hutt City Councillor from 1974 to 1989. A builder by trade Teri built and renovated the Waiwhetū marae.

In 1953, Puketapu was awarded the Queen Elizabeth II Coronation Medal. In the 1960 Queen's Birthday Honours, he was appointed an Officer of the Order of the British Empire, for social welfare services to Māori youth.

Puketapu died in Lower Hutt on 1 July 1971, aged 84.
