= Chen Werry =

New Zealand businessman and politician

Harcourt Chenoweth "Chen" Werry (16 December 1908 – 5 October 1995) was a New Zealand businessman and politician. He was a Lower Hutt City Councillor for 36 years from 1950 to 1986 and was twice deputy mayor.

== Biography ==
=== Early life and career ===
Werry was born in Christchurch in 1908 to Alfred Ernest Werry and Florence Beatrice Chenoweth, who he labelled 'academics of liberal thinking'. He grew up in the 1920s when his father was working as a headmaster. Two uncles and later a brother were teachers. He was the dux of Belfast School and after passing his proficiency certificate he attended high school after shifting with his family to the West Coast where he attended Reefton District High School, where his father worked. After finishing school he started work as a student teacher, but left after just one week after his father purchased him a used truck with which he "went bush" and worked cutting wood and sold firewood. He then sat the public service examination and passed with the 13th highest in New Zealand. In 1927 he accepted a position working at the Registrar General's Office while studying at Victoria University before returning to the West Coast after two years and resumed his firewood work before falling ill. After recovering from the illness his godmother's husband got him a job at Smith and Smith's, a hardware retailer in Lower Hutt. While boarding a room in Petone in the late-1920s he met Marjorie "Peggy" Hastings who was a member of the same tennis club as him who he later married in 1937.

Deemed unfit for military service due to serious migraines he instead volunteered locally for community and church causes. After the war he opened his own paint, wallpaper and hardware business on Queens Drive, Lower Hutt. He was encouraged by his wife who said if he could earn a living for someone else he could earn one for himself. Later his wife opened her own shop, Werry's Witchcraft, on High Street for several years. He purchased a house in Ariki Street, Lower Hutt via a government loan.

=== Political career ===
He joined the Labour Party in the 1930s and was first nominated to stand for office for a seat on the local licensing committee as, unlike most Labour members, he was a teetotaler. He was Walter Nash's electorate chairman in the Hutt constituency for many years. Werry was opposed to the Labour Party leadership's controversial attempts to force the retirement of older age MPs. He stated at the 1966 party conference that Nash should not be pressured to retire and that Labour was at risk of losing the seat if he were deselected.

He worked with Percy Dowse (later Mayor of Lower Hutt) on the Southern Cross daily newspaper which lasted for five years. Dowse encouraged him to stand for the Lower Hutt City Council at the 1944 elections. He was unsuccessful, but stood again six years later at the 1950 election and won. Werry was a Lower Hutt City Councillor from 1950–86, the longest ever serving member. He was twice Deputy Mayor 1962–68 and 1974–77 and was chair of the Town Planning and Works and Drainage Committees. He was also a member of the Hutt Valley Drainage Board, Hutt River Board and Wellington Regional Council.

He regarded the fluoridation of Lower Hutt's drinking water supply in 1957 as his greatest achievement. As chairman of the council's waterworks committee he worked hard to convince fellow councillors and a skeptical public of the benefits. As deputy mayor in the 1960s he supported Dowse's plan to develop the new suburbs of Maungaraki and Stokes Valley. In early 1968 he was acting-mayor for six weeks while Dowse was overseas. When Dowse died in 1970 Werry had a, in his own words, "moment of momentary madness" when he considered standing for the mayoralty. While thinking himself able to fulfil the administrative duties of mayor he was dissuaded at the thought of the social aspect of hosting local functions.

After his first 21 years on the council representing the Labour Party, in 1971 he was invited by mayor John Kennedy-Good to join his "combined" ticket for that years election. Thinking that the Labour Party was not intending to put up a ticket of their own, Werry and three other Labour councillors joined the combined team. Labour did eventually decide to run its own ticket and party policy dictated that members could not stand for election against official party candidates resulting in Werry having his Labour membership suspended. He was re-elected and was elected Kennedy-Good's deputy. At the same election his son, Richard John Werry, won a seat on the council on the Labour ticket. Dick Werry was a company director and had previously been elected a member of the Hutt Valley Electric Power and Gas Board.

Werry was an outspoken critic of modern art and its prominence in the council funded Dowse Art Museum. In 1977 when museum director Jim Barr purchased the controversial Colin McCahon work, Wall of Death, Werry said that the museum catered for "way out tastes" and went as far to say he felt like "smashing the place up". Werry claimed McCahon's work was so talentless that he could "knock up something similar" in just his lunchbreak and would go on national television to prove it. He appeared on TV 1 programme Good Day, dressed in an artist's smock with a beret, he painted his own work in front of art critic Professor John Roberts who stated it "wasn't a bad effort". Werry disagreed saying "It's just typical of modern art, No talent is needed, no ability to draw. It is completely without perspective. It is an ideal subject for the Dowse Art Gallery." The museum declined to exhibit Werry's painting, however by 2009 the McCahon painting was worth $1.7 million.

After several terms on the United Citizens ticket he returned to the Labour Party before leaving, voluntarily on this occasion, to join another "combined" ticket organised by councillor Gerald Bond in 1986. By this time local government amalgamations were a dominant issue, which Werry opposed. Werry (alongside all Combined Progressive Group candidates) were defeated at the 1986 elections. When asked about himself about his defeat he stated that he would "start working for himself instead of the people".

=== Later life and death ===
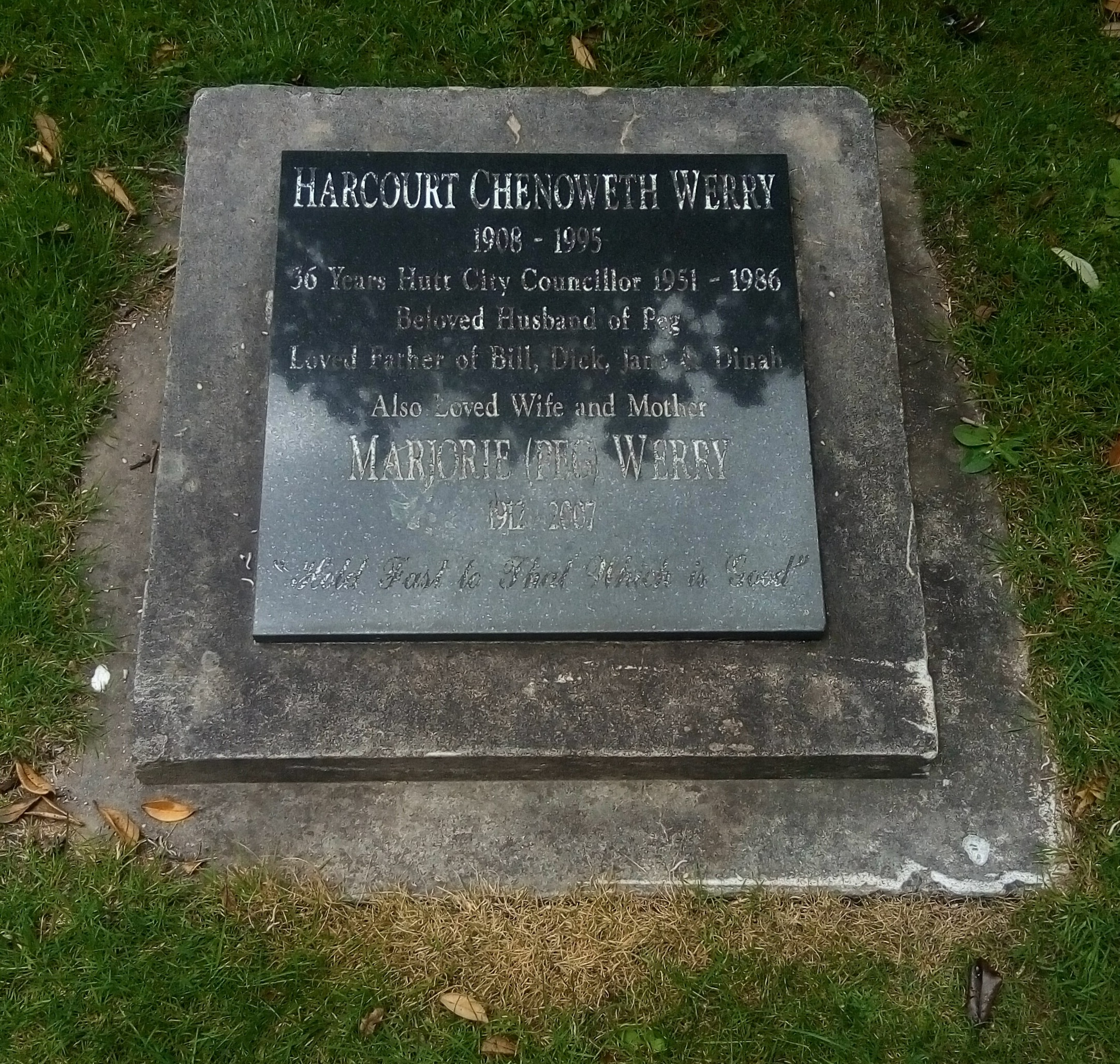
Werry's grave in Lower Hutt

Werry died suddenly in Otaki on 5 October 1995. He is buried in St. James Churchyard, Lower Hutt.

== Honorific eponym ==
Harcourt Werry Drive in the Lower Hutt City suburb of Avalon was named after him.

Political offices
Preceded by George Barker	Deputy Mayor of Lower Hutt; 1962–68 1974–77	Succeeded by Dave Hadley
Preceded by John Seddon	Deputy Mayor of Lower Hutt; 1962–68 1974–77	Succeeded by Ernie Barry
