= Lower Hutt Citizens' Association =

- Founded: 1905
- Dissolved: 1992
- Ideology: Fiscal conservatism Nonpartisanism; Localism
- Political position: Centre-right

The Lower Hutt Citizens' Association, was a right-leaning local body electoral ticket in Lower Hutt, New Zealand. It was formed in 1945 by merging the selection process of council candidates of several civic interest groups and business lobby groups. Its main ambitions were to continue to control the Lower Hutt City Council, reduce local spending and deny left-leaning Labour Party candidates election.

== History ==
The Citizens' Association was formed on a permanent basis in 1945, growing out of the Ratepayers' Association which was founded in 1905. Previously electoral tickets had existed only at election periods where candidate tickets were formed by ratepayer groups but had no permanent infrastructure and was inactive outside election periods. From the 1930s on, the Labour Party had been steadily winning more votes in local elections and it was thought an opposing ticket was necessary to defeat them. Similar associations of citizens and ratepayers had existed in Wellington and other cities in New Zealand on which Lower Hutt modelled theirs on.

The party system in local politics in Lower Hutt was upended as a result of the 1971 election after the Citizens' Association did not select incumbent mayor John Kennedy-Good as their candidate at that years election. Kennedy-Good had been elected by councillors (where the Citizens' had a majority) as mayor in December 1970 for the remainder of the term after the death of Labour mayor Percy Dowse but the Citizens' selection committee chose the deputy mayor Dave Hadley to contest the 1971 election. Undeterred, Kennedy-Good formed his own "combined" electoral ticket with which to contest the election. The Citizens' performed poorly at the election where Hadley came a distant third (Kennedy-Good narrowly beat Labour's John Seddon) and only won three of the fifteen council seats.

The Citizens' Association made peace with Kennedy-Good by the 1974 election and by 1980 his combined ticket merged back in to the association as the "United Citizens" ticket which won all but one seat on the council at that years election. The unity was short-lived however and another split occurred in the lead up to the 1986 election when Gerald Bond, a councillor and chairman of the Hutt Valley Energy Board, formed a "combined progressive" electoral ticket after losing the United Citizens nomination for mayor to Glen Evans. The United Citizens won in a landslide with majority of councillors and Evans winning the mayoralty against Labour councillor Alister Abernethy. Bond came a distant third for mayor and lost his council and energy board seat. All of his ticket (which included several incumbents) were defeated. Evans was expecting a closer result and had thought Bond would be a close second.
