= 1941 Lower Hutt mayoral election =

← 1938	17 May 1941	1944 →
- Turnout: 6,136 (47.69%)
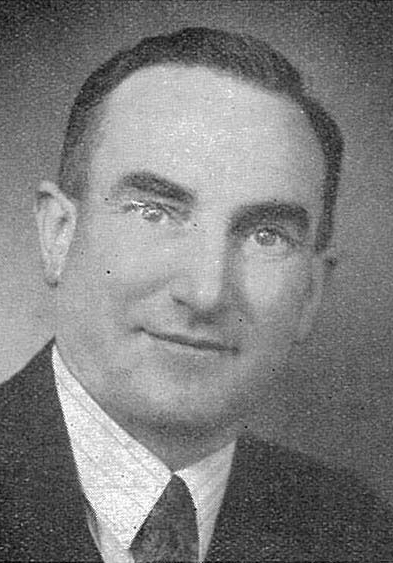

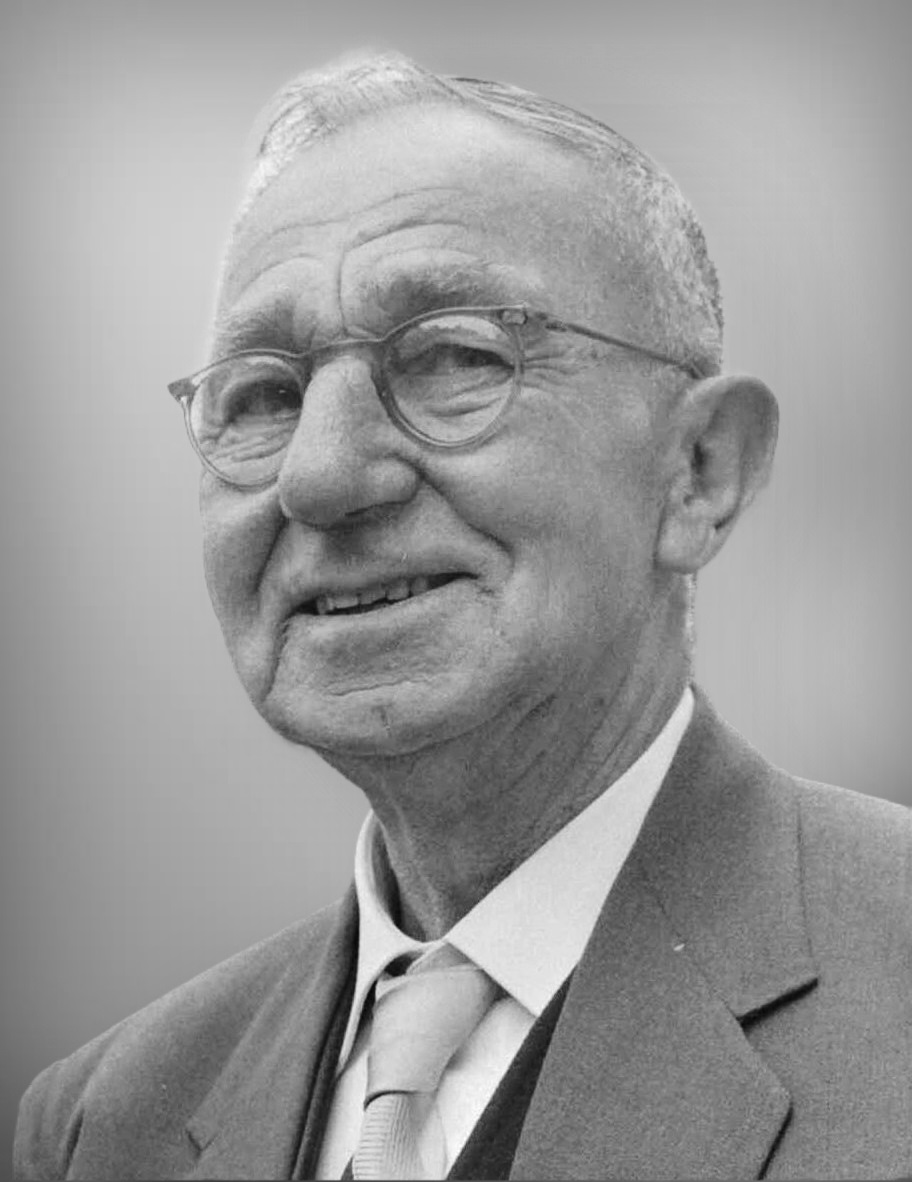
Candidate	Jack Andrews	Harry Horlor
Party	Citizens'	Labour
Popular vote	3,616	2,464
Percentage	58.93	40.16
Mayor before election
Jack Andrews
Elected mayor
Jack Andrews

The 1941 Lower Hutt mayoral election was part of the New Zealand local elections held that same year. The elections were held for the role of Mayor of Lower Hutt plus other local government positions including the nine city councillors, also elected triennially. The polling was conducted using the standard first-past-the-post electoral method.

== Background ==
The incumbent Mayor, Jack Andrews, sought re-election for a fourth term. Andrews was opposed by Labour Party candidate Henry Valentine Horlor who had been a councillor since 1938. The election occurred in the shadow of the infamous 'Nathan Incident', a political scandal that developed in nearby Wellington revolving around Hubert Nathan, a Citizens' Association candidate for the Wellington Harbour Board who was critical of the number of union secretaries on the Labour ticket for the 1941 civic elections. Nathan alleged that 5 unionists used "Gestapo tactics" to try and blackmail him into withdrawing his nomination and accusing them of Antisemitism. The press ran articles on the alleged confrontation (which was refuted by Labour) and as a result Labour candidates struggled in the election with a decisive Citizens' victory.

== Mayoral results ==
1941 Lower Hutt mayoral election
Party	Candidate	Votes	%	±%
Citizens'	Jack Andrews	3,616	58.93	+8.23
Labour	Harry Horlor	2,464	40.16	
Informal votes		56	0.91	−1.05
Majority		1,152	18.77	+16.81
Turnout		6,136	47.69	−11.46

== Councillor results ==
1941 Lower Hutt local election
Party	Candidate	Votes	%	±%
Citizens'	Stan Dudding	3,412	55.60	
Citizens'	Frank Campbell	3,330	54.26	
Citizens'	Gordon Giesen	3,259	53.11	
Citizens'	Ernst Peterson Hay	3,180	51.82	+0.43
Citizens'	William Gregory	3,162	51.53	+0.66
Citizens'	Frederick Seymour Hewer	3,158	51.46	
Citizens'	John Mitchell	3,130	51.01	−0.15
Citizens'	Herbert Muir	3,086	50.29	
Citizens'	Arthur Marshall	2,968	48.37	−4.48
Labour	Bill Morrison	2,759	44.96	−7.51
Labour	Percy Dowse	2,627	42.81	
Labour	Frank Hall	2,525	41.15	−9.85
Labour	Hughie Gilbert Burrell	2,389	38.93	−11.11
Labour	Bella Logie	2,332	38.00	
Labour	John Robert Scott	2,292	37.35	
Labour	Robert Webb Johnson	2,008	32.72	−16.78
Labour	Milton David Gamble	1,933	31.50	
Labour	Herbert William Land	1,892	30.83	
Independent	Charles James Ashton	1,573	25.63	−26.63
Communist	Elsie Freeman	678	11.04	
