= Alexander Charles Begg =

New Zealand radiologist and historian

Charles Begg
- Born: Alexander Charles Begg; 28 February 1912; Wellington, New Zealand
- Died: 23 June 1991 (aged 79); Nelson, New Zealand
- Education: University of Otago
- Spouse: Margaret Annie Birks (m. 1941; died 1989)
- Relatives: Charles Begg (father); Neil Begg (brother); Campbell Begg (uncle); Lawrence Birks (father-in-law)

Alexander Charles Begg (28 February 1912 – 23 June 1991) was a New Zealand radiologist and historian. He was one of the leaders in the development of radiology as a distinct specialty in New Zealand, and with his brother, Neil, he wrote four books on the history of Fiordland.

== Early life and family ==
Born in Wellington on 28 February 1912, Begg was the older son of surgeon Charles Mackie Begg and Lillian Helen Lawrance Begg (née Treadwell), and nephew of Robert Campbell Begg. His father served throughout World War I, becoming the senior medical officer with the New Zealand Expeditionary Force, but contracted influenza and pneumonia and died at Twickenham, London, in February 1919. Begg and his mother and brother, who had travelled to England at the end of the war, then returned to New Zealand.

Begg was educated at John McGlashan College in Dunedin, and went on to study medicine at the University of Otago, graduating MB ChB in 1936. A tall man, Begg was an Otago provincial golf representative.

On 1 February 1941, Begg married Margaret Annie Birks (24 March 1910 – 29 May 1989), at Silverstream. Also a doctor, Birks had been in the same graduating class as Begg at Otago. She was a daughter of electrical engineer Lawrence Birks. The couple went on to have five children.

== Medical career ==
Begg worked as a house surgeon at Dunedin Hospital, before travelling to London in 1937 to become a surgeon. However, World War II intervened before he was able to take his final examination, and after contracting rheumatic fever he returned to New Zealand in 1941. He then decided to study radiology, and in 1946 became the first person to gain a diploma of diagnostic radiology at the University of Otago. He graduated MD the following year. Awarded a Nuffield Scholarship, he undertook study in Britain, North America and Scandinavia in 1949 and 1950.

In 1956 Begg was appointed head of diagnostic radiology at Dunedin Hospital, and in 1971 he became an associate professor in that specialty at Otago Medical School, retiring in 1977. He played an important role in the founding of the Neurological Association of New Zealand in 1957, and was actively involved in the Royal College of Radiologists of Australasia.

== Historian and conservationist ==
Begg and his brother Neil became experts on the history of Fiordland. Their first book, Dusky Bay, was published in 1966 and won the Hubert Church Memorial Award for prose. They subsequently published James Cook and New Zealand in 1969, Port Preservation in 1973, and The World of John Boultbee in 1979.

He served as president of the Otago branch of the Royal Forest and Bird Protection Society of New Zealand.

== Death ==
Begg died in Nelson on 23 June 1991, his wife having pre-deceased him in 1989.
