= 1947 Lower Hutt mayoral election =

← 1944	19 November 1947	1949 →
- Turnout: 11,626 (49.04%)
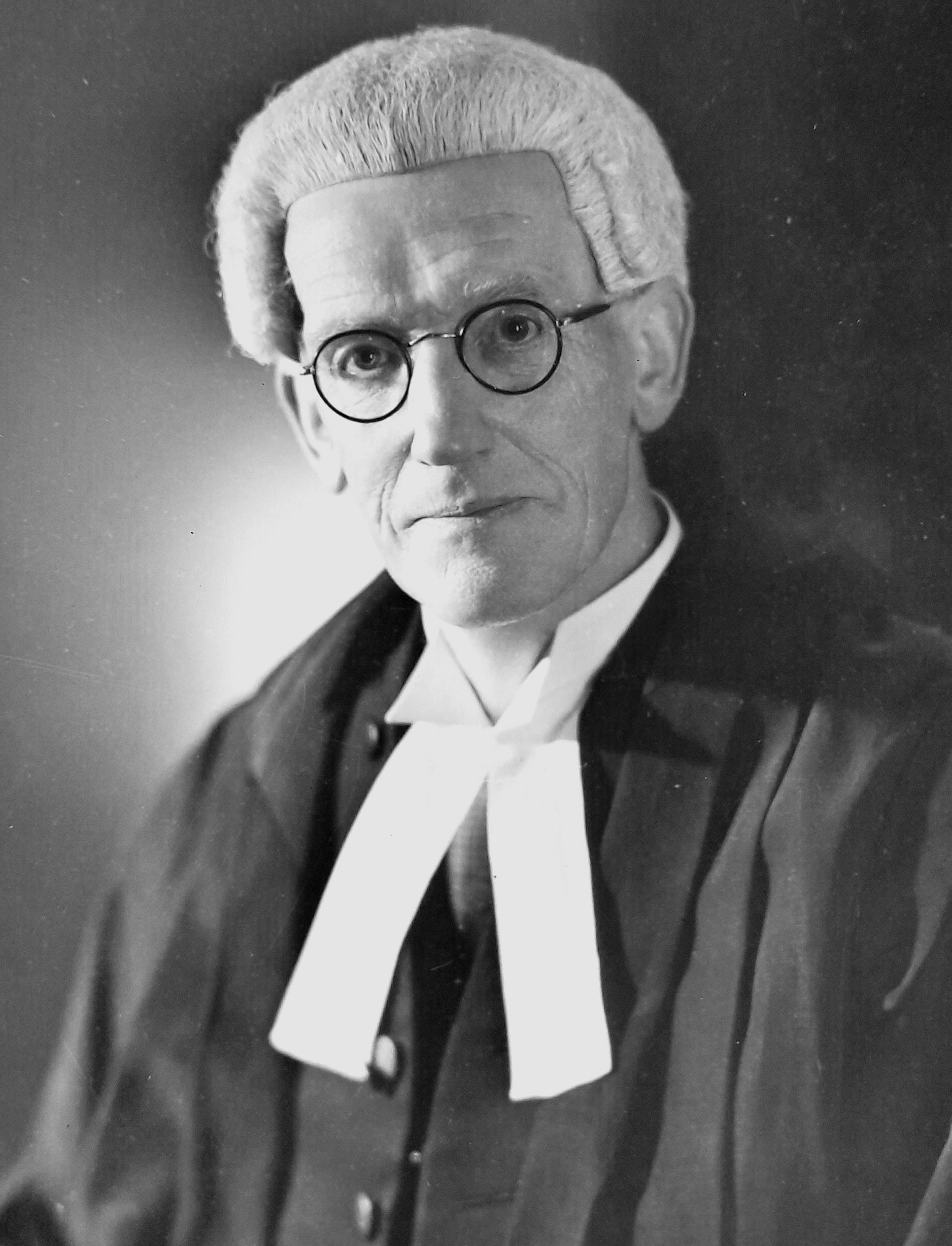

Candidate	Ernst Peterson Hay	Harry Saunders
Party	Citizens'	Labour
Popular vote	6,109	5,453
Percentage	52.54	46.91
Mayor before election
Ernst Peterson Hay
Elected mayor
Ernst Peterson Hay

The 1947 Lower Hutt mayoral election was part of the New Zealand local elections held that same year. The elections were held for the role of Mayor of Lower Hutt plus other local government positions including twelve city councillors, also elected triennially. The polling was conducted using the standard first-past-the-post electoral method.

== Background ==
The winner of the previous mayoral election, Jack Andrews, resigned towards the end of his fifth term. The council did not hold a by-election due to the closeness to the regularly scheduled election and instead the councillors elected Ernst Peterson Hay in June 1947 to finish the remainder of the term. Hay stood in the election where he was opposed by Labour's Henry "Harry" Saunders who was the chairman of the Boulcott School Committee and president of the Epuni-Waiwhetu branch of the Labour Party. Taking place during a period of rapid population growth in the area, it was the first election after the addition of the new suburb of Taita. Hay won the mayoralty and Saunders was elected a member of both the Hutt Valley Electric Power Board and Petone and Lower Hutt Gas Board, serving for just over a year until his death in December 1948.

== Mayoral results ==
1947 Lower Hutt mayoral election
Party	Candidate	Votes	%	±%
Citizens'	Ernst Peterson Hay	6,109	52.54	
Labour	Harry Saunders	5,453	46.91	
Informal votes		64	0.55	−0.27
Majority		656	5.64	
Turnout		11,626	49.04	−4.11

== Councillor results ==
1947 Lower Hutt local election
Party	Candidate	Votes	%	±%
Labour	Harry Horlor	6,195	57.36	+9.58
Citizens'	Jim Vogel	6,052	56.03	
Labour	Bella Logie	5,788	53.59	+10.89
Citizens'	Will Giltrap	5,723	52.99	
Labour	Percy Dowse	5,715	52.91	
Citizens'	William Gregory	5,660	52.40	+1.64
Labour	Hughie Gilbert Burrell	5,617	52.00	
Citizens'	Eric Rothwell	5,546	51.35	+4.77
Citizens'	Frank Lonsdale	5,531	51.21	+5.55
Citizens'	Briton Matthews	5,433	50.30	+28.15
Citizens'	Herbert Beazley	5,392	49.92	
Labour	Trevor Young	5,373	49.75	
Citizens'	Herbert Muir	5,360	49.62	+0.01
Citizens'	George Austad	5,302	49.09	
Citizens'	Dick Simpson	5,206	48.20	
Labour	Īhāia Puketapu	5,199	48.13	
Citizens'	Charles Howard Hain	5,139	47.58	
Citizens'	Horace George Lewis	5,137	47.56	+4.65
Labour	Jessie Woods	5,002	46.31	
Labour	Andrew James Tate	4,935	45.69	
Labour	Robert Henry Ellis	4,902	45.38	
Labour	Ronald George Maxwell	4,877	45.15	
Labour	Norman Stanislaus Wilson	4,701	43.52	
Labour	Ron Woolford	4,484	41.51	
Independent	Aden Seafield Lyons	1,234	11.42	+3.90
