= 1944 Lower Hutt mayoral election =

← 1941	27 May 1947	1947 →
- Turnout: 9,037 (53.15%)
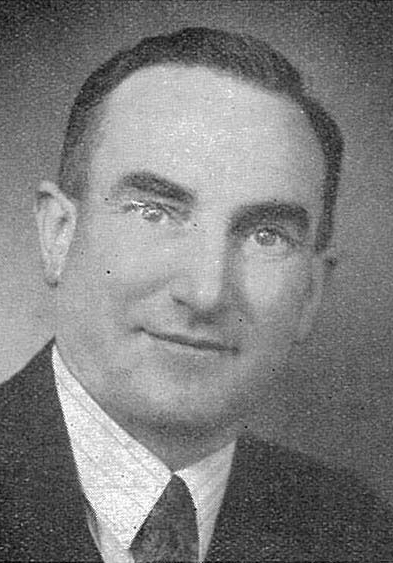

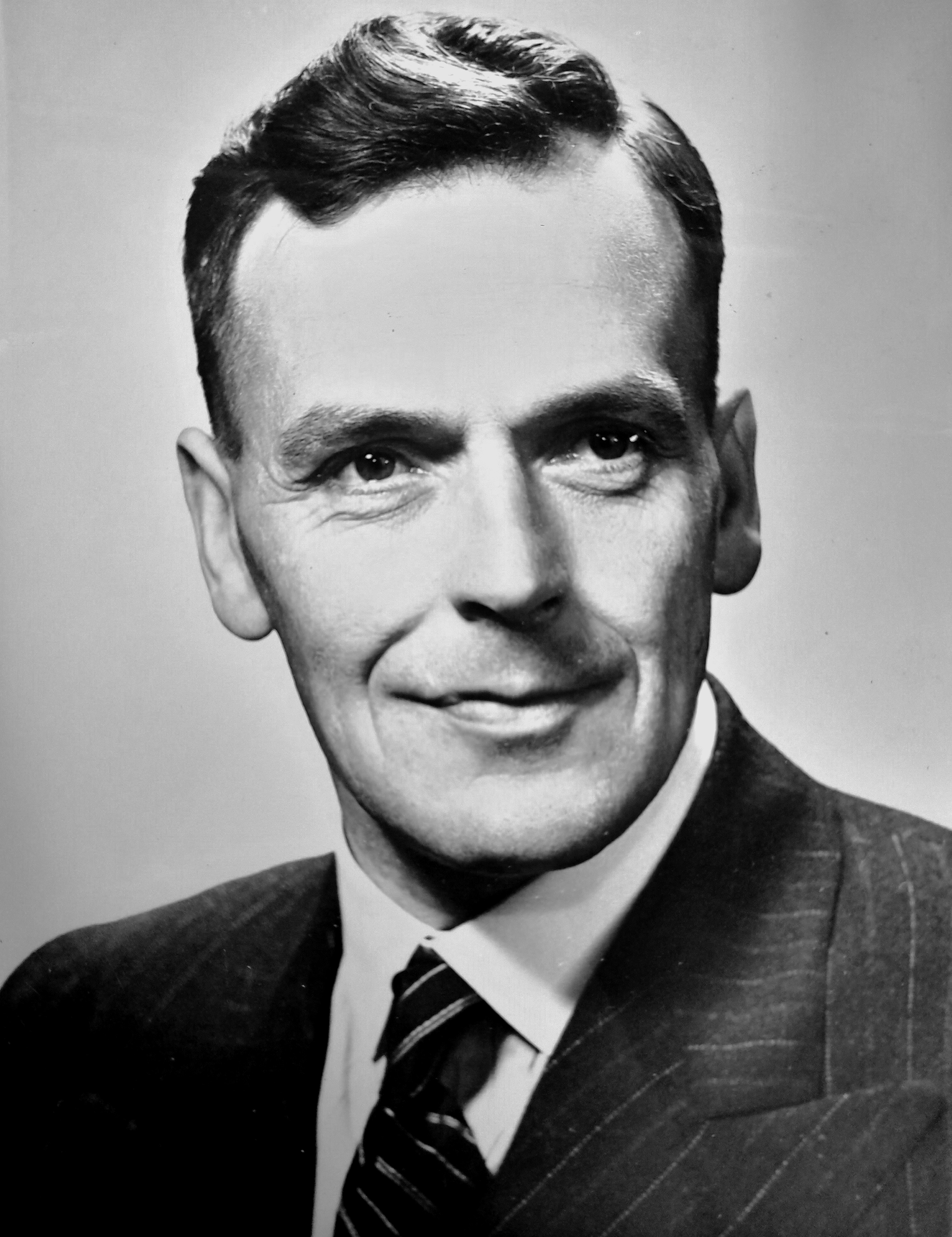
Candidate	Jack Andrews	Percy Dowse
Party	Citizens'	Labour
Popular vote	5,347	3,616
Percentage	59.16	40.02
Mayor before election
Jack Andrews
Elected mayor
Jack Andrews

The 1944 Lower Hutt mayoral election was part of the New Zealand local elections held that same year. The elections were held for the role of Mayor of Lower Hutt plus other local government positions including twelve city councillors, also elected triennially. The polling was conducted using the standard first-past-the-post electoral method.

== Background ==
The incumbent Mayor, Jack Andrews, sought re-election for a sixth term. Andrews was opposed by Labour Party candidate Percy Dowse, a councillor between 1935 and 1938, who had challenged Andrews in 1938. Taking place during a period of rapid population growth in the area, it was the first election after the addition of the new suburbs of Epuni, Waddington and Naenae.

== Mayoral results ==
1944 Lower Hutt mayoral election
Party	Candidate	Votes	%	±%
Citizens'	Jack Andrews	5,347	59.16	+0.23
Labour	Percy Dowse	3,616	40.02	
Informal votes		74	0.82	−0.09
Majority		1,731	19.15	+0.38
Turnout		9,037	53.15	+5.46

== Councillor results ==
1944 Lower Hutt City Council election
Party	Candidate	Votes	%	±%
Citizens'	Stan Dudding	5,141	56.88	+1.28
Citizens'	William Gregory	4,588	50.76	−0.77
Citizens'	Ernst Peterson Hay	4,564	50.50	−1.32
Citizens'	Herbert Muir	4,484	49.61	−0.68
Citizens'	Gordon Giesen	4,391	48.58	−4.53
Citizens'	Frederick Seymour Hewer	4,390	48.57	−2.89
Labour	Harry Horlor	4,318	47.78	
Citizens'	Eric Rothwell	4,210	46.58	
Citizens'	Frank Lonsdale	4,127	45.66	
Citizens'	John Barker Young (Note: Young resigned in December 1946 and was replaced by Harry Shearer via appointment.)	4,125	45.64	
Citizens'	Gordon Hector Phillips	3,980	44.04	
Citizens'	Horace George Lewis	3,878	42.91	
Labour	Bella Logie	3,859	42.70	+4.70
Labour	David Pritchard	3,844	42.53	
Labour	John Vernon Burton	3,723	41.19	
Citizens'	Arthur John Hyder	3,714	41.09	
Labour	Sam Chesney	3,692	40.85	
Labour	James McDonald	3,515	38.89	
Labour	Frank Hall	3,502	38.75	−2.40
Labour	James W.R. Gibbons	3,339	36.94	
Labour	Marmaduke McTaggart	3,257	36.04	
Labour	Chen Werry	3,216	35.58	
Labour	Harold Burton Wakerley	2,999	33.18	
Labour	Alfred Robert Darkins	2,975	32.92	
Independent	Norm Croft	2,664	29.47	
Independent	Briton Matthews	2,002	22.15	
Independent	John Bertram Grey	1,793	19.84	
Independent	Aden Seafield Lyons	680	7.52	

Table footnotes:
