= Neil Begg =

New Zealand paediatrician, historian and cricketer

Sir Neil Begg KBE
- Born: Neil Colquhoun Begg; 13 April 1915; Dunedin, New Zealand
- Died: 25 June 1995 (aged 80); Dunedin, New Zealand
- Education: University of Otago
- Spouse: Margaret Milne MacLean (m. 1942)
- Relatives: Charles Mackie Begg (father); Alexander Charles Begg (brother); Robert Campbell Begg (uncle)
- Cricket career

Cricket information
- Batting: Right-handed
- Bowling: Right-arm medium
- Role: Bowler

Domestic team information
- Years: Team
- 1939/40–1940/41: Otago
- FC debut: 23 December 1939 Otago v Canterbury
- Last FC: 24 December 1940 Otago v Canterbury

Career statistics
Competition	First-class
Matches	3
Runs scored	30
Batting average	10.00
100s/50s	0/0
Top score	16
Balls bowled	350
Wickets	5
Bowling average	47.60
5 wickets in innings	0
10 wickets in match	0
Best bowling	2/43
Catches/stumpings	1/–
- Source: CricketArchive, 5 May 2016

Sir Neil Colquhoun Begg KBE (13 April 1915 – 25 June 1995) was a New Zealand paediatrician, historian and cricketer. He played three first-class matches for the Otago cricket team after the beginning of World War II, but he is most noted as a paediatrician and an historian. He served as director of medical services for the Plunket Society from 1956 to 1977, and, with his brother Charles, wrote four books on the history of Fiordland. He chaired the New Zealand Historic Places Trust between 1978 and 1986.

== Early life and family ==
Born in Dunedin on 13 April 1915, Begg was the younger son of surgeon Charles Mackie Begg and Lillian Helen Lawrance Begg (née Treadwell), and nephew of Robert Campbell Begg. His father served throughout World War I, becoming the senior medical officer with the New Zealand Expeditionary Force, but contracted influenza and pneumonia and died at Twickenham, London, in February 1919. Begg and his mother and brother, who had travelled to England at the end of the war, then returned to New Zealand.

Begg was educated at John McGlashan College in Dunedin, and then studied medicine at the University of Otago, graduating MB ChB in 1941. A tall man, Begg was an all-round sportsman, and represented the university at cricket, golf and skiing.

On 11 April 1942, Begg married Margaret Milne "Margot" MacLean, a librarian, at Dunedin. She was a granddaughter of John Shand, one of the foundation professors of the University of Otago. The couple went on to have four children.

== World War II service ==
In February 1941, Begg was commissioned as a lieutenant in the New Zealand Medical Corps, and posted to the Otago University Medical Company. He went on to serve in the Middle East, Italy and the United Kingdom with the 2nd New Zealand Expeditionary Force, rising to the rank of major.

== Cricket ==
A right-arm medium pace bowler and a tail-end batsman, Begg played three first-class matches for Otago in the 1939/40 and 1940/41 seasons. He took five wickets, at an average of 47.60, with best bowling figures of 2 for 43. With the bat, he made a total of 30 runs in four innings including one not out, with a high score of 16 and an average of 10.00.

Begg played one match for New Zealand Services, on 12 July 1945, against P.F. Warner's XI at Lord's, bowling 11 overs without success and scoring 1 not out with the bat.

== Medical career ==
Between 1946 and 1948, Begg trained in paediatrics in London, Edinburgh and Stockholm, earning a diploma in child health in 1947, and membership of the Royal College of Physicians and the Royal College of Physicians of Edinburgh in 1948. Returning to Dunedin the following year, he was appointed as a paediatrician at Dunedin Hospital, Queen Mary Maternity Hospital, and the Karitane-Harris Hospital in Andersons Bay. He was also a lecturer in paediatrics at the Otago Medical School from 1949 to 1976.

An admirer of Sir Truby King, Begg served as medical director of the Plunket Society between 1956 and 1977, and was a leading advocate for preventive medicine. He campaigned for the fluoridation of public water supplies, the eradication of hydatids and bovine tuberculosis, and the development of a milk biscuit for protein-deprived children in developing countries. Between 1971 and 1976 he served as the medical advisor to the New Zealand Food Bank, which distributed the biscuits overseas. His parental reference book, The New Zealand child and his family, was published in 1970.

Begg gave service to various professional bodies, as president of the Paediatric Society of New Zealand, chair of the council of the New Zealand branch of the British Medical Association from 1964 to 1966, and president of the New Zealand Medical Association in 1974.

== Historian ==
Begg and his brother Charles became experts on the history of Fiordland. Their first book, Dusky Bay, was published in 1966 and won the Hubert Church Memorial Award for prose. This was followed by the publication of James Cook and New Zealand in 1969, Port Preservation in 1973, and The World of John Boultbee in 1979.

He served on the council of the New Zealand Historic Places Trust from 1970 to 1978, and as the trust's chair between 1978 and 1986.

== Honours ==
Begg was elected a fellow of the Royal College of Physicians of Edinburgh in 1957, the New Zealand Medical Association in 1976, and the Royal College of Physicians in 1977.

In the 1972 New Year Honours, Begg was appointed an Officer of the Order of the British Empire, for services to the community. He was promoted to Knight Commander of the same order, for services to the New Zealand Historic Places Trust and the community, in the 1986 New Year Honours.

== Death ==
Begg died at his home in the Dunedin suburb of Maori Hill on 25 June 1995. His wife died in Dunedin in 2006.
