= 1935 Lower Hutt mayoral election =

- 7 May 1935
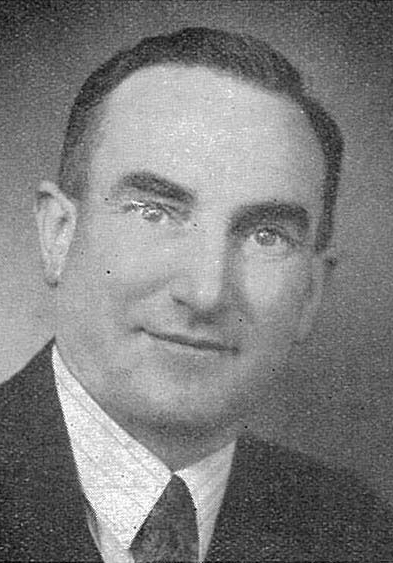
Candidate	Jack Andrews
Party	Legion
Popular vote	elected unopposed
Mayor before election
Jack Andrews
Independent
Elected mayor
Jack Andrews
Legion

The 1935 Lower Hutt mayoral election was part of the New Zealand local elections held that same year. The elections were held for the role of Mayor of Lower Hutt plus other local government positions including the nine borough councillors, also elected biannually. The polling was conducted using the standard first-past-the-post electoral method.

The election saw the re-election of Jack Andrews, who ran unopposed.

== Background ==
Jack Andrews, the incumbent Mayor sought re-election and retained office by being declared elected unopposed with no other candidates emerging.

The Labour Party put up an official ticket for the election, but chose not to stand a candidate for the mayoralty. It instead decided to put all its resources in to winning a majority on the council, thinking this was the best way to achieve their policies. They were opposed by the politically right-leaning New Zealand Legion. It was the first occasion the Legion had contested an election. The Legion's mayoral candidate (Andrews) was elected unopposed and a majority of Legion candidates were elected to the council. It also had candidates elected to the Wellington Hospital Board, Hutt Valley Electric Power Board and Hutt River Board. Its candidates for the Wellington Harbour Board and Eastbourne Borough Council were all defeated however. The Legion's president, Dr Campbell Begg, said he was pleased with the results.

== Councillor results ==
1935 Lower Hutt local election
Party	Candidate	Votes	%	±%
Legion	Murdoch Macaskill	2,176	64.55	
Legion	Charles James Ashton	1,912	56.71	+5.86
Legion	John Mitchell	1,904	56.48	+9.37
Legion	Wilfred Barton Rainey	1,863	55.26	
Legion	Joseph Sidney Dallenger	1,654	49.06	
Legion	Roy Russell	1,626	48.23	
Labour	Frank Hall	1,618	47.99	
Legion	Walter Cole	1,616	47.93	
Labour	Percy Dowse	1,611	47.78	
Labour	Charles Fenwick Hart	1,541	45.71	
Labour	Ronald George Maxwell	1,530	45.38	
Labour	Robert Webb Johnson	1,494	44.31	
Legion	Albert Frederick William Jackson	1,453	43.10	+4.81
Legion	Harry Esmond Grieg	1,435	42.56	
Labour	Joseph Taylor	1,367	40.55	
Independent	James Eric Napier	1,343	39.83	−9.83
Independent	William Henry Wilson	1,220	36.19	−16.12
Independent	Percy Norman Player	1,133	33.61	
Independent	Richard James Joseph Burke	982	29.13	−15.24
Independent	Frank Malcolm Thessman	867	25.71	−12.04
