= 1938 Lower Hutt mayoral election =

- 11 May 1938
- Turnout: 6,066 (59.15%)
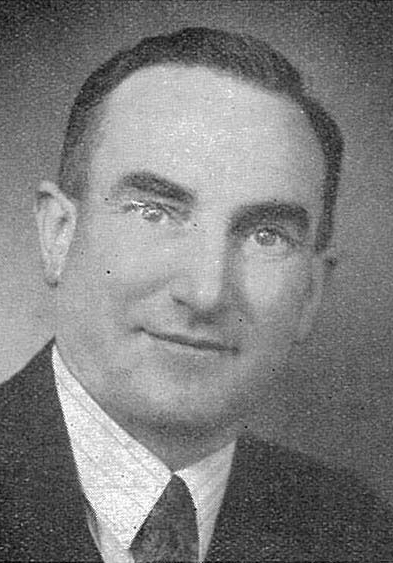

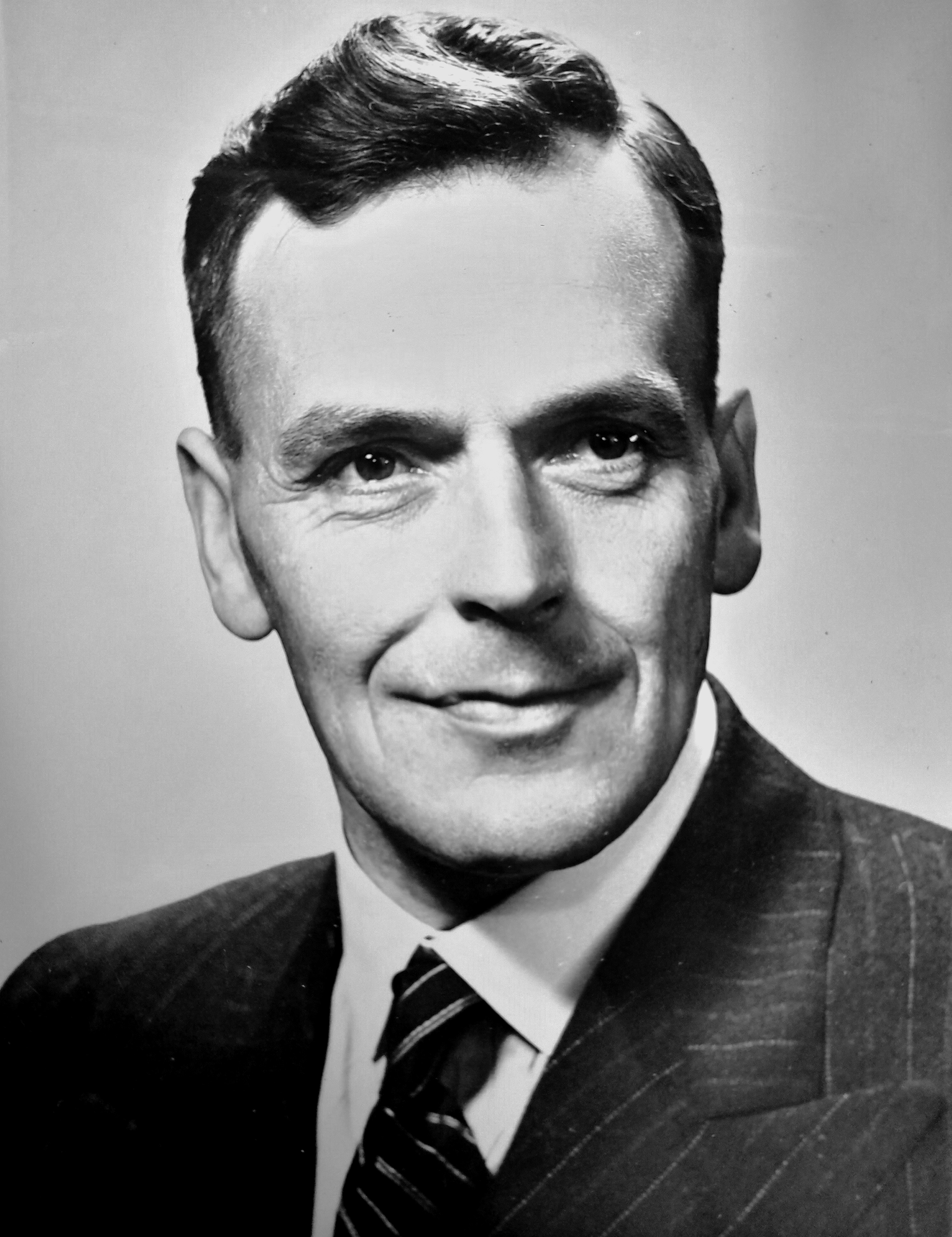
Candidate	Jack Andrews	Percy Dowse
Party	Citizens'	Labour
Popular vote	3,076	2,957
Percentage	50.70	48.74
Mayor before election
Jack Andrews
Elected mayor
Jack Andrews

The 1938 Lower Hutt mayoral election was part of the New Zealand local elections held that same year. The elections were held for the role of Mayor of Lower Hutt plus other local government positions including the nine borough councillors, also elected triennially. The polling was conducted using the standard first-past-the-post electoral method.

== Background ==
The incumbent Mayor, Jack Andrews, sought re-election for a third term. Andrews was opposed by Labour Party candidate Percy Dowse who had been a councillor since 1935. The election marked the first where electoral terms for local government were extended from two years to three.

== Mayoral results ==
1938 Lower Hutt mayoral election
Party	Candidate	Votes	%	±%
Citizens'	Jack Andrews	3,076	50.70	
Labour	Percy Dowse	2,957	48.74	
Informal votes		33	0.54	
Majority		119	1.96	
Turnout		6,066	59.15	

== Councillor results ==
1938 Lower Hutt local election
Party	Candidate	Votes	%	±%
Labour	Harry Horlor	2,955	53.27	
Citizens'	Arthur Marshall	2,932	52.85	
Labour	Bill Morrison	2,911	52.47	
Citizens'	Charles James Ashton	2,899	52.26	−4.45
Citizens'	Ernst Peterson Hay	2,851	51.39	
Citizens'	John Mitchell	2,838	51.16	−5.32
Labour	Frank Hall	2,829	51.00	−3.01
Citizens'	William Gregory	2,822	50.87	
Citizens'	Jim Vogel	2,777	50.06	
Labour	Hughie Gilbert Burrell	2,776	50.04	
Citizens'	Cyril George Hedge	2,752	49.61	
Citizens'	Raymond Douglas Smith	2,752	49.61	
Labour	Robert Webb Johnson	2,746	49.50	+5.19
Labour	Herbert Keith Milne	2,727	49.16	
Labour	Thomas Logie	2,696	48.60	
Citizens'	Roy Russell	2,681	48.33	+0.10
Labour	Jack Taylor	2,638	47.55	
Labour	Henry Fairclough	2,341	42.20	
