= 1949 Lower Hutt mayoral by-election =

New Zealand mayoral by-election

← 1947	2 March 1949	1950 →
- Turnout: 8,822 (38.35%)
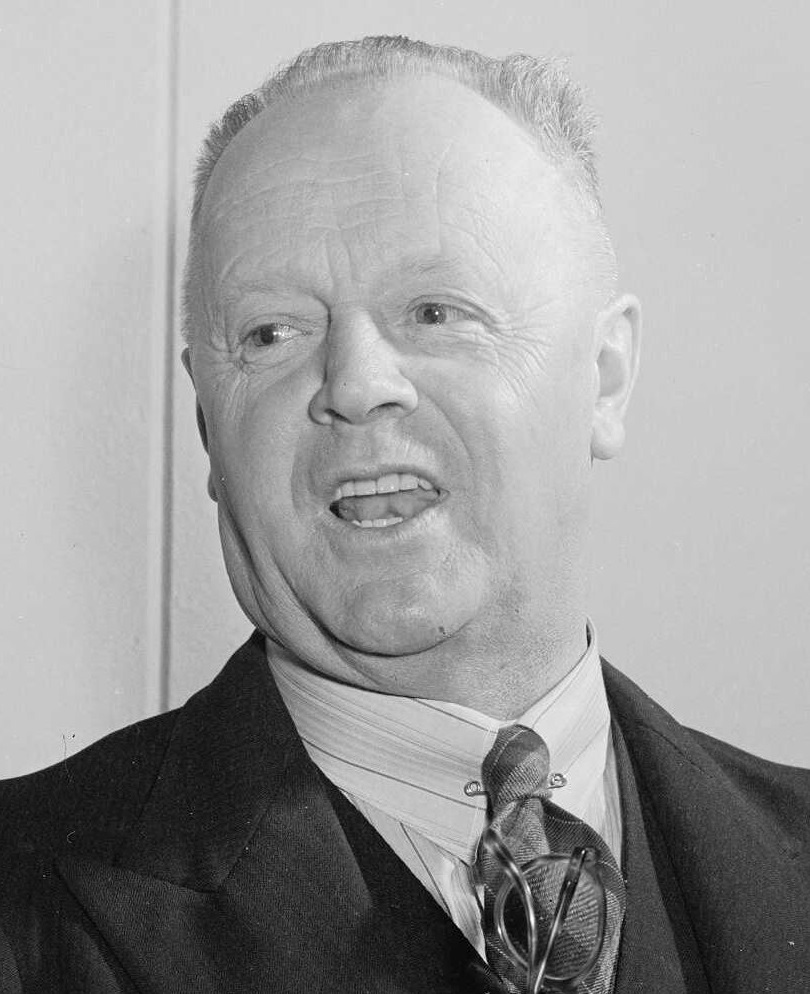

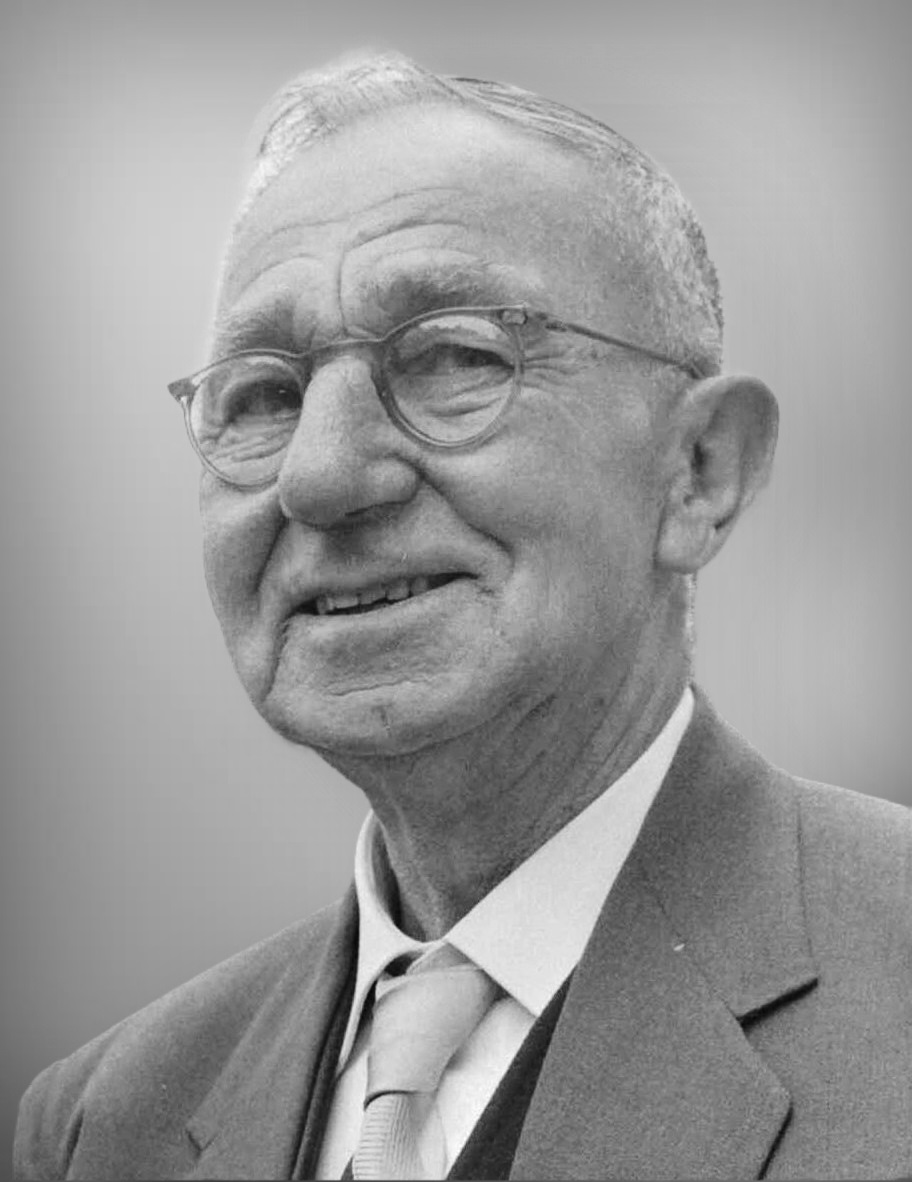
Candidate	William Gregory	Harry Horlor
Party	Citizens'	Labour
Popular vote	4,437	4,345
Percentage	50.29	49.26
Mayor before election
Ernst Peterson Hay
Elected mayor
William Gregory

The 1949 Lower Hutt mayoral by-election was held to elect a successor to Ernst Peterson Hay who resigned as Mayor of Lower Hutt upon his appointment as a judge of the Supreme Court. The polling was conducted using the standard first-past-the-post electoral method.

== Background ==
Mayor Ernst Peterson Hay had been appointed as a Judge of the Supreme Court of New Zealand and after joining the judiciary he resigned as mayor on 20 January 1949 triggering a by-election. Citizens' Association councillor, and deputy mayor since 1947, William Gregory was elected to replace Hay, opposed only by councillor Henry Valentine "Harry" Horlor of the Labour Party, who had contested the mayoralty once before in 1941.

== Results ==
1949 Lower Hutt mayoral by-election
Party	Candidate	Votes	%	±%
Citizens'	William Gregory	4,437	50.29	
Labour	Harry Horlor	4,345	49.26	
Informal votes		40	0.45	−0.10
Majority		92	1.04	
Turnout		8,822	38.35	−10.69

=== Results by locality ===
Following table shows the detailed ballot results by the local polling booths:

Locality	Gregory (Citizens')		Horlor (Labour)		Winner
Locality	Votes	%	Votes	%	Winner
R.S.A. Clubrooms	372	64.69	203	35.31	Gregory
Taita North School	38	25.67	110	74.33	Horlor
Taita Central	50	18.24	244	81.76	Horlor
Gordon St. Hall	139	69.84	60	30.16	Gregory
Baptist Hall	167	34.93	311	65.07	Horlor
Waddington School	30	17.76	139	82.24	Horlor
Seddon St.	100	23.48	326	76.52	Horlor
Knox Hall	491	62.62	293	37.38	Gregory
Epuni School	219	44.69	271	55.31	Horlor
Birch St. YMCA	281	58.05	203	41.95	Gregory
Waterloo School	311	53.71	268	46.29	Gregory
Horticultural Hall	1,132	66.16	579	33.84	Gregory
St Stephen's Hall	206	31.99	438	68.01	Horlor
Waiwhetu School	189	45.76	224	54.24	Horlor
Gracefield School	72	23.16	239	76.84	Horlor
Hutt Central School	463	59.13	320	40.87	Gregory
Congregational Hall	177	60.2	117	39.8	Gregory
Total	4,437	50.29	4,345	49.26	Gregory

Gregory was sworn in as mayor on 14 March at the first council meeting after the election. His first act was to nominate a successor to himself as deputy mayor. He nominated Eric Rothwell while Horlor nominated councillor Bella Logie, arguing that the role of deputy should go to a councillor of widespread appeal citing that Logie had polled third highest at the previous council election while Rothwell had polled eighth. Gregory disagreed and was disappointed that the council would not acclaim his nomination unanimously. A secret ballot was conducted by council members which resulted in a tie. Gregory used his casting vote for Rothwell.

== Council by-election ==
As Gregory was a councillor at the time of his election he had to resign his council seat upon being sworn in as mayor at the first council meeting after the election. This triggered a second by-election for one council seat. The chairman of the Citizens' Association, Charles Hain, wrote to the Hutt Labour Representation Committee with a proposal to settle together on a suitable candidate and avoid a further election. After receiving no reply after 11 days the Citizens' Association nominated former councillor Herbert Frederick Muir for the vacancy. The Labour Party nominated Wellington Education Board and Petone and Lower Hutt Gas Board member James McDonald, who had stood for the city council in 1944, as its candidate.

The following table gives the election results:

1949 Lower Hutt City Council by-election
Party	Candidate	Votes	%	±%
Labour	James McDonald	2,262	50.88	
Citizens'	Herbert Muir	2,168	48.77	−0.85
Informal votes		16	0.35	
Majority		94	2.11	
Turnout		4,446	19.33	−29.71
