= 1959 Lower Hutt mayoral election =

| ← 1956 | 17 November 1959 | 1962 → |
- Turnout: 12,182 (38.82%)
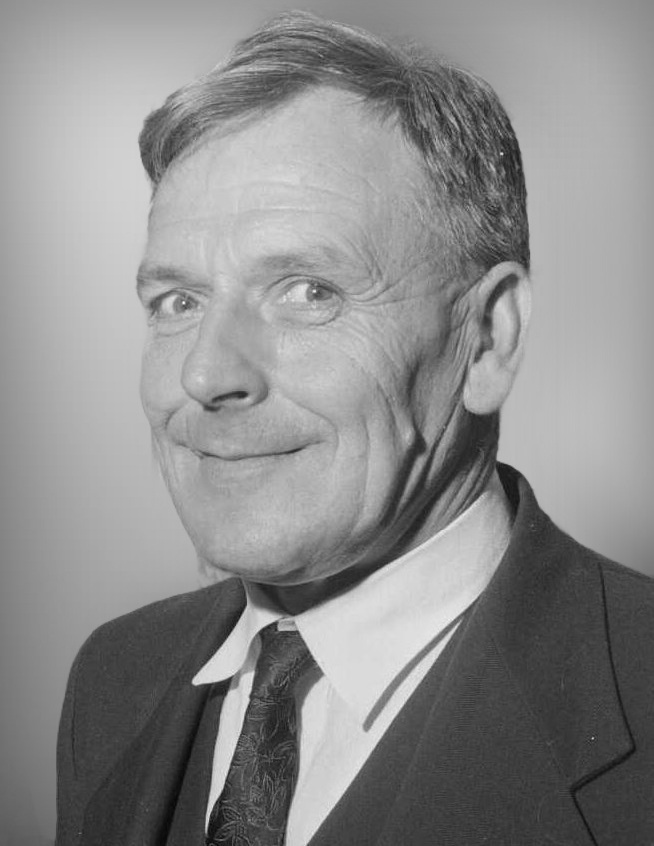

| Candidate | Percy Dowse | George Wain |
| Party | Labour | Independent |
| Popular vote | 7,372 | 4,501 |
| Percentage | 60.51 | 36.94 |
Mayor before election
Percy Dowse
Elected mayor
Percy Dowse

The 1959 Lower Hutt mayoral election was part of the New Zealand local elections held that same year. The elections were held for the role of Mayor of Lower Hutt plus other local government positions including fifteen city councillors, also elected triennially. The polling was conducted using the standard first-past-the-post electoral method.

== Background ==
The incumbent Mayor, Percy Dowse, sought re-election for a fourth term. Dowse was opposed by George Wain who stood as an independent candidate. Dowse received a swing against the majority he won in 1956 against former councillor Will Giltrap. This confounded expectations as Wain had no previous civic experience and had only lived in the area for a few years. Just as in the previous election the Citizens' Association (whose tickets won no seats at the 1950 and 1953 elections) did not stand an official ticket of candidates and endorsed a slate of 10 independents while also recommending five of the sitting Labour councillors for re-election. The Ratepayer Independents polled far better than expected with nine of its candidates being elected and only six Labour councillors were re-elected (five of whom were endorsed by the Ratepayer Independents). Sam Chesney was the only Labour councillor elected without their endorsement. The main talking point in the election was the council's finances. The Citizens' Association criticised Dowse and challenged him to resign over a NZ£75,000 loan for the second stage of the Maungaraki development. Concern over debt cut into Dowse's majority and helped the Ratepayer Independents win so many seats.

The overall anti-Labour vote (which was consistent nationwide) was attributed to the unpopularity of the then Labour government. Prime Minister Walter Nash (whose parliamentary seat encompassed Lower Hutt City) commented simply "We seem to have held the mayoralties" in reference that in Lower Hutt, Wellington and Christchurch Labour mayors were re-elected despite voters electing majority centre-right councils.

== Mayoral results ==
1959 Lower Hutt mayoral election
| Party | Candidate | Votes | % | ±% |
|---|---|---|---|---|
| Labour | Percy Dowse | 7,372 | 60.51 | −7.89 |
| Independent | George Wain | 4,501 | 36.94 | |
| Informal votes | | 309 | 2.53 | +2.26 |
| Majority | | 2,871 | 23.56 | −13.96 |
| Turnout | | 12,182 | 38.82 | −4.61 |

== Councillor results ==
1959 Lower Hutt City Council election
| Party | Candidate | Votes | % | ±% |
|---|---|---|---|---|
| Labour | Trevor Young | 8,582 | 70.44 | +0.38 |
| Labour | James McDonald | 8,425 | 69.15 | −2.15 |
| Labour | Chen Werry | 8,250 | 67.72 | +0.42 |
| Labour | Jessie Donald | 8,202 | 67.32 | −1.01 |
| Labour | Wally Bugden | 7,878 | 64.66 | −0.07 |
| Independent | George Barker | 7,439 | 61.06 | |
| Independent | Alwin Atkinson | 7,240 | 59.43 | +13.98 |
| Independent | Cyril Phelps | 6,896 | 56.60 | +13.36 |
| Independent | Isaac Richard Robinson | 6,778 | 55.63 | |
| Labour | Sam Chesney | 6,550 | 53.76 | −16.39 |
| Independent | Donald Marshall Wilson | 6,507 | 53.41 | |
| Independent | Keith Thomas | 6,415 | 52.65 | |
| Independent | Dave Hadley | 6,317 | 51.85 | |
| Independent | William Davidson Smith | 6,217 | 51.03 | |
| Independent | Ray Torrie | 6,182 | 50.74 | |
| Labour | Wally Mildenhall | 6,117 | 49.81 | −15.73 |
| Labour | Walter Fraser | 5,915 | 48.55 | |
| Independent | George Francis Oliver Thomson | 5,894 | 48.38 | |
| Labour | Alexander Murray | 5,842 | 47.95 | −16.02 |
| Labour | Bert Sutherland | 5,807 | 47.66 | −17.59 |
| Labour | William John Jarvis | 5,660 | 46.46 | |
| Labour | William Mouat McLaren | 5,652 | 46.39 | −18.93 |
| Labour | Allan Patrick Ryan | 5,219 | 42.84 | −15.95 |
| Labour | Joseph Stanislaus O'Brien | 5,014 | 41.15 | |
| Labour | William Riley | 4,902 | 40.23 | −19.62 |
