= 1956 Lower Hutt mayoral election =

1956 election in New Zealand

← 1953	17 November 1956	1959 →
- Turnout: 12,248 (43.43%)
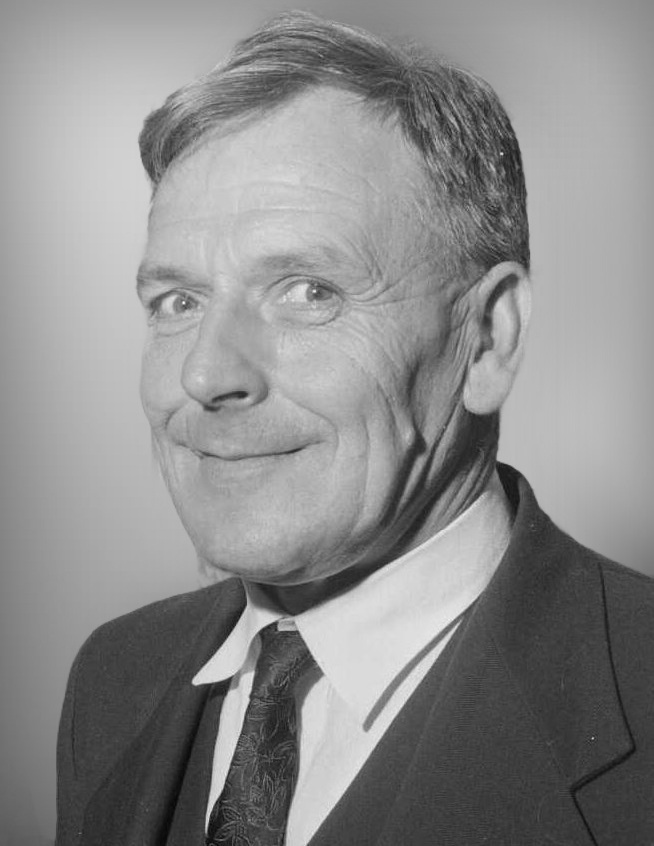

Candidate	Percy Dowse	Will Giltrap
Party	Labour	Independent
Popular vote	8,378	3,782
Percentage	68.40	30.88
Mayor before election
Percy Dowse
Elected mayor
Percy Dowse

The 1956 Lower Hutt mayoral election was part of the New Zealand local elections held that same year. The elections were held for the role of Mayor of Lower Hutt plus other local government positions including fifteen city councillors, also elected triennially. The polling was conducted using the standard first-past-the-post electoral method.

== Background ==
The incumbent Mayor, Percy Dowse, sought re-election for a third term. Dowse was opposed by William Giltrap who stood as an independent candidate. Giltrap had been a Citizens' Association councillor from 1947 to 1950 and again from 1951 to 1953. At this election the Citizens' Association (whose tickets won no seats at the 1950 and 1953 elections) did not stand an official ticket of candidates. Instead Giltrap led a group of five other candidates (known cumulatively as the "Ratepayer Independents") against the Labour council ticket.

Dowse campaigned on his record of development of the city. Labour's pledges were to build a new Town Hall and civic centre, preserve open spaces in northern suburbs (Naenae, Taita and Stokes Valley) for recreation, rebuilding the Melling bridge and improving street sealing in older suburbs of the city. The Ratepayer Independents campaigned on individual freedom and non-partisanship. Election pledges included rates reduction, incentivising land subdivision for new housing, beautification of the Hutt River stop banks and improving road access to Wainuiomata.

Labour won even more decisively than they had in the previous two elections. It won the mayoralty, a majority on the Hutt River Board along with all seats on the city council, power board, gas board, harbour board and hospital board. The only non-Labour seat was won by Giltrap who was elected to the river board.

== Mayoral results ==
1956 Lower Hutt mayoral election
Party	Candidate	Votes	%	±%
Labour	Percy Dowse	8,378	68.40	+7.56
Independent	Will Giltrap	3,782	30.88	
Informal votes		88	0.71	+0.27
Majority		4,596	37.52	+15.20
Turnout		12,248	43.43	−9.13

== Councillor results ==
1956 Lower Hutt City Council election
Party	Candidate	Votes	%	±%
Labour	James McDonald	8,733	71.30	+13.84
Labour	Sam Chesney	8,592	70.15	+11.77
Labour	Trevor Young	8,581	70.06	+12.29
Labour	John Davey	8,403	68.60	+14.60
Labour	William Harvey	8,382	68.43	
Labour	Jessie Donald	8,370	68.33	+14.87
Labour	Chen Werry	8,244	67.30	+13.59
Labour	Wally Mildenhall	8,028	65.54	
Labour	William Mouat McLaren	8,001	65.32	
Labour	Bert Sutherland	7,992	65.25	
Labour	Wally Bugden	7,929	64.73	+12.49
Labour	Alexander Murray	7,836	63.97	+10.34
Labour	William Riley	7,331	59.85	
Labour	Clarence Fennell (Note: Fennell resigned from the council in January 1959 and was replaced by Walter Fraser via an appointment.)	7,312	59.69	+10.80
Labour	Allan Patrick Ryan	7,201	58.79	
Independent	Alwin Atkinson	5,567	45.45	+7.49
Independent	Will Giltrap	5,537	45.20	+2.11
Independent	Cyril Phelps	5,297	43.24	+20.95
Independent	Randall Owen George Slacke	5,173	42.23	
Independent	Amy Irene Wilson	4,858	39.66	
Independent	Lawry Richard Donovan	4,781	39.03	

Table footnotes:
