= Alan Gilkison =

New Zealand company director (1909–1993

Sir Alan Gilkison CBE
- Born: Alan Fleming Gilkison; 4 November 1909; Invercargill, New Zealand
- Died: 13 January 1990 (aged 80); Wānaka, New Zealand
- Occupation: Company director
- Spouse: Noeline Cramond (m. 1934)
- Children: 2
- Relatives: Albert Cramond (father-in-law)
- Military career
- Allegiance: New Zealand
- Branch: New Zealand Medical Corps
- Service years: 1941–1945
- Rank: Warrant officer
- Service number: 41500
- Conflicts: World War II
- Awards: Mentioned in despatches; War Medal 1939–1945; New Zealand War Service Medal

Sir Alan Fleming Gilkison CBE (4 November 1909 – 13 January 1990) was a New Zealand company director. He was chair of the National Airways Corporation from 1967 to 1974.

== Early life and family ==
Born in Invercargill on 4 November 1909, Gilkison was the son of John and Maggie Gilkison. He was educated at Southland Boys' High School from 1923 to 1924, and completed his secondary education at Timaru Boys' High School.

During the 1930s, Gilkison was active in the Invercargill Repertory Society, as an actor and producer, and served as the society's secretary. He was also a member of the Invercargill Debating Society.

== War service ==
Before World War II, Gilkison worked for the Southland stock and station firm, J. E. Watson and Company, and as a shipping agent for the Blue Star and Port Lines. In 1941, he enlisted as a corporal in the New Zealand Medical Corps, rising to the rank of warrant officer. He served in HS Maunganui, a hospital ship, and was mentioned in despatches. He also received the War Medal 1939–1945 and the New Zealand War Service Medal.

== Post-war life and career ==
=== Marriage and family ===
On 11 March 1950, Gilkison married Noeline Cramond, the daughter of Albert Cramond, and the couple had two children.

=== Activities in Southland ===
Gilkison became a leading business figure in Southland. He was the general manager and board chair of J. E. Watson and Company, succeeded his father as chair of SFM's board of directors in February 1961, and was also chair of New Zealand's principal meat marketing firm, Towers and Company (later Towers International). He stood down as chair of Towers in 1980 and SFM in 1982.

Gilkison was a member of the Southland Harbour Board from 1949 to 1968, and served as the inaugural president of the Southland Medical Foundation.

=== Airline director and chair ===
In July 1961, when the New Zealand government acquired the Australian government's shares in Tasman Empire Airways Limited (TEAL) and the airline become wholly New Zealand owned, Gilkison was appointed to the TEAL's board of directors. In October the same year, he also joined the board of the National Airways Corporation (NAC). His appointment to the board of TEAL, alongside that of Ron Guthrey from Christchurch, was the first time that TEAL's board included members from the South Island. When TEAL was renamed Air New Zealand in 1965, Gilkison became deputy chair of the new airline's board.

Gilkison became chair of the NAC board in 1967, at which time he relinquished the deputy chairmanship of Air New Zealand while continuing to serve as a director of the latter airline. He remained as chair of NAC until resigning in October 1974. During Gilkison's tenure as chair, NAC took delivery of its first Boeing 737 in September 1968, and by September 1974 its fleet of that aircraft had increased to seven, replacing the airline's ageing Vickers Viscount turboprops on the main-trunk routes.

=== Honours and awards ===
In the 1972 New Year Honours, Gilkison was appointed a Commander of the Order of the British Empire, for services to the community. He was knighted as a Knight Bachelor, for services to aviation, export industry and the community, in the 1980 Queen's Birthday Honours.

== Later life ==
Gilkison lived in retirement in Wānaka, and was a founder of the Wānaka Music Society. He died in a house fire at his home in Wānaka on 13 January 1990. He was buried at Wānaka Cemetery. His wife, Noeline, Lady Gilkison, died in 1999.
