= Edward Stewart =

Edward Stewart may refer to:

- Edward Stewart (bishop), bishop of Orkney between c. 1503 and c. 1525
- Edward Richard Stewart (1782–1851), Scottish Whig then Liberal politician
- Edward Stewart (politician) (1808–1875), Scottish Whig then Liberal politician
- E. W. Stewart (fl. 1900), Irish trade unionist and politician
- Edward Stewart (rugby union) (1901–1979), New Zealand rugby union player
- Edward Stewart (set decorator) (1915–1999), American set decorator
- Ed Stewart (1941–2016), English broadcaster
