= New Zealand Legion =

- President: Campbell Begg
- Founded: 1932
- Dissolved: c.1938
- Split from: United–Reform Coalition
- Ideology: Social conservatism Classical liberalism
- Political position: Right-wing
- Slogan: The Legion is Yours. You are the Legion

The New Zealand Legion was a political organisation founded in New Zealand during the Great Depression. Its ideology was a mixture of nationalism, individualism, and social conservatism. It is sometimes considered to be a fascist (or at least crypto-fascist) group, although the group itself did not see itself in this light.

== History ==
The New Zealand Legion was a successor to the New Zealand National Movement, which had been founded by a group of people dissatisfied with the United-Reform coalition government, who broke away soon after 1930. The group included John Ormond, a former Independent Reform candidate influenced by Albert Davy (although Davy himself did not join the Legion).

In particular, the government was accused of adopting "socialist" policies to combat the Depression, and of attempting to appease left-wingers rather than resist them. The New Zealand Legion presented itself as an alternative solution to the Depression, winning support from conservatives who believed that action was necessary but who rejected the socialist approach.

The Legion reached its height in late 1933, when it is believed to have had around 20,000 members. Much of its support came from smaller provincial towns, particularly in the Hawkes Bay area. The Legion had little in the way of organisation, however, and rarely set out any detailed programs. By the end of 1934, the Legion had dwindled away to virtually nothing.

At the 1935 local-body elections the Legion put forward candidates for local government positions in the Hutt Valley, the first occasion it had contested an election. The Legion's mayoral candidate for Lower Hutt, the incumbent Jack Andrews, was elected unopposed and a majority of Legion candidates were elected to the council. It also had candidates elected to the Wellington Hospital Board, Hutt Valley Electric Power Board and Hutt River Board. Its candidates for the Wellington Harbour Board and Eastbourne Borough Council were all defeated however. The Legion's president, Dr Campbell Begg, said he was pleased with the results.

== Ideology ==
The New Zealand Legion used a number of themes in its campaigning. One was nationalism, with the Legion arguing for greater self-reliance (particularly from Britain) and national unity. Another was individualism — harshly critical of "state paternalism", the Legion promoted what it saw as the right of people to be free from (and if necessary, to resist) government interference in their affairs. There were also calls for greater public morality and self-sacrifice "for the sake of the country". Although the Legion was involved in politics, it did not see itself as a political party, and professed itself opposed to the party system.

Some, particularly on the left, accused the Legion of being a fascist organisation, but this is a contentious claim. In particular, the Legion's belief in individualism is pointed out as contrary to fascist principle. After the Legion's eventual demise, Campbell Begg, its one-time leader, was approached by the Nazis while on a world trip, but is reported to have found their philosophy "absurd".
