= 1972 New Year Honours (New Zealand) =

Annual awards for New Zealanders

The 1972 New Year Honours in New Zealand were appointments by Elizabeth II on the advice of the New Zealand government to various orders and honours to reward and highlight good works by New Zealanders. The awards celebrated the passing of 1971 and the beginning of 1972, and were announced on 1 January 1972.

The recipients of honours are displayed here as they were styled before their new honour.

== Knight Bachelor ==
- Bernard Thomas O'Connell – of Wellington. For outstanding services to manufacturing and commerce.

== Order of Saint Michael and Saint George ==
=== Companion (CMG) ===
- Alfred Lawrence Friis – of Tauranga. For very valuable services to the dairy industry.
- Roy Granville McElroy – of Auckland. For very valuable services to the community.
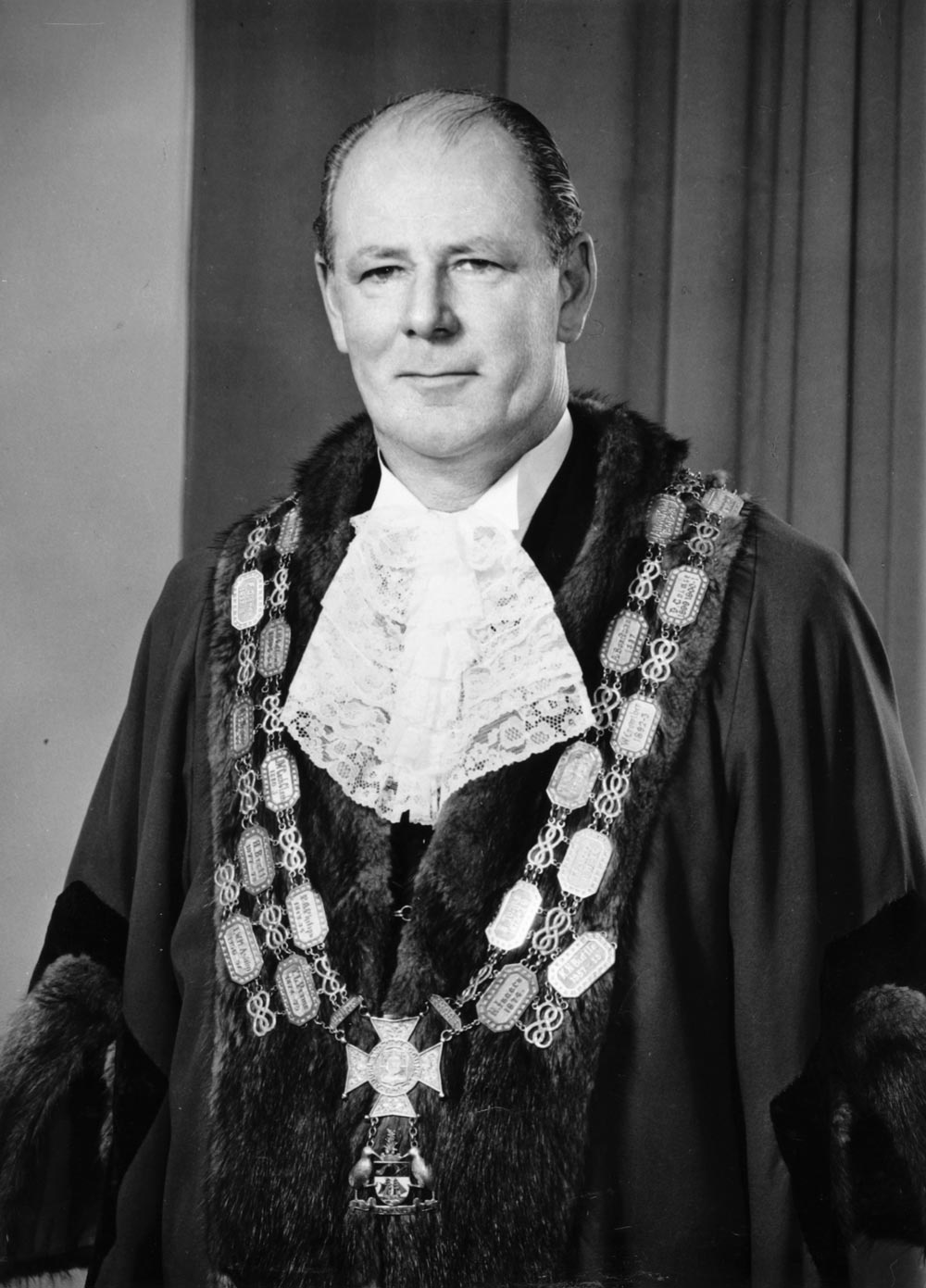
Roy McElroy

== Order of the British Empire ==
=== Knight Commander (KBE) ===
Civil division

- Thomas Harcourt Clarke Caughey OBE – of Auckland. For outstanding services to health administration.
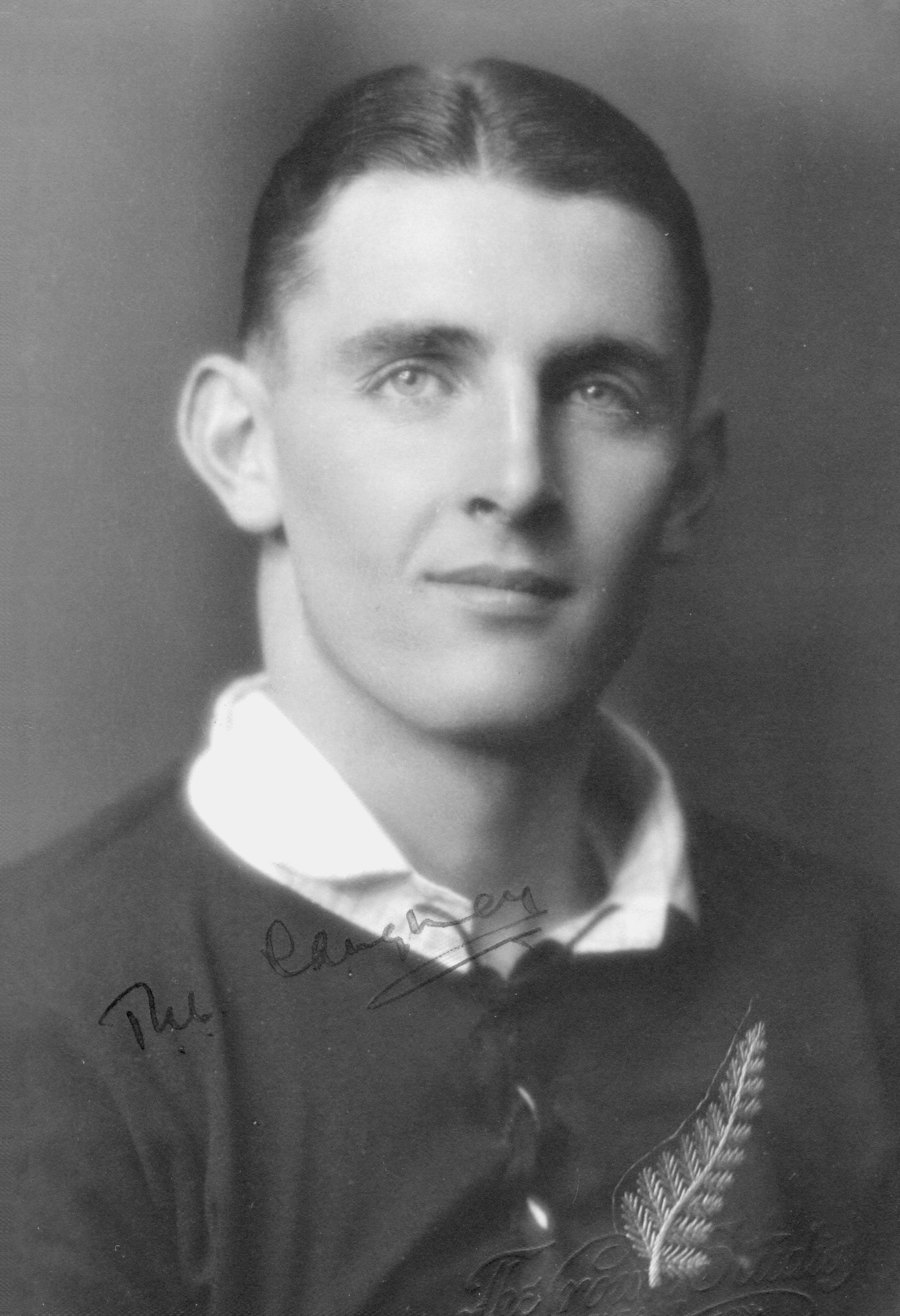
Sir Harcourt Caughey

=== Commander (CBE) ===
Civil division

- Harold Iver Austad MBE – of Wellington. For very valuable services to athletics.
- Alan Fleming Gilkison – of Invercargill. For very valuable services to the community.
- George Searle – of Wellington. For very valuable services as Director-General of the New Zealand Post Office.
- Alan Stewart – of Palmerston North. For very valuable services to education.

Military division

- Commodore Edward Courtney Thorne – Royal New Zealand Navy.
- Major-General Leslie Arthur Pearce OBE – Brigadiers' List (Regular Force).
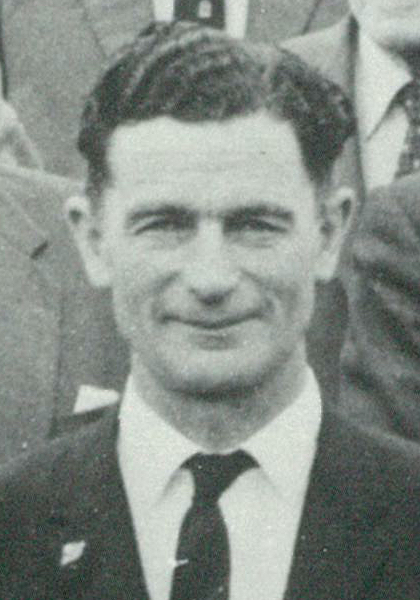
Alan Stewart

=== Officer (OBE) ===
Civil division

- Neil Colquhoun Begg MB FRCP – of Dunedin. For valuable services to the community.
- George James Brocklehurst – of Wellington. For valuable services as chairman of the Social Security Commission.
- Maurice Alister Brook – of Auckland. For valuable services, as a judge of the Māori Land Court and judge of the High Court of the Cook Islands.
- Ian Donald Arthur Cameron MBE – of Wairarapa. For valuable services to the community.
- Arnold Edwin Clark – of Eastbourne. For valuable services as chairman of the Soil Conservation and Rivers Control Council.
- Duncan Sandford Cox – of Auckland. For valuable services to tourism and the accountancy profession.
- Selwyn Osgood Field – of Geneva, Switzerland. For valuable services to youth.
- Margaret Katherine Holt – of Hawke's Bay. For valuable services to the community.
- David Fiander Horlor – of Nelson. For valuable services to education.
- Wiremu Peka Kerekere – of Wellington. For valuable services to the Māori people.
- Horace McGregor Kirk – of Auckland. For valuable services to the community.
- Malcolm Arnold Rickard – of Wellington. For valuable services to broadcasting and music.
- Margaret Grace Turnbull – of Wellington. For valuable services as chief commissioner, Girl Guides Association.
- William Leslie Francis Utley MD FRCS – of Christchurch. For valuable services to surgery.

Military division

- Surgeon Commander Malcolm Hames Watson VRD – Royal New Zealand Naval Volunteer Reserve.
- Lieutenant-Colonel Richard Ian Launder – Royal New Zealand Infantry Regiment (Regular Force).
- Wing Commander William Neil Alexander McKay – Royal New Zealand Air Force.

=== Member (MBE) ===
Civil division

- George Albert Benson – of Wanganui. For services to athletics.
- Hugh Morrish Besley – of Taupō. For services to local government.
- Eileen Brown – of New Plymouth. For services to the community.
- Denver Harold Calder MB ChB – of Hamilton. For services to the community.
- Ronald James Doherty – of Woodville. For services to the trade union movement.
- Leslie Ernest Farr – of Rangiora. For services to local government.
- Charles Edmund Forsyth – of West Otago. For services to the community.
- Matthew Green – of Feilding. For services to local government.
- George Davidson Griffiths – of Christchurch. For services to the community.
- Ethel Winifred Jessie Harwood – of Rotorua. For services to education.
- Muir James McGlashen – of Richmond. For services to local government.
- John Alexander McNeish – of Brunner. For services to the community.
- Moya Clare McTamney – of Masterton. For services as a nurse in South Vietnam.
- Henry Francis Miller – of Russell. For services to local government
- Alfred Benjamin Muggeridge – of South Taranaki. For services to the community.
- John Joseph Nimon – of Havelock North. For services to the community.
- Alfred Clarence Paine – of Invercargill. For services to the community.
- Richard Charles Parker – of Gisborne. For services to local government.
- Harry Leonard Riley – of Golden Bay. For services to local government.
- Herbert Donald Robertson VD MB ChB – of Wanganui. For services to the community.
- The Reverend Ewing Campbell Stevens – of Dunedin. For services as a minister of religion.
- Henry Charles-Tod MB ChB – of Cambridge. For services to the community.
- Ernest Cecil Wright – of Canterbury. For services to the community.

Military division

- Lieutenant Commander Francis Edward John Mason – Royal New Zealand Navy.
- Stores Warrant Officer Noel Lindsay Walker – Royal New Zealand Navy.
- Major Andrew Lawrence Fleming ED – Royal New Zealand Infantry Regiment (Territorial Force).
- Major (Temporary Lieutenant-Colonel) Peter Gibson Hotop – Royal New Zealand Infantry Regiment (Regular Force).
- Captain (Temporary Major) Eruini Taharua Te Moananui ED – Royal New Zealand Armoured Corps (Territorial Force).
- Squadron Officer Beverley Ethne Bowler – Women's Royal New Zealand Air Force.
- Warrant Officer Thomas Methven – Royal New Zealand Air Force.

== Companion of the Imperial Service Order (ISO) ==
- Joseph Langmuir Hunter – of Wellington. For valuable services as Assistant Director-General of Education.

== British Empire Medal (BEM) ==
Civil division

- Olive Mary Barker – of Timaru. For services to the community.
- Edward Francis Bradley – of Auckland. For services to education.
- Clifford Bruce Collins – of Nelson; mechanical overseer, Ministry of Works.
- Gordon Harold Cowles – of Christchurch. For services to the community.
- Florence Laurel Craig – of Auckland. For services to education.
- Francis Patrick Mahony – of Napier. For services as a mail contractor.
- Elsie Constance Odell – of Riverton. For services to the community.
- Cyril Walter Partridge – of Te Puke. For services to the community.
- Jessie May Quarrie – of Helensville. For services as matron of Helensville Obstetric Hospital.
- Peter Robson – of Mana. For services to the community.
- Dorothy Jenner Wales – of Christchurch. for services to the community.
- Leonard Ryan Williams – of Alexandra. For services to the community.

Military division

- Chief Engineering Mechanic Noel Rapana Flesher – Royal New Zealand Navy.
- Chief Radio Electrical Artificer Edward Arthur Postance – Royal New Zealand Navy.
- Chief Radio Mechanic Albert Alexander Tiriana – Royal New Zealand Navy.
- Sergeant Garry Belchamber – Royal New Zealand Army Medical Corps (Territorial Force).
- Corporal (Temporary Sergeant) Michael Roger Arthur Carter – Royal New Zealand Electrical and Mechanical Engineers (Regular Force).
- Staff Sergeant Herbert Desmond Smith – Royal New Zealand Infantry Regiment (Territorial Force).
- Staff Sergeant Thelma Audrey Wigley – Royal New Zealand Nursing Corps (Regular Force).
- Sergeant Gerald William Gaston – Royal New Zealand Air Force.

== Air Force Cross (AFC) ==
- Squadron Leader Trevor Thomas Bland – Royal New Zealand Air Force.

== Queen's Police Medal (QPM) ==
- Burton Bernard Bevege – Detective Superintendent, New Zealand Police Force.
- Joseph William Saunders – Chief Superintendent, New Zealand Police Force.

== Queen's Fire Service Medal (QFSM) ==
- Robert Allan Davidson – chief fire officer, Timaru Fire Brigade.
- Lumsden-Vickers Trass – chief fire officer, Levin Fire Brigade.

== Queen's Commendation for Valuable Service in the Air ==
- Master Air Electronics Operator Barry James Hogg – Royal New Zealand Air Force.
