= 1933 Lower Hutt mayoral election =

- 3 May 1933
- Turnout: 3,290 (49.40%)
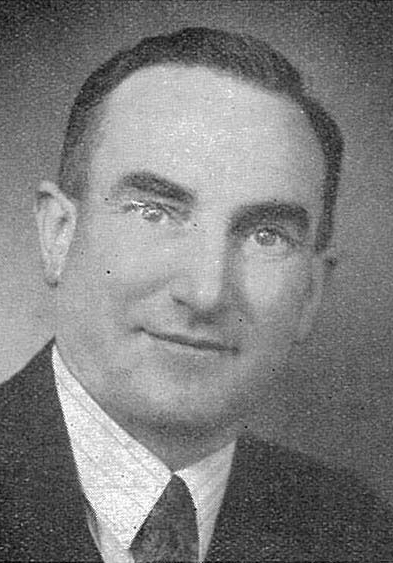

Candidate	Jack Andrews	Alexander McBain
Party	Independent	Citizens'
Popular vote	2,001	876
Percentage	60.82	26.62
Mayor before election
Will Strand
Elected mayor
Jack Andrews

The 1933 Lower Hutt mayoral election was part of the New Zealand local elections held that same year. The elections were held for the role of Mayor of Lower Hutt plus other local government positions including the nine borough councillors, also elected biennially. The polling was conducted using the standard first-past-the-post electoral method.

== Background ==
The incumbent mayor, Will Strand, declined to seek re-election. Four candidates put themselves forward for the mayoralty. Local businessman, and former Masterton Borough Councillor, Jack Andrews defeated Alexander McBain, a member of the Lower Hutt Borough Council since 1921, to win the mayoralty. Two other candidates campaigned on behalf of the unemployed but polled far less than Andrews and McBain.

== Mayoral results ==
1933 Lower Hutt mayoral election
Party	Candidate	Votes	%	±%
Independent	Jack Andrews	2,001	60.82	
Citizens'	Alexander McBain	876	26.62	
Worker's Party	John Barker Young	277	8.41	
Independent Labour	Alfred Avery	95	2.88	
Informal votes		41	1.24	
Majority		1,125	34.19	
Turnout		3,290	49.40	

== Councillor results ==
1933 Lower Hutt Borough Council election
Party	Candidate	Votes	%	±%
Citizens'	Alex Anderson	2,206	67.05	−3.70
Citizens'	Frank Campbell	2,040	62.00	−7.61
Citizens'	Archibald Grierson	1,964	59.69	−12.03
Citizens'	Barton Ginger	1,928	58.60	−4.99
Citizens'	Walter George Meldrum	1,851	56.26	−1.47
Citizens'	William Henry Wilson	1,721	52.31	−5.21
Independent	Charles James Ashton	1,673	50.85	
Citizens'	James Eric Napier	1,634	49.66	+0.78
Citizens'	John Mitchell	1,550	47.11	−11.04
Independent	Richard James Joseph Burke	1,460	44.37	
Independent	Albert Jackson	1,260	38.29	−1.78
Citizens'	Frank Malcolm Thessman	1,242	37.75	
Independent	Ward Pearce	1,188	36.10	
Independent	Adam Marshall Laird	713	21.67	
Worker's Party	Charles Edmund Ratliff	598	18.17	
Communist	George Watt	581	17.65	
Communist	William Ullrich	420	12.76	
