= Neil Purvis =

NZ international rugby union player

- Born: Neil Alexander Purvis; 31 January 1953 Cromwell, New Zealand
- Died: 26 October 2008 (aged 55) Tarras, New Zealand
- Height: 1.80 m (5 ft 11 in)
- Weight: 83 kg (183 lb)
- School: John McGlashan College

Rugby union career
- Position(s): Wing, second five-eighth
Provincial / State sides
Years	Team	Apps	(Points)
1971–72	Wairarapa Bush	24	
1973–81	Otago	56	
International career
Years	Team	Apps	(Points)
1976	New Zealand	1	(0)

Neil Alexander Purvis (31 January 1953 – 26 October 2008) was a New Zealand rugby union player. A second five-eighth and wing, Purvis represented Wairarapa Bush and Otago at a provincial level, and was a member of the New Zealand national side, the All Blacks, in 1976. He played 12 matches for the All Blacks including one international.

Purvis was also a noted breeder and owner of thoroughbred racehorses, his horse Cluden Creek winning the 2004 Wellington Cup. He farmed Cluden Station near Tarras in Central Otago, and died there in 2008 while attempting to rescue cattle from a bog.
