= Albert Cramond =

New Zealand cricketer

Personal information
- Full name: Albert Alexander Cramond
- Born: 12 December 1881; Dunedin, Otago, New Zealand
- Died: 21 June 1954 (aged 72); Wellington, New Zealand
- Relatives: Alan Gilkison (son-in-law)

Domestic team information
- Years: Team
- 1904/05: Otago
- Source: ESPNcricinfo, 7 May 2016

Albert Alexander Cramond (12 December 1881 – 21 June 1954) was a New Zealand cricketer. He played one first-class match for Otago in the 1904–05 season.

Cramond was born at Dunedin in 1881. He worked for Sargood, Son & Ewen for over 50 years, including as the firm's manager in Invercargill before being transferred to Wellington in 1924 where he was the firm's warehouse manager until 1951. He was an active member of the Wellington Rotary Club, serving as its president in 1942, and was involved with the boy scout movement in the city. His wife Elizabeth died in 1944; the couple had four children, a son and three daughters. One of his daughters, Noeline, married Alan Gilkison.

A keen sportsman, Cramond's sole first-class match was against a touring Australian side in a match at Carisbrook in Dunedin. He scored a total of 11 runs, nine in his first innings and two in his second as Otago lost by an innings. As well as cricket, Cramond played rugby union and competed in athletic meetings as a young man. He was a keen golfer and was captain of Invercargill Golf Club before his departure for Wellington.

Cramond died at Wellington in 1954 aged 72.
