= Alan Stewart (educator) =

New Zealand educator and university administrator

Sir Alan Stewart KBE
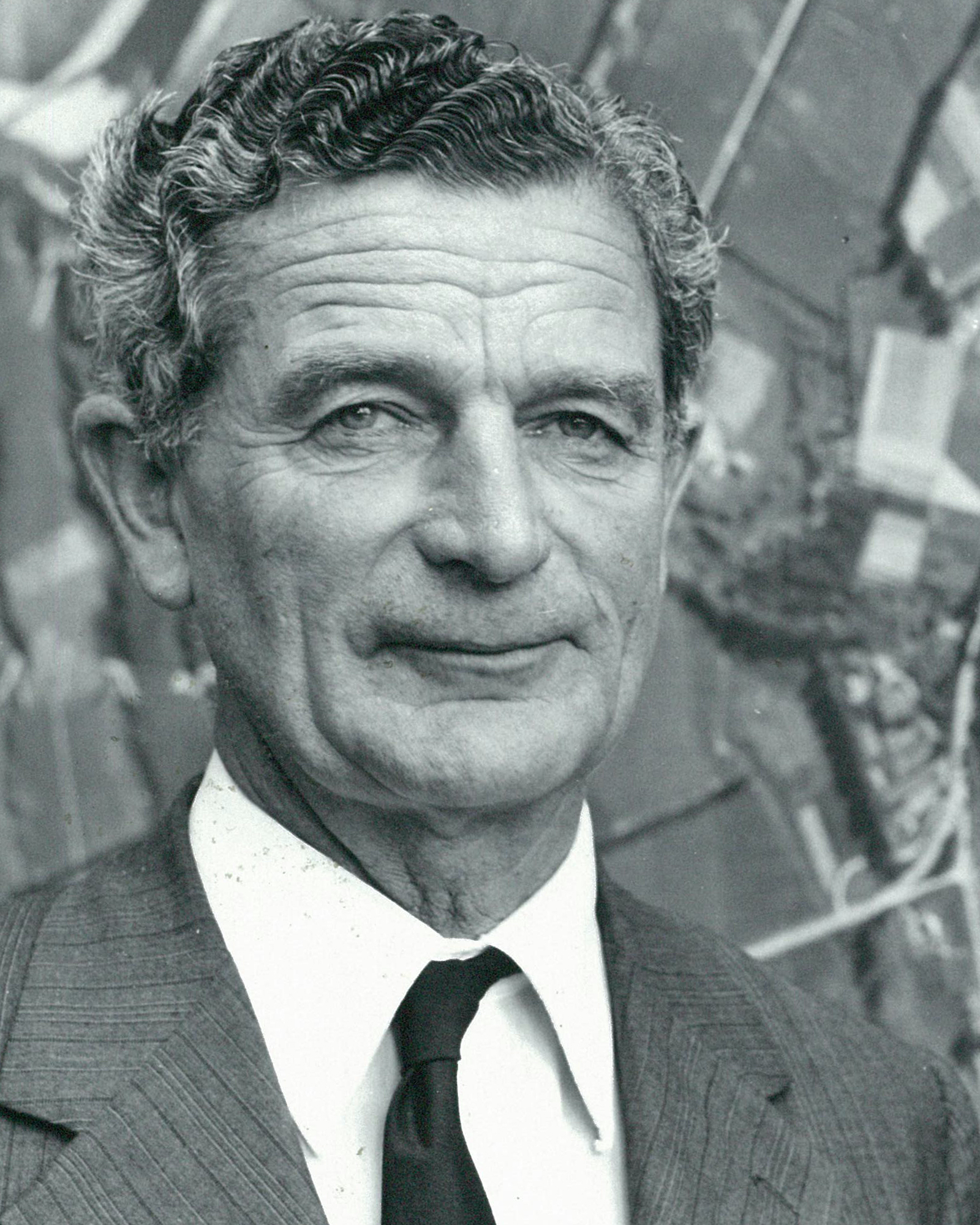
- Stewart in 1976

1st Vice-Chancellor of Massey University
- In office 1 January 1964 – 31 January 1983
- Preceded by: Office established
- Succeeded by: Neil Waters

Personal details
- Born: 8 December 1917 Auckland, New Zealand
- Died: 1 September 2004 (aged 86) Whakatāne, New Zealand
- Spouse: Joan Sisam
- Education: Auckland University College; Massey Agricultural College (BSc, MSc); University of Oxford (DPhil)

Sir Alan Stewart KBE (8 December 1917 – 1 September 2004) was a New Zealand educator and university administrator. He was principal of Massey Agricultural College from 1959 to 1963 and founding vice-chancellor of Massey University from 1964 to 1983, during which time he guided the institution's transition from agricultural college to full university. He is noted for building the university's internationally recognised agricultural programme, as well as for greatly expanding the university's extramural programme to make tertiary education available to rural New Zealanders. He was knighted in 1981 for services to education.

== Biography ==
=== Early life ===
Alan Stewart was born on 8 December 1917 in Auckland. He attended primary school in Auckland and Whakatāne, and then his first years of high school at Whakatane District High School, where he was awarded a junior national scholarship. In 1934, he transferred to Mount Albert Grammar School in Auckland. Stewart excelled in sport at school, serving as captain of the swimming team and also taking part in boxing and athletics.

In 1936, Stewart began taking lectures at Auckland University College while playing rugby for the Auckland junior representative rugby team. In 1937, he began lectures at Massey Agricultural College in Palmerston North where he was awarded the Lord Bledisloe Prize and the 1940 senior scholarship in agriculture for his academic achievements, and where he earned his Bachelor of Agricultural Science in 1939 and Master of Agricultural Science in 1940. While at Massey, he served as captain of both the college rugby team and the Manawatu rugby team and was a member of the North Island Universities' rugby team. He was nominated for the All Black trials in 1939. Stewart also held several college championships in tennis, swimming, sprinting and hurdles.

=== World War II and England ===
In 1940, Stewart was awarded Massey's second Rhodes Scholarship; however, his studies were interrupted by the outbreak of World War II and Stewart served in the Royal Navy for the duration of the war. After the war, he began working as an assistant lecturer at Massey Agricultural College. In 1946, Stewart was finally able to fulfil his Rhodes Scholarship and moved to England to attend the University of Oxford, where he was an Oxford Blue in rugby, played for the combined Oxford-Cambridge rugby team in the 1948 tour of Argentina, and was selected for the Scotland national rugby team, although a knee injury ended his rugby-playing career. After completing his DPhil at Oxford in 1949, Stewart returned to Massey as a senior lecturer in animal husbandry in 1950, marrying Joan Sisam the same year. Realising that he would need overseas experience in order to play a more significant role at Massey, Stewart returned to England in 1954 to serve as the Chief Consulting Officer of the Milk Marketing Board of England and Wales until 1958.

=== Massey vice-chancellorship ===
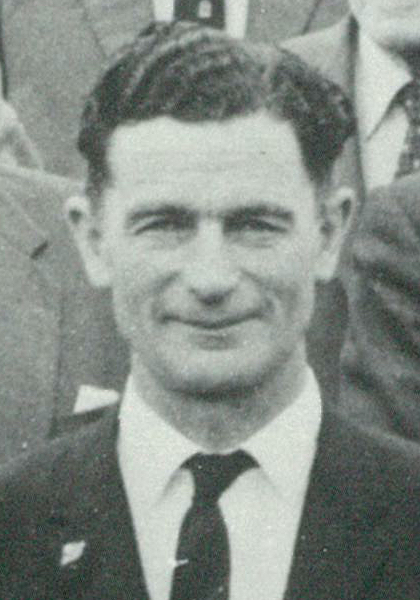
Alan Stewart in 1962

Returning to New Zealand again in 1959, Stewart was appointed principal of Massey Agricultural College at a time when the college's enrolment stood at just 578 students. In 1964, Massey was made an independent university and Stewart was appointed its first vice-chancellor. During his tenure, Stewart oversaw the expansion of the university, especially that of its extramural programme, which he saw as a means for the university to improve the economic welfare of all New Zealanders, no matter their location. Massey University soon earned international recognition for its agricultural programme due in part to what one New Zealand cabinet minister deemed Stewart's "extraordinary contributions". Numerous academic buildings were constructed during Stewart's tenure, and his love of fine trees contributed to the lush landscape of the university. Stewart also served as president of the Manawatu Rugby Union.

=== Knighthood and retirement ===
Stewart was appointed a Commander of the Order of the British Empire in the 1972 New Year Honours and promoted to Knight Commander of the Order of the British Empire in the 1981 Queen's Birthday Honours, for services to education, before retiring from the university in 1983. At the time of his retirement, Massey University had an annual budget of $30 million, operated 500 hectares of farmland, and enrolled thousands of students. In May 1984, Massey University awarded him an honorary doctorate. Following his retirement from the university, Stewart relocated from Palmerston North to Whakatāne.

=== Death ===
Stewart died on 1 September 2004 in Whakatāne. He was survived by his wife, Joan, four children, and 12 grandchildren. Massey University's Sir Alan Stewart Postgraduate Scholarship is named in his honour.
