= John McGlashan College =

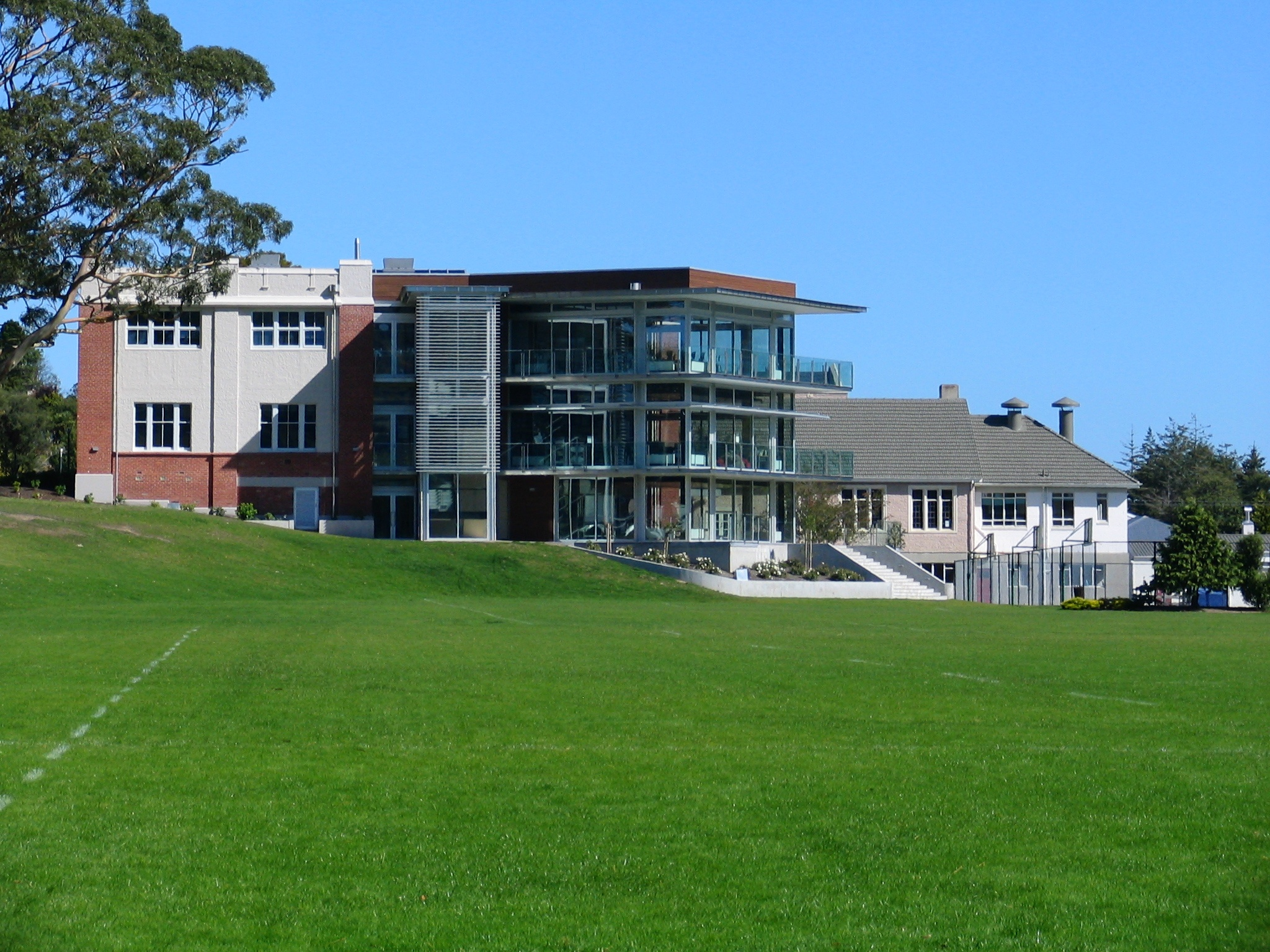
- College buildings in 2009

Location
- 2 Pilkington Street; Maori Hill, Dunedin, 9010; New Zealand; 45.8556°S 170.4980°E

Information
- Type: State integrated, boys, secondary (years 7–13) with boarding facilities
- Motto: Latin: Lex Domini Lux Mundi (The word of the Lord is the light of the World)
- Established: 1918; 108 years ago
- Ministry of Education Institution no.: 387
- Principal: Dr Aaron Columbus
- Enrolment: 527 (July 2026)
- Houses: Balmacewen; Burns; Gilray; Ross
- Colours: Navy blue, gold, red & white
- Nickname: Johnnies
- Socio-economic decile: 10Z
- Website: www.mcglashan.school.nz

John McGlashan College is a state integrated boarding and day school for boys, located in the suburb of Maori Hill in Dunedin, New Zealand. The school currently caters for 527 students from years 7 to 13, including 120 boarders and up to 30 international students.

The school is named after John McGlashan, a significant Presbyterian lawyer, politician, public servant and educationalist, and was founded after his daughters' gift of the family home and estate in 1918 on the provision that a Presbyterian school was established for boys. Originally established as a Presbyterian private school, John McGlashan College integrated into the state system in 1989.

== Enrolment ==
As a state-integrated school, John McGlashan College charges New Zealand-resident students compulsory attendance dues plus requests voluntary donations. For the 2025 school year, the attendance dues payable is NZ$1,430 per year while the requested donation is NZ$2,160 per year.

As of July 2026, the school has roll of 527 students, of which 56 (10.6%) identify as Māori.

As of 2026, the school has an Equity Index of 390, placing it amongst schools whose students have fewest socioeconomic barriers to achievement (roughly equivalent to deciles 9 and 10 under the former socio-economic decile system).

== Boarding ==
John McGlashan College has two halls for boarding. Junior Hall (Ross House) is where the common room and bedrooms for year nine and ten boarders. Some housemasters also stay in Junior Hall. The newer Senior Hall (Balmacewen House) is where common rooms and bedrooms are for year 11, 12 and 13 boarders.

== International Baccalaureate ==
John McGlashan College has been an IB World School since December 1999. It is the only school in Dunedin that offers the IB Diploma Programme.

In 2011, 4 female students studied at the college full-time. Their original school, private Anglican girls' school, St Margaret's College, had been damaged in the 2011 Christchurch earthquake. While being officially enrolled at nearby state integrated Anglican girls' school St Hilda's Collegiate School, the girls took classes at McGlashan as it was the only other IB school in the South Island.

== International Exchanges ==
John McGlashan College has a relationship with Ichikawa Gakuen, a large private school near Tokyo, Japan. The German Exchange is a nationwide exchange and is also supported by the college through its German programme.

== Sports ==
There is a wide range of sports available at the College, including rugby, soccer, cricket, tennis, hockey, softball, volleyball, basketball, trap shooting, yachting, skiing, badminton, and golf. The College is located next to the Balmacewen Golf Course, and the college encourages their students to join the golf club.

In 2013 the College's 1st XV played against the Whitgift School for its 150th anniversary.

== Fete ==
The John McGlashan College Parents and Friends Association host an annual fete to raise money, it had a 2-year hiatus in 2020 and 2021 due to the COVID-19 lockdown.

== Houses ==
Every student upon arrival at the John McGlashan College is assigned to one of the four school houses. The houses compete in annually for the Elvidge Cup and the Minors Cup. The four Elvidge cup competitions are in the college athletics in term one, cross country in term two, the Haka competition in term three, and the college swimming sports in term four; all are compulsory for students to participate in. The interhouse Minors competition consists of golf, tennis, rugby sevens, Twenty20 cricket, soccer, hockey, table tennis, badminton, and volleyball. The houses are:

- Balmacewen (Red) – Named for Isabella MacEwen, John McGlashan's wife.
- Burns (Gold) – Named for Thomas Burns, an early settler and presbyterian minister
- Ross (Blue) – Named for Lady Ross, an early benefactor to the college
- Gilray (White) – Named for Colin Gilray, the longest serving principal of the college. The only non-original house of John McGlashan College.

== Principals ==
	Name	Term
1	Arthur Gordon Butchers	1918–1922
2	Colin Macdonald Gilray	1922–1934
3	Robert George Colin McNab	1934–1943
–	Albert William Harvey West	1940–1941 (acting)
–	Thomas Slater Holme	1942–1944 (acting)
4	Jack Conolly	1945–1950
5	I. Garden	1950–1966
6	R. Hunt	1966–1971
7	W. Keay	1971–1977
8	Allan Paulin	1978–1995
9	Michael Corkery	1995–2013
10	Neil Garry	2014–2024
–	John Veitch	2025-2025 (acting)
11	Dr Aaron Columbus	2025–present

== Notable alumni ==
- Charles Begg – radiologist and historian
- Neil Begg – paediatrician, historian, and cricketer
- George Bell – rugby union player, Crusaders (present)
- John Davies – businessman and mayor
- Tony Dodds – triathlete
- Eion Edgar – businessman and philanthropist
- Ron Elvidge – rugby union player, All Black (1946–50)
- Andrew Hore – rugby union player, All Black (2002–13)
- Hugo Inglis – field hockey player
- Clarke Johnstone – equestrian
- Jevon McSkimming - former New Zealand police deputy commissioner
- James Mustapic – comedian
- Neil Purvis – rugby union player, All Black (1976)
- Michael Rae – cricketer
- Murray Rose – politician
- Dougal Stevenson – broadcaster
- Edward Stewart – rugby union player, All Black (1923)
- Hamish Walker – politician

== See also ==
- List of schools in New Zealand
