= HS Maunganui =

Royal New Zealand Navy hospital ship

History

New Zealand
- Name: Maunganui

General characteristics
- Type: Hospital ship
- Displacement: 11,340 tons
- Length: 430 ft (130 m)
- Speed: 15–16 knots (28–30 km/h; 17–18 mph)
- Capacity: 390 patients

The HS Maunganui was a hospital ship that served in the Royal New Zealand Navy (RNZN) during World War II. Maunganui was converted from a 30-year-old oil burner, and was larger than the previous ships operated by the RNZN, those being the Maheno and Marama. She had electric lifts installed which could carry two stretchers each from deck to deck and a fresh water tank holding up to 700 tons of water. Also installed were an operating block containing rooms for sterilization, massage, X-ray and diathermy. Initially planned to have accommodation for 390 patients with 100 swinging cots, 100 single fixed cots and 95 fixed two-tier cots she ultimately ended up with 365 cots, 22 for fractures, 84 single cots and the rest two-tier cots. In total these conversions cost the New Zealand government around £50,000. By 21 April 1941, the conversions had been completed.

Once completed she had a crew of 104 medical officers, nurses and orderlies and an indeterminate amount of crew. She set sail for Suez a day after finishing conversions, leaving on 22 April 1941 to assist 2 NZEF. She arrived at Suez on 22 May 1941 taking casualties from Greece and Crete before returning to New Zealand on 10 June 1941 full with patients. This was a voyage she completed a total of 14 times.

On her 15th voyage, the ship was diverted to the Pacific to assist around various islands making repeated voyages to pick up and treat patients until the end of the war when she brought back one final load of 2 NZEF casualties from Italy and Egypt. By the end of the war the total number of patients she had taken on numbered 5,677.
