= Edward Stewart (rugby union) =

- Born: Edward Barrie Stewart; 29 October 1901 Milton, New Zealand
- Died: 12 December 1979 (aged 78) Timaru, New Zealand
- Height: 1.80 m (5 ft 11 in)
- Weight: 72 kg (159 lb)
- School: John McGlashan College; Tokomairiro High School

Rugby union career
- Position: Wing three-quarter
Provincial / State sides
Years	Team	Apps	(Points)
1921–23, 1927	Otago		
1926	Southland		
International career
Years	Team	Apps	(Points)
1923	New Zealand	0	(0)

Edward Barrie Stewart (29 October 1901 – 13 December 1979) was a New Zealand rugby union player. He was educated at Tokomairiro District High School and then John McGlashan College where he was a member of the 1st XV between 1919 and 1921. A Wing three-quarter, Stewart represented Otago andSouthland at a provincial level. He played one match for the New Zealand national side, the All Blacks, in the final match against the touring New South Wales team in 1923, scoring two tries in the 38–11 win. Stewart did not appear in any internationals.

He died in Timaru on 13 December 1979, and was buried at Timaru Cemetery.
