= Charles Mackie Begg =

New Zealand physician, surgeon

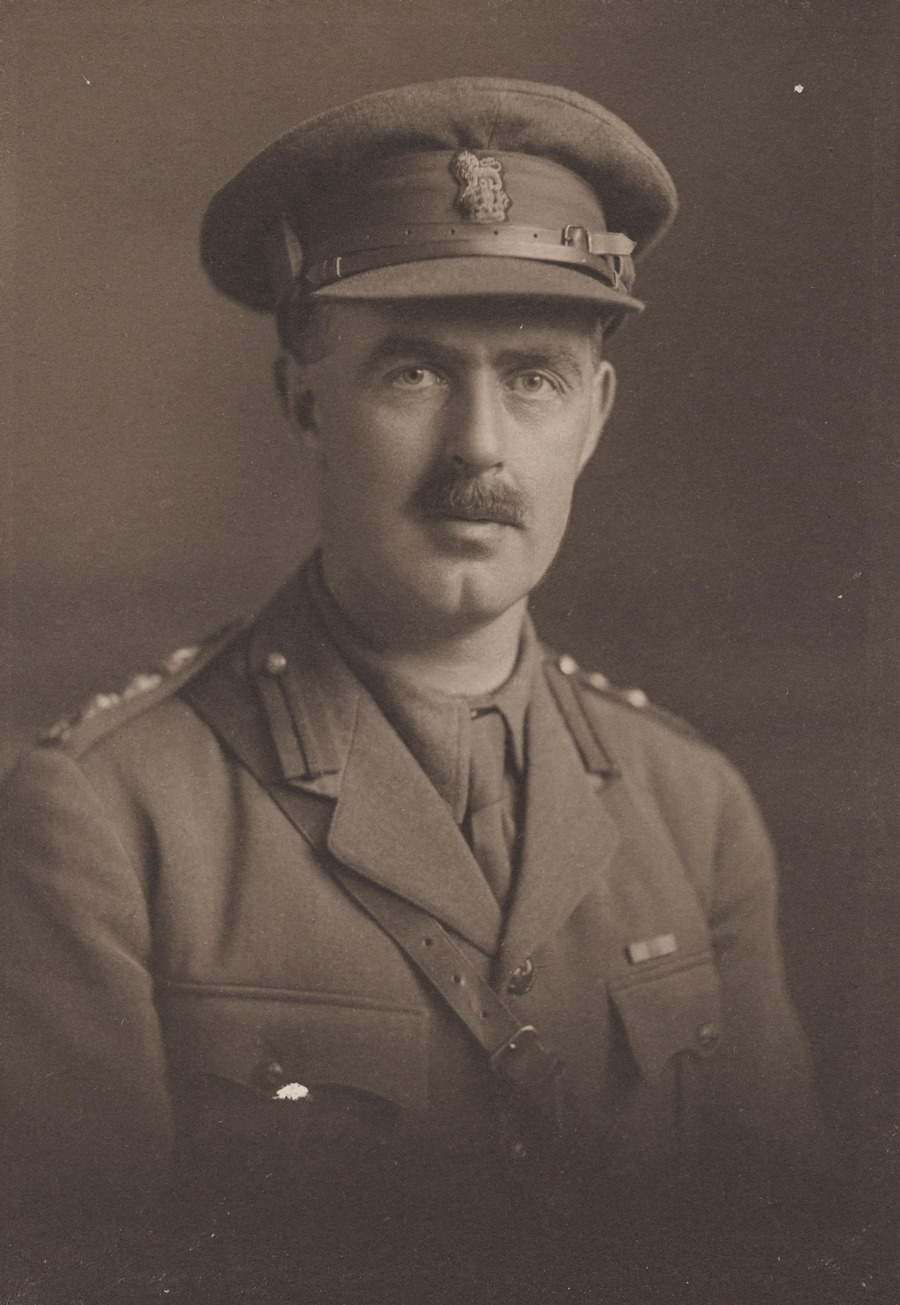
- Studio portrait of Colonel Charles Begg
- Born: 13 September 1879; Dunedin, New Zealand
- Died: 2 February 1919 (aged 39); Twickenham, London, England
- Military career
- Allegiance: New Zealand
- Branch: New Zealand Military Forces
- Service years: 1906–1919
- Conflicts: First World War; Gallipoli Campaign; Western Front
- Awards: Companion of the Order of the Bath; Companion of the Order of St Michael and St George; Mentioned in Despatches (3); Croix de Guerre (France)

Charles Mackie Begg CB CMG (13 September 1879 – 2 February 1919) was a New Zealand medical doctor and surgeon who served in the First World War as a medical administrator with the New Zealand Expeditionary Force.

== Early life ==
Born in Dunedin, New Zealand, on 13 September 1879, Charles Begg was one of nine children of an accountant and his wife. He went to Kaikorai School and then Otago Boys' High School. In 1898, he began medical school at the University of Otago before going onto University of Edinburgh, in Scotland, from which he graduated with a Bachelor of Medicine & Bachelor of Surgery in 1903. Two years later he earned a Doctor of Medicine degree.

In 1906, Begg returned to New Zealand. Now a Fellow of the Royal College of Surgeons of England, he took up residence in Wellington and joined a medical practice there. Later that year he enlisted in the New Zealand militia, known as the Volunteer Force, and was commissioned as a surgeon captain in the New Zealand Medical Corps. By 1909, he was commander of No. 5 Field Ambulance.

As well as his medical practice, Begg was working at the Wellington District Hospital as honorary surgeon to the children's ward. Within three years of his return to New Zealand, Begg had married. With his wife Lillian Helen Lawrance Treadwell, he had two children, one of whom was paediatrician and cricketer Neil Begg.

== First World War ==
Following the outbreak of the First World War in August 1914, the New Zealand government authorised the raising of the New Zealand Expeditionary Force (NZEF) for military service aboard. Begg volunteered for the NZEF and when its main body, which consisted of a infantry brigade and a mounted rifles brigade, departed for the Middle East on 16 October, he was the commander of its Field Ambulance. Arriving in Egypt in early December, his command underwent training and saw brief service against the Turks at Ismâ'ilîya in February 1915.

=== Gallipoli ===
The two New Zealand brigades of the NZEF joined two Australian brigades to form the New Zealand and Australian Division, which was to see service in the Gallipoli Campaign. During the landing at Anzac Cove on 25 April, Begg was involved in surgical work on casualties evacuated to hospital ships. The ships became overwhelmed with patients and on 28 April Begg landed at Gallipoli and set up a dressing station on the beach which became operational the next day. It remained in service for several weeks until it was struck by Turkish shelling during which Begg was wounded. Concussed and with an injured knee, he was admitted to the New Zealand Field Ambulance Hospital for a week before returning to duty. His station, relocated closer to Walker's Ridge, would end up treating over 15,000 wounded soldiers.

During the Battle of Sari Bair of August 1915, during which the New Zealanders attacked Chunuk Bair, the assistant director of medical services of the New Zealand and Australian Division, Colonel Neville Manders, was wounded and Begg took over his duties. He immediately set about dealing with the backlog of wounded soldiers that had accumulated at the beach. Shortly after completing this task, he became ill with gastro enteritis. Initially evacuated to Malta, he was sent to England for further treatment. He returned to Gallipoli on 12 November and was made the acting director of medical services. Promoted to temporary colonel, he helped with the organisation of the evacuation of Allied forces from Gallipoli the following month. His services at Gallipoli were recognised with a mention in despatches and he was made a Companion of the Order of St. Michael and St. George.

=== Western Front ===
After the campaign in Gallipoli had ended, the Australian and New Zealand Division was disbanded. The original New Zealand infantry brigade, along with two others recently arrived from New Zealand, formed the New Zealand Division. Assembled in Egypt before being transported to the Western Front in France, Begg was the division's assistant director of medical services. He worked to improve the care of the division's personnel, including the delivery of dental services in the field, and their overall health improved. In October 1916, Begg became the deputy director of medical services (DDMS) of II ANZAC Corps, which was commanded by Lieutenant General Alexander Godley, and included the New Zealand Division. His rank of colonel was also made substantive.

Among his initiatives was the establishment of a corps-level training school for its medical officers, a facility soon copied across the British Expeditionary Force. His efforts were rewarded with a mention in despatches in November 1916. His work also included preparing at corps level for offensives, one being the Battle of Messines in June 1917, which was a success. However, after the failure of the Battle of Passchendaele in October 1917, Begg wrote a detailed report on the II ANZAC Corps arrangements for evacuation and care of wounded and how these could be improved for future operations. In 1916 he was made a fellow of the Royal College of Physicians of Edinburgh. He received another mention in despatches in November 1917.

In December 1917, Godley's corps was redesignated XXII Corps but Begg remained its DDMS even after the transfer of the New Zealand Division from the corps. He also took responsibility for the treatment of French troops of the French 5th Army for which he was later awarded the Croix de Guerre. Begg was appointed a Companion of the Order of the Bath on 1 January 1918 and attained the senior medical position in the NZEF in December 1918 when he was appointed its director of medical services. Now based in London, he was only eight weeks into his tenure before becoming ill with acute pneumonia. He died at Twickenham on 2 February 1918 and was buried in Walton-on-Thames. He was survived by his wife and two children, who had joined him in England before his death.
