= Percy Dowse =

New Zealand politician

Percy Dowse CBE JP
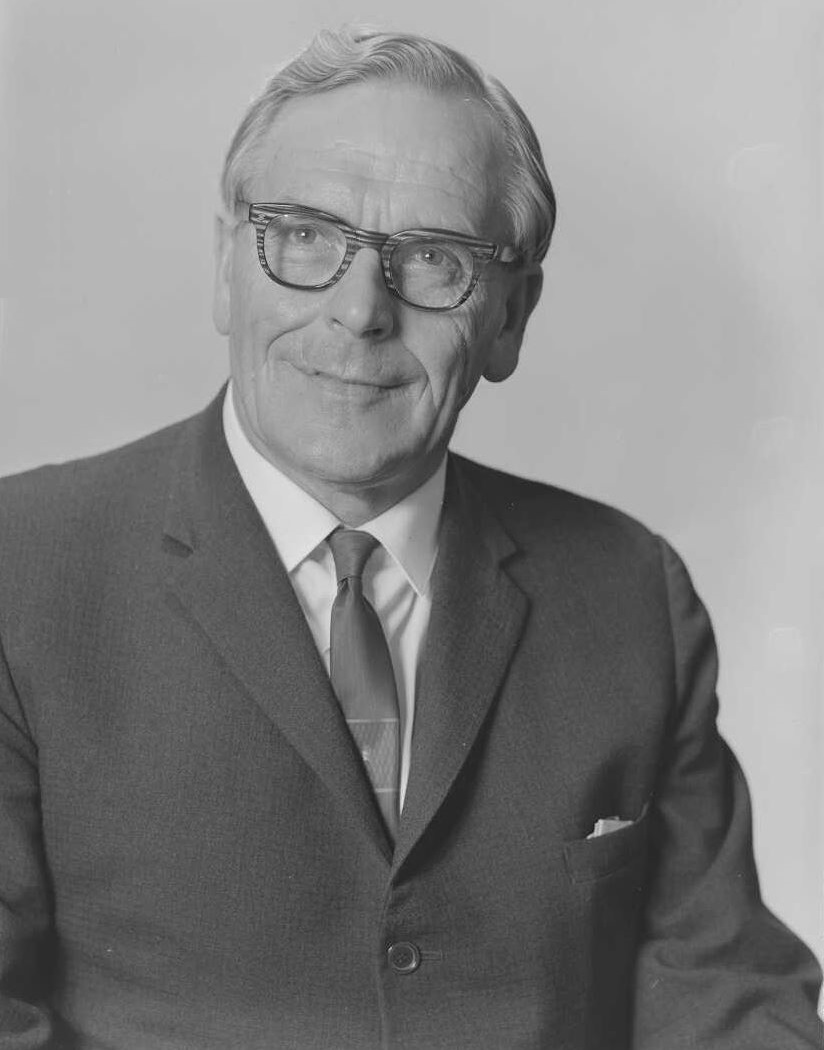
- Dowse in 1966

14th Mayor of Lower Hutt
- In office 18 November 1950 – 9 December 1970
- Deputy: See list: Harry Horlor (1950-56); James McDonald (1956–59); George Barker (1959–62); Chen Werry (1962–68); Dave Hadley (1968-70)
- Preceded by: William Gregory
- Succeeded by: John Kennedy-Good

Personal details
- Born: 4 December 1898 Wigan, Lancashire, England
- Died: 12 September 1970 aged 72y Lower Hutt, New Zealand
- Party: Labour
- Spouse: Mary Kirkman (m. 1922)
- Children: 2

Percy Dowse CBE JP (4 December 1898 – 9 December 1970) was a New Zealand politician. He was mayor of Lower Hutt from 1950 to 1970.

== Biography ==
=== Early life ===
He was born in Lancashire in 1898 and was educated at Wigan Technical College. His coal miner father James was killed in a mining accident when he was eight and his mother with three children got compensation of only £140; Percy thought that "things didn’t seem to be quite adding up" with that money his mother bought a small grocery shop down the road. In West Alton Percy was secretary of the Trades and Labour Council and Organising Secretary of the Independent Labour Party. He became a mines inspector. He married Mary Kirkman in 1922, and the voyage to New Zealand was their honeymoon (they had considered migrating to India instead). They had a son and daughter together. Soon after arriving Dowse gained employment with the New Zealand Railways Department at the Hutt Railway Workshops.

Dowse served in the Royal Air Force during World War II.

=== Political career ===
Dowse was well advanced in his political thinking by the time he arrived in New Zealand and joined the Labour Party. He was a member of the campaign committee for Walter Nash in the Hutt electorate. He then became managing secretary of the Southern Cross, a daily Labour newspaper, for the entirety of its five year existence. In 1929 he attended his first Labour Party conference as a delegate of the Hutt Labour electorate committee. In 1930 he attended as a delegate from the Wellington Amalgamated Engineers Union and stood unsuccessfully for the party's executive. He was elected to the executive in 1935 and would remain a member until 1966. As a member of the executive he moved for the expulsion of John A. Lee from the party.

He was president of the Lower Hutt branch of the Labour Party when he stood for the Lower Hutt Borough Council and the Power Board, and his wife Mary stood for the Wellington Hospital Board in 1935. He was a councillor from 1935 to 1938 when he stood only for the mayoralty, but was narrowly beaten by the incumbent Citizens' Association mayor Jack Andrews. At the following election in 1941 he stood for a council seat again, but was defeated (along with all other Labour candidates) after the infamous 'Nathan Incident' in nearby Wellington. He made a second attempt to win the mayoralty in 1944 but was again defeated by Andrews. He was then elected a Lower Hutt City Councillor again from 1947 to 1950. Dowse had the opportunity to stand for Parliament several times, but declined the offers, believing he could make more of a difference at local government level. He did, however, accept nomination ahead of the 1960 election for the Labour Party nomination for the Heretaunga seat, but was unsuccessful.

On his third attempt he was elected Mayor of Lower Hutt in 1950, defeating the sitting mayor William Gregory. He was to be mayor for the next twenty years from 1950 to 1970. During his tenure, the Town Hall and civic centre (including the War Memorial Library and Little Theatre) and several local community centres were built. The Olympic swimming pool in Naenae as well as many parks and playgrounds were built. Many public works were completed in Dowse's mayoralty including motorway flyovers at Normandale and the Ewen Bridge. Dowse also forced through the controversial fluoridation of Lower Hutt's water system, a new drainage system in Pencarrow and approved the development of several new suburbs including Maungaraki and Stokes Valley.

In 1951 the new Labour council under Dowse faced its first challenge with the proposal to relieve High Street congestion by putting a new road through Riddiford Park, linking Barraud Street (then a cul-de-sac) to Kings Crescent. The alternative was a road alongside the stopbank which the City Engineer said was too expensive and of dubious value. The Barraud Street extension (now Queen's Drive) required moving forty houses from north of Laings Road, and according to the previous mayor William Gregory: "Riddiford Park was one of the most beautiful spots in New Zealand, and its whole character would change if a road was put through it". Five councillors voted against the road, but it went through after an empowering act was passed by Parliament.

The city now found it had a tenacious mayor, determined to drag it up out of the village mentality of the twenties in order to face up to the needs of the fifties.

Dowse was an incredibly hard worker, seldom arriving in his office after 8am or leaving before 5.30pm. He often attended an evening function afterwards, making his normal work day 12 hours or more. In early 1954 he hosted Queen Elizabeth II when she visited Lower Hutt during that years royal tour. Dowse also championed the fluoridation of Lower Hutt's drinking water supply, convincing many reluctant councillors to vote in favour of it in 1957.

During this period of maturation (the mayor was) a man who did not make mere platform pronouncements, and who was astute in political backroom negotiation, Percy Dowse was a ruthlessly practical visionary, a firm man in negotiation, and one who preferred to listen before he spoke. Although his public manner was low-keyed, no-one left his office with any other impression than that he was a quick-witted captain who ran a tight ship.

Dowse was a member of a multitude of community bodies and committees, many of which he was the chairman of. A man of undoubted administration abilities he was reluctant to share responsibilities or delegate which led to complaints that he wielded too much power. From 1947 to 1950 he was a member of the Wellington Free Ambulance Board. From 1950 he was a member of the Hutt Valley Drainage Board and was chairman from 1954 and also chairman of the Hutt Valley Underground Water Authority from 1959. He was chairman of the Wellington Regional Planning Authority executive committee from 1950 to 1970.

He served two spells on the Hutt Valley Electric Power and Gas Board and was chairman of it three times. Dowse was chairman since its inception in 1951 until 1965 and a member until 1968 of the Electric Power Boards of New Zealand. From 1959 until his death he was a member of the Wellington Harbour Board as a representative of the Hutt constituency.

Dowse was also a member of the Hutt Valley and Bays' Metropolitan Milk Board until its abolition and later from 1968 a member of the Hutt Valley and Bays' West Coast Milk Committee. From 1948 he was a member of the Hutt Valley Milk Treatment Corporation and chairman of it from 1960. He was the inaugural chairman of the New Zealand Milk Authorities Association from 1953 to 1955 and a member of the New Zealand Milk Board from 1953.

=== Death ===
He died of cancer in Hutt Hospital in 1970. Despite knowing his condition was fatal he continued working in his mayoral capacity, hiding his illness from all but the deputy mayor, town clerk and his closest friends.

He was survived by his two children, four grandchildren and 3 great grandchildren, his wife Mary had died in a car accident in 1964 while crossing the road. His civic funeral was attended by over 800 people. The St James Anglican Church was filled to capacity with a large crowd on the lawn outside listening via loudspeakers to the eulogies by speakers including Norman Kirk.

== Recognition ==
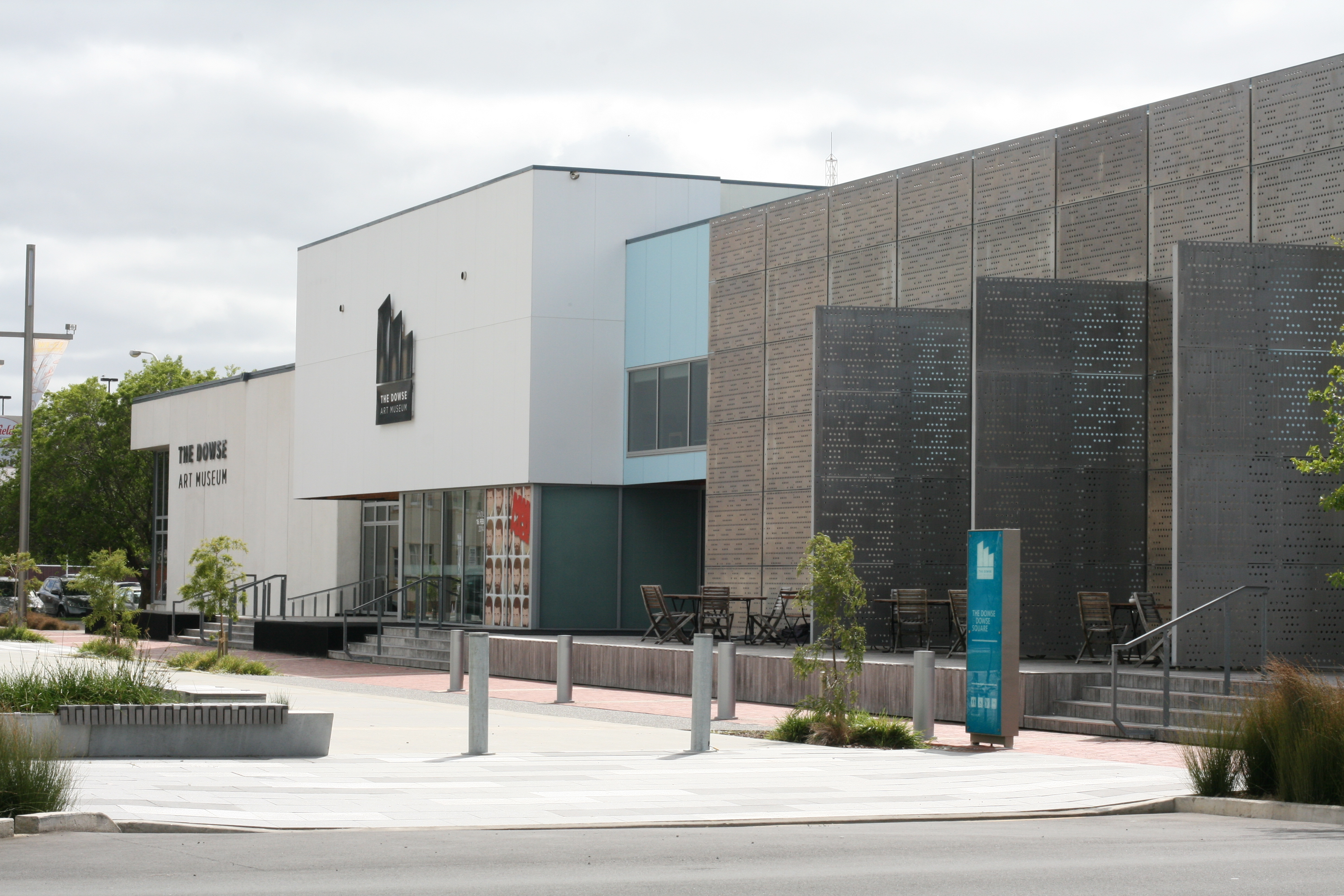
The Dowse Art Museum.

Dowse Drive in the suburb of Maungaraki and The Dowse Art Museum in Lower Hutt are named for him and his wife. From 1950 Dowse had been a local body representative on the National Art Gallery and Dominion Museum board of trustees.

In 1953, Dowse was awarded the Queen Elizabeth II Coronation Medal. In the 1965 New Year Honours, he was appointed a Commander of the Order of the British Empire.

== Notes ==
Political offices
Preceded by William Gregory	Mayor of Lower Hutt; 1950–1970	Succeeded by John Kennedy-Good
