= Hubert Church =

Australian poet

Hubert Newman Wigmore Church (13 June 1857 – 8 April 1932) was a New Zealand-Australian poet.

== Biography ==
Church was born in Hobart, Tasmania, on 13 June 1857. He was the son of Hubert Day Church, a lawyer and his wife Mary Ann Church.

Church was sent to England as a boy where he where he went to school.

When he was 16, he moved to Wellington New Zealand where he worked in the public service. In December 1900, he married Catherine Livingstone McGregor. In 1912, they moved to Melbourne. Church did voluntary service in England during World War I. He returned to New Zealand in 1919 and Melbourne in 1923.

Church died in East Malvern, Melbourne on 8 April 1932. He was 74. When Church, the Daily Mercury said "With the passing of Hubert Church and Fergus Hume, two lamps of Australian literature have been extinguished" and also called him 'a star of his generation'. Church was survived by his wife. The couple had no children.

== Critical reception ==
Of Church's The West Wind, The Sydney Stock and Station Journal said " Hubert Church's cognomen seems to color his work – saintly, churchy in places – not the prim, latter-day churchiness of the modern Methodist, or the naked sullenness of Presbyterianism, but rather the florid ritualism of the Higher High Church that some folk say goes perilously near Paganism.

In 1909, the Bulletin, writing about his latest book, Egmont, said: "we find much that is good, nothing that is the best... Church is never slovenly in his expression. At his best he is simple, direct, and restrained."

Of the second edition of Poems in 1912, the Melbourne Herald said "he has perhaps been somewhat too easily satisfied with his results, and at times one wishes that he would clarify and compress his thought and impart a little more variety and melody to his blank verse".

== Works ==
- The West Wind (1902) Sydney.
- Poems (1st edition, 1904, Wellington)(2nd edition, 1912)
- Egmont (1908) Lothian. Melbourne
- Tonks, a New Zealand Yarn (1916)

== Bibliography ==
- Serle, Percival (1949). "Church, Hubert Newman Wigmore". Dictionary of Australian Biography. Sydney: Angus & Robertson. Dictionary of Australian Biography Ca-Ch] at gutenberg.net.au
- Biography at PoemHunter.com
