= William Gregory (mayor) =

New Zealand politician

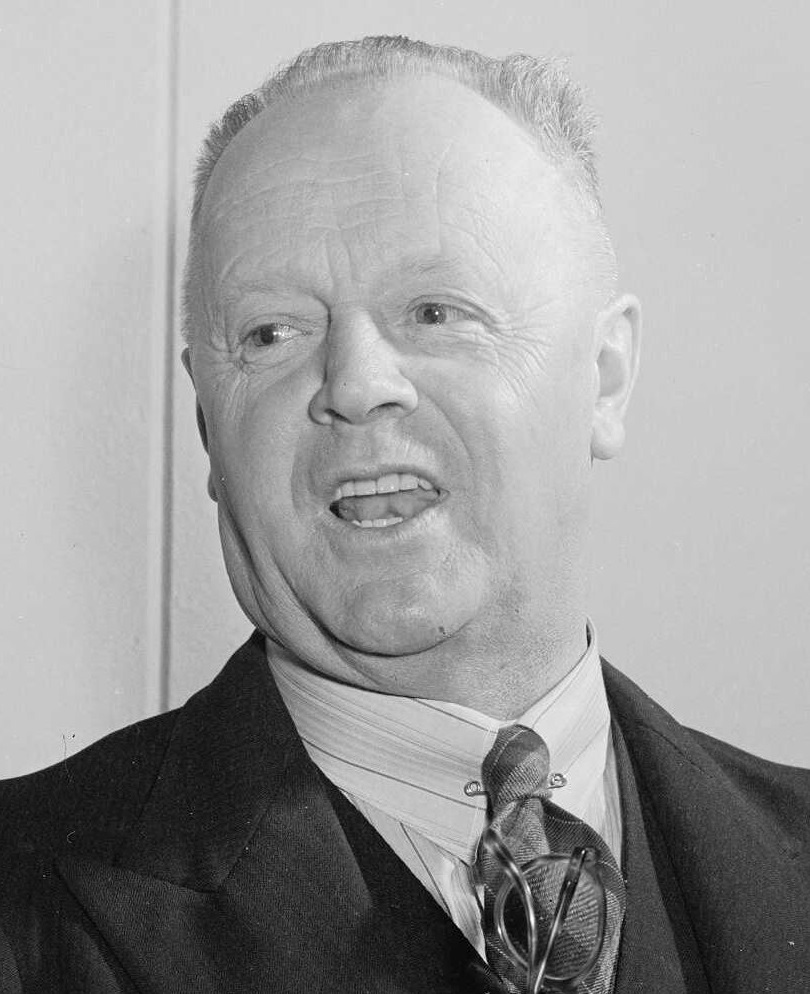

13th Mayor of Lower Hutt
- In office 14 March 1949 – 18 November 1950
- Deputy: Eric Rothwell
- Preceded by: Ernst Peterson Hay
- Succeeded by: Percy Dowse

Personal details
- Born: William Cooper Gregory; 1895 County Wicklow, Ireland
- Died: 23 October 1970 (aged 74–75) Lower Hutt, New Zealand
- Spouse: Anne Dunlop
- Occupation: Estate agent

William Cooper Gregory (1895 – 23 October 1970) was a New Zealand politician who was the Mayor of Lower Hutt from 1949 to 1950.

== Biography ==
He was born in County Wicklow, Ireland and served three years in France during World War I. After the war he emigrated to New Zealand where he had several vocations after arriving in farming, the timber trade and auctioneering. He later became the director of a building and farming supplies company before being employed as the managing director of Montgomery's Furnishings Store in Levin. He moved to Lower Hutt in 1930 and stated his own real estate business; W Gregory & Co Ltd. In 1941 he married Anne Dunlop.

He was elected a member of the Lower Hutt Borough Council on a Citizens' Association ticket from 1938 to 1949. In June 1947 the mayor, Jack Andrews, resigned and the councillors elected deputy mayor Ernst Peterson Hay as his replacement for the remainder of the term until the scheduled election in November. At the same meeting Gregory was selected unanimously to replace Hay as deputy mayor. When Hay resigned mid-term in January 1949 Gregory was elected mayor in March 1949 at a by-election. At the November 1950 election Gregory was defeated for the mayoralty by Labour Party councillor Percy Dowse.

He retained an interest in civic affairs and in 1951 he was one of the objectors to the proposal of the new Labour majority council to relieve High Street congestion by putting a new road through Riddiford Park, linking Barraud Street (then a cul-de-sac) to Kings Crescent. The alternative was a road alongside the stop bank which the City Engineer said was too expensive and of dubious value. The Barraud Street extension (now Queen's Drive) required moving forty houses from north of Laings Road, and according to Gregory: "Riddiford Park was one of the most beautiful spots in New Zealand, and its whole character would change if a road was put through it" Five councillors voted against the road, but it went through after an empowering act was passed by Parliament.

In 1953, Gregory was awarded the Queen Elizabeth II Coronation Medal. At the 1953 local elections he declined to seek the mayoralty again but stood for a council seat. However, he was defeated (alongside all other Citizens' candidates).

== Notes ==
Political offices
Preceded by Ernst Peterson Hay	Mayor of Lower Hutt; 1949–1950	Succeeded by Percy Dowse
Preceded by Ernst Peterson Hay	Deputy Mayor of Lower Hutt; 1947–1949	Succeeded by Eric Rothwell
