= Campbell Begg =

New Zealand doctor and politician (1886–1971)

Campbell Begg MC
- Born: 11 April 1886; Dunedin, New Zealand
- Died: 26 July 1971 (aged 85); Johannesburg, South Africa
- Occupations: Politician, activist
- Years active: 1933–1935
- Organization: New Zealand Legion
- Known for: Leadership of the New Zealand Legion

Robert Campbell Begg MC (11 April 1886 – 26 July 1971) was a New Zealand medical doctor and politician who served as the president of the conservative New Zealand Legion from 1933 until 1934–35. Born in New Zealand and educated in Scotland, Begg then served in World War I. He returned to New Zealand after completing his education, going on to serve in the leadership of the New Zealand Legion in the years before its dissolution. He also wrote a series of medical textbooks.

== Biography ==
=== Early life and military service ===
He was born in Dunedin on 11 April 1886. He first studied theology and then studied medicine at the University of Edinburgh, qualifying MB ChB. After serving as a medical officer during World War I, for which he was awarded the Military Cross. His service included treating Indian soldiers in Flanders and Egyptian soldiers during the Gallipoli campaign. He then returned to Edinburgh, gaining an MD in 1923.

=== New Zealand Legion ===
Begg was the president of the New Zealand Legion from 1933 until 1935. In 1935, Begg was awarded the King George V Silver Jubilee Medal. During his tenure as President of the Legion, Begg was approached by the Nazis as a potential fascist political organization, but he rebuked the Nazis, reportedly calling their ideology 'absurd'. In 1937, Begg moved with his family to South Africa.

=== Later life ===
Begg died on 26 July 1971, in Johannesburg, South Africa; he was survived by his five children.

== Bibliography ==
- The Secret of the Knife: A Surgeon's Story (1965)
- Surgery on Trestles: A Saga of Suffering and Triumph (1967) ISBN 9780853063407
- Amazon to Cape Horn on a Shoestring (1969) ISBN 9780853061649
