= Ernst Hay =

New Zealand lawyer and judge (1886–1955)

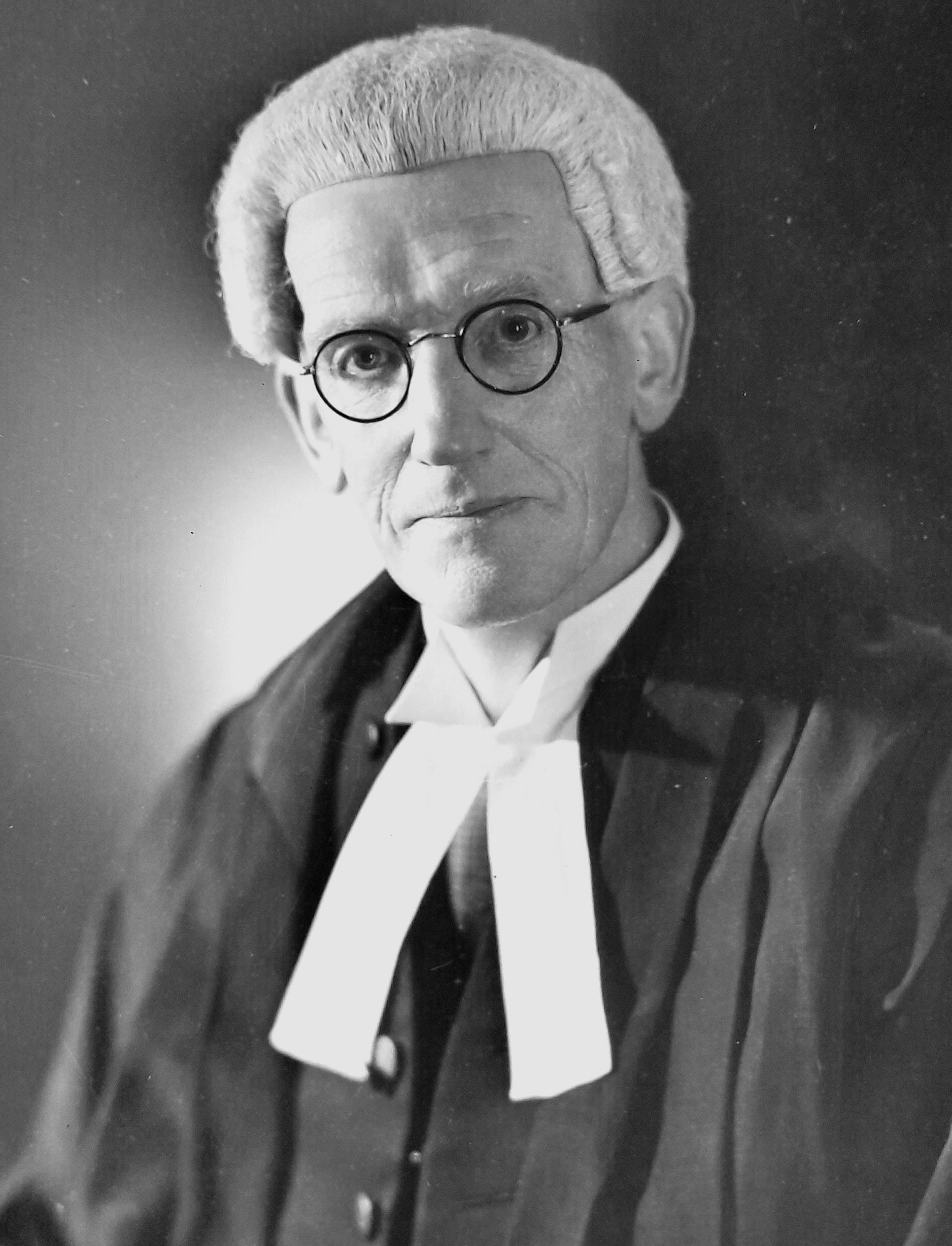

12th Mayor of Lower Hutt
- In office 9 June 1947 – 20 January 1949
- Deputy: William Gregory
- Preceded by: Jack Andrews
- Succeeded by: William Gregory

Personal details
- Born: Ernst Peterson Hay; 7 July 1886 Lawrence, New Zealand
- Died: 31 December 1955 (aged 69) Lower Hutt, New Zealand
- Spouse: Agnes Mitchell
- Children: 5
- Relatives: James Hay (brother); David Hay (nephew); Hamish Hay (nephew); Laurie Salas (niece)
- Occupation: Lawyer

Ernst Peterson Hay (7 July 1886 – 31 December 1955) was a New Zealand lawyer, judge and local politician. He was the mayor of Lower Hutt from 1947 to 1949.

== Biography ==
Hay was born in Lawrence in 1886 to William Hay. He was educated at Lawrence District High School and later became an assistant solicitor at the Public Trust Office in 1910. He was later a lawyer at the Wellington firm of Mazengarb, Hay and Macalister (founded 1918) with Ossie Mazengarb and Robert Macalister. He was also the President of the Wellington Rotary Club in 1939. During World War II Hay acted as chairman of the Armed Forces Appeal Board at Wellington. He was married to Agnes Mitchell with whom he had two sons and three daughters. His brother was Christchurch businessman and city councillor Sir James Hay.

Hay was a member of the Lower Hutt Borough Council from 1938 to 1947. In June 1947 the mayor, Jack Andrews, resigned and the councillors elected Hay as mayor for the remainder of the term until the scheduled election in November. He was re-elected mayor at the November 1947 election. In 1948, he was appointed as a Judge of the Supreme Court of New Zealand. After joining the judiciary he resigned as mayor on 20 January 1949. In 1953, Hay was awarded the Queen Elizabeth II Coronation Medal.

Hay retired in February 1955, owing to illness, and died on 31 December that year. He was cremated, and had his ashes interred at the Karori Cemetery crematorium. His wife Agnes, who was a benefactor and volunteer for the Red Cross and Women's Guild, died in 1959.

== Notes ==
Political offices
Preceded by Jack Andrews	Mayor of Lower Hutt; 1947–1949	Succeeded by William Gregory
