= Jack Andrews (New Zealand politician) =

New Zealand politician (1892–1983)

Jack Andrews OBE
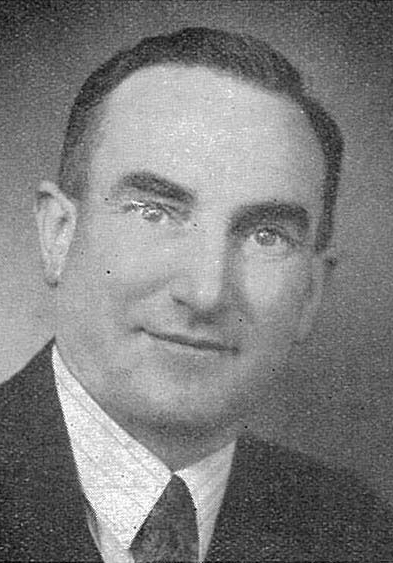

11th Mayor of Lower Hutt
- In office 10 May 1933 – 9 June 1947
- Preceded by: Will Strand
- Succeeded by: Ernst Peterson Hay

Personal details
- Born: 8 May 1892 Masterton, New Zealand
- Died: 27 June 1983 (aged 91) Lower Hutt, New Zealand
- Party: National (from 1936)
- Other political affiliations: Legion (1935–36); United (1928–35); Liberal (1925–28)
- Spouse: Margaret Latham (m. 1921; died 1978)
- Children: 2
- Occupation: Company director

John William Andrews OBE (8 May 1892 – 27 June 1983) was a New Zealand businessman and politician. He was Mayor of Lower Hutt from 1933 to 1947.

== Biography ==
Andrews was born in Masterton in 1892. He was educated at Masterton District High School before enlisting in the army during World War I. He was a captain in the New Zealand Rifle Brigade and was wounded in action during the Battle of Messines. After the war he founded and operated a joinery manufacturing business in Masterton and was elected to the Masterton Borough Council. He stood in the 1925 election in the Masterton electorate for the Liberal Party, but was defeated by the incumbent, Reform's George Sykes.

In 1927 he moved to Lower Hutt and opened a joinery factory. As the company director of the factory he was elected president of the Lower Hutt Chamber of Commerce. He became involved in politics in Lower Hutt as well and joined the United Party and organised James Kerr's campaign at the 1929 Hutt by-election.

At the 1929 local-body elections he stood for the Lower Hutt Borough Council on the incipient People's Party ticket. He was unsuccessful but polled well, being the second highest polling unsuccessful candidate and only 30 votes being the last successful candidate.. From 1933, he was elected Mayor of Lower Hutt for five consecutive terms. He was also a member of the Wellington Harbour Board. He was first elected in 1938 (after being defeated in 1935) and served three terms until 1947. As mayor he worked to provide welfare and support to the unemployed. He began a public works scheme to provide employment relief during the Great Depression by upgrading the facilities of the Hutt Recreation Ground, including a new grandstand being erected. In 1935 he adopted Lower Hutt's first ever systematic town plan. He stood in the 1938 in the Hutt electorate for the National Party, but could not unseat the incumbent, Labour's Walter Nash.

The 1940s was a period of rapid population growth in the area with the addition of thousands of new state houses in the new suburbs of Epuni, Waddington and Naenae. He was a Battalion Commander in the Home Guard during World War II. In 1945 he revamped the city's rating system from unimproved value to annual rental value. He was president of the Municipal Association of New Zealand from 1944 to 1947 leading him to take up an appointment as a member of the Local Government Commission. He resigned from the mayoralty towards the end of the triennium to take up his role at the commission. He had another try at winning a parliamentary seat standing in Hutt again at the 1951 election against Nash (who by this time was party leader). He was unsuccessful once again. In 1954 he retired from the Local Government Commission.

Andrews died on 27 June 1983. He was survived by his son and daughter, his wife predeceased him by five years.

== Awards and honours ==
In the 1950 King's Birthday Honours, Andrews was appointed an Officer of the Order of the British Empire, in recognition of his 15 years of service as mayor of Lower Hutt. In 1953, he was awarded the Queen Elizabeth II Coronation Medal. Andrews Avenue in Lower Hutt city was named after him.

== Notes ==
Political offices
Preceded by Will Strand	Mayor of Lower Hutt; 1933–1947	Succeeded by Ernst Peterson Hay
