= 1921 Lower Hutt mayoral by-election =

← 1921	21 December 1921	1923 →
- Turnout: 2,189 (60.80%)
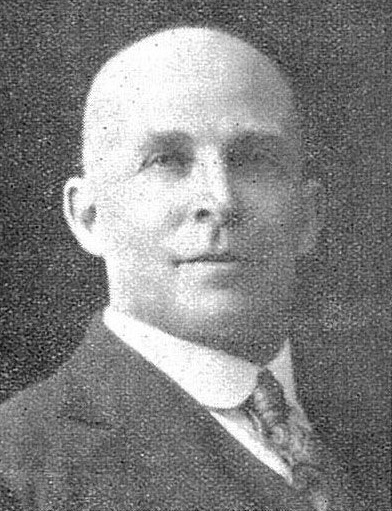

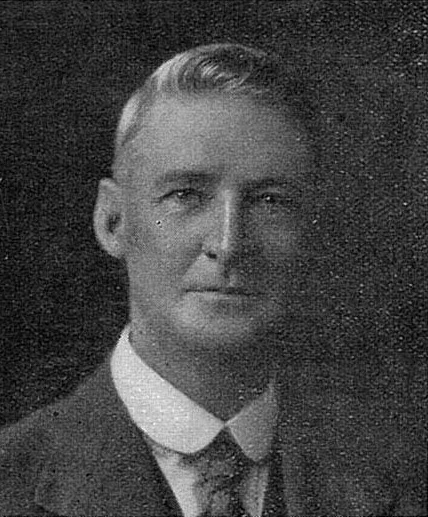
Candidate	Will Strand	Percy Rishworth
Party	Independent	Independent
Popular vote	1,265	906
Percentage	57.78	41.39
Mayor before election
Percy Rishworth
Elected mayor
Will Strand

The 1921 Lower Hutt mayoral by-election was triggered by the resignation of the incumbent, Percy Rishworth, just eight months after he had been re-elected for a third term. The polling was conducted using the standard first-past-the-post electoral method.

== Background ==
Percy Rishworth had been Mayor of Lower Hutt since 1918 after the previous mayor, Henry Baldwin, resigned. His tenure included coordinating the council's response to the Spanish flu epidemic and his response was praised. Consequently, he was unopposed at the next two mayoral elections. In 1921 Rishworth had a disagreement with the Ratepayers' Association and some of the councillors over the erection of a gasworks in Lower Hutt as an alternative to continue paying for the use of the gasworks in neighbouring Petone. The public were supportive of a new gasworks and voted in favour of erecting one in a plebiscite. However the Ratepayers' Association remained opposed it. Councillor Will Strand made a speech in December 1921 to the Ratepayers' Association accusing Rishworth of a 'breach of faith' which was later leaked to reporters and published by local newspapers. At the next scheduled meeting of the council Rishworth addressed the matter and issued a challenge to Strand to resign along with himself and contest an election for mayor. Strand accepted the challenge and the two contested the mayoralty. The election proceeded to resolve itself into one of supporters of the erection of a gasworks and those against it backing Rishworth and Strand respectively.

== Result ==
1921 Lower Hutt mayoral by-election
Party	Candidate	Votes	%	±%
Independent	Will Strand	1,265	57.78	
Independent	Percy Rishworth	906	41.39	
Informal votes		18	0.83	
Majority		359	16.40	
Turnout		2,189	60.80	

As Strand resigned his council seat to stand for the mayoralty he triggered a second by-election for one council seat. A further poll was avoided as Allan Macaskill was the only candidate nominated so was elected unopposed.
