= 1929 Lower Hutt mayoral election =

- 1 May 1929
- Turnout: 3,877 (59.12%)
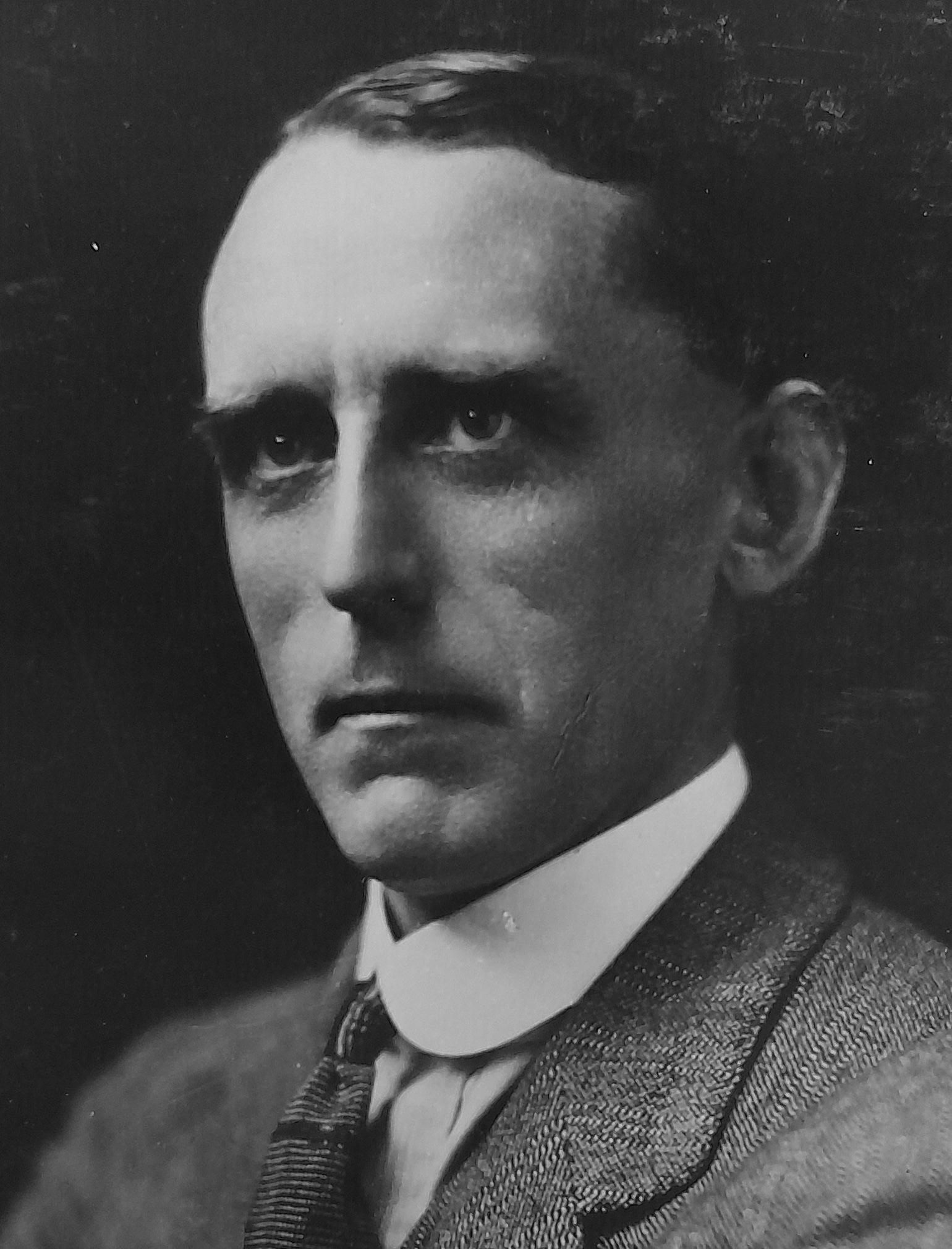

Candidate	Sir Alex Roberts	Justin M. Power
Party	Citizens'	People's Party
Popular vote	2,608	1,246
Percentage	67.26	32.13
Mayor before election
Will Strand
Elected mayor
Sir Alex Roberts

The 1929 Lower Hutt mayoral election was part of the New Zealand local elections held that same year. The elections were held for the role of Mayor of Lower Hutt plus other local government positions including the nine borough councillors, also elected biennially. The polling was conducted using the standard first-past-the-post electoral method.

== Background ==
The mayor, Will Strand, decided not to accept nomination for a further term after which efforts were made to have councillor Sir Alex Roberts to stand for the position. Roberts has agreed to accept nomination for the mayoralty in response to a deputation. At a meeting of the Chamber of Commerce, Justin McCarthy Power, was requested to stand for mayor which he accepted.

== Mayoral results ==
1929 Lower Hutt mayoral election
Party	Candidate	Votes	%	±%
Citizens'	Sir Alex Roberts	2,608	67.26	
People's Party	Justin M. Power	1,246	32.13	
Informal votes		23	0.59	
Majority		1,362	35.13	
Turnout		3,877	59.12	

== Councillor results ==
1929 Lower Hutt Borough Council election
Party	Candidate	Votes	%	±%
Citizens'	James Roberts Boyd	2,325	59.96	
Citizens'	Archibald Hobbs	2,292	59.11	−28.66
Citizens'	Archibald Grierson	2,190	56.48	−25.09
Citizens'	Alexander McBain	2,175	56.10	−30.12
Citizens'	Frank Campbell	2,022	52.15	−14.64
Citizens'	Walter Meldrum	1,953	50.37	−20.83
Citizens'	John Mitchell	1,662	42.86	−24.70
Citizens'	Arthur Carver	1,631	42.06	−15.60
Citizens'	Douglas Smith Patrick	1,537	39.64	
People's Party	Alex Anderson	1,534	39.56	
People's Party	Jack Andrews	1,517	39.12	
People's Party	Rudolph Godfrey Anderson	1,225	31.59	
People's Party	Helmore Henry Brown	1,225	31.59	
People's Party	John Wyatt Newell	1,213	31.28	
People's Party	Isaac Campbell Kennedy	1,151	29.68	
People's Party	Stanley Watkins	1,151	29.68	
People's Party	Eric Rothwell	1,119	28.86	
Independent	Walter Cotton	491	12.66	−12.49
Independent	Edward John Seager	423	10.91	
