= 1931 Lower Hutt mayoral election =

- 8 May 1931
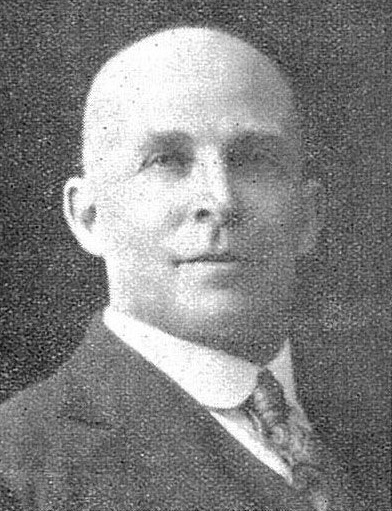
Candidate	Will Strand
Party	Citizens'
Popular vote	Unopposed
Mayor before election
Sir Alex Roberts
Elected mayor
Will Strand

The 1931 Lower Hutt mayoral election was part of the New Zealand local elections held that same year. The elections were held for the role of Mayor of Lower Hutt plus other local government positions including the nine borough councillors, also elected biennially. The polling was conducted using the standard first-past-the-post electoral method.

== Background ==
A committee waited on the mayor, Sir Alex Roberts, requesting that he accept nomination for a second term as mayor. Roberts said he would consider the matter. He later said he would not accept nomination for another term. His time as mayor had been dominated by the Great Depression where he did what he could to provide relief for impoverished. Former mayor Will Strand was asked to stand in place of Roberts, which he accepted to do. The Lower Hutt branch of the Labour Party decided not to run a candidate for the mayoralty or a full ticket of council candidates. With no other candidates emerging Strand was declared elected unopposed. The Labour Party did nominate two council candidates.

== Councillor results ==
1931 Lower Hutt Borough Council election
Party	Candidate	Votes	%	±%
Citizens'	Archibald Grierson	1,702	71.72	+14.90
Citizens'	Alexander McBain	1,685	71.00	+14.57
Citizens'	Alex Anderson	1,679	70.75	+30.95
Citizens'	Frank Campbell	1,652	69.61	+17.15
Citizens'	Douglas Patrick	1,651	69.57	+29.69
Citizens'	Barton Ginger	1,509	63.59	
Citizens'	John Mitchell	1,380	58.15	+15.03
Independent	Walter George Meldrum	1,370	57.73	+7.06
Citizens'	William Henry Wilson	1,365	57.52	
Citizens'	Eric Rothwell	1,344	56.63	+27.60
Labour	James Eric Napier	1,160	48.88	
Labour	Albert Edwin Sergent	1,017	42.85	
Independent	Albert Jackson	951	40.07	
