= 1923 Lower Hutt mayoral election =

- 26 April 1923
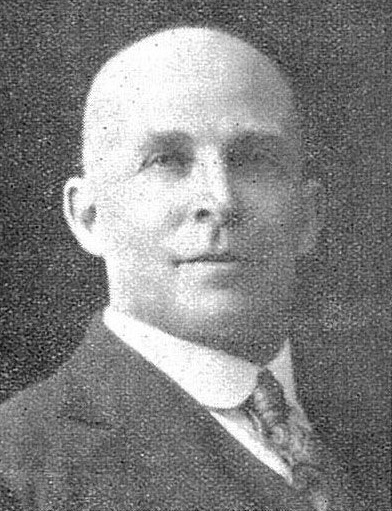
Candidate	Will Strand
Party	Independent
Popular vote	Unopposed
Mayor before election
Will Strand
Elected mayor
Will Strand

The 1923 Lower Hutt mayoral election was part of the New Zealand local elections held that same year. The elections were held for the role of Mayor of Lower Hutt plus other local government positions including the nine borough councillors, also elected biennially. The polling was conducted using the standard first-past-the-post electoral method.

== Background ==
The incumbent mayor, Will Strand, stood again for a second term in office. No other candidates emerged and consequently he was declared elected unopposed.

== Councillor results ==
1923 Lower Hutt Borough Council election
Party	Candidate	Votes	%	±%
Citizens'	Alexander McBain	1,358	88.41	+4.48
Citizens'	Archibald Hobbs	1,267	82.48	+5.68
Citizens'	Herbert George Teagle	1,255	81.70	
Citizens'	David Ewen	1,233	80.27	
Citizens'	Alex Roberts	1,212	78.90	
Citizens'	Ernest Hunt	1,160	75.52	
Citizens'	Walter Meldrum	1,088	70.83	−10.05
Citizens'	John Mitchell	1,048	68.22	+0.86
Citizens'	Lemuel Thomas Watkins	989	64.38	
Independent	Archibald Grierson	511	33.26	
Independent	Walter Cotton	447	29.10	−46.19
Ind. Progressive	Henry James Poole	416	27.08	
Independent	Walter Dempsy	388	25.26	
Independent	James Forsyth	326	21.22	
Independent	John W. Jones	280	18.22	
Independent	Frederick Brattle	205	13.34	
Independent	Thomas De Charles Bell	193	12.56	
Independent	Robert Hazelwood	177	11.52	
Independent	Walter Andrews	174	11.32	
