= William Fitzherbert =

William Fitzherbert may refer to:

- Saint William of York, Archbishop of York
- William Fitzherbert (politician, born 1810) (1810–1891), New Zealand politician
- Sir William FitzHerbert, 1st Baronet (1748–1791), of Derbyshire
- William FitzHerbert (MP), British MP for Derby 1762–1772, and the 1st Baronet's father
- William Fitzherbert (c. 1520–1559?), MP for Lichfield
- William Fitzherbert (mayor) (1842–1906), mayor of Lower Hutt, New Zealand
