= Walter George Foster =

New Zealand businessman and mayor

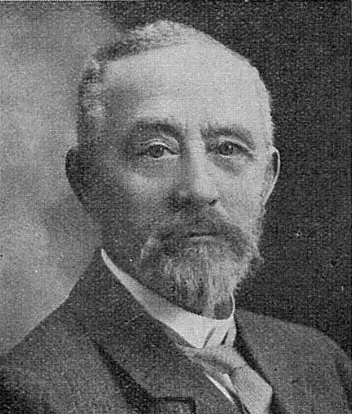

2nd Mayor of Lower Hutt
- In office 18 November 1898 – 5 March 1900
- Preceded by: William Fitzherbert
- Succeeded by: Edmund Percy Bunny

Personal details
- Born: 1846 London, England
- Died: 18 April 1929 (aged 82–83) Wellington, New Zealand
- Spouse: Catherine Fleming (m. 1874)
- Children: 6
- Profession: Managing director

Walter George Foster (1846 – 18 April 1929) was a New Zealand businessman and politician who was mayor of Lower Hutt from 1898 to 1900.

== Biography ==
In 1859 he sailed from London to Canterbury aboard the ship Zealandia of which his father, Captain John Foster, was in command. He entered land management and managed the Purau and Seadowns Estate in South Canterbury. By the 1880s he was manager of the Miles and Co. firm in Christchurch before moving to Wellington in 1888 to become the manager of the New Zealand Loan and Mercantile Agency Company. In the 1890s he was appointed as a manager of the Asset Realisation Board by Richard Seddon to deal with asset liquidity of the Bank of New Zealand. Afterwards he was the managing director of the Wellington Meat Export Company before retiring from the role in October 1919.

He got involved in local politics via management of the Hutt River lobbying Seddon to assist financially in the establishment of a river board. For two years he was Mayor of Lower Hutt between 1898 and 1900 when he resigned. As mayor, his main efforts were to improve the quality of the roading in the borough and formalised all streets with the status as public thoroughfares. In 1905 he stood for the mayoralty again after Orton Stevens retired. He was defeated in the election by Thomas William McDonald.

He died at his home in Island Bay aged 83 after a short illness. He was survived by his wife, son and five daughters.

Political offices
Preceded by William Fitzherbert	Mayor of Lower Hutt; 1898–1900	Succeeded by Edmund Percy Bunny
