= Fitzherbert (disambiguation) =

Fitzherbert is a ward of Palmerston North, Manawatu-Wanganui, New Zealand.

Fitzherbert might also refer to:

== People ==
=== Surname ===
- Peter FitzHerbert (d.1235), English baron and one of the twenty-five named in Magna Carta
- Anthony Fitzherbert (1470–1538), English judge
- Basil Fitzherbert, 14th Baron Stafford (1926–1986), English landowner and peer
- Dionys Fitzherbert (c.1580–1640), English spiritual life writer
- Eugene Fitzherbert, fictional character from Disney's Tangled
- Francis Fitzherbert, 15th Baron Stafford, (born 1954)
- Margaret Fitzherbert (born 1969), Australian politician
- Maria Fitzherbert, Spouse of King George IV (marriage void)
- Nicholas Fitzherbert, 1550-1612
- Alleyne FitzHerbert, 1st Baron St Helens (1753–1839)
- Thomas Fitzherbert (1552–1640)
- William Fitzherbert (disambiguation), multiple people
- FitzHerbert baronets, Baronetcy of Tissington was created 1784

=== Given name ===
- Christopher Fitzherbert Hackett, Barbadian
- Fitzherbert Adams (1651—1719), scholar and benefactor
- Henry FitzHerbert Wright (1870–1947), lawyer
- Fitzherbert Marriott, 19th century archdeacon of Hobart
