= David Ewen =

David Ewen may refer to:

- David Ewen (politician) (1884–1957), New Zealand businessman, soldier, and politician
- David Ewen (writer) (1907–1985), American writer on music and editor
