= Mrs. Fitzherbert (disambiguation) =

Maria Fitzherbert (1756–1837) was a putative wife of George IV of the United Kingdom.

Mrs. Fitzherbert may also refer to:

- Mrs. Fitzherbert, U.S. title of Princess Fitz, 1945 historical novel by Winifred Carter
  - Mrs. Fitzherbert (film), 1947 adaptation of Princess Fitz, also released as Princess Fitz and A Court Secret
- Mrs Fitzherbert, 1960 biography by Anita Leslie

== See also ==
- Fitzherbert (disambiguation)
