= Thomas Peterkin =

New Zealand engineer and politician

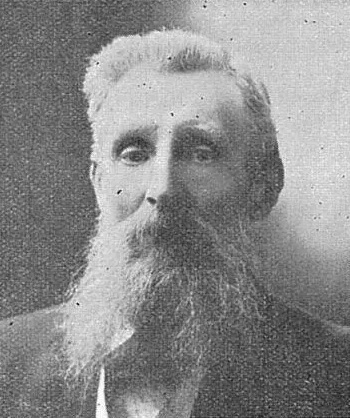

6th Mayor of Lower Hutt
- In office 1 May 1907 – 6 May 1909
- Preceded by: Thomas William McDonald
- Succeeded by: Edmund Percy Bunny

Personal details
- Born: 1839 London, England
- Died: 12 June 1926 (aged 86–87) Lower Hutt, New Zealand
- Profession: Engineer

Thomas Alexander Peterkin (1839 – 12 June 1926) was a British born New Zealand engineer and politician who was mayor of Lower Hutt.

== Biography ==
Peterkin was born in 1839 in London. He found employment with the London and North Western Railway, later becoming a leading hand. He then emigrated to Victoria, Australia, to become manager of the Vulcan Foundry at Geelong. Three years later he superintended the building of a freezing works at Rockhampton and established a foundry there as well. He then became an engineer overseeing cable work before shifting to New Zealand. In 1876 he was appointed as a railway engineer at Westport, later becoming manager of the Christchurch Tramway Company. He rejoined the railways department, working at Hillside and Addington, and was again manager at Westport for seven years. In 1897 he moved to Wellington where he was a locomotive engineer.

In 1907 he was elected Mayor of Lower Hutt, defeating borough councillors Albert Burton Clark and Frederick de Jersey Clere for the position. He presided over a period of large population growth and urbanisation. The council spent on upgrading sewage and water infrastructure and constructing public facilities causing the council to amass much debt. By the time Peterkin retired as mayor the council had almost no money left for any further expenditure. After he left office an independent audit of the council's finances and its £7,000 debt was held but found no corruption or willful mismanagement by Peterkin and the council members, though City Engineer Henry Rix-Trott would resign over the matter in 1910.

He died at his home in Lower Hutt in 1926.

== Notes ==
Political offices
Preceded by Thomas William McDonald	Mayor of Lower Hutt; 1907–1909	Succeeded by Edmund Percy Bunny
