= Tittensor =

Coordinates: 52.942°N 2.189°W

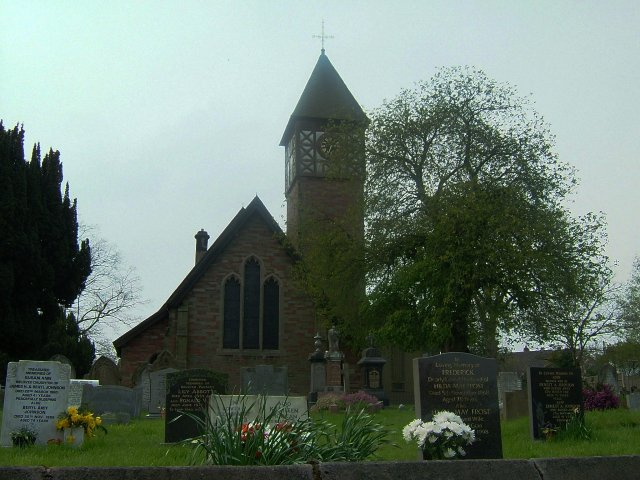
- St Luke's Church, Tittensor

- Location within Staffordshire
- Civil parish: Swynnerton
- District: Stafford
- Shire county: Staffordshire
- Region: West Midlands
- Country: England
- Sovereign state: United Kingdom
- Post town: Stoke-on-Trent
- Postcode district: ST12
- Police: Staffordshire
- Fire: Staffordshire
- Ambulance: West Midlands
- UK Parliament: Stoke-on-Trent South

Tittensor village is located in Staffordshire, England, between Stoke-on-Trent and Stone. The population as taken at the 2011 census can be found under Swynnerton. The village consists of mostly 1960s housing as well as the few remaining houses from the 19th century. Historically Tittensor forms part of Stone parish. The Tittensor family occupied a manor house which passed to the Gerrard family sometime before 1405. The house was destroyed and rebuilt several times over the centuries, and was finally demolished in 1834. Some of the materials were used to build St Luke's church in Tittensor which was constructed in 1880-81. The ruins of the manor house remained until they were finally demolished in the early 1960s.

== History ==
It was originally mentioned in the Domesday Book and became part of the Trentham Estate of the Duke of Sutherland in the nineteenth century. The village was enlarged in the 1960s by a private estate, providing the majority of the houses that stand there today, including council owned houses. In 2002 Tittensor has been expanded by a new development on the site of Groundslow Hospital, an old maternity hospital. Groundslow Villa was built in 1832 as a hunting lodge for the Duke of Sutherland when he lived at Trentham Park (the date can be seen on one of the walls) and in 1913 was sold and became a tuberculosis sanatorium as an annexe to the Staffordshire General Infirmary in Stafford.

In 1956 it was still a tuberculosis sanatorium, with separate men's and women's wards. In later years, certainly by 1960, the former women's TB building had become a 117-bed maternity hospital, until closure in 1983. Camelot Court nursing home later opened in the administrative block of the former hospital in September 1985, while Groundslow Grange care home opened in October 1984 in the former nurses' accommodation, which had been built in 1949. It was run by Peter Ratchford and former Benny Hill girl Anne Bruzac. The residential care home closed in 1997, and by 2002 the adjacent former hospital was redeveloped into detached homes and terraces, while the Duke's former home was converted into 25 flats.

== Village hall ==
The village hall is located just off the main A34 along Winghouse Lane.

The land of about one acre was given by conveyance dated 10 April 1956 made between Thomas Fortescue Crawshay Frost, the Honourable William Humble David Ward and Arthur Stephen Fuller (acting as the 'Sutherland Trustees') for the purpose of a Village Hall for the Benefit of the inhabitants of the Parish of Tittensor and the neighbourhood. This Land was originally part of the late Duke of Sutherland's estate left in trust on 13 June 1960 by Frederick Maitland Wright, Thomas Robert Copeland, Mary Clare Bassett and Harold Spilsbury.

The hall is used for meetings, lectures and classes, recreation and leisure with the object of improving the conditions of life for its residents. The opening of the hall was held on Saturday 7 July 1956 and was performed by Mrs Maitland Wright on behalf of her mother Mrs Frank Wedgwood who was in South Africa. She was one of the prime movers in the campaign for a village hall. The brick-built hall, costing £5,000, was designed and planned by Albert Homes an assistant Surveyor to the Stone Rural District Council, who lived next door to the hall. The committee had been trying to get a hall for some six years, after residents had begun to subscribe money after the First World War, some thirty years before.

An alcove extension to the width of the hall was in the planning from 1985 with the free work being undertaken by the Community Programme Agency the original scheme to cost £7,000 for materials. This turned out to become £21,260 and by 1990 the Community Programme Agency was disbanded and became the Employment Training Division. Meanwhile, extensions to the kitchen and toilets were completed in 1990.

During 2003/4 a complete renovation was completed. This included new ceiling tiles and Led lighting, replacement flooring in the alcove, passage and kitchen new chairs, tables and curtains. To complete the project the hall was completely redecorated. A child's play area project was completed adjacent to the village hall using £20,000 from Stafford Borough Council Section 106 funds (resulting from housing development at Groundslow) plus a grant from the Staffordshire Environmental Fund (landfill tax) of £30,000. The grants were made to Swynnerton Parish Council and the land was also leased to them by the village hall. The council took the responsibility for ownership, maintenance and insurance.

In 2013 a defibrillator was sited on the outside wall of the hall. Donations were received from all the village groups, Bassetts and the parish council of £1,537. Training was given to two groups of residents.

== Facilities ==
In the village there is St Luke's Church, a village shop and post office, a village hall, a car sales garage and a wine shop. A converted private house in the village is home to a small community of adults with learning difficulties, some of whom attend the church regularly.

== Transport ==
It lies on the A34 road which is dual carriageway through the village, with a 40 mph speed limit and speed cameras. It is well served by regular bus service (number 101) north to Trentham, Newcastle-under-Lyme and Stoke-on-Trent and south to Stone and Stafford.

There is also a freight transport company.

The Winghouse public house closed in 2012 and houses have been built on the site. The village hall is a very popular venue for local organisations. It has a bowling green and in 2013 a new child's play area – with land leased to Swynnerton Parish Council who maintain the project.

== Education ==
There is a primary school which has close links with the church, and some church members serve on the board of governors. There are about 60 children in the school at present, some coming from outside the village. Daily coaches from the village offer transport to middle and high schools serving the Stone district.

== Leisure ==
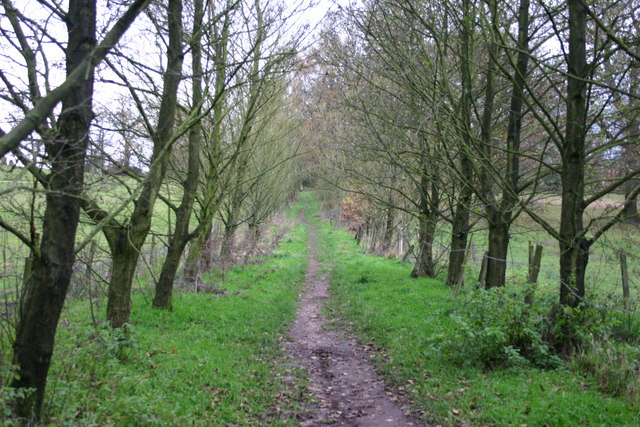
A woodland walk in Tittensor

The village has a bowling green with an active club and also has a well supported Gardening Guild that hosts its own show each summer. The 'Green Drive' is a lake and woodland area, often used by dog walkers, located next to the village, and once home to a children's playground which has since been removed. The area offers a large lake attracting anglers, as well as nature sightings for visitors. Wildlife includes kingfishers and wildcats.

== Nearby locations ==
- Barlaston
- Meaford
- Swynnerton
- Trentham

== See also ==
- Listed buildings in Swynnerton
- Alun Kyte, multiple murderer who was born in the village
