= Thomas Fitzherbert =

16th/17th-century English Jesuit

Thomas Fitzherbert (1552 – 17 August 1640) was an English Jesuit.

== Early life ==
Fitzherbert was born at Swynnerton, Staffordshire. He was the eldest son and heir of William Fitzherbert and grandson of Sir Anthony Fitzherbert, a Justice of the Common Pleas. His father having died whilst he was an infant, he was, even as a child, the head of an important family and the first heir born at Swynnerton, where his descendants have since flourished and still remain Catholics. He was trained to piety and firmness in his religion by his mother, and when sent to Oxford in his sixteenth year he confessed his faith with a courage that grew with the various trials, of which he has left us an interesting memoir. At last he was forced to keep in hiding, and in 1572 he was imprisoned for recusancy. On his release he moved to London.

== Marriage and move to France ==
In 1580 he married and had children, but he did not give up his religious works. When Edmund Campion and Robert Persons commenced their Jesuit mission to England, Fitzherbert put himself at their service, and helped Campion in the preparation of his Decem Rationes by verifying quotations and copying passages from the fathers in various libraries, to which it would have been impossible for the Jesuit to obtain admission. Unable at last to maintain his position in face of the ever-growing persecution, he left England in 1582, and took up his residence in the north of France. Here, as a lay Catholic of birth, means, and unexceptionable character, he was much trusted by the Catholic leaders. He was active in the cause of Mary, Queen of Scots, and was closely watched by Walsingham's emissaries, whose letters contain frequent insinuations against his ulterior intentions.

His wife died in 1588, and he soon afterwards took a vow of celibacy. He is next found in the household of the young 2nd Duke of Feria, whose mother was Lady Jane Dormer. With him or in his service he lived in Flanders, Spain, Milan, Naples, and Rome for some twenty years, until the Duke died in 1607, on the point of setting out for a diplomatic mission to Germany, on which Fitzherbert was to have accompanied him. It was during this period that he was charged in 1598 by Squire with having tempted him to murder Queen Elizabeth; in 1595 a charge of contradictory implication had been preferred against him to the Spanish Government, namely that he was an agent of Elizabeth. Both charges led to the enhancement of his reputation. A series of 200 letters from the Duke to him is preserved in the archives of the Archdiocese of Westminster.

In 1601, while in Spain, he felt moved to take a vow to offer himself for the priesthood, and he was ordained in Rome 24 March 1602. After this he acted as Roman agent for the archpriest Harrison until he was succeeded, in 1609, by the future bishop, Father Richard Smith. In 1606 he had made a third vow, to enter the Society of Jesus, which he did about the year 1613. He was soon given the important post of superior in Flanders, 1616 to 1618, afterwards recalled and made rector of the English College, Rome, from 1618 to 1639. He died there, closing, at the age of eighty-eight years, a life that had been filled with an unusual variety of duties.

== Principal works ==
- A Defence of the Catholycke Cause, By T.F., with an Apology of his innocence in a fayned conspiracy of Edward Squire (St-Omer, 1602), on the case of Edward Squire.
- A Treatise concerning Policy and Religion (Douai, 1606–10, 1615), translated into Latin in 1630. This work was highly valued for its sound and broad-minded criticism of the lax political principles professed in those days.

He also wrote books in the controversy that grew out of King James's Oath of Allegiance:

- A Supplement to [Father Persons's] the Discussion of M. D. Barlow (St-Omer, 1613)
- A Confutation of certaine Absurdities uttered by M. D. Andrews (St-Omer, 1613)
- Of the Oath of Fidelity (St-Omer, 1614)
- The Obmutesce of F. F. to the Epphata of D. Collins (St-Omer, 1621).
- Life of St. Francis Xavier (Paris, 1632), a translation from Turcellini's
