= Thomas William McDonald =

New Zealand politician (1869–1968)

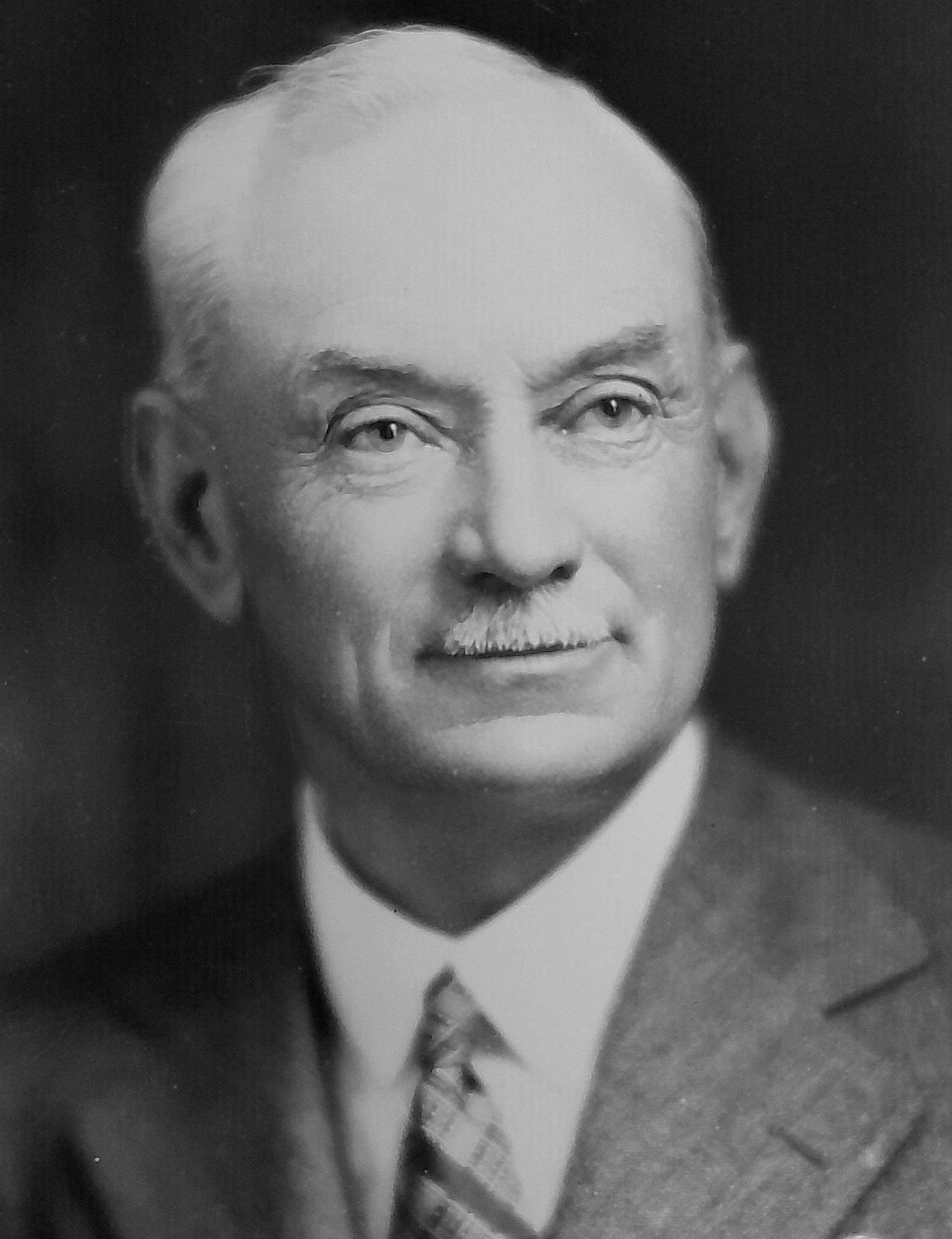

Member of the New Zealand Parliament for Wairarapa
- In office 14 November 1928 – 2 December 1931
- Preceded by: Alex McLeod
- Succeeded by: Alex McLeod

5th Mayor of Lower Hutt
- In office 26 April 1905 – 1 May 1907
- Preceded by: Orton Stevens
- Succeeded by: Thomas Peterkin

Personal details
- Born: December 1869 Tasmania, Australia
- Died: 14 August 1968 (aged 98) Wellington, New Zealand
- Party: United
- Spouse: Amy Gertrude Kimbell (m. 1898)
- Children: 2

Thomas William McDonald (December 1869 – 14 August 1968), sometimes known as Colonel Mac, was a United Party Member of Parliament in New Zealand.

== Biography ==
=== Early life ===
McDonald was born in 1869 in Tasmania. His parents died when he was a child and he had to earn his own living from an early age. Because of this he could not continue to attend school and so was mostly self-educated. He enlisted in the Tasmanian Auxiliary Force and in his early twenties he moved to New Zealand in pursuit of a professional military career. He applied for the New Zealand Permanent Militia and while awaiting his enlistment worked as a bush feller. Once enlisted in the militia he became a third-class gunner. He worked his was up the ranks and became a commissioned officer in the New Zealand Staff Corps.

In 1905 he was elected Mayor of Lower Hutt, defeating former mayor Walter Foster. While he was mayor there was a large fire which caused the loss of a block of shops. At the time Lower Hutt was reliant on neighbouring Petone for firefighting equipment. In an attempt to avoid a repeat incident McDonald and the council purchased a horse drawn fire engine in 1906. He also modernised sewage and water connections in a £52,000 public works scheme which began in August 1906, sewage reticulation had up until this been by buckets emptied by a night cart. He retired as mayor in 1907, succeeded by Thomas Peterkin.

He married Amy Gertrude Kimbell in 1898 and in 1914, they were living in Dunedin's Queen Street. Prior to World War I, he was Lieutenant Colonel and in charge of the Otago Infantry Battalion, which trained at Tahuna Park in Dunedin. During the war, he rose to the rank of colonel, and was sometimes known as Colonel Mac. Having fought in Egypt, he returned to New Zealand before the end of the war due to sickness contracted while in the Sahara desert. After months of recovery in Egypt he was invalided back to New Zealand where he was posted to home defence duties. He was one of the driving forces behind having a clubhouse established in Dunedin for the Returned Services' Association.

=== Member of Parliament ===
New Zealand Parliament
| Years | Term | Electorate | Party |
|---|---|---|---|
| 1928–1931 | 23rd | Wairarapa | United |

The death of Walter Powdrell triggered a by-election in the Patea electorate. McDonald announced his intention to stand for the Reform Party and travelled to Hāwera. The Reform Party chose Edwin Dixon, the Mayor of Hawera, as their official candidate, and it was said that Clutha Mackenzie was the party's second preference. Consequently, McDonald left again without contesting the by-election. During 1922, it became known that McDonald intended to move to Wellington and he received a requisition to stand in the Wellington East electorate in the 1922 election. He was one of four candidates, stood as an independent, and came third with some 18% of the votes. He was unanimously elected by the United Party to contest the Wairarapa electorate in the 1928 election, and he defeated the incumbent Alex McLeod of the Reform Party. In the 1931 election, McLeod in turn defeated McDonald. In 1935 he stood again for the Wairarapa seat as the newly formed Democrat Party's candidate. He placed third out of four candidates.

=== Later life and death ===
In old age he was engaged in a lengthy dispute over his right to superannuation payments owed to him as a former member of parliament. He appeared in person at the Supreme Court at the age of 92 to argue his case, but all of his claims were dismissed.

McDonald died in Wellington in 1968, aged 98. He was predeceased by his wife and son and survived by his daughter and several grandchildren.

== Notes ==
New Zealand Parliament
| Preceded by Alex McLeod | Member of Parliament for Wairarapa; 1928–1931 | Succeeded by Alex McLeod |
Political offices
| Preceded by Orton Stevens | Mayor of Lower Hutt; 1905–1907 | Succeeded by Thomas Peterkin |
