= Eric Rothwell =

New Zealand lawyer and politician

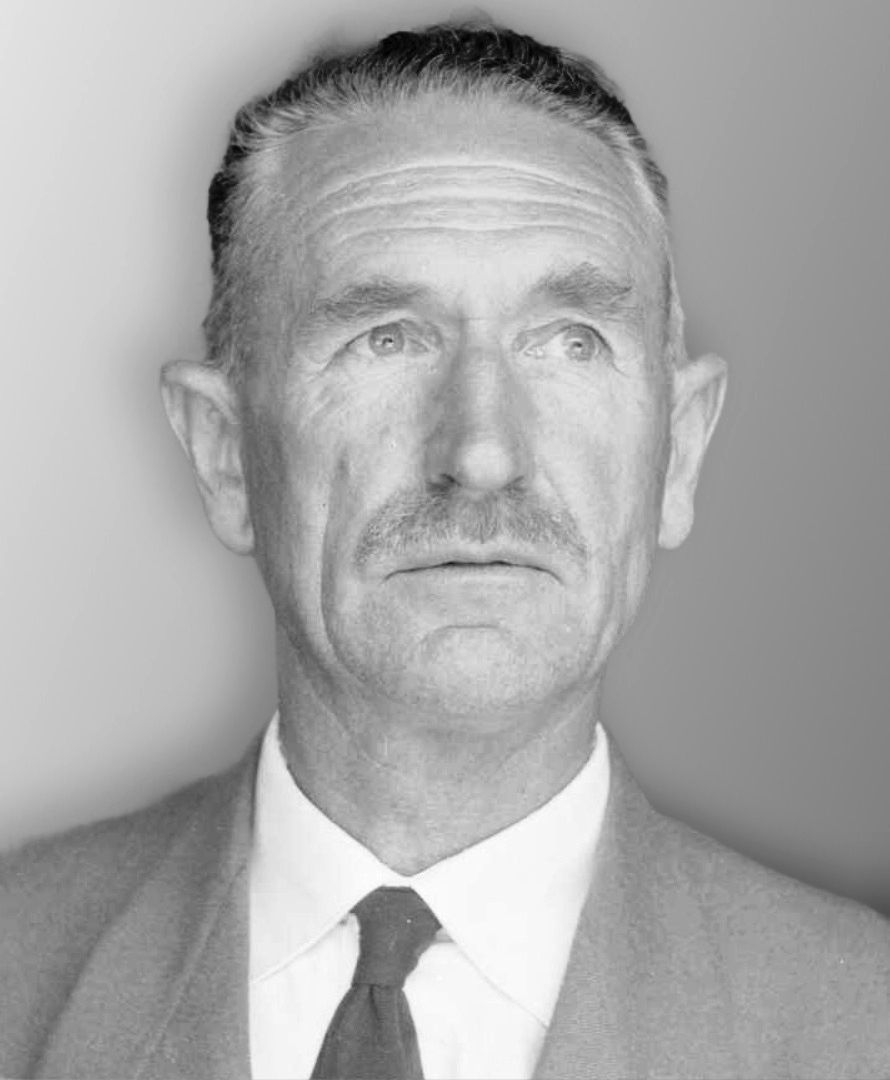
- Rothwell in 1957

Chief Judge of the High Court of Western Samoa
- In office 22 January 1957 – 7 December 1960 Serving with Charles Marsack

7th Deputy Mayor of Lower Hutt
- In office 14 March 1949 – 18 November 1950
- Mayor: William Gregory
- Preceded by: William Gregory
- Succeeded by: Harry Horlor

Member of the Lower Hutt City Council
- In office 27 May 1947 – 18 November 1950
- Constituency: At-large

Personal details
- Born: 31 December 1901 Gisborne, New Zealand
- Died: 17 January 1991 (aged 89) Hamilton, New Zealand
- Spouse: Ada Kitty Mitchell (m. 1929; died 1963)
- Children: 2
- Occupation: Lawyer

Eric Francis Rothwell (31 December 1901 – 17 January 1991) was a New Zealand lawyer and politician who was Chief Judge of the High Court of Western Samoa from 1957 to 1960.

== Biography ==
=== Early life ===
Rothwell was born on 31 December 1901 in Gisborne, New Zealand, to Reverend Benjamin and Henrietta Rothwell. He was educated at Marlborough High School and Nelson College, before attending the University of Otago where he graduated with a Bachelor of Laws degree. He married Ada Kitty Mitchell in 1929, with whom he had one son and one daughter.

=== Legal career ===
In 1927, Rothwell started his own legal office in High Street, Lower Hutt, as a sole practitioner. He gradually took on partners, initially John Stanhope Reid in the 1930s, then Keith Gibson joined in 1945 to become Rothwell, Reid & Gibson. After Reid left the firm to become a diplomat, Wellington lawyer Babe Page joined the firm in his place which then became Rothwell, Gibson & Page, and now operating from both Lower Hutt and Wellington. They were joined by Jack Marshall, a Member of Parliament and later prime minister, whence the firm was then known as Rothwell, Gibson, Page & Marshall. Rothwell left in 1956 after he had been appointed the Chief Judge of the High Court of Western Samoa. His period in Samoa began when judge Charles Croft Marsack was on furlough in New Zealand. Rothwell's position was created in combination with Marsack, who was finding the work as a sole judge of a high court too onerous to be carried out alone.

In 1957, Rothwell was additionally appointed by the government as a stipendiary magistrate and warden. He went on furlough from the High Court in January 1960 when he was appointed to a commission of inquiry to investigate a large fire that occurred in Dunedin in December 1959. In November 1960, he resigned from the High Court of Western Samoa and returned to New Zealand. Upon returning to New Zealand, he served for several months in early 1961 as a relieving magistrate in Auckland before later being appointed to a permanent circuit. In late 1972 he was appointed to the Samoan court again for a temporary three-month term covering for a resignation during a period of high turnover of legal officials.

=== Political career ===
At the 1929 local-body elections he stood for the Lower Hutt Borough Council on the nascent People's Party ticket, but was unsuccessful placing third to last. In 1931 he stood again, this time on the Citizens' Association ticket. He polled far better on this attempt and was the highest polling unsuccessful candidate. Rothwell was chairman of the Hutt Urban Adjustment Committee from 1937 to 1938 and president of the Hutt Valley YMCA in 1946. He was elected a member of the Lower Hutt City Council on his third attempt at the 1944 local-body elections. Re-elected in 1947, he was appointed deputy mayor in 1949 before being defeated in 1950 (alongside all other Citizens' candidates). At the 1953 election, he stood for the mayoralty but was defeated by the incumbent Labour Party mayor Percy Dowse.

Rothwell was president of the Hutt Club from 1951 to 1953 and again from 1954 to 1955, and was president of the Hutt Rotary Club from 1955 to 1956.

In 1953, Rothwell was awarded the Queen Elizabeth II Coronation Medal.

=== Later life and death ===
After retiring as a judge, Rothwell was appointed in February 1975 as chairman of a commission of inquiry into an explosion and fire in Seaview, Lower Hutt, that occurred in September 1974.

Rothwell died on 17 January 1991.

== Notes ==
Political offices
Preceded by William Gregory	Deputy Mayor of Lower Hutt; 1949–50	Succeeded by Harry Horlor
