= Listed buildings in Swynnerton =

Swynnerton is a civil parish in the Borough of Stafford, Staffordshire, England. It contains 62 listed buildings that are recorded in the National Heritage List for England. Of these, two are listed at Grade I, the highest of the three grades, six are at Grade II*, the middle grade, and the others are at Grade II, the lowest grade. The parish contains villages including Swynnerton, Tittensor, Yarnfield, and Hanchurch, and the surrounding area. In the parish is the Trentham Estate, the area around the former Trentham Hall, most of which has been demolished. The remains of the hall, associated structures, and buildings in the garden and surrounding park are listed. Outside the estate, most of the listed buildings are houses and associated structures, cottages, farmhouses and farm buildings, the earlier of which are timber framed. The other listed buildings include churches and a chapel, items in churchyards, a country house and associated structures, buildings associated with a pumping station, bridges, and war memorials.

== Key ==
Grade	Criteria
I	Buildings of exceptional interest, sometimes considered to be internationally important
II*	Particularly important buildings of more than special interest
II	Buildings of national importance and special interest

== Buildings ==
Name and location	Photograph	Date	Notes	Grade
St Mary's Church; 52.91677°N 2.22112°W		12th century	In the 13th century aisles were added and the chancel was rebuilt, the south chapel was added in the following century, and the tower in the 15th century. During the 19th century the church was restored, the clerestory was added, and the roofs were renewed. The church consists of a nave with a clerestory, north and south aisles, a south porch, a chancel with a south chapel, and a west tower. The tower has diagonal buttresses, three stages, clock faces, and a plain parapet with short corner turrets. It contains a Norman west doorway, and an earlier Norman doorway is inside the church.	I
Remains of churchyard cross 52.96561°N 2.20170°W		Late Norman or early medieval	The remains of the cross are in the churchyard of the Church of St Mary and All Saints. They are in stone, and consist of the lower part of the shaft on a circular base on stylobate with three steps.	II
School House, Mayfields and Ivy Cottage, Hanchurch; 52.96867°N 2.22702°W	—	Medieval	A group of three cottages of different ages forming a T-shaped plan, all with tile roofs and two storeys, which have been much altered. The oldest is Mayfield, which originated as a three-bay hall, it is timber framed with cruck construction, rendered at the front, and containing a central cruck truss. Ivy Cottage dates from the early 19th-century, and forms a brick rear wing. School House is a timber framed gabled cross-wing on the left dating from the 17th century.	II
Boundary Cottages and Elton Cottage, Yarnfield; 52.89012°N 2.20304°W	—	Late 15th to early 16th century	A row of timber framed cottages with cruck construction that were extended in the 17th century, and remodelled in the 18th and 19th centuries. They are faced in colour-washed brick and have a tile roof. There is one storey and an attic, and five bays. The windows are casements, and there are two dormers. One gabled end, and the gable of the porch, have curved bargeboards and finials, and there is some exposed timber framing at the east end. Inside there are four cruck trusses.	II
15 and 17 Stone Road, Tittensor; 52.94267°N 2.18892°W		Early 17th century	A pair of cottages with two storeys, the ground floor is in painted brick, and the upper floor is timber framed with brick infill. There are two modern doors, casement windows, two gabled dormers, and No. 17 has a moulded bressumer.	II
The Mews, Hanchurch; 52.96646°N 2.22351°W	centre[	Early 17th century	A barn that has been converted for other uses, it has two storeys, the ground floor being in painted brick, and the upper floor in timber framing and painted brick. The building has a thatched roof and four bays. The windows are casements, and on the right gable end is a weathervane in the form of a gilded cockerel.	II
Village Farmhouse, Hanchurch; 52.96957°N 2.22833°W	—	17th century	The front of the farmhouse is timber framed, the rest is in brick, on a stone plinth, and it has a tile roof. There is one storey and an attic, a front of three bays, and a later brick rear wing. The windows are casements, and those in the attic are gabled.	II
The Thatched Cottage, Swynnerton; 52.91827°N 2.22188°W	—	17th century (probable)	The cottage is partly in stone and partly in brick, and has a thatched roof. There are two storeys and three bays. The windows are casements, and the thatch sweeps over the upper floor windows.	II
Barn, Yew Tree Farm, Yarnfield; 52.88926°N 2.20365°W		17th century	The former barn is timber framed with infill and refacing in brick, and a tile roof. There is one storey and a loft, and seven bays. (Note: Street View in July 2011 shows that the barn has been converted for residential use.)	II
Gate piers and railings north of the church, Trentham Estate; 52.96608°N 2.20203°W	—	Early 18th century	There are two pairs of gate piers with decorative iron railings between them. The outer piers are earlier, and are in stone with moulded caps and ball finials. The inner piers date from the 19th century and are in cast iron with panelled sides, dentilled cornices and ball finials.	II
Swynnerton Hall; 52.91623°N 2.22134°W		1725–29	A country house designed by Francis Smith of Warwick, with alterations in about 1810 by James Trubshaw. It is built in stone with quoins and a hipped roof. There are three storeys, a front of nine bays, sides of five bays, and a later three-storey brick wing on the right. On the front the middle three bays project between giant Tuscan pilasters, and in the centre is a doorway with a rusticated surround, Ionic columns, a bolection frieze, and a plain parapet with urn finials. The windows are sashes with moulded architraves, those in the ground floor also with pediments and in the middle floor with keystones.	I
Dixons and outbuildings, Swynnerton Hall; 52.91655°N 2.22072°W	—	18th century	A range of outbuildings, partly converted for residential use, they are in red brick with tile roofs, and have one or two storeys. They include a segmental-headed carriage arch, casement windows, and pitching holes. There is also an octagonal garden house with quoins and a pyramidal roof, a three-storey bay, formerly a dovecote, and a single-storey stone barn.	II
The Old Post Office, Swynnerton; 52.91849°N 2.22170°W	—	18th century (probable)	The house is in red brick and has a thatched roof. There are two storeys and three bays. The windows are casements, and the thatch sweeps over the upper floor windows.	II
Bridge northwest of the church, Trentham Estate; 52.96591°N 2.20387°W		18th century	The bridge carries the main approach road to Trentham Hall over Park Brook. It is in stone and consists of a single rusticated arch. The bridge has broad bands above the keystones, solid parapets with curved coping and central rectangular piers surmounted by wrought iron standards. At the junction of the abutments and the bridge are circular piers surmounted by shallow domes.	II
Bridge over the River Trent, Trentham Estate; 52.96619°N 2.20017°W	—	18th century	The bridge carries a road over the River Trent. It is in stone, and consists of three segmental arches. The bridge has cutwaters on both sides, and a plain parapet.	II
Barn, Village Farm, Hanchurch; 52.96953°N 2.22798°W	—	18th century	The barn is in brick with a tile roof and has two storeys. The walls contain numerous pigeon holes, and in the south gable end are circular openings.	II
Queenswood, Swynnerton; 52.91776°N 2.21943°W	—	1760	A rectory, later a private house, it is in red brick on a stone plinth, with a string course, a modillion eaves cornice, and a tile roof. There are two storeys and an attic, two parallel ranges, and a front of five bays. The doorway has a moulded stuccoed architrave and a pediment, the windows on the front are sashes, and elsewhere they are casements.	II
Bridge at SJ 851384; 52.94251°N 2.22389°W	—	Mid to late 18th century	The bridge, which carries the A519 road over Beechdale Lane, is in sandstone, and is lined with red brick. It consists of a single semicircular arch with voussoirs. The bridge has a band course, and a plain parapet with flat copings. The abutments are splayed, and end in pilasters.	II
Monument Lodges, Gate Piers And Screen, Trentham Gardens; 52.95003°N 2.19839°W	—	c. 1775	The buildings were designed by Joseph Pickford in Palladian style, and were extended in the 19th century. The lodges are in stone with slate roofs, and the extensions are in brick with roofs of slate or tile. Each lodge has a dentilled pediment, and a round-arched recess containing a sash window over which is a blind oculus. Between the lodges are screen walls and gate piers, each containing a niche, a string course with panel above, and a moulded cap. In the extensions are casement windows.	II
Peacock Houses, Trentham Estate; 52.96673°N 2.20120°W	—	c. 1800	Estate houses, originally an aviary and keeper's house, later converted for residential use. In the centre is a semicircular carriage arch. This is flanked by single-storey wings containing casement windows, and at the end is a three-storey bay.	II
Entrance Lodges, Screen and Gates, Trentham Gardens; 52.96626°N 2.19875°W		1803–13	The two lodges, designed by Charles Heathcote Tatham, are in rusticated stone, and have a square plan. Each lodge has a chamfered plinth, a base, and a round-headed window with a keystone on each side. Above these is a string course, a square pier on a base of three steps, with a further three steps on the top. Between the lodges are railings and later gates.	II
The Grand Entrance and conservatory, Trentham Hall; 52.96517°N 2.20250°W		1808	The remains consist of the orangery designed by Charles Heathcote Tatham, and the later grand entrance by Sir Charles Barry. They are in stone and plastered brick, and in Italianate style. The structure consists of a single-storey arcade with unfluted Ionic columns between the bays, over which is a cornice and a balustrade. At the centre it has a semicircular plan, with side wings, and on the right side is the orangery. In the middle is a porte-cochère with coats of arms over three ached entrances.	II*
1–4 Park Drive, Trentham Estate; 52.96627°N 2.19931°W	—	Early 19th century	A row of estate cottages, they are in cottage orné style, and in painted brick with tile roofs. They have one storey and gabled attics, and at each end is a gabled bay. The windows are casements with keystones, some with hood moulds. There is one gabled porch, and four gabled dormers, and the gables have finials.	II
6–10 Park Drive, outbuildings and laundry house Trentham Estate; 52.96632°N 2.20184°W		Early 19th century	The buildings are in painted brick with stone dressings and tile roofs. They have two storeys, and form three ranges around a yard. The range facing the road is symmetrical, and has a central carriage arch with a rusticated surround, and above it is a lantern with a pyramidal roof and a wind vane. The windows are casements, and the doorways have moulded architraves with rectangular fanlights and small cornice hoods. Each of the rear wings has a central carriage arch.	II
14 and 15 Park Drive, Trentham Estate; 52.96833°N 2.20375°W	—	Early 19th century	A pair of cottages in cottage orné style, in painted brick with projecting eaves and slate roofs. There are two projecting bays with hipped roofs, two bays between them, and two bays flanking them on each side. In the centre the roof projects and is carried on wooden columns.	II
Bridge south of Club House, Trentham Estate; 52.96765°N 2.21039°W		Early 19th century	The bridge, which crosses Park Brook, is in stone and brick. It consists of a single segmental arch and has balustraded parapets.	II
Former Smithy, Trentham Estate; 52.96731°N 2.20245°W	—	Early 19th century	The former smithy has a roughly triangular plan, with brick walls on a stone base with rusticated piers. The entrance is angled and in the form of a horseshoe with a rusticated surround, massive buttresses, and a cornice surmounted by a bowl with a metal flaming torch.	II
Garden House north of Peacock Houses, Trentham Estate; 52.96732°N 2.20133°W	—	Early 19th century	The building in the garden is in stone, and is square with angle quoins, and a pyramidal tiled roof with a stone finial. It contains a doorway with an architrave.	II
Garden House south of Peacock Houses, Trentham Estate; 52.96644°N 2.20059°W	—	Early 19th century	The building garden is in stone, and is square with angle quoins, and a pyramidal tiled roof with a stone finial. It contains a doorway with an architrave.	II
Gate piers, Gravel Pit Lodge, Hanchurch; 52.96362°N 2.22252°W	—	Early 19th century (probable)	The gate piers are at a former entrance to the Trentham Estate. They are in stone and have moulded cornice caps and ball finials.	II
Home Farmhouse; 52.91845°N 2.22102°W	—	Early 19th century	The farmhouse, later a private house, is roughcast over timber framing, and has corbelled eaves and a tile roof. There are two storeys and an L-shaped plan, consisting of a main range, a gabled cross-wing on the left, and a rear wing. On the front is a gabled porch, and the windows are casements. Inside, there is exposed timber framing with wattle and daub infill.	II
Manor Cottages, Hanchurch; 52.96642°N 2.22433°W	—	Early 19th century	A pair of cottages in Tudor style, in painted brick with dentilled eaves, and tile roofs. There are two storeys and attics, and a projecting gabled wing on the left. The windows are cast iron casements with lozenge-pattern glazing and hood molds, and there are three stone-coped gabled dormers with obelisk finials.	II
Manor House, Hanchurch; 52.96665°N 2.22393°W		Early 19th century	The house, which probably has a 17th-century core, is in painted brick with a tile roof, and in Tudor style. There are two storeys, and the plan consists of a three-bay middle range flanked by projecting gabled wings. In the centre is a gabled stone porch and a doorway with a four-centred arched head. The windows are mullioned with gables above the upper floor windows. All the gables have finials.	II
Outbuildings northeast of Meece House; 52.89100°N 2.21978°W	—	Early 19th century	The buildings are in red brick with rendering, dentilled eaves, and slate roofs. They have one storey and form three blocks, one with its gable end towards the road. The buildings contain casement windows, pitching eyes, and various doorways.	II
Swynnerton Heath Farmhouse; 52.92860°N 2.23596°W	—	Early 19th century	A red brick farmhouse with a modillion eaves cornice and a tile roof. There are three storeys, and an L-shaped plan, with a front range of five bays, and a lower rear wing. The porch has pilasters and a pediment, there is a canted bay window with a slate roof to the right, and the other windows are sashes.	II
Flower Garden Walls, Trentham Gardens; 52.96455°N 2.20142°W	—	1833–42	The walls, which surround the flower garden on its east, west, and north sides were designed by Sir Charles Barry. They are in limestone, and are low walls with moulded tops and bases, and contain squat square pillars with panelled sides. In the middle of the east and west walls are semicircular seats, and in the middle of the north wall is a flight of steps.	II
Garden pavilion, Trentham Gardens; 52.96424°N 2.20297°W	ceentre	1833–42	The pavilion, which stands at the northeast corner of the parterre garden was designed by Sir Charles Barry in Classical style. It is in limestone and has a rectangular plan with three bays. On the front are arches with moulded architraves, Corinthian columns, and a moulded entablature containing discs. At the top is a dentilled cornice, a parapet and a finial above each column. At the rear, steps lead down to a semicircular stone seat with flanking screen walls.	II
Orangery, sculpture gallery and clock tower, Trentham Hall; 52.96515°N 2.20083°W		1833–42	The service block was designed by Sir Charles Barry in Italianate style. It is in plastered brick and stone, and has two storeys and an L-shaped plan. On the south side is a colonnade of twelve arches, above which are sash windows and a balustrade, and at the right end is a square pavilion. On the north side is a colonnade of Ionic columns and a tall campanile with a clock and a ball finial.	II
Former stable block, Trentham Hall; 52.96593°N 2.20089°W	—	1833–4	The stable block was designed by Sir Charles Barry, and is stuccoed, with bracketed eaves and a slate roof. There are two storeys, and an L-shaped plan, with two ranges at right angles on two sides of a yard. The block contains casement windows with architraves, and on the east side is a semicircular-headed carriage arch. At the northwest corner is a square bay with a pyramidal roof.	II
Wall, balustrade, and steps, Trentham Gardens; 52.96436°N 2.20209°W	—	1833–42	The structures were designed by Sir Charles Barry, and are in limestone. The wall runs between the flower garden and the north side of the parterre garden, and in the middle is a flight of steps. The wall is low with a moulded base and rails, it contains squat square pillars topped with vases, and is surmounted by a bottle balustrade.	II
Wall, balustrade, steps and boathouse, Trentham Gardens; 52.96247°N 2.20127°W	—	1833–42	The structures were designed by Sir Charles Barry, and are mainly in limestone. The wall runs along the south of the parterre garden, with semicircular steps in the centre, a short return wall at the west, and a return wall at the east with a semicircular projection over the boathouse. Above the wall is a vase balustrade with squat square pillars surmounted by urns, and at the angles are square piers with moulded caps. At the opening to the boathouse is a wide segmental arch with a keystone and metal gates.	II
Sutherland Monument; 52.94688°N 2.19654°W		1836	The monument in Trentham Gardens is to the 1st Duke of Sutherland, and is by Francis Leggatt Chantrey. It stands on the top of a hill, and is in limestone. The monument depicts the duke standing on tall tapering column on a square pedestal with chamfered corners to the dado, on a four-step plinth. On the north face of the dado is an inscribed plaque.	II*
The Duchess Cottage, Trentham Gardens; 52.96566°N 2.19822°W	—	c. 1841	In cottage orné style, this is built in brick, it is rendered and painted to resemble timber framing. The cottage has a chamfered plinth and a tile roof. There is one storey and an attic, and a cruciform plan, with a projecting porch at the front, and a projecting bay at the rear. Steps lead up to the porch, which has a gable, decorative eaves and a pinnacle. The windows are casements.	II
Church of St Mary and All Saints, Trentham Gardens; 52.96540°N 2.20184°W		1844	The church was designed by Sir Charles Barry in Perpendicular style. It is built in stone, and consists of a nave, aisles and a chancel in one unit, and incorporates earlier material internally, including Norman arcades.	II*
Arbour Trellis, Trentham Gardens; 52.96346°N 2.20051°W		1840s	The trellis runs parallel to the east side of the parterre garden. It is in cast and wrought iron on low stone plinths, and consists of a series of round arches forming a tunnel walkway.	II
Ice House, Trentham Estate; 52.96760°N 2.20356°W	—	1840s	The ice house is in brick, and has a stone entrance. The doorway has a cambered arch, and it leads to a brick-lined passage with a cambered brick vault. The chamber has an ovoid shape, and has a cavity wall.	II
Perseus with the Head of Medusa, Trentham Gardens; 52.96246°N 2.20166°W		Mid 19th century	The statue is a bronze cast of Perseus with the Head of Medusa by Benvenuto Cellini. It stands on a square sandstone pedestal, and there are inscribed plaques on the dados of the plinth. The plinth is on a circular platform, and it is surrounded by four low columns surmounted by urns.	II*
Gravel Pit Lodge, Hanchurch; 52.96371°N 2.22243°W	—	1859	The house has two storeys, the ground floor is in stone, the upper floor has applied timber framing and plaster, and the roof is gabled and tiled. On the south side is a mullioned canted bay window above which is an overhanging oriel window. The doorway is at the rear, and on the west side is a massive chimney, the lower part in stone and the upper part in brick.	II
4 Northwood Cottages; 52.97988°N 2.21840°W	—	c. 1860 (probable)	The cottage is built in whitewashed massed concrete, and has a tile roof. There is one storey and an attic, with a gabled cross-wing on the left, and a later single-storey extension further to the left. In the centre is a porch, and the windows are casements.	II
Drayton Road Cottages; 52.95899°N 2.23163°W	—	c. 1860	A pair of estate cottages designed by George Devey. They are built in a combination of red brick, stone, plaster, tile-hanging, and timber framing, and have tile roofs and gables with bargeboards. There is one storey and attics, and an L-shaped plan, with a gabled cross-wing on the right and a single-storey service wing to the rear on the left. On the right is a large timber framed gable with a jettied upper storey containing a seven-light window in the ground floor and a five-light window above. To its left is an open porch with a gabled canopy on timber posts, and further to the left is a window with a cambered head and a gabled dormer above. All the windows are casements.	II
Burne House and Burne Cottage, Tittensor; 52.94196°N 2.18837°W	—	1861	A pair of estate cottages designed by George Devey, they are built in a combination of brick, stone, tile-hanging, and timber framing, and have tile roofs and gables of different sizes. There are two storeys and the front has five irregular bays. The windows are mullioned casements. On the left side is a jettied gable with a carved bressumer.	II
Chapel of Our Lady of the Assumption; 52.91643°N 2.22203°W		1868–69	The Roman Catholic chapel was designed by Gilbert Blount in Gothic style, and is in stone with a tile roof. It consists of a nave, a south arcade, and a chancel with a chapel. On the north gable is a bellcote. The interior is richly decorated and includes a west gallery.	II*
The Dairy House and Dairy; 52.96702°N 2.20419°W	—	Late 19th century	The house is timber framed with plastered panels on a brick plinth, and has a gabled tile roof with bargeboards, finials and pendants. There are two storeys and an irregular plan, with a small central bay, large projecting gabled cross-wings, and further ranges at the rear. The upper storeys of the cross-wings are jettied, there is a bay window in the right cross-wing, an oriel window on carved console brackets in each upper floor, and in the middle bay is a half-dormer. The porch in the right return has low balustrades on each side, and a gabled canopy on consoles with a finial and a pendant. A covered way on the right leads to the dairy, which is timber framed and has an octagonal plan and a lantern on the apex of the roof.	II
Hatton Water Pumping Station and Chimney; 52.93006°N 2.25529°W		1890	Engine houses were added to the pumping station in 1898 and 1907. The buildings are in yellow polychromatic brick, with dressings in stone, red brick and terracotta, they have hipped slate roofs, and are in Italianate style. The central building has a tall belvedere. The chimney has an octagonal section, a plinth and a terracotta cap.	II*
Hatton Water Pumping Station: Boiler House and Chimney; 52.92983°N 2.25525°W	—	c. 1890	The boiler house is in yellow brick on a stone base, and has dressings in red brick and stone. There is one storey, the windows are arched, and the ends are gabled. Against the south gable is a brick octagonal chimney.	II
Hatton Water Pumping Station: Secondary Pump House; 52.93006°N 2.25496°W	—	c. 1890	The pumping station is in yellow brick on a stone base, and has dressings in red brick and stone, rusticated piers, and a stone coped parapet.. There is one storey, steps lead up to doorways with fanlights, and the windows are tall with semicircular heads.	II
Water Tower, Swynnerton; 52.91685°N 2.23290°W		c. 1890	The water tower is in red and yellow brick, and has a square plan. On each side is a semicircular arch with a keyblock. On the top the tank chamber has a three-light oriel window on each side, and a parapet above.	II
Gate piers and wall, Swynnerton Hall; 52.91645°N 2.22148°W	—	c. 1890	The wall encloses the forecourt of the hall. It is in stone with moulded coping, and the gate piers are plain.	II
Hargreaves Lodge; 52.97308°N 2.21774°W	—	1896	A former lodge to the Trentham Estate, it is in applied timber framing and plaster, with sprocket eaves, and a tile roof. There is one storey and an attic, and an L-shaped plan, with a front of two bays. On the left is a projecting gabled bay, and the right bay contains a gabled dormer. The windows are casements, and the gables have decorative bargeboards and ornamental finials.	II
War memorial, Coldmeece; 52.89299°N 2.21600°W	—	c. 1920	The war memorial, which stands in an island in a road, was erected by the parents of a soldier killed in the First World War. It is in stone, and consists of a Celtic wheel-head cross with interlace patterns on the face of the shaft. The shaft is on a plinth on a base of two steps, and on the front is an inscription.	II
War memorial, Swynnerton; 52.91667°N 2.22213°W		c. 1920	The war memorial stands on a road junction. It is in stone, and consists of an elaborately carved cross on a tapering shaft, on an octagonal base of four steps.	II
War memorial, Tittensor; 52.94360°N 2.18976°W	—	c. 1920	The war memorial stands on a road junction on an area paved with York stone. It is in stone and consists of a rectangular tapering pylon about 2 metres (6 ft 7 in) high. It has a two-stepped base and a low pyramidal cap. On the east face is a wreath carved in relief, an inscription, and the names of those lost in the First World War, and on the east face is an inscription and the names of those lost in the Second World War.	II

== Notes and references ==
=== Sources ===
- Historic England, "Church of St Mary, Swynnerton (1374205)", National Heritage List for England
- Historic England, "Remains of cross in churchyard of Church of St Mary and All Saints, Swynnerton (1038986)", National Heritage List for England
- Historic England, "Ivy Cottage, Mayfields and School House, Swynnerton (1038989)", National Heritage List for England
- Historic England, "Boundary Cottages Elton Cottage, Swynnerton (1240251)", National Heritage List for England
- Historic England, "Nos. 15 and 17 Stone Road, Swynnerton (1038990)", National Heritage List for England
- Historic England, "The Mews, Swynnerton (1190177)", National Heritage List for England
- Historic England, "Village Farmhouse, Swynnerton (1190184)", National Heritage List for England
- Historic England, "The Thatched Cottage, Swynnerton (1374207)", National Heritage List for England
- Historic England, "Converted timber framed barn at Yew Tree Farm, Swynnerton (1374228)", National Heritage List for England
- Historic England, "Two pairs of Gate-piers and Railings North Church of St Mary and All Saints, Swynnerton (1272559)", National Heritage List for England
- Historic England, "Swynnerton Hall, Swynnerton (1038991)", National Heritage List for England
- Historic England, "Dixons and adjoining range of outbuildings to north-east of Swynnerton Hall, Swynnerton (1190315)", National Heritage List for England
- Historic England, "The Old Post Office, Swynnerton (1374225)", National Heritage List for England
- Historic England, "Bridge north-west of the Church of St Mary And All Saints, Trentham Gardens, Swynnerton (1190273)", National Heritage List for England
- Historic England, "Bridge 150 yards to north-east of Church of St Mary and All Saints, Swynnerton (1038985)", National Heritage List for England
- Historic England, "Barn to east of Village Farmhouse, Swynnerton (1374203)", National Heritage List for England
- Historic England, "Queenswood, Swynnerton (1190329)", National Heritage List for England
- Historic England, "Bridge at SJ 851384, Swynnerton (1038960)", National Heritage List for England
- Historic England, "Monument Lodges, Gate Piers And Screen, Trentham Gardens, Swynnerton (1244070)", National Heritage List for England
- Historic England, "Peacock Houses, Swynnerton (1293934)", National Heritage List for England
- Historic England, "Entrance Lodges, Screen and Gates at Trentham Gardens, Swynnerton (1190305)", National Heritage List for England
- Historic England, "Remains of Trentham Hall: The Grand Entrance and conservatory, Swynnerton (1190243)", National Heritage List for England
- Historic England, "Nos. 1–4 Park Drive, Swynnerton (1038982)", National Heritage List for England
- Historic England, "Nos. 6 to 10 Park Drive (consecutively) with outbuildings of Trentham Estate, together with Laundry House (Nos 1 to 3 consecutively), Swynnerton (1038983)", National Heritage List for England
- Historic England, "Nos. 14 and 15 Park Drive, Swynnerton (1293902)", National Heritage List for England
- Historic England, "Bridge 75 yards south of Club House (Trentham Park Golf Club), Swynnerton (1038954)", National Heritage List for England
- Historic England, "Former Smithy of Trentham Park Estate, Swynnerton (1038984)", National Heritage List for England
- Historic England, "Garden house 75 yards to north of No. 5 Park Drive and Peacock Houses (Nos. 1, 2 and 3), Swynnerton (1038988)", National Heritage List for England
- Historic England, "Garden house 75 yards to south of No. 5 Park Drive and Peacock Houses (Nos. 1, 2 and 3), Swynnerton (1374204)", National Heritage List for England
- Historic England, "Gate piers adjoining Gravel Pit Lodge, Swynnerton (1190171)", National Heritage List for England
- Historic England, "Home Farmhouse, Swynnerton (1038950)", National Heritage List for England
- Historic England, "Manor Cottages, Swynnerton (1038981)", National Heritage List for England
- Historic England, "Manor House, Swynnerton (1374202)", National Heritage List for England
- Historic England, "Range of outbuildings adjoining north-east side of Meece House, Swynnerton (1188028)", National Heritage List for England
- Historic England, "Swynnerton Heath Farmhouse, Swynnerton (1190189)", National Heritage List for England
- Historic England, "Flower Garden Walls at Trentham Gardens, Swynnerton (1244084)", National Heritage List for England
- Historic England, "Garden Pavilion at Trentham Gardens, Swynnerton (1038953)", National Heritage List for England
- Historic England, "Remains of Trentham Hall: Orangery, sculpture gallery and clock tower, Swynnerton (1038987)", National Heritage List for England
- Historic England, "Remains of Trentham Hall: Former stable block and service quarters, Swynnerton (1293887)", National Heritage List for England
- Historic England, "Retaining wall, balustrade and steps between the flower and parterre gardens, Trentham Gardens, Swynnerton (1244085)", National Heritage List for England
- Historic England, "Retaining wall, balustrade, steps and boathouse, Trentham Gardens, Swynnerton (1244071)", National Heritage List for England
- Historic England, "Sutherland Monument, Trentham Gardens, Swynnerton (1038951)", National Heritage List for England
- Historic England, "The Duchess Cottage, Trentham Gardens, Swynnerton (1374227)", National Heritage List for England
- Historic England, "Church of St Mary and All Saints, Swynnerton (1190214)", National Heritage List for England
- Historic England, "Arbour Trellis at Trentham Gardens, Swynnerton (1244081)", National Heritage List for England
- Historic England, "Ice-house, Swynnerton (1244072)", National Heritage List for England
- Historic England, "Perseus with the Head of Medusa, Trentham Gardens, Swynnerton (1374226)", National Heritage List for England
- Historic England, "Gravel Pit Lodge, Swynnerton (1038980)", National Heritage List for England
- Historic England, "No. 4 Northwood Cottages, Swynnerton (1038959)", National Heritage List for England
- Historic England, "Drayton Road Cottages, Swynnerton (1272556)", National Heritage List for England
- Historic England, "Burne House and Burne Cottage, Swynnerton (1391513)", National Heritage List for England
- Historic England, "Chapel of Our Lady of the Assumption, Swynnerton (1190309)", National Heritage List for England
- Historic England, "The Dairy House and Dairy, Swynnerton (1272555)", National Heritage List for England
- Historic England, "Hatton Water Pumping Station and Chimney, Swynnerton (1374201)", National Heritage List for England
- Historic England, "Water Pumping Station: Boiler House and Chimney, Swynnerton (1038979)", National Heritage List for England
- Historic England, "Water Pumping Station: Secondary Pump House, Swynnerton (1190168)", National Heritage List for England
- Historic England, "Water Tower 1/2 mile to north of Swynnerton Village, Swynnerton (1190297)", National Heritage List for England
- Historic England, "Gate piers and forecourt wall of Swynnerton Hall, Swynnerton (1374206)", National Heritage List for England
- Historic England, "Hargreaves Lodge, Swynnerton (1190361)", National Heritage List for England
- Historic England, "Coldmeece War Memorial, Swynnerton (1432765)", National Heritage List for England
- Historic England, "War Memorial, Swynnerton (1038992)", National Heritage List for England
- Historic England, "Tittensor War Memorial, Swynnerton (1432729)", National Heritage List for England
- Historic England, Listed Buildings
- Pevsner, Nikolaus (1974), Staffordshire, The Buildings of England, Harmondsworth: Penguin Books, ISBN 0-14-071046-9
