= Yarnfield =

Village in Staffordshire, England

Coordinates: 52.891°N 2.201°W

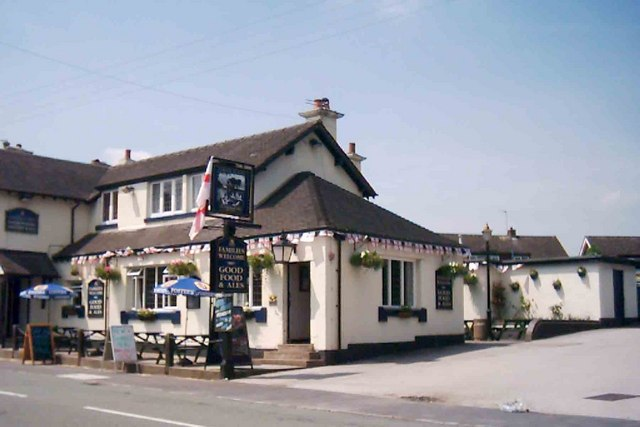
The Labour in Vain

Yarnfield is a village in Staffordshire, England. Population details as taken in the 2011 census can be found under Swynnerton It is considered part of historic Stone, and is near to other historic locations such as Eccleshall and Swynnerton.

Yarnfield and Cold Meece civil parish and parish council came into being in April 2019, with two wards, Yarnfield and Cold Meece. It is included in the Borough of Stafford, and was previously the southern part of Swynnerton parish.

The village has performed very well in the Staffordshire Best Kept Village competition in recent years.

== Yarnfield Park ==
It is the site of a large training and conference centre, Yarnfield Park, originally established using three of the seven hostels built to serve the vast Second World War Swynnerton munitions factory. Of the other hostel sites, Raleigh Hall is now an industrial estate, previously having housed Ugandan Asian refugees thrown out of Uganda by Idi Amin in 1972; Drake Hall is a women's prison; Nelson Hall and Frobisher Hall have been replaced with housing estates, as has Duncan Hall, one of the three camps which formed the training centre later developed as Yarnfield Park.

The General Post Office (GPO) Engineering Department Central Training School opened in Yarnfield in 1946. It occupied buildings at Howard Hall, Duncan Hall and Beatty Hall, which had all acted as transit camps for United States Air Force personnel during the Second World War. These sites were adjacent to each other in the village of Yarnfield. Many teaching staff and their families were initially housed at Raleigh Hall, some miles away. The GPO became the Post Office Corporation in October 1969, and in October 1981 Post Office Telephones became British Telecom. The training centre had a further change of name in 2002 when it became part of Accenture. It remained a British Telecom training centre until the summer of 2010, after which it became a commercial conference and training centre with over 40 event spaces and 338 bedrooms.

The centre is now privately owned and is known as Yarnfield Park Training & Conference Centre.

== Education ==
Springfields First School in Yarnfield received an Outstanding rating from Ofsted in November 2009.

== Public transport ==
Bus services are limited and at most run hourly during daytime and not in evenings. The most regular service is provided by D&G (bus route 14). This runs from Hanley, Stoke, via Barlaston, Stone, Swynnerton, to Yarnfield, and then via Eccleshall to Stafford.

== See also ==
- Listed buildings in Swynnerton
