= Edmund Percy Bunny =

New Zealand politician

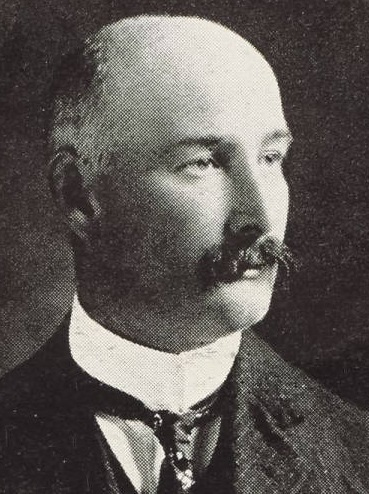

3rd Mayor of Lower Hutt
- In office 6 May 1909 – 7 May 1914
- Preceded by: Thomas Peterkin
- Succeeded by: Henry Baldwin
- In office 5 March 1900 – 24 April 1901
- Preceded by: Walter George Foster
- Succeeded by: Orton Stevens

Personal details
- Born: 1863 or 1864 Wellington, New Zealand
- Died: 8 April 1941 Wellington, New Zealand
- Relations: Henry Bunny (father)
- Children: 4
- Profession: Lawyer

Edmund Percy Bunny (1863 or 1864–8 April 1941) was a New Zealand politician. He was Mayor of Lower Hutt on two occasions.

== Biography ==
Bunny was born in Wellington, a son of administrator and politician Henry Bunny. He attended both Nelson College and Wellington College before studying at Canterbury University graduating with a Bachelor of Arts. At university he played rugby for the university team and took part in the first match against the Otago University team, retaining an interest in rugby and other sports all his life. He taught at Wellington College before practicing law in Wellington in 1889. He was admitted to the bar and served as a barrister. He became involved in the protection of the Hutt River and was involved in the establishment of the Hutt River Board.

In 1898 he was elected to the Lower Hutt Borough Council. In 1900 he was elected mayor of Lower Hutt unopposed after the resignation of Walter George Foster. In his year as mayor he coordinated the efforts to rebuild the main bridge over the Hutt River. He also passed the first building regulations and by-laws to control new constructions in the borough. He served for one year before he was defeated by Orton Stevens. In 1909 he was elected for a second spell as mayor. The councils in-between had spent heavily on upgrading infrastructure and ran out of money for any further expenditure. Bunny's new council (all but one member of the previous council had been voted out) presided over a period of financial austerity to cut costs and both raised rates and borrowed a £10,000 loan to repay debts.

He died in 1941 aged 77, survived by his wife and three daughters. His son was killed during World War I.

== Notes ==
Political offices
Preceded by Walter George Foster	Mayor of Lower Hutt; 1900–1901 1909-1914	Succeeded by Orton Stevens
Preceded by Thomas Peterkin	Mayor of Lower Hutt; 1900–1901 1909-1914	Succeeded by Henry Baldwin
