= George William von Zedlitz =

Professor of modern languages (1871–1949)

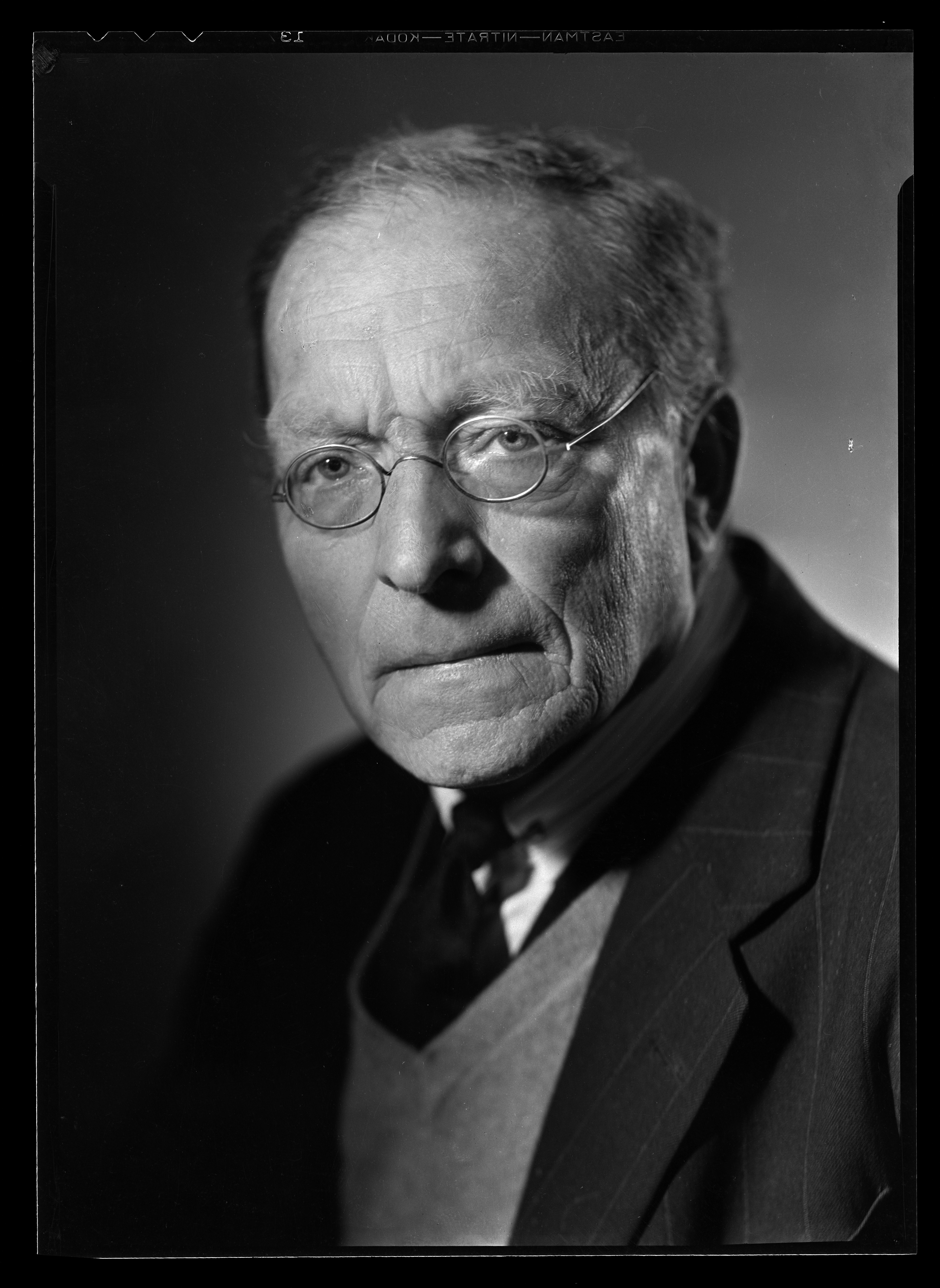
- Professor George Von Zedlitz, C1934, Wellington, by Spencer Digby Studios. Spencer Digby / Ronald D Woolf Collection. Gift of Ronald Woolf, 1975. Te Papa (B.082137)
- Born: 10 March 1871; Herrmannswaldau, German Empire
- Died: 24 May 1949 (aged 78); Wellington, New Zealand
- Occupation: Professor

George William Edward Ernest von Zedlitz (10 March 1871– 24 May 1949) was a New Zealand professor of modern languages.

== Background ==
Von Zedlitz was born in 1871 at Herrmannswaldau, which at the time was located in Germany. His mother was an Englishwoman and he was raised principally in England. His father was Sigismund Freiherr von Zedlitz and Neukirch (1838–1903).

On 4 January 1905 he married Alice Maud Fitzgerald the eldest daughter of Lower Hutt mayor William Alfred Fitzherbert, who built a house Norbury in Lower Hutt (now Minoh Friendship House) for them.

== Academic career ==
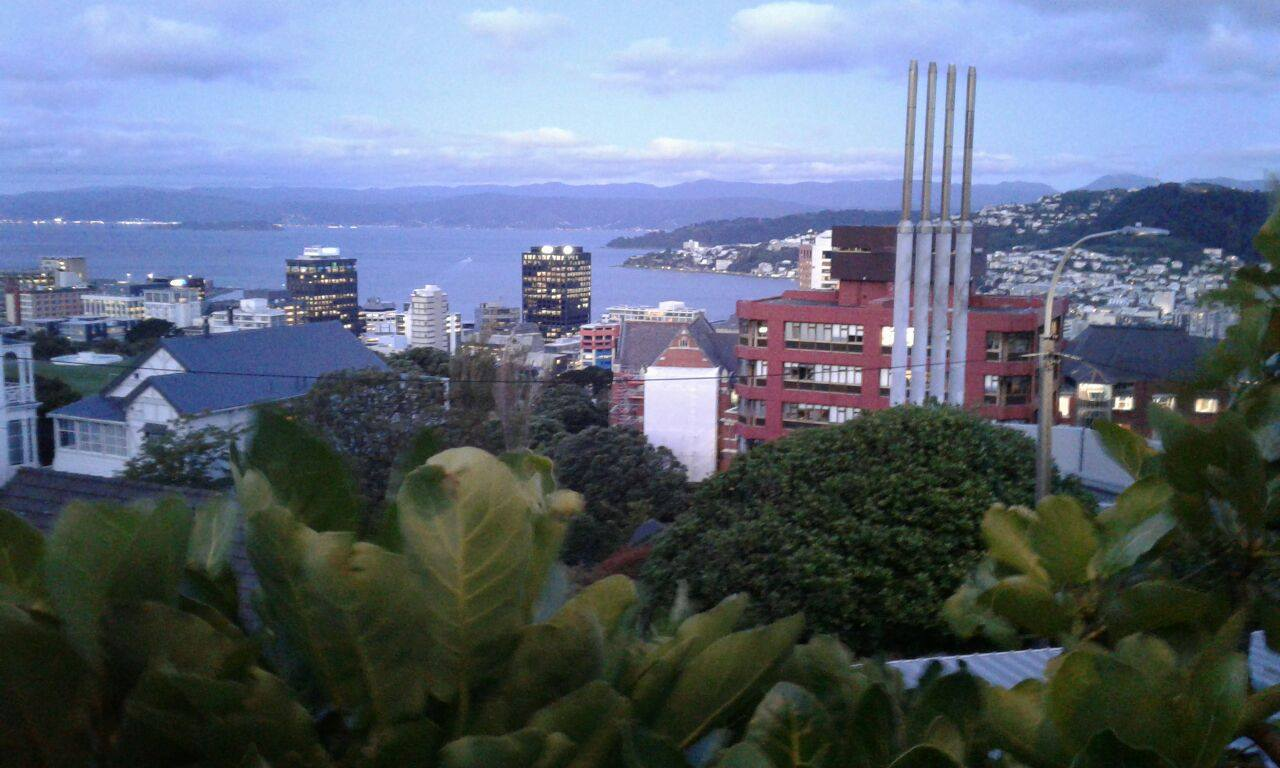
The top of the von Zedlitz building, the red-coloured tower block on Victoria University of Wellington's Kelburn campus, looking towards part of Wellington's CBD and harbour.

In 1902, von Zedlitz was appointed as a professor of modern languages at Victoria University College, and was the fifth professor to join the college. He also served as an official government translator. Following the outbreak of the First World War the New Zealand Government requested to have him dismissed from his post, a request that was rebuffed by the university. The subsequent passing of the Alien Enemy Teachers Act 1915 enabled the Government to overrule the university.

In 1936 he was made professor emeritus, and elected to the Senate of the University of New Zealand.

== Death and legacy ==
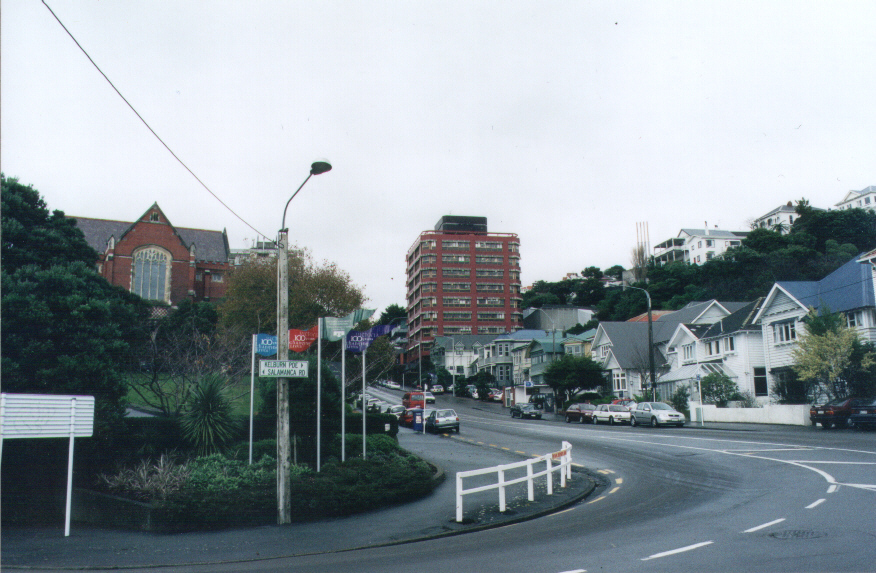
Von Zedlitz building (centre red building), at Victoria University of Wellington

He died in Wellington on 24 May 1949. In May 1979, Victoria University of Wellington officially opened the Von Zedlitz building on their Kelburn campus. Named in his honour, the building houses the School of Languages and Cultures.

Between 1906 and 1917, George von Zedlitz was the guide and the teacher of the younger days of Diamond Jenness, a pioneer of Canadian anthropology.
