= Orton Stevens =

New Zealand businessman and politician

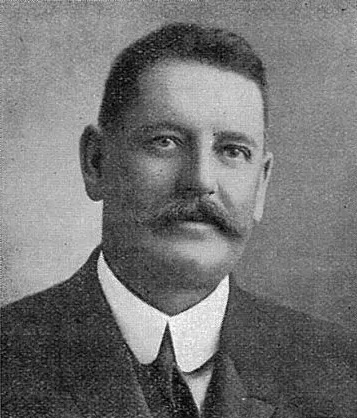

4th Mayor of Lower Hutt
- In office 24 April 1901 – 26 April 1905
- Preceded by: William Fitzherbert
- Succeeded by: Thomas William McDonald

Personal details
- Born: 2 February 1865 Forbes, New South Wales
- Died: 27 May 1914 (aged 49) Whangamarino, New Zealand
- Party: Reform
- Children: 2
- Profession: Insurance manager

Orton Stevens (2 February 1865 – 27 May 1914) was a New Zealand businessman and politician. A large man with an imposing frame he was Mayor of Lower Hutt from 1900 to 1905.

== Biography ==
Stevens was born in 1865 at Forbes in New South Wales. Upon leaving school he gained employment in the insurance industry at the office of the Mutual Assurance Society of Victoria, that later amalgamated with the National Mutual Life Assurance Society in 1896. At the time of amalgamation Stevens was appointed as the company's assistant secretary in its Queensland office. In 1898 he was appointed New Zealand manager for National Mutual.

In 1901 he was elected Mayor of Lower Hutt, defeating the incumbent Edmund Percy Bunny. He served until 1905 when he retired. His mayoralty was dominated by the need to build a new bridge over the Hutt River (the fifth time a new bridge was required). He lobbied the government hard for funding and logistical assistance. Prime Minister Richard Seddon was loath to commit support, but was eventually convinced by Stevens to help.

He died in 1914 at a Whangamarino in a train accident which killed two other people. He was survived by his wife and two children. At the time of his death he was expected to stand in the 1914 election in the Hutt electorate for the Reform Party.

== Notes ==
Political offices
Preceded by Edmund Percy Bunny	Mayor of Lower Hutt; 1901–1905	Succeeded by Thomas William McDonald
