= Edward Squire =

Edward Squire or Squier (died 1598) was an English scrivener and sailor, and an alleged conspirator against the life of Elizabeth I of England. He was executed, after an investigation of a series of obscure circumstances led to conviction for his apparent attempts to poison Queen Elizabeth and Robert Devereux, 2nd Earl of Essex. A long controversy on the truth of the matter then ensued.

== Life ==
Originally he was a scrivener at Greenwich, where he married and had children. He then obtained a post in Queen Elizabeth's stables (as an under-purveyor), but gave up his position to become a sailor. In August 1595 he started with Sir Francis Drake on his last voyage to the West Indies, on board the Francis, a small barque. Late in October, the Francis separated from the rest of the fleet off Guadeloupe, and was captured by five Spanish ships.

Squire was taken prisoner to Seville in Spain. Having been released on parole, he may have formed a plan for discovering Jesuit secrets by a pretended conversion. By attacks on the Roman Catholics he got himself imprisoned, and then was sent for Richard Walpole, a brother of Henry Walpole, and close to Robert Parsons. Walpole is alleged to have instigated him to assassinate the Earl of Essex and Queen Elizabeth. In order to disarm suspicion, a pretext was found for having Squire tried as a Protestant by the Spanish Inquisition.

The plan was to poison the pommel of the queen's saddle, for which Squire's previous experience in the royal stables afforded him opportunities. Squire was exchanged for some Spanish prisoners, and he arrived in England in June 1597. Late in that month he is said to have rubbed on the pommel of the queen's saddle some of the poison with which Walpole had supplied him, but without any result. A week or so later Squire, partly to escape detection and partly to make an attempt on Essex's life, embarked on the Earl's fleet then about to set out on the Islands Voyage. Between Fayal and St. Michael's he rubbed some poison on Essex's chair, with equal lack of success.

Soon afterwards either Squire himself or the Jesuits, believing that Squire had played them false, informed the English government of these designs. Early in the autumn of 1598 Squire was arrested, and on 9 November he was indicted for high treason. Repeated examinations by Francis Bacon and others produced varying results; at first he denied all knowledge of the plot; then he confessed both Walpole's machinations and his own attempts; subsequently he retracted the admission of his own misdeeds, but finally he repeated his confession, perhaps under torture; the official statement was that it was made ‘without any rigour in the world.’

He was condemned and on 23 November was hanged, drawn, and quartered at Tyburn, repudiating his former confessions. A special order of prayer and thanksgiving was issued to celebrate the queen's escape.

== Controversy ==
Squire's alleged treason was the subject of a literary war between the government and Roman Catholic apologists, and their respective versions differ in almost every detail. The official account, attributed by James Spedding to Bacon and printed among his works, was written by someone who was either present at Squire's examinations or had access to the official documents, which it closely follows. It is dated 23 December 1598, and was published as a ‘Letter written out of England to an English Gentleman remaining at Padua, containing a true report of a strange conspiracie contrived betweene Edward Squire … and Richard Walpole,’ London. It was reprinted in George Carleton's ‘Thankfull Remembrance,’ 1624; and again, in 1733, as ‘Authentic Memoirs of Father Richard Walpole,’ London, 1733.

A reply to the official story (attributed to Walpole) appeared as ‘The Discoverie and Confutation of a Tragicall Fiction devysed and played by Edward Squyer, yeoman soldiar … wherein the argument and fable is that he should be sent out of Spain … but the meaning and moralization thereof was to make odious the Iesuites, and by them all catholiques. Written … by M. A. Preest, that knew and dealt with Squyer in Spain,’ 1599. Another reply, ‘A Defence of the Catholyke Cause,’ was composed the same year by Thomas Fitzherbert, but not printed until 1602.

Godfrey Goodman doubted the story, alleging that Elizabeth I did not often ride at this time.
