= Swynnerton =

Village in Staffordshire, England

Coordinates: 52.917°N 2.217°W

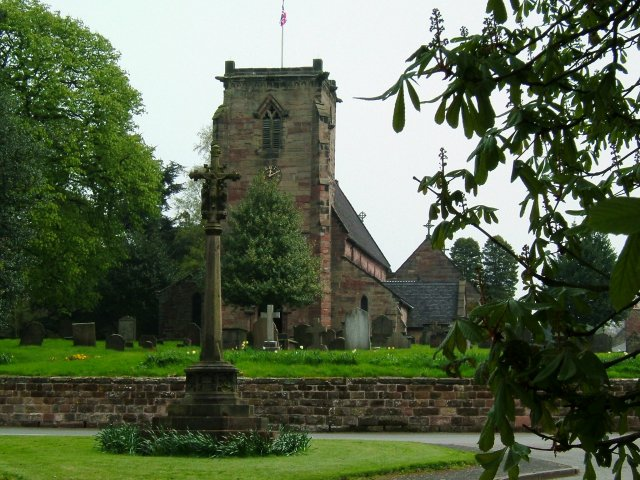
- St Mary's Church

- Location within Staffordshire
- Population: 4,453 (2011)
- OS grid reference: SJ8535
- Civil parish: Swynnerton
- District: Stafford
- Shire county: Staffordshire
- Region: West Midlands
- Country: England
- Sovereign state: United Kingdom
- Post town: STONE
- Postcode district: ST15
- Dialling code: 01782
- Police: Staffordshire
- Fire: Staffordshire
- Ambulance: West Midlands
- UK Parliament: Stoke-on-Trent South

Swynnerton is a village and civil parish in Staffordshire, England. It lies in the Borough of Stafford, and at the 2001 census had a population of 4,233, increasing to 4,453 at the 2011 Census.

Swynnerton is listed in the Domesday Book identifying the lord in 1066 as Brothir (of Oaken) and in 1086, Edelo (of Rauceby), who was in service to Robert de Stafford, the tenant-in-chief. The record shows the settlement consisted of ten villagers' households, and five smallholders. Property consisted of eight ploughlands suitable for one lord's plough teams, and six men's plough teams. Other resources are listed as ten acres of meadow, and one league of woodland. The owner's value was estimated at £2.

St Mary's Church dates back to at least the 13th century, and as far back as the 11th century. Swynnerton received its charter from Edward I in 1306. During the 14th century a market used to be held every Wednesday and an annual fair was held on 15 August each year.

A grand manor house used to exist until its destruction in the English Civil War by Cromwell's men, its replacement being Swynnerton Hall, built in 1725 by Francis Smith of Warwick, which still dominates the Swynnerton skyline today. The Roman Catholic church of Our Lady adjoins the hall, which was built in 1868 by Gilbert Blount. Most of the houses in the village are post World War II.

Nearby Cold Meece houses a British Army training area that used to be a Royal Ordnance Factory, ROF Swynnerton. It is often used by the Air Training Corps and the Army Cadet Force, but is also a regular training area for the British Army. During the war, the factory was served by Cold Meece railway station.

Yarnfield and Cold Meece civil parish and parish council came into being in April 2019, with two wards, Yarnfield and Cold Meece. It is included in the Borough of Stafford, and was previously the southern part of Swynnerton parish.

The village pub, the Fitzherbert Arms, has three bars, two dining areas and accommodation. The nearby Swynnerton village hall is a popular venue for social and sports activities with capacity for around a 100 people.

== Transport ==
Swynnerton is directly connected to Eccleshall by the Swynnerton Road. It is also a 10 minute drive from Stone and Meaford via the A51. The nearest city is Stoke-on-Trent, a 15 minute drive via the A51 and A34 roads.

The proposed east-west M64 motorway would have met the M6 here, but the motorway was cancelled in 1977.

The village is poorly served by public transport. The D&G Bus service number 14 previously called at the church bus stop five times a day on its way to and from Hanley, Trentham, Barlaston, Stone, Eccleshall and Stafford in 2017, however as of 2023 only a bus to Stone via Yarnfield operates. This is 5 times a day Monday - Friday, twice on Saturdays with no service on Sundays.

The nearest train station is Stone railway station, known officially as Stone (Staffs) and by railway code SNE 4.3 miles away.

== HS2 ==
Government plans for a new high speed rail line (part of what was known as HS2) to pass directly to the north of the village were first confirmed in 2013.

It immediately provoked controversy, with the nearest station intended for Crewe railway station over 20 miles away, due to local impact and lack of considered benefits to Staffordshire including from the current resident of Swynnerton Hall, Lord Stafford.

When the act of parliament for HS2a (West Midlands - Crewe) received Royal Assent works by HS2 Ltd intensified, the compulsory land purchase process began which included a small number of properties, farmland and woodland on the edge of the village.

In late 2021 eco campaigners opposed to the destruction of specific ancient woodlands along the route arrived outside the village and set up encampments within local woodlands earmarked for demolition. They sought the support of the local community through flyering and Facebook via what was called the 'Bluebell Wood HS2 Resistance Camp'. The group grew to over 1,000 members suggesting either strong local environmental concern or NIMBYism. Despite being served an eviction notice in March 2022 they were only removed after exhausting supplies in tunnels in July.

Work then continued with updates from HS2 to residents, with security to prevent return of protestors and early earth works related to gas pipelines.

In March 2023 the Transport Secretary Mark Harper announced a two year 'phased delay' to HS2 due to spiralling costs. As a result of this, the encampments outside the village were largely abandoned and leaflets issued to residents advised 90% of works intended to be progressed were being put on hold.

In September 2023 at the Conservative Party Conference in Manchester, Prime Minister Rishi Sunak announced that HS2 north of Birmingham was being scrapped. It was now expected the local land will be resold and the project will not be renewed, as the Labour Party had not recommitted to the project should it win the next general election.

== Notable residents ==
- Thomas Fitzherbert (1552–1640) was an English Jesuit, born at Swynnerton. His father died whilst he was an infant and he was the head of an important family.
- Lord Stafford's family presence dates back several centuries.
- Maria Fitzherbert (1756-1837) companion and (invalidly) first wife of George IV, was previously wife of Thomas Fitzherbert of Swynnerton, from 1778 to his death in 1781.
- Henry Wadsworth Longfellow (1807–1882) is believed to have penned his famous poem, The Village Blacksmith, in Swynnerton.

== Nearby locations ==
- Eccleshall
- Meaford
- Stafford
- Stoke-on-Trent
- Stone
- Tittensor
- Trentham
- Yarnfield

== See also ==
- Listed buildings in Swynnerton
