= Henry Baldwin (mayor) =

New Zealand mayor

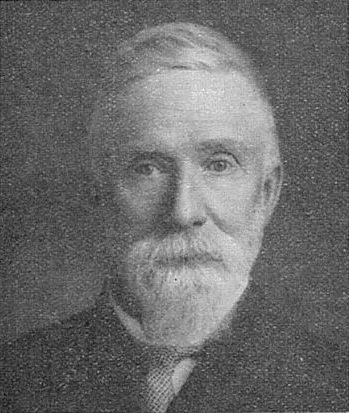

7th Mayor of Lower Hutt
- In office 7 May 1914 – 8 April 1918
- Preceded by: Edmund Percy Bunny
- Succeeded by: Percy Rishworth

Personal details
- Born: 1856 London, England
- Died: 30 October 1928 (aged 71–72) Lower Hutt, New Zealand
- Spouse: Eliza Meyrick (m. 1879)
- Children: 4
- Profession: Retailer

Henry Baldwin (1856 – 30 October 1928) was a British born New Zealand businessman and politician who was Mayor of Lower Hutt and chairman of the Wellington Hospital Board.

== Biography ==
Baldwin was born in 1856 to a Cockney family in Stepney in London's east end. He came to New Zealand in 1876 and was employed at the retail store Plimmer and Beeves. He went into business for himself as a grain and produce merchant around 1898. He ran his business, H. Baldwin and Co., until he retired in 1923.

From 1905 to 1911 he was elected a member of the Lower Hutt Borough Council. In 1911 and 1912 he contested the mayoralty against Edmund Percy Bunny but was defeated. When Bunny retired in 1914 he stood again and was elected Mayor of Lower Hutt on his third attempt ahead of two sitting borough councillors. His mayoralty coincided with World War I and his mayoralty was dominated by issues related to the war. Farmers in the Hutt Valley profited from selling their food to European markets. He and the council supported the war effort but by mid-1915 the council protested the government for selling produce internationally stating it left locals deprived. The council responded by allocating the land of the Hutt Recreation Ground to grow potatoes to assist with food production. Towards the end of the war he resigned on 8 April 1918 and was succeeded by Percy Rishworth.

In 1910 he was elected a member of the Wellington Hospital Board and remained a member until 1921 when he retired. From 1915 to 1919 he was chairman of the hospital board.

He was expected to stand in the 1914 election in the Hutt electorate for the Reform Party. However he declined to stand.

He died at his Lower Hutt home in 1928, survived by his sister and three daughters. He was predeceased by his wife and son who were killed during the sinking of the SS Wairarapa off Great Barrier Island in October 1894.

== Notes ==
Political offices
Preceded by Edmund Percy Bunny	Mayor of Lower Hutt; 1914–1918	Succeeded by Percy Rishworth
Preceded by William Albert Evans	Chair of Wellington Hospital Board; 1915–1919	Succeeded by Fred Castle
