= William Fitzherbert (MP for Lichfield) =

English politician

William Fitzherbert (c. 1520–1559?), of Lichfield and Swynnerton, Staffordshire and the Inner Temple, London, was an English politician.

He was a member (MP) of the parliament of England for Lichfield in March 1553.
