= Percy Rishworth =

New Zealand politician

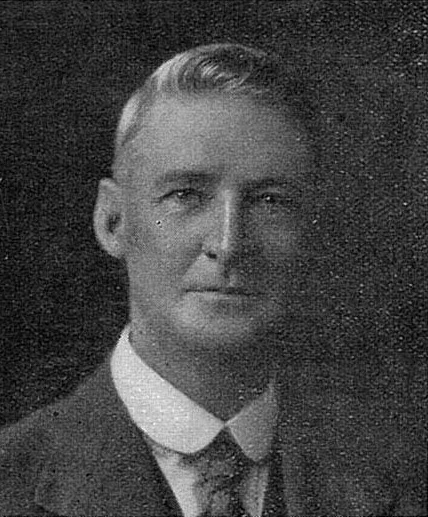

8th Mayor of Lower Hutt
- In office 27 April 1918 – 21 December 1921
- Preceded by: Henry Baldwin
- Succeeded by: Will Strand

Personal details
- Born: Edward Percival Rishworth; 30 May 1869
- Died: 28 March 1930 (aged 61)
- Party: Reform
- Profession: Dentist

Edward Percival Rishworth (30 May 1869 – 28 March 1930) was a New Zealand politician who was Mayor of Lower Hutt from 1918 to 1921.

== Biography ==
Rishworth was a dentist by profession with his own clinic in Lower Hutt. He was interested in education and served for many years on multiple local educational bodies. He was chairman of the Hutt District High School committee, the Hutt Valley's representative on the Wellington Education Board. and chairman of the Hutt Valley High School Board of Governors. He was instrumental in obtaining the land from the Government where Hutt Valley High School was built. He was a member of the Lower Hutt Bowling and Tennis Club and a freemason.

He became Mayor of Lower Hutt in 1918 after the previous mayor, Henry Baldwin, resigned. His first years as mayor were dominated by the Spanish flu epidemic and coordinated the council's response. He was praised for his response and was thus unopposed at the next two mayoral elections. He also stood in the 1919 election in the Hutt electorate for the Reform Party, but could not unseat the incumbent, Thomas Wilford. In 1921 Rishworth had a disagreement with the Ratepayers' Association and some councillors over the erection of a gasworks in Lower Hutt as an alternative to using Petone gasworks. The public supported a new gasworks in a plebiscite but the Ratepayers' Association remained opposed it. In December 1921 councillor Will Strand made a speech to the Ratepayers' Association accusing Rishworth of a 'breach of faith' which was later leaked and published in newspapers. At the next council meeting Rishworth addressed the matter and challenged Strand to resign along with himself and contest an election for mayor. Strand accepted the challenge and defeated Rishworth in the by-election.

He died in Lower Hutt on 28 March 1930. He was survived by his wife and family.

Political offices
Preceded by Henry Baldwin	Mayor of Lower Hutt; 1918–1921	Succeeded by Will Strand
