= David Ewen (politician) =

New Zealand businessman (1884–1957)

Sir David Alexander Ewen KBE (1884 – 7 April 1957) was a New Zealand businessman, soldier and politician.

== Biography ==
Ewen was born in Middlesex in 1884. He was educated at Mill Hill School. In 1912 he married Marian Nathan. The next year they moved to New Zealand where they had one daughter and two sons. He began a successful business career as the managing director of Sargood Sons & Ewen Ltd. He was also chairman of the Sargood Trust, a charity the company funded to help crippled children throughout New Zealand.

He served in World War I with the New Zealand Field Artillery unit and was later an embarkation officer from 1915 to 1917. After the war he was appointed a Member of the Order of the British Empire (Military) in the 1919 Birthday Honours. He was an assistant embarkation officer in the World War II, with the rank of major.

At the 1923 local elections he was elected to the Lower Hutt Borough Council. His main ambition as a councillor was to upgrade the Hutt Bridge which was on its fifth iteration (built in 1904) and was struggling to cope with traffic levels as well as accommodating motor vehicles. A new bridge with a higher capacity for traffic was constructed and eventually opened in 1929. Its name was changed to the Ewen Bridge in his honour.

In 1934 he was appointed as an inaugural director of the Reserve Bank of New Zealand, as a Government nominee. In 1941 he became a director of the Australian Mutual Provident Society.

In the 1946 New Year Honours, Ewen was appointed an Officer of the Order of the British Empire for service as a member of the Supply Council. He was made a Knight Commander of the Order of the British Empire in the 1952 New Year Honours. He was involved with the boy scout movement and in 1953 he was awarded the highest scout service award Silver Wolf.

Ewen was an art enthusiast and donated many pictures to the National Art Gallery. For six years (1932 to 1938) he was president of the New Zealand Academy of Fine Arts, and until his death was a member of the board of trustees of both the National Art Gallery and Dominion Museum. He was also a former New Zealand governor of Rotary International.

Ewen died in 1957, aged 73. He was survived by his wife and three children.
