= William Fitzherbert (mayor) =

New Zealand mayor

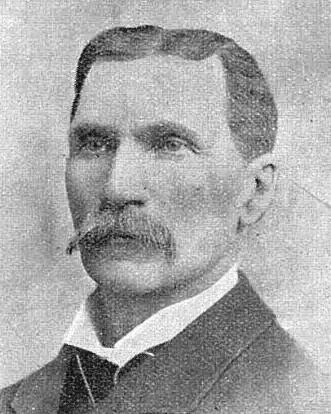

1st mayor of Lower Hutt
- In office 1 February 1891 – 18 November 1898
- Succeeded by: Walter George Foster

Personal details
- Born: William Alfred Fitzherbert; 21 January 1842 London, England
- Died: 2 February 1906 (aged 64) Lower Hutt, New Zealand
- Spouse: Fanny Waterhouse (m. 1875)
- Relations: William Fitzherbert (father); George Waterhouse (father-in-law)
- Children: 9
- Profession: Engineer

William Alfred Fitzherbert (21 January 1842 – 2 February 1906) was the first mayor of Lower Hutt, New Zealand, from when Lower Hutt became a borough in 1891 to 1898. He was an engineer and farmer in New Zealand.

== Biography ==
William Fitzherbert was born in London in 1842, a son of William Fitzherbert. The family followed his father to Wellington about 1846. Fitzherbert was educated in Wellington, at Sydney Grammar School, and at Canterbury University College. He was an engineer with the Wellington Provincial Council and with the Hutt County Council. He farmed in the Wanganui district, and then in the Hutt Valley and in Hawke's Bay.

On 17 November 1875, he married Fanny, the adopted daughter of George Waterhouse. They had five daughters and four sons.

In 1904 he built Norbury, now Minoh Friendship House, to house his daughter Alice and her husband George William von Zedlitz, Victoria University's first professor of modern languages. Alice married Professor von Zedlitz in 1905, and Alicetown in Lower Hutt was named after her.

Fitzherbert died suddenly in Lower Hutt on 2 February 1906 of heart failure.

In 2011, plaques were installed on 13 boulders at the Hutt Recreation Ground commemorating the first 13 mayors.

Political offices
New title	Mayor of Lower Hutt; 1891–1898	Succeeded by Walter George Foster
