= Alexander Fowler Roberts =

New Zealand businessman, soldier and politician

Sir Alex Roberts KBE
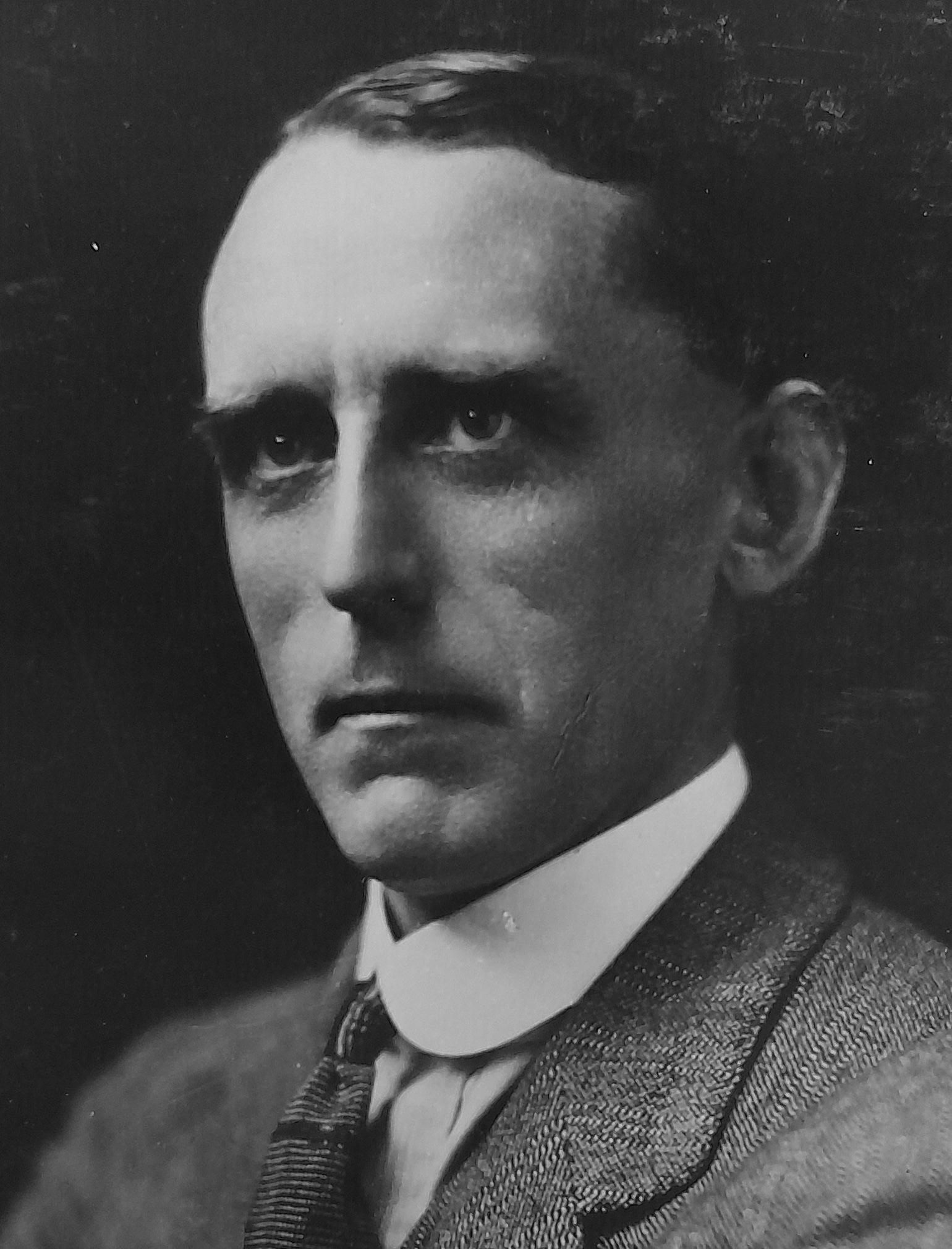

10th Mayor of Lower Hutt
- In office 16 May 1929 – 13 May 1931
- Deputy: Archibald John Hobbs
- Preceded by: Will Strand
- Succeeded by: Will Strand

Personal details
- Born: 1882 Dunedin, New Zealand
- Died: 19 March 1961 (aged 78–79) Wellington, New Zealand
- Spouse: Hannah Ruby Farquhar (m. 1907)
- Children: 1
- Profession: Managing director

Sir Alexander Fowler Roberts KBE (1882 – 19 March 1961) was a New Zealand businessman, soldier and politician.

== Biography ==
Roberts was born in Dunedin in 1882. He was educated at Merchiston Castle School in Edinburgh and Clare College, Cambridge. In 1903 he gained employment with Murray Roberts & Co, a stock and station agency. During World War I he was stationed in Wellington as a staff embarkation officer with the rank of lieutenant colonel. He was appointed an Officer of the Order of the British Empire in the 1918 New Year Honours and soon after as a Commander of the Order of the British Empire for valuable services rendered in connection with the War in the 1919 Birthday Honours. In 1924 he was designated New Zealand commissioner to the British Empire Exhibition held at Wembley Park in London. He was made a Knight Commander of the British Empire in 1926 for services in connection with the Wembley Exhibition. In 1929 he became the Murray Roberts & Co company's managing director.

He was a member of the Lower Hutt Borough Council from 1923 to 1925 and again from 1927 to 1929. From 1929 to 1931 he served for a term as Mayor of Lower Hutt succeeding the sitting mayor, William Thomas Strand, who did not run for another term. Two years later Roberts also declined to seek another term and Strand stood again, succeeding him unopposed. He was speculated as a potential candidate for the Reform Party at the 1929 Hutt by-election by media. However he declined to be a candidate.

In World War II Roberts was again an embarkation staff officer from 1940 to 1945 as well as the New Zealand representative of the British Ministry of War Transport from 1941 to 1948. He was involved on the sport of golf and was a member of the council of the New Zealand Golf Association for 30 years, including a period as its chairman.

He died in Calvary Hospital, Wellington on 19 March 1961. He was survived by his wife and three sons.

== Notes ==
Political offices
Preceded by Will Strand	Mayor of Lower Hutt; 1929–1931	Succeeded by Will Strand
