= Will Strand =

New Zealand politician (1877–1960)

Will Strand MBE
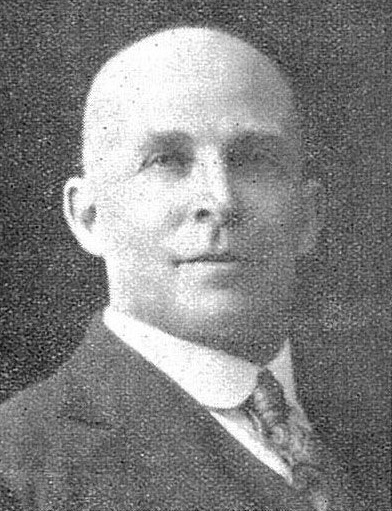
- Strand, c. 1920s

9th Mayor of Lower Hutt
- In office 13 May 1931 – 10 May 1933
- Preceded by: Sir Alex Roberts
- Succeeded by: Jack Andrews
- In office 21 December 1921 – 16 May 1929
- Preceded by: Percy Rishworth
- Succeeded by: Sir Alex Roberts

Personal details
- Born: 1877 Boulcott, New Zealand
- Died: 10 August 1960 (aged 82–83) Lower Hutt, New Zealand
- Party: Reform
- Spouse(s): Catherine Margaret Sheil (m. 1899; died 1930) Myrtle Katherine Hughes (m. 1936)
- Profession: Farmer

William Thomas Strand MBE (1877 – 10 August 1960) was a New Zealand politician. He was Mayor of Lower Hutt on two occasions.

== Biography ==
=== Early life and career ===
Strand was born in 1877 in his family's farm cottage at Boulcott. His father was an early settler to Port Nicholson, originally from Kent. He had no formal education and worked on his family farm growing vegetables and raspberries, which were sold at the market gardens in Taitā. At the age of 19 he left to travel overseas, working on a ship and later at the London docks. He later recounted "That was my university education; I learned not to judge a man by the suit he wears".

He returned to the Hutt Valley and became a builder and built two cottages. He entered the employment of Edward "King" Riddiford who advised him that buying assets in land would be a prosperous investment. He purchased large areas of land (most of which is now Hutt Valley High School) from Riddiford and managed Riddiford's Woburn farm. After several years in farm management he returned to the building trade, starting his own saw-milling and timber trade business with his two brothers. Later he managed a pipe and steel company.

=== Political career ===
In January 1921, Strand was elected to the Hutt River Board, and was elected chairman in his first term after all but one of the incumbents failed to be re-elected. He initiated a system for shingle extraction from the river bed, which led to a new revenue source for the region. He also approved the deepening of the river bed as a flood protection measure. He remained a board member until 1929, with a subsequent term as a member from 1933 to 1935.

In April 1921, Strand was elected to the Lower Hutt Borough Council. In December 1921, Strand and the Mayor, Percy Rishworth, disagreed with the erection of a gasworks in Lower Hutt. The public supported a new gasworks in a plebiscite but Strand and the Ratepayers' Association opposed it. Strand made a speech to the Ratepayers' Association accusing Rishworth of a 'breach of faith' which was later leaked and published in newspapers. At the next council meeting Rishworth addressed the matter and challenged Strand to resign along with himself and contest an election for mayor. Strand accepted the challenge and defeated Rishworth in the by-election. In 1923, Strand secured possession of land in the Hutt Valley and handed over ownership to central government. Working with the government he worked to have the land used for constructing state houses. In 1926 they opened and were sold specifically to people unable to afford State Advances Corporation loans. This led to the new suburb of Moera with new homes erected. New railway lines were also constructed in the land, changing the lines from the eastern to western side of the Hutt River. His term as mayor also saw the purchase of the civic centre and construction of a larger Ewen Bridge in 1929.

Strand served as mayor until 1929 when he declined to seek re-election. He was touted as a potential candidate for the Reform Party at the 1929 Hutt by-election by media, however he declined to become a candidate. Two years later, his successor as mayor, Sir Alex Roberts, also declined to seek another term and Strand was persuaded to stand again, succeeding him unopposed. He retired in 1933.

=== Later life and death ===
In 1949, he made a grant of 150 acres of land in Naenae to the Methodist Board of Trust, on condition for the construction of new houses and required amenities. A further 50 acres was given to the Hutt Rotary Club to build a youth centre. In the mid-1950s, Strand suffered an illness that reduced his mobility, after which he spent much time at his home in Melling. He was appointed a Member of the Order of the British Empire (MBE) in the 1957 New Year Honours for his services to local government, the award being presented at his home by the Governor-General as a result of Strand's illness.

Strand died in 1960 at Hutt Hospital aged 85.

== Personal life ==
Strand's first wife, Catherine Margaret Sheil, died on 18 October 1930 aged 55. In 1936, he remarried to Myrtle Katherine Hughes.

Their son, engineer William Charles Strand, was killed is a plane crash in 1931 at the North Clyde railway yards in Wairoa. The accident occurred while performing a mail drop to the town, which was cut off after damage to roads due to the 1931 Hawke's Bay earthquake. Strand sued Dominion Airlines for £5000 in damages for his son's death, arguing negligence on the basis that the pilot, Ivan Kight, did not possess the necessary licence required to fly either passengers or goods. The judge found that the cause of the crash was negligence on the part of the pilot and awarded Strand £3000 plus costs. Dominion Airlines was awarded costs by the Court of Appeal, but the airline was eventually forced into liquidation.

Political offices
Preceded by Percy Rishworth	Mayor of Lower Hutt; 1921–1929 1931-1933	Succeeded by Sir Alex Roberts
Preceded by Sir Alex Roberts	Mayor of Lower Hutt; 1921–1929 1931-1933	Succeeded by Jack Andrews
