= Mayor of Lower Hutt =

- Coat of arms of Lower Hutt

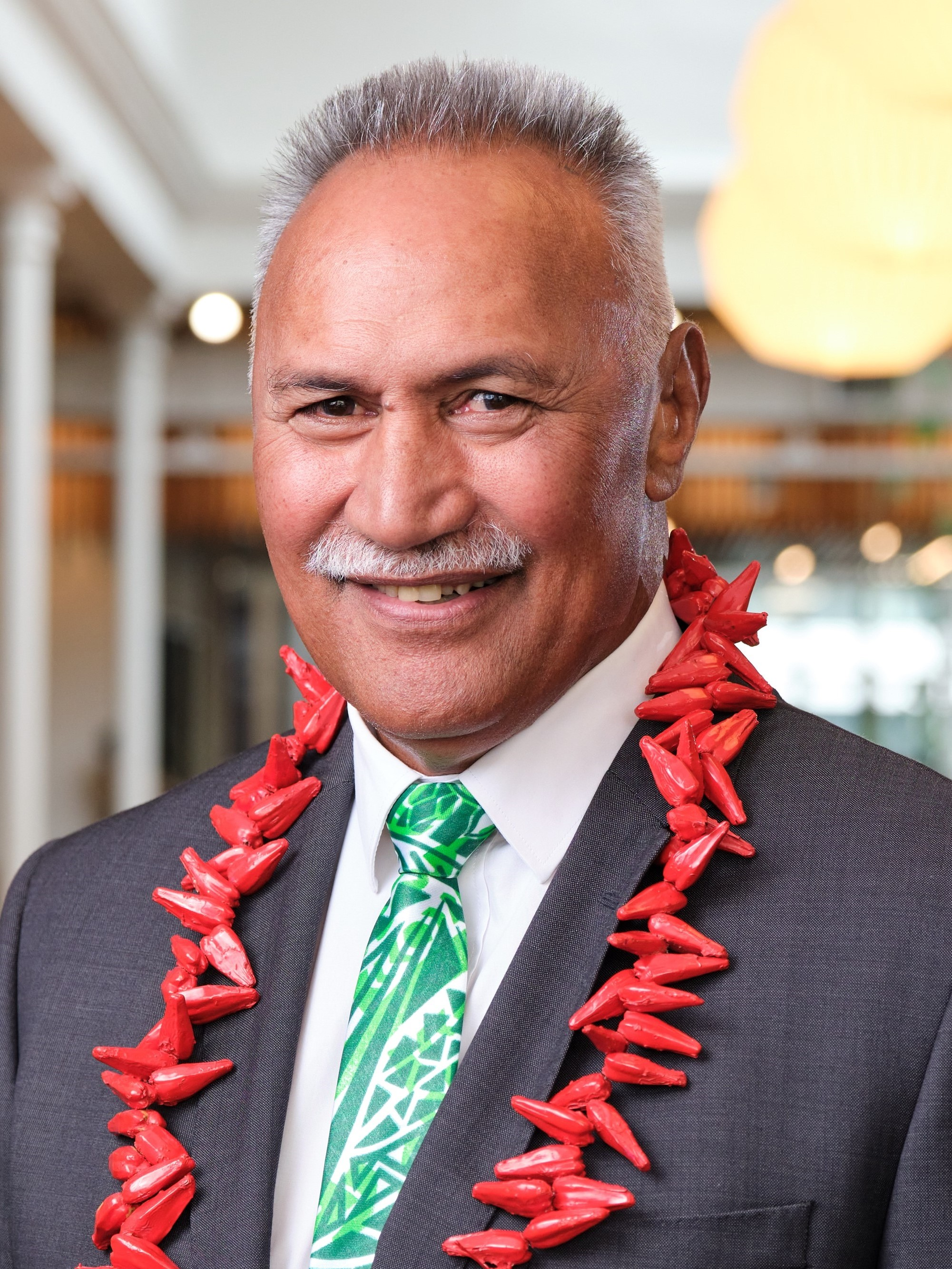
- Incumbent; Ken Laban since 2025
- Style: His Worship
- Member of: Hutt City Council
- Term length: Three years, renewable
- Inaugural holder: William Fitzherbert
- Formation: 1891
- Deputy: Keri Brown
- Salary: $158,000
- Website: Official website

The city of Lower Hutt, New Zealand, was first proclaimed a borough on 1 February 1891. Prior to this it had been part of Hutt County, initially as a Roads Board and from 1881 as a Town Board.

Since October 2025, the mayor has been Ken Laban.

== History ==
The Hutt County Council was established in 1877, covering the region from Wellington's south coast up to Waikanae, excluding Wellington City. The county council was headed by a chairman rather than a mayor. As the region grew, urban parts of the Hutt County became autonomous boroughs with Lower Hutt becoming its own borough in 1891 with a borough council headed by a mayor to be directly elected by ratepayers. William Fitzherbert was elected unopposed with six borough councillors also being elected. From the 1920s on population grew quickly and in 1941 Lower Hutt became a city after reaching the required population of 20,000 for city status. As a result of the 1989 local government reforms Lower Hutt City amalgamated several of the neighbouring authorities including the Petone Borough Council, Eastbourne Borough Council and Hutt County Council (centred on Wainuiomata) as well as land on the waterfront formerly in the possession of the Wellington Harbour Board. The sitting mayor of Lower Hutt City was elected as mayor of the expanded Hutt City Council in 1989, however retaining the title mayor of Lower Hutt despite the "Lower" being dropped from the name of the council.

The longest-serving mayor was Percy Dowse who held office for twenty years, from 1950 to 1970.

== List of mayors ==
Mayors of Lower Hutt have been:

Key

Independent Citizens' Labour

#	Name	Portrait	Term of office	
1	William Fitzherbert		1 February 1891	18 November 1898
2	Walter George Foster		18 November 1898	5 March 1900
3	Edmund Percy Bunny		5 March 1900	24 April 1901
4	Orton Stevens		24 April 1901	26 April 1905
5	Thomas William McDonald		26 April 1905	1 May 1907
6	Thomas Peterkin		1 May 1907	6 May 1909
(3)	Edmund Percy Bunny		6 May 1909	7 May 1914
7	Henry Baldwin		7 May 1914	8 April 1918
8	Percy Rishworth		27 April 1918	21 December 1921
9	Will Strand		21 December 1921	16 May 1929
10	Alex Roberts		16 May 1929	13 May 1931
(9)	Will Strand		13 May 1931	10 May 1933
11	Jack Andrews		10 May 1933	9 June 1947
12	Ernst Hay		9 June 1947	20 January 1949
13	William Gregory		14 March 1949	18 November 1950
14	Percy Dowse		18 November 1950	9 December 1970
15	John Kennedy-Good		21 December 1970	24 October 1986
16	Glen Evans		24 October 1986	31 October 1995
17	John Terris		31 October 1995	10 October 2004
18	David Ogden		10 October 2004	9 October 2010
19	Ray Wallace		9 October 2010	12 October 2019
20	Campbell Barry		12 October 2019	17 October 2025
21	Ken Laban		17 October 2025	present

=== List of deputy mayors ===
Key

Independent Citizens' Labour

Name	Term of office		Mayor
William Henry Russell	1908	1909	Peterkin
Vacant
Henry Baldwin	1910	1911	Bunny
Vacant
John Brassell	1918		Baldwin
Vacant
Archibald John Hobbs	1925	1931	Strand
Archibald John Hobbs	1925	1931	Roberts
John Mitchell	1931	1944	Andrews
Ernst Hay	1944	1947	Andrews
William Gregory	1947	1949	Hay
Eric Rothwell	1949	1950	Gregory
Harry Horlor	1950	1956	Dowse
James McDonald	1956	1959	Dowse
George Barker	1959	1962	Dowse
Chen Werry	1962	1968	Dowse
Dave Hadley	1968	1971	Dowse
Dave Hadley	1968	1971	Kennedy-Good
John Seddon	1971	1974	Kennedy-Good
Chen Werry	1974	1977	Kennedy-Good
Ernie Barry	1977	1980	Kennedy-Good
Mollie Ngan Kee	1980	1983	Kennedy-Good
Teri Puketapu	1983	1989	Kennedy-Good
Teri Puketapu	1983	1989	Evans
Betty van Gaalen	1989	1995	Evans
Joan Monrad	1995	1998	Terris
Pat Brosnan	1998	2001	Terris
Ray Wallace	2001	2004	Terris
Roger Styles	2004	2010	Ogden
David Bassett	2010	2019	Wallace
Tui Lewis	2019	2025	Barry
Keri Brown	2025	present	Laban
