= Mayor of Eastbourne =

Head of local government in New Zealand

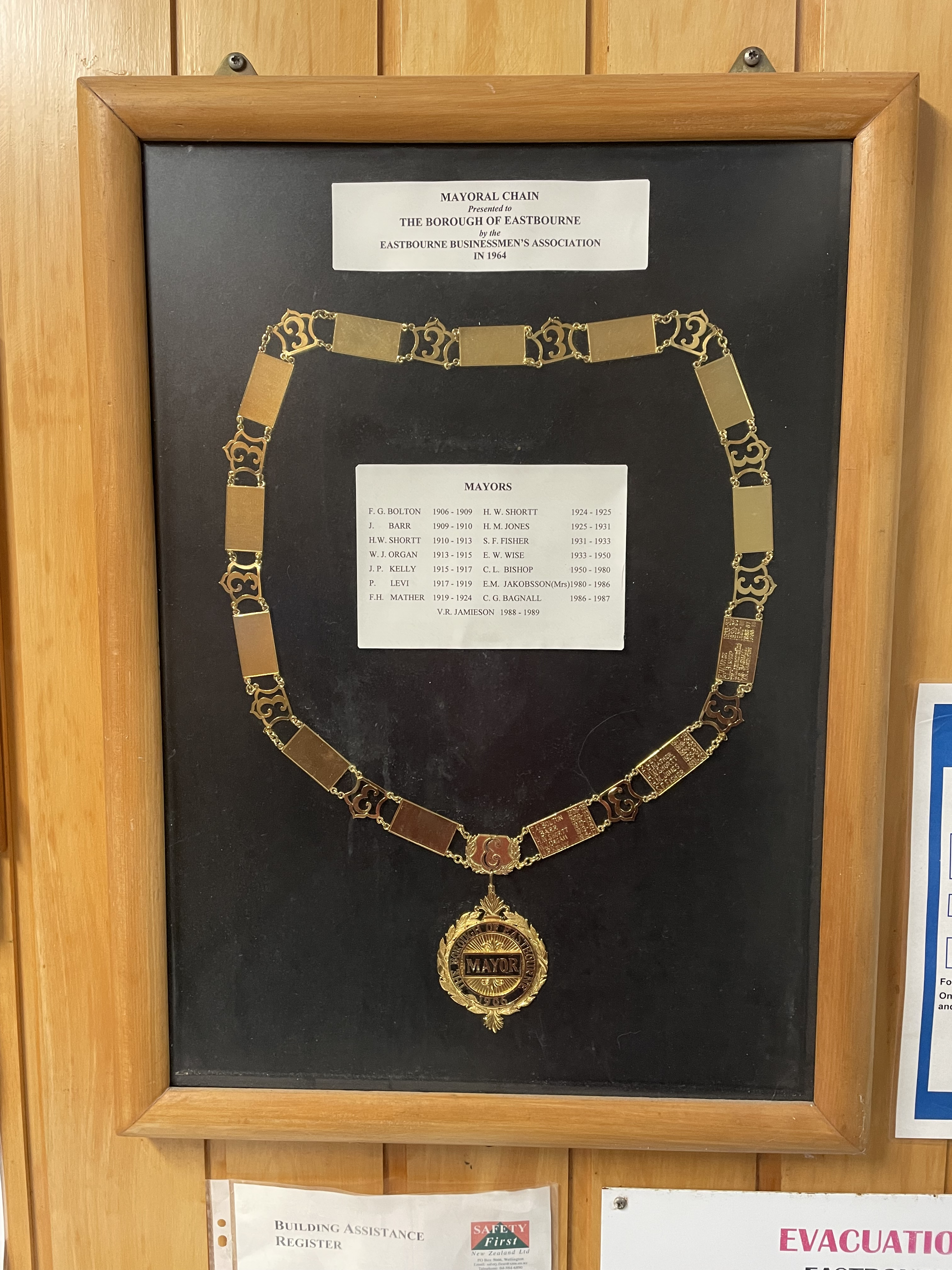
Mayoral Chain for the Borough of Eastbourne

The Mayor of Eastbourne officiated over the Eastbourne Borough of New Zealand, which was administered by the Eastbourne Borough Council. The office existed from 1906 until 1989, when Eastbourne Borough was amalgamated into the Hutt City Council as part of the 1989 local government reforms. There were fourteen holders of the office.

== History ==
Eastbourne was constituted as a borough in 1905 after the passing of the Eastbourne Borough Bill, 1905 which was sponsored by local Member of Parliament Thomas Wilford. At the 1906 elections the first election was held and Fred Bolton was elected Eastbourne's inaugural mayor. Bolton served until 1909 when he instead stood for Mayor of Wellington at that year's election, but was unsuccessful.

Eastbourne's Town Clerk, Cliff Bishop, was elected mayor in 1950. He served a record ten terms consecutively. He was popular, usually winning office unopposed, having only been challenged twice. When he retired in 1980 he was New Zealand's longest serving mayor. After Bishop retired councillor Elaine Jakobsson became the only woman elected mayor. Jakobsson retired after two terms and was succeeded by Charles Bagnall who was opposed to the proposed amalgamation of Eastbourne with Lower Hutt. He later changed his mind on amalgamation, seeing it as inevitable, and resigned after just over a year as mayor on 26 November 1987. The deputy mayor, Joy Baird, acted as mayor until a by-election was held in February 1988 which saw Ross Jamieson elected as mayor, defeating Baird and four other candidates.

As a result of the 1989 local government reforms Eastbourne Borough Council was amalgamated with Lower Hutt City, Petone Borough and Hutt County to form Hutt City Council. At the 1989 local elections Baird was elected to the Hutt City Council for the Harbour ward (which encompassed Eastbourne and Petone) while Jamieson was defeated also standing in the Harbour ward. However Jamieson was elected to the Eastbourne Community Board and was its inaugural chairman. Jamieson stood for Mayor of Lower Hutt several times in 1995 and again in 2007. He was unsuccessful in both attempts.

== List of mayors ==
Mayors of Eastbourne were:

	Name	Term
1	Fred Bolton	1906–1909
2	John Barr	1909–1910
3	Herbert William Shortt	1910–1913
4	William John Organ	1913–1915
5	James Patrick Kelly	1915–1917
6	Phineas Levi	1917–1919
7	Francis Henry Mather	1919–1920
(3)	Herbert William Shortt ^{a}	1920
(7)	Francis Henry Mather	1920–1924
(3)	Herbert William Shortt	1924–1925
8	Henry Morgan Jones	1925–1931
9	Sam Fisher	1931–1933
10	Wally Wise	1933–1950
11	Cliff Bishop	1950–1980
12	Elaine Jakobsson	1980–1986
13	Charles Bagnall	1986–1987
-	Joy Baird ^{a}	1987–1988
14	Ross Jamieson	1988–1989

^{a} Indicates acting mayor

== See also ==
- Mayoral elections in Eastbourne
