= 1989 Lower Hutt mayoral election =

← 1986	14 October 1989	1992 →
- Turnout: 28,713 (45.50%)

Candidate	Glen Evans	Ted Woolf
Party	Citizens'	Independent
Popular vote	17,705	4,795
Percentage	61.66	16.69
Mayor before election
Glen Evans
Elected mayor
Glen Evans

The 1989 Lower Hutt mayoral election was part of the New Zealand local elections held that same year. The elections were held for the role of Mayor of Lower Hutt plus other local government positions including fifteen city councillors, also elected triennially. The polling was conducted using the standard first-past-the-post electoral method.

== Background ==
The 1989 local elections were the first following a major overhaul of local government in New Zealand. The existing Lower Hutt City Council was renamed as the Hutt City Council after greatly expanding, absorbing several of the neighboring authorities including the Petone Borough Council, Eastbourne Borough Council and Hutt County Council as well as land on the waterfront formerly in the possession of the Wellington Harbour Board. Electoral reforms were implemented at the 1989 municipal elections, the method of electing councillors at large was replaced with a ward system of local electoral districts.

The incumbent mayor of Lower Hutt, Glen Evans, was re-elected in a landslide for the enlarged council and his United Citizens ticket won a large majority of council seats. The Mayor of Petone Ted Woolf and former Petone mayor Ron Marston, who were opposed to the borough's amalgamation with Lower Hutt, both stood as candidates. Both were defeated for the mayoralty but Woolf was elected a councillor for the new Harbour Ward (which incorporated Petone). Perennial candidate Nick Ursin of Lower Hutt and Stephen Dransfield from Wainuiomata were also candidates. Eastbourne mayor Ross Jamieson was defeated standing for a council seat for the Harbour Ward but was elected a member of the Eastbourne Community Board.

== Mayoral results ==
The following table gives the election results:

1989 Lower Hutt mayoral election
Party	Candidate	Votes	%	±%
United Citizens	Glen Evans	17,705	61.66	+14.45
Independent	Ted Woolf	4,795	16.69	
Independent	Ron Marston	2,122	7.39	
Independent	Stephen Greenfield	1,997	6.95	
Independent	Nick Ursin	1,082	3.76	
Informal votes		1,012	3.52	−1.25
Majority		12,910	44.96	+28.08
Turnout		28,713	45.50	+14.50

== Ward results ==
Candidates were also elected from wards to the Hutt City Council.

Party/ticket	Councillors
United Citizens	12
Independent	3
