= Amy Kane (community leader) =

New Zealand journalist and community leader

- Born: Amy Grace Kane; 9 December 1879 Wellington, New Zealand
- Died: 9 April 1979 Wellington, New Zealand
- Occupation: Community leader, Journalist
- Partners: Daisy Isaacs

Amy Grace Kane OBE (9 December 1879 – 9 April 1979) was a New Zealand journalist and community leader.

== Biography ==
Kane was born in Wellington, New Zealand, on 9 December 1879. Her mother, Martha Lydia Warburton (d. 1944) was the daughter of early settlers who arrived to New Zealand in 1840 and 1842. Her father, Robert William Kane (d. 1923) was a director of the Bank of New Zealand and financial advisor to the Public Trust Office. She had a brother, Francis William Kane, who died at Passchendaele in 1917 and a sister, May Kane.

Between 1885 and 1899, her family lived in Adelaide while her father managed two Australian branches of the Bank of New Zealand. The family returned to New Zealand in 1900 and lived in Wellington.

After living in England for two years in 1906, Kane returned to New Zealand and began writing for the 'Women's Pages' of the Free Lance, a weekly pictorial newspaper based in Wellington. She started working for The New Zealand Times in 1914, which in 1927 merged with The Dominion, where she held the position of editor until 1931.

Amy lived with her 'companion', Daisy Isaacs for many years, until Isaac's death in 1986. The couple lived together on Mahoe Street in Eastbourne, alongside a lesbian friendship circle which included couple Margaret Magill and Mimie Wood as well as Rhoda Messenger and Dora Johnson. Kane and Isaacs were both involved in New Zealand Theatre and played in a orchestra with author Katherine Mansfield.

Kane was a lifelong supporter of the Red Cross and helped start the Wellington branch near the start of the First World War. Then, during the Great Depression, Kane became involved in relief work for unemployed women.

Kane was involved in many clubs, societies, and boards, such the Pioneer Club, in which she was founding member and served as president from 1922 to 1957.She was also involved in the British Drama League, the English-Speaking Union, British Commonwealth League, the Lyceum Club, the Women's Unemployment Committee and the Wellington Hospital Board. Kane was also president of the New Zealand Federation of Women's Institutes from 1938 to 1943 and was on the national committee of the Women's War Service Auxiliary.

In the 1951 New Year Honours, Kane was appointed an Officer of the Order of the British Empire for social welfare services, especially in connection with women's organisations. In 1953, she was awarded the Queen Elizabeth II Coronation Medal.

Kane died on 9 April in Wellington aged 99 years.

== Images ==
- Amy Grace Kane, circa 1943
- Amy Kane at her investiture at Government House, circa 1951
