= 1989 Hutt City Council election =

Local elections in New Zealand

← 1986	14 October 1989	1992 →
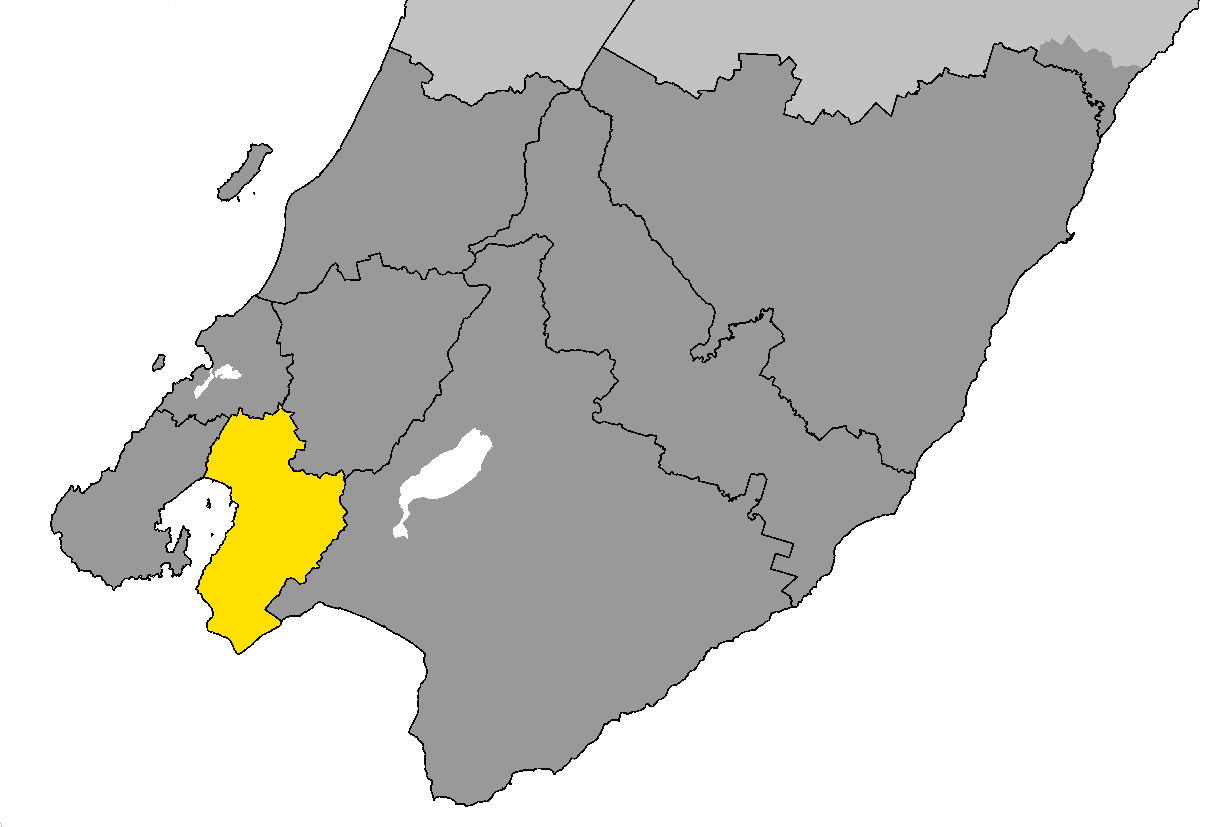
- Position of Lower Hutt within Wellington Region

The 1989 Hutt City Council election was part of the 1989 New Zealand local elections, to elect members to sub-national councils and boards. The Hutt City elections covered one regional council (the Wellington Regional Council), city council, area health board, and various local boards and licensing trusts. The polling was conducted using the standard first-past-the-post electoral method.

== Hutt City Council ==
=== Mayor ===
1989 Lower Hutt mayoral election
Party	Candidate	Votes	%	±%
United Citizens	Glen Evans	17,705	61.66	+14.45
Independent	Ted Woolf	4,795	16.69	
Independent	Ron Marston	2,122	7.39	
Independent	Stephen Greenfield	1,997	6.95	
Independent	Nick Ursin	1,082	3.76	
Informal votes		1,012	3.52	−1.25
Majority		12,910	44.96	+28.08
Turnout		28,713	45.50	+14.50

=== Eastern Ward ===
The Eastern Ward elected three members to the Hutt City Council

Eastern Ward
Party	Candidate	Votes	%	±%
United Citizens	Mary Bannerman	4,359	61.40	
United Citizens	Roger Twentyman	4,294	60.48	
United Citizens	Teri Puketapu	3,640	51.27	
Labour	Alister Abernethy	2,940	41.41	
Labour	Michael Jameson	2,572	36.23	
Labour	Tu Taramai	1,404	19.77	
Independent	Nick Ursin	1,161	16.35	
Independent	Neil Butler	729	10.26	
Informal votes		198	2.78	
Turnout		7,099		

=== Harbour Ward ===
The Harbour Ward elected three members to the Hutt City Council

Harbour Ward
Party	Candidate	Votes	%	±%
United Citizens	Joy Baird	2,393	42.18	
Independent	Ted Woolf	2,337	41.20	
United Citizens	Roy Hewson	2,101	37.04	
Independent	Ross Jamieson	2,081	36.68	
United Citizens	Stephanie Lambert	1,792	31.59	
Independent	Maureen Freeman	1,490	26.26	
Independent	Godfrey Mann	1,309	23.07	
Independent	Jim Allen	1,238	21.82	
Independent	Ron Marston	922	16.25	
Independent	Jan Windleburn	796	14.03	
Labour	George Highfield	395	6.96	
Informal votes		162	2.85	
Turnout		5,672		

=== Northern Ward ===
The Northern Ward elected three members to the Hutt City Council

Northern Ward
Party	Candidate	Votes	%	±%
United Citizens	Pat Hall	4,513	92.63	
United Citizens	Peter Bates	4,428	90.88	
United Citizens	Pat Brosnan	4,423	90.78	
Independent	Maruhaeremuri Nihoniho	1,038	21.30	
Informal votes		214	4.39	
Turnout		4,872		

=== Wainuiomata Ward ===
The Wainuiomata Ward elected three members to the Hutt City Council

Wainuiomata Ward
Party	Candidate	Votes	%	±%
United Citizens	Betty Van Gaalen	3,163	70.95	
Independent	Tony London	2,322	52.08	
Independent	Len Little	1,671	37.48	
Independent	Bill McCabe	1,611	36.13	
Independent	Reg Moore	1,551	34.79	
Independent	Ray Wallace	1,275	28.60	
Independent	Willard Amaru	1,098	24.62	
Independent	Terence Bicknell	589	13.21	
Informal votes		96	2.15	
Turnout		4,458		

=== Western Ward ===
The Western Ward elected three members to the Hutt City Council

Western Ward
Party	Candidate	Votes	%	±%
United Citizens	Margaret Cousins	3,712	87.75	
United Citizens	Noeline Matthews	3,438	81.27	
United Citizens	Ted Gibbs	3,104	73.38	
Labour	John Eaton	2,292	54.18	
Informal votes		146	3.45	
Turnout		4,230		

== Wellington Regional Council ==
=== Lower Hutt Ward ===
The Lower Hutt Ward elected four members to the Wellington Regional Council

Lower Hutt Ward
Party	Candidate	Votes	%	±%
United Citizens	Glen Evans	18,415	72.44	
United Citizens	Betty Van Gaalen	16,903	66.49	
United Citizens	Alison Lawson	13,365	52.57	
United Citizens	Lawrie Woodley	11,931	46.93	
Labour	Alister Abernethy	6,972	27.42	
Independent	Jim Allen	6,446	25.35	
Green	Peter Carter	6,418	25.24	
Independent	Len Little	5,393	21.21	
Independent	Willard Amaru	5,125	20.16	
Labour	Michael Jameson	5,075	19.96	
Independent	Reg Moore	4,742	18.65	
Informal votes		900	3.54	
Turnout		25,421		

== Wellington Area Health Board ==
=== Lower Hutt Ward ===
The Lower Hutt Ward elected two members to the Wellington Area Health Board

Lower Hutt Ward
Party	Candidate	Votes	%	±%
United Citizens	Margaret Ryan	12,117	44.95	
United Citizens	Vera Ellen	10,630	39.43	
Labour	Diana East	8,944	33.18	
Labour	John Ryall	5,931	22.00	
Independent	Elvynne O'Connell	3,850	14.28	
Independent	Willard Amaru	3,164	11.73	
Independent	Richard Luke	2,809	10.42	
Independent	John Maxwell	2,507	9.30	
Independent	Terence Bicknell	2,285	8.47	
Informal votes		1,673	6.20	
Turnout		26,955		
