= 1995 Lower Hutt mayoral election =

- 14 October 1995
- Turnout: 29,453 (44.50%)
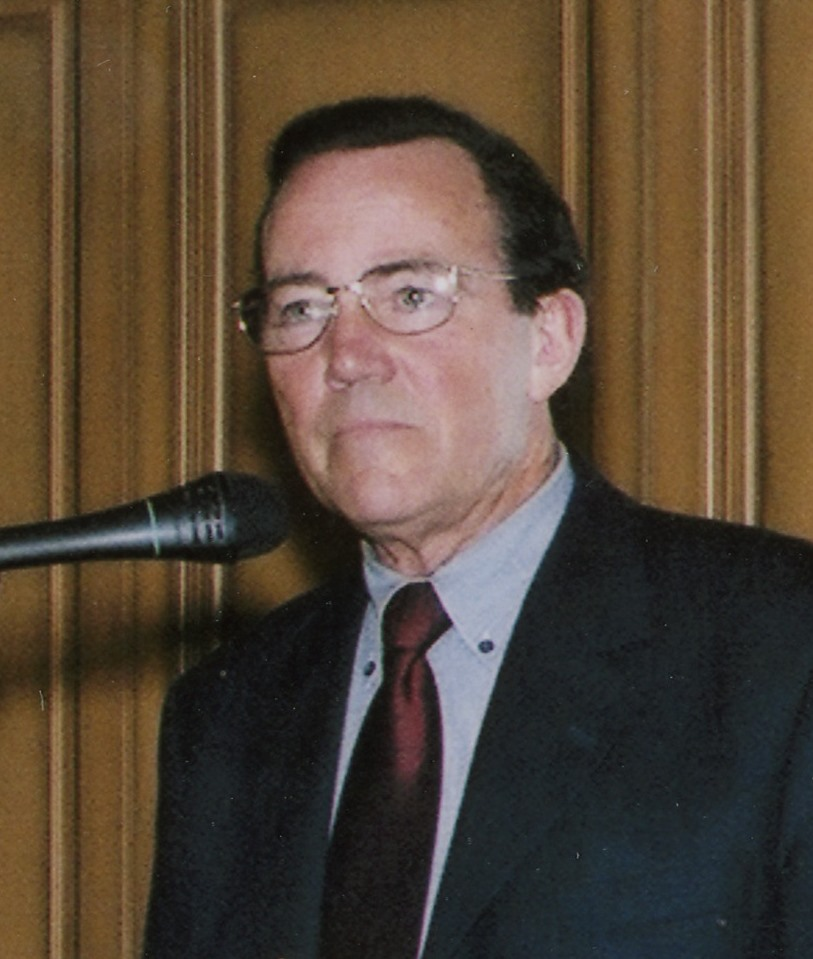

Candidate	John Terris	Peter Glensor
Party	Independent	Positive Focus
Popular vote	9,901	5,945
Percentage	33.61	20.18
Mayor before election
Glen Evans
Elected mayor
John Terris

The 1995 Lower Hutt mayoral election was part of the New Zealand local elections held that same year. The elections were held for the role of Mayor of Lower Hutt plus other local government positions including thirteen city councillors, also elected triennially. The polling was conducted using the standard first-past-the-post electoral method.

== Background and campaign ==
Candidates

Incumbent mayor of three terms Glen Evans did not stand for re-election. In an open race, a record seven candidates came forward for the mayoralty including:

- Jim Allen, councillor for the Harbour Ward since 1992
- Peter Glensor, clergyman and manager of the Hutt Union and Community Service
- Ross Jamieson, former Mayor of Eastbourne
- John Terris, former councillor from 1977 to 1989 and MP for Western Hutt from 1978 to 1990
- David "Chief" Walkinshaw, co-owner of a Petone restaurant
- Lawrie Woodley, councillor for the Western Ward since 1992 and runner-up at the previous mayoral election

Eastern Ward councillor John Egan also announced he would stand, but withdrew on grounds of ill-health.

Campaign

The main talking point of the election was the amount of debt the council had amassed, particularly the construction of the Central City Plaza car-parking building, which by the election totaled $102 million. Most candidates campaigned on better controlling spending to repay the debt including Glensor who opposed any asset sales or user charges increase for council services to fund debt reduction. Terris had been living in Wanganui as vicar at St Peter's Anglican parish but resigned in March 1995 and returned to Lower Hutt. Despite his long history with the Labour Party and brief affiliation with ACT New Zealand, Terris claimed to have discarded party politics, though was linked with the centre-right Citizens Action ticket who backed his candidacy. There was a shift away from organised political tickets and towards independents who won 11 of the 13 council seats. Two candidates from the Labour Party and Alliance backed Positive Focus ticket (including its mayoral candidate Peter Glensor) were elected while none of the Citizens Action candidates supporting Terris were elected to the council. Along with Glensor, two other mayoral candidates (Jamieson and Woodley) were elected to the council. The Evening Post wrote in an editorial that Terris' victory was "the greatest comeback since Lazarus."

This was the first election in Lower Hutt to use postal voting rather than polling booths. It was the last city in New Zealand to adopt postal ballots, a reaction to the record nationwide low of 25.3 percent in 1992. As a result, turnout increased by nearly 20 percent to 44.5 percent.

== Mayoral results ==
The following table gives the election results:

1995 Lower Hutt mayoral election
Party	Candidate	Votes	%	±%
Independent	John Terris	9,901	33.61	
Positive Focus	Peter Glensor	5,945	20.18	
Independent	Ross Jamieson	5,913	20.07	
Independent	Lawrie Woodley	3,416	11.59	−34.25
Independent	Jim Allen	2,295	7.79	
Independent	Colin Seymour	933	3.16	
Independent	David Walkinshaw	279	0.94	
Informal votes		771	2.61	+0.45
Majority		3,956	13.43	
Turnout		29,453	44.50	+19.20

== Ward results ==
Thirteen candidates were also elected from wards to the Hutt City Council.

Party/ticket	Councillors
Independent	11
Positive Focus	2

== Aftermath ==
After election day it was later revealed that the preliminary result count had been incorrect with vote tallies not including manually counted votes. They indicated that Glensor had finished second but he actually was third on election night trailing Jamieson as well as Terris. Glensor ended up being ahead of Jamieson in the final count, however Terris asked for a report from the chief returning officer to explain the error as well as several others including missing 1,000 votes in the preliminary count for regional council candidate Dick Werry and a computer failure on election night.
