= Margaret Magill =

New Zealand educator and politician

Margaret Magill MBE
- Born: Margaret Emma Magill; 1888; New Zealand
- Died: 6 November 1962 (aged 73); Wellington, New Zealand
- Other names: Maggie Magill, Rem Magill
- Occupation(s): educator, administrator, politician
- Years active: 1910–1961
- Known for: first woman president of the New Zealand Educational Institute
- Partner: Mimie Wood

Margaret Emma Magill MBE (1888 – 6 November 1962) was a teacher and school principal from New Zealand. She was the first woman to serve as the head of the New Zealand Educational Institute (NZEI) and served on the Eastbourne Borough Council, as well as serving as deputy mayor for multiple terms. She lived openly with her lesbian partner and was part of a lesbian circle which included her sister and the sister's partner as well.

== Biography ==
Margaret Magill was born in 1888 and entered the Wellington Teachers' Training College in 1906, earning her teaching certificate in 1910. She began her career teaching in infant schools and later became the principal of Thorndon Normal School. During her time on the NZEI board, heated discussions over whether five-year-olds should be given education and whether normal schools should be closed were debated. Magill, who felt early education was extremely important, served on the executive of the Wellington branch of the New Zealand Free Kindergarten Association for 12 years.

In 1926, Magill was elected to serve on the Executive Board of the New Zealand Educational Institute (NZEI). She became president in 1933, and her election to that post marked the first time it had been held by a woman. In 1931, Magill was elected to serve on the Eastbourne City Council and became its deputy mayor in 1933, serving two terms. She was re-elected to the deputy mayor post in 1938. At the 1938 election she had also stood for Mayor of Eastbourne, but was defeated by incumbent Wally Wise. In 1940, she was appointed as a Justice of the Peace for Eastbourne. She remained on the NZEI's executive until January 1945, when she retired both as a teacher and board member, but continued her service on the Eastbourne Council for nearly 30 years.

Magill, and her younger sister Ada were both openly lesbian. They and their partners formed a small community in Eastbourne on Mahoe Street. Magill's partner, Mimie Wood (1888–1979), with whom she lived from 1920 until her death, was the accountant, librarian, and secretary for the Royal Society of New Zealand for 42 years. The couple's home was located at 25 Mahoe Street, near Ada (1890–1976) and her partner Molly Gore's home. Other members of their friendship circle included couples Daisy Isaacs and Amy Kane, and Rhoda Messenger and Dora Johnson. Each of the ladies was a member of either the Lyceum Club or the Pioneer Club, a feminist and temperance organisation. Together they founded the East Harbour Women's Club in 1948, for which Magill served as president for the next 13 years.

In addition to her club affiliations, Magill served on the executive board of the Red Cross, travelling to international conferences in support of their work. She was also involved in the pacifist movement and was a strong supporter of disarmament. In 1953, Magill was awarded the Queen Elizabeth II Coronation Medal, and she was appointed a Member of the Order of the British Empire, for social welfare services, in the 1956 Queen's Birthday Honours.

== Death and legacy ==
Magill died on 6 November 1962, aged 73, and her ashes were buried in Karori Cemetery. At the time of her death, only one other woman had served as president of NZEI.
