= Mayoral elections in Eastbourne =

Elections were held at regular times in Eastbourne, New Zealand, from its proclamation as a borough in 1905 to its abolition in 1989. Elections were held annually until 1915 when two year terms were introduced which lasted until 1935 when the mayoral term was extended to three years. The polling was conducted using the standard first-past-the-post electoral method.

== Election results ==
=== 1906 election ===
1906 Eastbourne mayoral election
| Party | Candidate | Votes | % | ±% |
|---|---|---|---|---|
| Independent | Fred Bolton | 225 | 63.02 | |
| Independent | John Coombe | 93 | 26.05 | |
| Independent | Henry Savage | 39 | 10.92 | |
| Majority | | 132 | 36.97 | |
| Turnout | | 357 | | |

=== 1907 election ===
Fred Bolton was re-elected mayor unopposed.

=== 1908 election ===
Fred Bolton was re-elected mayor unopposed.

=== 1909 election ===
1909 Eastbourne mayoral election
| Party | Candidate | Votes | % | ±% |
|---|---|---|---|---|
| Independent | John Barr | 182 | 50.98 | |
| Independent | Herbert William Shortt | 172 | 48.17 | |
| Informal votes | | 3 | 0.84 | |
| Majority | | 10 | 2.80 | |
| Turnout | | 357 | | |

=== 1910 election ===
1910 Eastbourne mayoral election
| Party | Candidate | Votes | % | ±% |
|---|---|---|---|---|
| Independent | Herbert William Shortt | 240 | 64.69 | +16.52 |
| Independent | William Hobbs | 131 | 35.31 | |
| Majority | | 109 | 29.38 | |
| Turnout | | 371 | | |

=== 1911 election ===
1911 Eastbourne mayoral election
| Party | Candidate | Votes | % | ±% |
|---|---|---|---|---|
| Independent | Herbert William Shortt | 340 | 57.92 | −6.77 |
| Independent | David Robertson | 247 | 42.07 | |
| Majority | | 93 | 15.84 | |
| Turnout | | 587 | | |

=== 1912 election ===
1912 Eastbourne mayoral election
| Party | Candidate | Votes | % | ±% |
|---|---|---|---|---|
| Independent | Herbert William Shortt | 190 | 59.56 | +1.64 |
| Independent | William Hobbs | 129 | 40.43 | |
| Majority | | 61 | 19.12 | |
| Turnout | | 319 | | |

=== 1913 election ===
William John Organ was elected mayor unopposed.

=== 1914 election ===
William John Organ was re-elected mayor unopposed.

=== 1915 election ===
James Patrick Kelly was elected mayor unopposed.

=== 1917 election ===
Phineas Levi was elected mayor unopposed.

=== 1919 election ===
1919 Eastbourne mayoral election
| Party | Candidate | Votes | % | ±% |
|---|---|---|---|---|
| Independent | Francis Henry Mather | 314 | 52.95 | |
| Independent | Phineas Levi | 201 | 33.89 | |
| Independent | Charles Russell | 72 | 12.14 | |
| Informal votes | | 6 | 1.01 | |
| Majority | | 113 | 19.05 | |
| Turnout | | 593 | | |

=== 1920 by-election ===
1920 Eastbourne mayoral by-election
| Party | Candidate | Votes | % | ±% |
|---|---|---|---|---|
| Independent | Francis Henry Mather | 229 | 53.01 | +0.06 |
| Independent | Phineas Levi | 202 | 46.76 | +12.87 |
| Informal votes | | 1 | 0.23 | −0.78 |
| Majority | | 27 | 6.25 | −12.80 |
| Turnout | | 432 | | |

=== 1921 election ===
Francis Henry Mather was re-elected mayor unopposed.

=== 1923 election ===
Francis Henry Mather was re-elected mayor unopposed.

=== 1924 election ===
Herbert William Shortt was elected mayor in the absence of Francis Henry Mather who was suffering from ill health.

=== 1925 election ===
1925 Eastbourne mayoral election
| Party | Candidate | Votes | % | ±% |
|---|---|---|---|---|
| Independent | Henry Morgan Jones | 459 | 55.31 | |
| Independent | Archibald Walker | 369 | 44.45 | |
| Informal votes | | 2 | 0.24 | |
| Majority | | 90 | 10.84 | |
| Turnout | | 830 | | |

=== 1927 election ===
Henry Morgan Jones was re-elected mayor unopposed.

=== 1929 election ===
Henry Morgan Jones was re-elected mayor unopposed.

=== 1931 election ===
Sam Fisher was elected mayor unopposed.

=== 1933 election ===
1933 Eastbourne mayoral election
| Party | Candidate | Votes | % | ±% |
|---|---|---|---|---|
| Independent | Wally Wise | 617 | 56.65 | |
| Independent | Sam Fisher | 465 | 42.69 | |
| Informal votes | | 7 | 0.64 | |
| Majority | | 152 | 13.95 | |
| Turnout | | 1,089 | | |

=== 1935 election ===
Wally Wise was re-elected mayor unopposed.

=== 1938 election ===
1938 Eastbourne mayoral election
| Party | Candidate | Votes | % | ±% |
|---|---|---|---|---|
| Independent | Wally Wise | 784 | 63.89 | |
| Independent | Margaret Magill | 438 | 35.69 | |
| Informal votes | | 5 | 0.40 | |
| Majority | | 346 | 28.19 | |
| Turnout | | 1,227 | | |

=== 1941 election ===
Wally Wise was re-elected mayor unopposed.

=== 1944 election ===
1944 Eastbourne mayoral election
| Party | Candidate | Votes | % | ±% |
|---|---|---|---|---|
| Independent | Wally Wise | 738 | 59.90 | |
| Independent | Sam Fisher | 484 | 39.28 | |
| Informal votes | | 10 | 0.81 | |
| Majority | | 274 | 22.24 | |
| Turnout | | 1,232 | | |

=== 1947 election ===
1947 Eastbourne mayoral election
| Party | Candidate | Votes | % | ±% |
|---|---|---|---|---|
| Independent | Wally Wise | 796 | 55.82 | −4.08 |
| Independent | Alister Hunter MacAndrew | 557 | 39.07 | |
| Informal votes | | 73 | 5.11 | +4.30 |
| Majority | | 239 | 16.76 | −5.48 |
| Turnout | | 1,426 | | |

=== 1950 election ===
1950 Eastbourne mayoral election
| Party | Candidate | Votes | % | ±% |
|---|---|---|---|---|
| Independent | Cliff Bishop | 1,025 | 74.59 | |
| Independent | Wally Wise | 349 | 25.40 | −30.42 |
| Majority | | 676 | 49.19 | |
| Turnout | | 1,374 | | |

=== 1953 election ===
Cliff Bishop was re-elected mayor unopposed.

=== 1956 election ===
Cliff Bishop was re-elected mayor unopposed.

=== 1959 election ===
Cliff Bishop was re-elected mayor unopposed.

=== 1962 election ===
Cliff Bishop was re-elected mayor unopposed.

=== 1965 election ===
1965 Eastbourne mayoral election
| Party | Candidate | Votes | % | ±% |
|---|---|---|---|---|
| Independent | Cliff Bishop | 1,373 | 66.68 | |
| Independent | John Stannus Stichbury | 686 | 33.32 | |
| Majority | | 687 | 33.36 | |
| Turnout | | 2,059 | | |

=== 1968 election ===
Cliff Bishop was re-elected mayor unopposed.

=== 1971 election ===
Cliff Bishop was re-elected mayor unopposed.

=== 1974 election ===
1974 Eastbourne mayoral election
| Party | Candidate | Votes | % | ±% |
|---|---|---|---|---|
| Independent | Cliff Bishop | 1,458 | 55.75 | |
| Independent | Alan Souness | 1,149 | 43.94 | |
| Informal votes | | 8 | 0.31 | |
| Majority | | 309 | 11.81 | |
| Turnout | | 2,615 | | |

=== 1977 election ===
Cliff Bishop was re-elected mayor unopposed.

=== 1980 election ===
1980 Eastbourne mayoral election
| Party | Candidate | Votes | % | ±% |
|---|---|---|---|---|
| Independent | Elaine Jakobsson | 1,170 | 52.73 | |
| Independent | Malcolm James Burdan | 1,049 | 47.27 | |
| Majority | | 121 | 5.45 | |
| Turnout | | 2,219 | | |

=== 1983 election ===
Elaine Jakobsson was re-elected mayor unopposed.

=== 1986 election ===
1986 Eastbourne mayoral election
| Party | Candidate | Votes | % | ±% |
|---|---|---|---|---|
| Independent | Charles Bagnall | 1,142 | 60.40 | |
| Independent | Barry Cranston | 749 | 39.60 | |
| Majority | | 393 | 20.78 | |
| Turnout | | 1,891 | 57.00 | |

=== 1988 by-election ===
1988 Eastbourne mayoral by-election
| Party | Candidate | Votes | % | ±% |
|---|---|---|---|---|
| Independent | Ross Jamieson | 891 | 43.56 | |
| Independent | Ray Smith | 411 | 20.09 | |
| Independent | Joy Baird | 375 | 18.33 | |
| Independent | Barry Cranston | 243 | 11.88 | |
| Independent | Jock Young | 82 | 4.00 | |
| Independent | Jim Allen | 43 | 2.10 | |
| Majority | | 480 | 23.47 | |
| Turnout | | 2,045 | 58.80 | +1.80 |
