= 1992 Hutt City Council election =

Local elections in New Zealand

- 10 October 1992
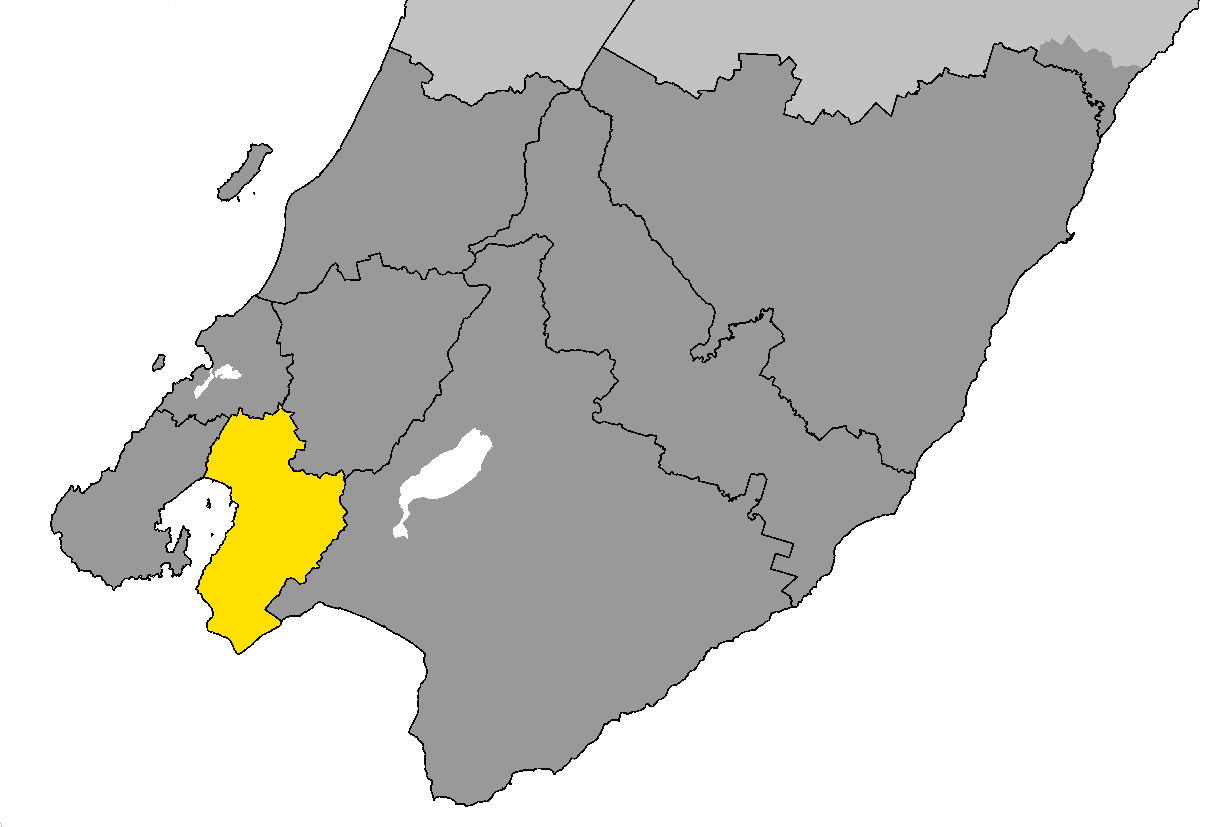
- Position of Lower Hutt within the Wellington Region

The 1992 Hutt City Council election was part of the 1992 New Zealand local elections, to elect members to sub-national councils and boards. The Hutt City elections covered one regional council (the Wellington Regional Council), city council and various local boards and licensing trusts. The polling was conducted using the standard first-past-the-post electoral method.

== Hutt City Council ==
=== Mayor ===
1992 Lower Hutt mayoral election
Party	Candidate	Votes	%	±%
United Citizens	Glen Evans	7,651	46.62	−15.04
Community Concern	Lawrie Woodley	7,523	45.84	
Independent	Rachael Umaga	881	5.36	
Informal votes		356	2.16	−1.36
Majority		128	0.77	−44.19
Turnout		16,411	25.30	−20.20

=== Eastern Ward ===
The Eastern Ward elected three members to the Hutt City Council

Eastern Ward
Party	Candidate	Votes	%	±%
United Citizens	Roger Twentyman	1,698	41.51	−18.97
Community Concern	Joan Monrad	1,629	39.82	
Community Concern	John Egan	1,624	39.70	
United Citizens	Teri Puketapu	1,553	37.97	−13.30
Community Concern	Colin Seymour	1,445	35.33	
United Citizens	Michael Rumble	1,274	31.14	
Labour	Dick Werry	1,231	30.09	
Labour	David Strutton	755	18.45	
Labour	Ema Weepu	629	15.37	
Independent	Nick Ursin	384	9.38	
Informal votes		50	1.22	−1.56
Turnout		4,090		

=== Harbour Ward ===
The Harbour Ward elected three members to the Hutt City Council

Harbour Ward
Party	Candidate	Votes	%	±%
Independent	Ted Woolf	1,352	40.29	−0.91
United Citizens	Joy Baird	1,309	39.01	−3.17
Independent	Jim Allen	1,195	35.61	+13.79
United Citizens	Roy Hewson	1,176	35.05	−1.99
Independent	Doreen Doolan	1,062	31.65	
Independent	Maureen Freeman	872	25.99	
United Citizens	Lorraine Williams	859	25.60	
Community Concern	Douglas Cowley	794	23.66	
Community Concern	John Bhula	718	21.40	
Community Concern	John O'Callaghan	641	19.10	
Informal votes		88	2.62	−0.23
Turnout		3,355		

=== Northern Ward ===
The Northern Ward elected three members to the Hutt City Council

Northern Ward
Party	Candidate	Votes	%	±%
United Citizens	Pat Brosnan	1,230	43.35	−47.43
Community Concern	Angus Finlayson	1,152	40.60	
United Citizens	Peter Bates	1,147	40.43	−50.45
Community Concern	Diana East	1,114	39.26	
United Citizens	Pat Hall	1,109	39.09	−53.54
Community Concern	Vincent Thompson	836	29.46	
Labour	Alfred Banks	784	27.63	
Labour	Linda Tenamu	597	21.04	
Labour	Joseph Rickit	517	18.22	
Informal votes		26	0.91	−3.48
Turnout		2,837		

=== Wainuiomata Ward ===
The Wainuiomata Ward elected three members to the Hutt City Council

Wainuiomata Ward
Party	Candidate	Votes	%	±%
Independent	Betty Van Gaalen	1,684	78.61	+7.66
Independent	Len Little	1,352	63.11	+25.63
Independent	Tony London	1,284	59.94	+7.86
Independent	Reg Moore	1,086	50.70	+15.91
Independent	Ossie Renata	980	45.75	
Informal votes		40	1.86	−0.29
Turnout		2,142		

=== Western Ward ===
The Western Ward elected three members to the Hutt City Council

Western Ward
Party	Candidate	Votes	%	±%
United Citizens	Margaret Cousins	1,593	55.81	−31.94
Community Concern	Lawrie Woodley	1,590	55.71	
Community Concern	Graeme Ross	1,325	46.42	
United Citizens	Peter Barlow	1,280	44.84	
United Citizens	Noeline Matthews	1,230	43.09	−38.18
Community Concern	Bruce Meech	1,182	41.41	
Independent	Glen Watt	326	11.42	
Informal votes		36	1.26	−2.19
Turnout		2,854		

== Wellington Regional Council ==
=== Lower Hutt Ward ===
The Lower Hutt Ward elected four members to the Wellington Regional Council

Lower Hutt Ward
Party	Candidate	Votes	%	±%
Community Concern	Sandra Greig	6,543	46.56	
Community Concern	David Ogden	5,494	39.10	
United Citizens	Alison Lawson	5,367	38.19	−14.38
United Citizens	Helen Thorstenson	5,225	37.18	
United Citizens	Ross Jamieson	5,010	35.65	
Labour	Bill Werry	4,724	33.62	
Labour	Robert Moffat	4,074	28.99	
Alliance	Peter Waring	2,777	19.76	
Alliance	John Olsen	2,144	15.25	
Informal votes		796	5.66	+2.12
Turnout		14,051		
