= Theatre New Zealand =

- Formation: 1970
- Founder: Olga Estelle Harding
- Purpose: Support and advocate for amateur theatre societies in Aotearoa, New Zealand
- Website: https://www.theatrenewzealand.co.nz/
- Formerly called: New Zealand Theatre Federation

Theatre New Zealand (TNZ), formally known as the New Zealand Theatre Federation (NZTF) is an umbrella organisation to support and advocate for their membership of community theatre, amateur societies and schools. Theatre New Zealand have been running since 1970. They provide services in education, training and research. They organise TheatreFest an annual one act play competition with regional and national events and create a regular newsletter called Backchat.

== History ==
The organisation formed as New Zealand Theatre Federation (NZTF) in 1970 taking over from the British Drama League (New Zealand Branch; established in 1932) and the New Zealand Drama Council (established in 1945). In 2018 they changed their name to Theatre New Zealand. Deputy principal of Wellington Girls' College Olga Estelle Harding was the national president of the New Zealand Branch British Drama League 1964-1970, and then the New Zealand Theatre Federation from 1980-1983.

In 1995 they became fully volunteer as an organisation with the closure of the national office and the paid role of executive officer Doug Clarke ceased, forums were held to determine possible future changes including amalgamating with the New Zealand Society of Musical Theatre. It was also raised the need to clarify the vision so people knew what they were getting for the membership.

Their mission statement became in 1996: "To provide all New Zealanders in every community the opportunity to either actively participate in or to support recreational theatre."

The Festival of Community Theatre was held in 1995 in seven districts and 50 plays were presented, although these the numbers were down from the past year.

== Organisation ==
Theatre New Zealand is registered with the Charities Commission. It has a volunteer committee of organisers. The management of the affairs of the federation is entrusted to a National Executive consisting of a President, Vice President, Secretary, Treasurer and six Executive Members all elected at the Annual General Meeting. Membership of the Theatre New Zealand consists of approximately 100 groups around Aotearoa New Zealand. People who have had a position on the executive include Jade Gillies (2015 vice president). Ewen Coleman was elected a Life Member in 1996 after being the president for some time.

The membership of Theatre New Zealand is largely drawn from amateur theatre societies (often called community theatre in New Zealand) who rehearse and present plays to their communities usually in their own buildings. Around the country the value of property and buildings is several million dollars. Programmes presented include a mixture of international plays from English speaking authors, and New Zealand work. In 2014 the New Zealand playwright agency Playmarket issued nearly 100 licenses to community theatre for New Zealand plays.

Some people who work professionally in theatre started out with community theatres at a 'grass-roots' level and Theatre New Zealand runs training with professional tutors.

Jennifer Ward-Lealand is a patron of Theatre New Zealand.

Over time different pressures have occurred amongst the membership and in 2011 Ewen Coleman described a dwindling 'pool of core people' where people are not able to commit as volunteers to more than one show a year, that has showed up particular in a lack of directors and people to build sets.

== Activities ==
Annual competition called TheatreFest, and a regular newsletter called Backchat: news from the New Zealand Theatre Federation Inc.

=== TheatreFest ===
TheatreFest is formally known as the One Act Play Festival and also Festival of Community Theatre. It is an annual one act play competition which often has new plays written for it. Theatre groups compete for a series of awards and they "progress through the competition, starting at the local levels, then a regional final, and then the national final". Some schools take part and use is as part of assessment for students.

In 1970s some of the winner were play's Mr Bones and Mr Jones by Eve Hughes (winner 1970) and Irish Case in Brief by Elizabeth Moir (winner 1972).

The 2013 winner of Best Production was The Carousel produced by Hamilton Playbox Theatre that went on to perform at the Hamilton Gardens Arts Festival in 2014 and reviewed: "by-and-large a well-rehearsed piece of solid silliness and light entertainment" (Jan-Maree Franicevic 2014).

In 2015 three groups from Dunedin, one from Queenstown and two from Invercargill entered the Otago-Southland competition un by the Invercargill Repertory Society. Director of Fortune Theatre in Dunedin, Lara Macgregor, adjudicated. The national competition was in Hamilton in September and had the top six to eight acts from both South and North Island regional finals competing.
