= Mimie Wood =

New Zealand secretary, accountant and librarian

Mimie Wood MBE
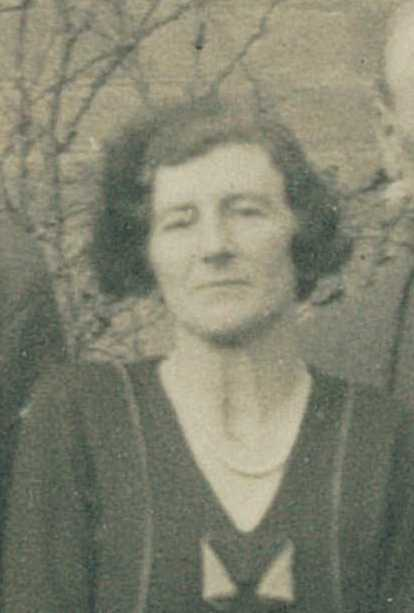
- Wood in 1934
- Born: Susan Selina Wood; 4 December 1888; Dunedin, New Zealand
- Died: 25 August 1979 (aged 90); Bowen Hospital, Crofton Downs, Wellington, New Zealand
- Occupations: Secretary, accountant and librarian
- Years active: 1920–1962
- Employer: Royal Society Te Apārangi
- Known for: One of the Royal Society Te Apārangi's 150 women in 150 words
- Partner: Margaret Magill

Susan Selina "Mimie" Wood MBE (4 December 1888 – 25 August 1979) was a New Zealand secretary, accountant, and librarian for the Royal Society of New Zealand. She was employed by the organisation from 1920 until her retirement in 1962. Coleridge Farr, president of the New Zealand Institute from 1929 to 1931, said of her that it would be more accurate to describe her as the institute's assistant president. She carried a large administrative load at the Royal Society and correctly predicted that upon her retirement, she would be replaced by five people; those five positions were established within three years of her departure.

From 1920 until shortly before her death, Wood lived in Eastbourne with her partner, Margaret Magill. There, they were part of a circle of lesbian friends at a time when it was highly unusual to be openly lesbian. They were both very active in the community and both were appointed members of the Order of the British Empire. Wood co-founded a number of community groups and usually served on committees, holding positions with those groups for decades. She was elected fellow of two societies.

== Early life ==
Wood was born in 1888 in Dunedin. She was christened as Susan Selina Wood at the Anglican St Peter's Church in Caversham. She never used her birth name, not even on official documents, but always signed as Mimie Wood. Her parents were Edwin Thomas and Susan Sophia Wood (née Toomey).

Wood received her education at schools in various Dunedin suburbs: Wakari, Kaikorai, and then at Dunedin Normal School in Dunedin North. She did not receive a secondary school education. Her father, who was an accountancy tutor, also taught writing and was a designer. He announced one day that he would teach calligraphy to Mimie and make her "the best in New Zealand". Her handwritten minutes that she would take in copperplate script were testimony to her father's teaching. She attended Knox Church in George Street, and for some time she taught bible classes there. She knew John Marwick in Dunedin, who would later become a palaeontologist and geologist. It is thought that she knew George Thomson through Knox Church.

Edwin Wood died in 1918 and Susan Wood in 1925; both her parents died in their home town Dunedin.

== Professional career ==
Wood took her first job at the Athenaeum in The Octagon, where she catalogued books using the Dewey Decimal Classification. Her next employment was in the office of the hardware merchants Paterson & Barr Ltd in Princes Street. At some time before 1919, she moved to Wellington, where her first role was as an assistant accountant to a large commercial business.

The New Zealand Institute decided in 1919 that they needed to employ a permanent paid official as the workload for their honorary officials had become too time-consuming. The Board of Governors gave authority to the Standing Committee to employ someone for a salary not exceeding NZ£200. Tasks to fulfill were to act as assistant secretary, assistant treasurer, assistant editor, assistant librarian, compile indexes for the institute's Transactions and cards for the International Catalogue of Scientific Literature. In May 1920, the Standing Committee tasked the institute's president—Thomas Easterfield—with appointing the right person. Wood received the appointment in August 1920 and Thomson, who had been the institute's president in 1907 and 1908, was instrumental in her getting the job. At the beginning of the Great Depression, her salary was cut in line with the blanket salary cut for civil servants. Geophysicist Coleridge Farr, who was the institute's president at the time, pointed out that Wood had put him right on many occasions in her "usual cheerful manner" where he would otherwise have gone wrong, and that her title of an assistant was not correct, as she was the institute's secretary. Farr suggested that if the word "assistant" was required, "a more just title would be 'assistant president'." At the subsequent 1931 annual general meeting, Thomson moved that Wood's title be changed to the secretary. Wood had a deep admiration for Thomson and kept his portrait in her bedroom all her life.

The honorary secretary of the institute was the chemist Bernard Aston from 1908 to 1925, but after a while in the role, Wood replaced Aston. Wood interacted more with Aston than any other board member. Wood is regarded as having dedicated her life to the Royal Society. She was well-liked, exceedingly helpful, and trusted with many confidential matters, as she was discreet. Journalists recorded how helpful she was to them when they reported from meetings of the institute's board. Wood got on well with all board members and presidents, with the exception of botanist Leonard Cockayne (president from 1918 to 1920 immediately prior to Wood's appointment), who was known for his brusque manner. When Wood attended a committee meeting, taking notes on the request of Aston, Cockayne asked: "What is SHE doing here?" Wood never forgave him and late in life noted that: "Despite all his honours he was the rudest man I ever met."

The New Zealand Institute had to move from the wooden Dominion Museum as the Public Works Department would not allow further bookshelves to be installed over a concern of excessive weight. Professor Harry Kirk, who was the institute's president at the time, arranged that the institute could move into the Hunter Building. Three libraries—of the New Zealand Institute, the Dominion Museum, and the Wellington Philosophical Society—had been held at the Dominion Museum and it took the officers of the institute plus three men from the Public Works Department one week to relocate all the books in November 1922. There were great difficulties separating the libraries and when Wood relocated to the Hunter Building on 6 June 1923, much of the work was still to be done. Wood completed the remaining work practically by herself and showed "competent energy and determination". She received special recognition in the 1924 Transactions.

By 1947, Wood's salary had increased to NZ£425. From 1950, she was assisted by a part-time librarian. In May 1962, Wood asked to go into retirement. The society's council arranged for six months' paid leave and an NZ£500 bonus, perhaps in recognition that she did not have a superannuation scheme but also as an acknowledgement that she had been employed "for a pittance". Charles Fleming, who was president when she retired and who later wrote her obituary, said that there was no prospect of employing somebody on similar terms. At a leaving function on 28 November, she was presented with a silver tray. Few of the attendees knew that Wood's partner of 42 years had died just three weeks earlier; her partner's illness was the reason for Wood asking to retire.

Wood carried a large administrative burden at the Royal Society, with the meetings of the council a particularly busy period. Exhausted after one of those meetings, she once exclaimed to the assistant librarian: "When I leave this job, you mark my words, five people will replace me." She was correct: by 1965—three years after Wood's retirement—the Royal Society was employing a general secretary, an executive officer, an office assistant, a librarian, and a library assistant.

== Private life ==
When Wood came to Wellington, she first lived in Lyall Bay and in 1920, she moved to Eastbourne, New Zealand, where she remained for the rest of her life. There was a community of female couples in Eastbourne that was an early example of lesbian community in New Zealand. Wood lived with Margaret Magill, a teacher, from 1920 until Magill's death. Magill's younger sister Ada and her partner, Molly Gore, were part of the group.

Magill and Wood set up the Eastbourne Horticultural Society (originally called the East Harbour Society), with Wood calling an inaugural meeting on 1 March 1938 via a flyer that she distributed to residents. They attracted Elizabeth Gilmer, who was chair of the Wellington Horticultural Society, as patron for their society, Magill was the inaugural vice-president, and Wood the inaugural honorary secretary-treasurer. The society's first show was held in September 1938. The September 1941 show was attended by Cyril Newall, who earlier that year had been appointed governor-general of New Zealand. Wood remained the society's secretary-treasurer until 1970, when she was elected honorary member. She also held memberships with the Hutt Valley and East Harbour Rose Society (where she was on the council), and the Floral Art Society.

In 1939, Wood became joint secretary when an Eastbourne group was formed to arrange the local contribution towards the Wellington Provincial Centennial Memorial. Wood was also secretary of the Eastbourne Lyric Group, a group that she had founded in 1937.

In 1948, Wood was one of the founders of the East Harbour Women's Club. From 1947 to 1975, she was the honorary secretary for the Eastbourne branch of the Red Cross.

In her final year, she developed blood clots in her legs. She remained bed-ridden at Bowen Hospital in Crofton Downs even after an operation. She died on 25 August 1979.

== Awards and recognition ==
In 1933, Wood was a founding member of the New Zealand Institute of Chartered Secretaries. She was admitted a fellow of the organisation (FCSNZ) and after the 1953 merger with the Institute of Chartered Secretaries and Administrators, the honorifics changed to FCIS (fellow of the Chartered Institute of Secretaries). In 1963, she was elected fellow of the Royal New Zealand Institute of Horticulture (FRNZIH). In the 1963 New Year Honours, she was appointed member of the Order of the British Empire (MBE) for her services as secretary of the Royal Society of New Zealand. In 2017, Wood was selected as one of the Royal Society Te Apārangi's 150 women in 150 words.
