= 1992 Lower Hutt mayoral election =

- 10 October 1992
- Turnout: 16,411 (25.30%)

Candidate	Glen Evans	Lawrie Woodley
Party	United Citizens	Community Concern
Popular vote	7,651	7,523
Percentage	46.62	45.84
Mayor before election
Glen Evans
Elected mayor
Glen Evans

The 1992 Lower Hutt mayoral election was part of the New Zealand local elections held that same year. The elections were held for the role of Mayor of Lower Hutt plus other local government positions including fifteen city councillors, also elected triennially. The polling was conducted using the standard first-past-the-post electoral method.

== Background ==
A council decision to build the Central City Plaza car-parking building in Queens Drive was the dominant issue of the election. Mayor Glen Evans argued that the plaza would attract people to the south end of High Street and assist smaller retailers compete with Queensgate Mall. The cost of constructing the plaza sky-rocketed causing the council to find itself in severe financial strife, costing more than $35 million to design and build while only being valued at $13 million. A new ticket, Community Concern, was set up in opposition to Evans and his policies headed by former councillor Lawrie Woodley. The Labour Party did not contest the mayoralty for the second consecutive election and only ran candidates in two wards (none were elected).

Evans, was re-elected very narrowly and his United Citizens ticket lost their large majority of council seats. Evans had an election night lead of only 103 over Woodley with over 500 special votes still to be counted. Woodley said he was confident of overturning the margin, but the final count slightly extended Evans' majority to 128. Woodley was elected in the Western Ward and four other candidates from his Community Concern ticket were also elected to the council. Turnout for the election was a record low with barely one quarter of electors voting (the lowest anywhere in the country). Lower Hutt was the only place in New Zealand to still use polling booths rather than postal voting which Evans thought was a cause of comparatively low turnout. He stated that elections would switch to postal voting.

== Mayoral results ==
The following table gives the election results:

1992 Lower Hutt mayoral election
Party	Candidate	Votes	%	±%
United Citizens	Glen Evans	7,651	46.62	−15.04
Community Concern	Lawrie Woodley	7,523	45.84	
Independent	Rachael Umaga	881	5.36	
Informal votes		356	2.16	−1.36
Majority		128	0.77	−44.19
Turnout		16,411	25.30	−20.20

== Ward results ==
Fifteen candidates were also elected from wards to the Hutt City Council.

Party/ticket	Councillors
United Citizens	5
Community Concern	5
Independent	5
