= 1986 Lower Hutt mayoral election =

Local election in New Zealand

- 11 October 1986
- Turnout: 13,729 (31.00%)

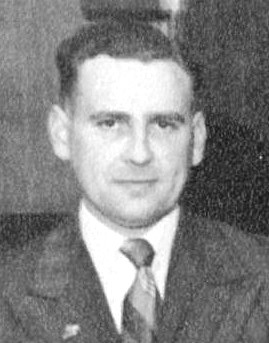

Candidate	Glen Evans	Alister Abernethy	Gerald Bond
Party	United Citizens	Labour	Combined Progressive
Popular vote	6,482	4,164	2,770
Percentage	47.21	30.32	20.17
Mayor before election
Sir John Kennedy-Good
Elected mayor
Glen Evans

The 1986 Lower Hutt mayoral election was part of the New Zealand local elections held that same year. The elections were held for the role of Mayor of Lower Hutt plus other local government positions including sixteen city councillors, also elected triennially. The polling was conducted using the standard first-past-the-post electoral method.

== Background ==
The incumbent Mayor, Sir John Kennedy-Good, retired leaving an open race. The United Citizens' chose former councillor Glen Evans over sitting councillor Gerald Bond to replace Kennedy-Good to lead the ticket. This caused a rift and Bond split from the United Citizens' to form his own Combined Progressive ticket. Labour's candidate from the previous election, councillor Alister Abernethy, contested the mayoralty again.

The United Citizens won in a landslide with majority of councillors and Evans winning the mayoralty against Abernethy in second. Bond came a distant third for mayor and lost his council and energy board seat. All of his ticket (which included several incumbents) were defeated. Evans was expecting a closer result and had thought Bond would be a close second.

== Mayoral results ==
1986 Lower Hutt mayoral election
Party	Candidate	Votes	%	±%
United Citizens	Glen Evans	6,482	47.21	
Labour	Alister Abernethy	4,164	30.32	+6.67
Combined Progressive	Gerald Bond	2,770	20.17	
Informal votes		313	2.27	+0.83
Majority		2,318	16.88	
Turnout		13,729	31.00	−11.00

== Councillor results ==
1986 Lower Hutt City Council election
Party	Candidate	Votes	%	±%
Labour	John Terris	6,429	53.44	−7.03
United Citizens	Teri Puketapu	6,297	52.34	−3.35
United Citizens	Lawrie Woodley	6,271	52.13	+0.95
United Citizens	Lucy Cole	6,252	51.97	−5.14
United Citizens	Roger Twentyman	6,117	50.85	−2.19
Labour	Alister Abernethy	6,076	50.51	+1.41
United Citizens	Margaret Cousins	6,055	50.33	−0.11
United Citizens	Ted Gibbs	6,004	49.91	+1.13
United Citizens	Errol Baird	5,871	48.80	+2.03
United Citizens	Pat Hall	5,857	48.69	+6.10
United Citizens	Mary Bannerman	5,232	43.49	
United Citizens	Alison Lawson	5,164	42.92	
United Citizens	Peter Bates	4,992	41.49	
United Citizens	Margaret Ryan	4,933	41.00	
United Citizens	Pat Brosnan	4,785	39.77	
United Citizens	Noeline Matthews	4,538	37.72	
United Citizens	David Milson	4,529	37.65	
Labour	Ida Patel	4,411	36.67	
Labour	John Eaton	4,410	36.66	−4.18
Labour	Neville Pickering	4,384	36.44	−5.35
Combined Progressive	Gerald Bond	4,374	36.36	−19.33
Labour	Shirley Wilde	4,322	35.92	
Labour	Brenda Howell	4,320	35.91	
Labour	Richard Luke	4,241	35.25	−4.01
Labour	Peggy Clement	4,203	34.94	
Labour	J.B. Munro	4,093	34.02	
United Citizens	Joan Monrad	4,050	33.66	
Labour	Tafa Malifa-Poutoa	3,952	32.85	−1.96
Labour	Patrick Braid	3,869	32.16	
Labour	John Collyns	3,862	32.10	
Labour	David Taylor	3,776	31.39	−6.09
Labour	Bryan Mockridge	3,650	30.34	
Labour	Tu Taramai	3,581	29.76	
Combined Progressive	Chen Werry	3,307	27.49	−20.32
Combined Progressive	Lois Riseley	3,285	27.30	−28.02
Combined Progressive	Govind Bhula	2,733	22.72	
Combined Progressive	Pat Fraser	2,416	20.08	
Combined Progressive	Mollie Brown	2,321	19.29	
Combined Progressive	Jim Allen	2,115	17.58	
Combined Progressive	Russell Kerr	2,043	16.98	
Combined Progressive	Bruce Hayward	1,967	16.35	
Combined Progressive	Ronald Campbell	1,872	15.56	
Combined Progressive	Berwyn Gibbons	1,781	14.80	
Combined Progressive	Tony Sutcliffe	1,754	14.58	
Combined Progressive	Roger Wills	1,739	14.45	
Combined Progressive	Bill East	1,665	13.84	
Combined Progressive	Cornelius Anderson	1,525	12.67	
Combined Progressive	Seela Pea-Wall	1,042	8.66	
