= British Drama League (New Zealand Branch) =

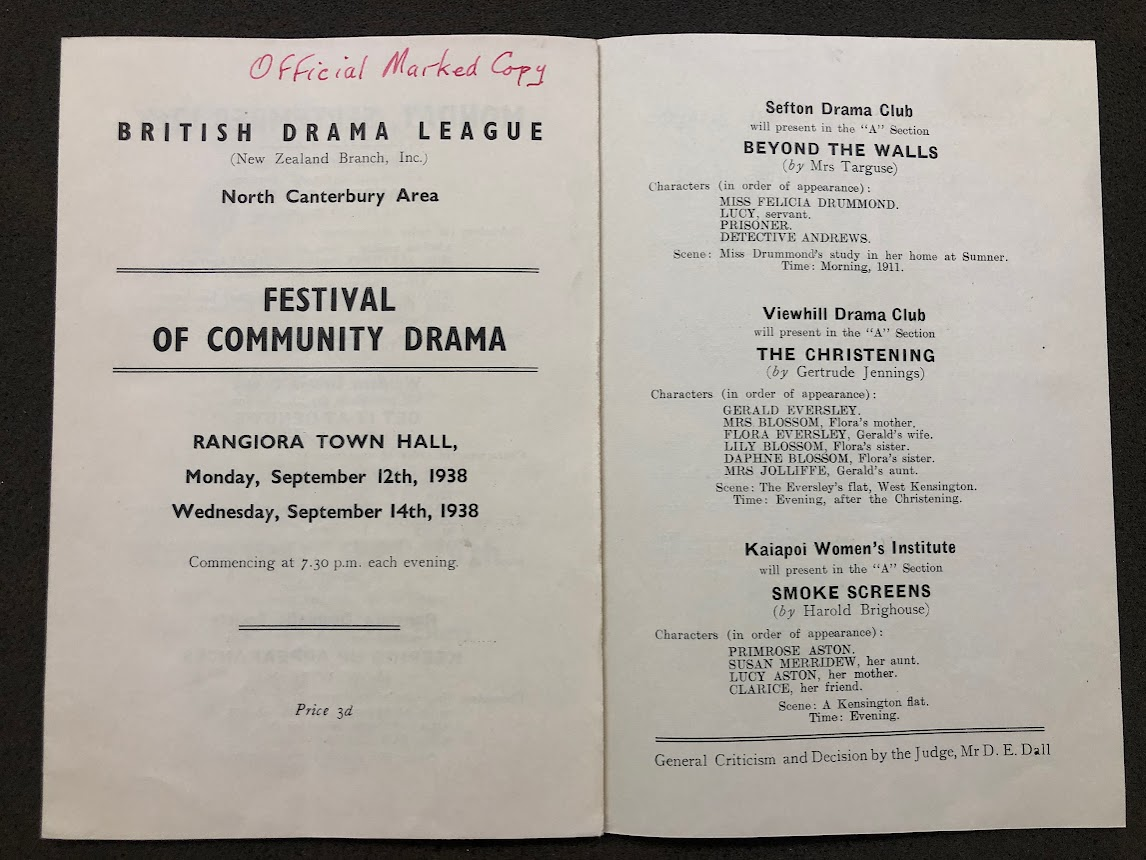
Program from the "Festival of Community Drama" run by the North Canterbury Area chapter of the British Drama League (New Zealand Branch) in Rangiora in September 1938, featuring plays by Violet Targuse, Gertrude Jennings, and Harold Brighouse

The British Drama League (New Zealand Branch) was established in 1932, as a New Zealand chapter of the British Drama League, a society that had been founded in England in 1919 to promote both amateur and professional theatre. It was founded by a small group of drama enthusiasts—predominately women, although with men offered the more senior positions.

Within a year of its creation, the League had established ten area headquarters around the country, each with between 7 and 36 amateur dramatic groups. The League offered summer schools on acting and producing, created a lending library for plays, and was to become the driving force of a large and active amateur dramatic movement throughout New Zealand.

One of the League’s first activities was to establish its own annual playwriting competition, in partnership with two magazines: the New Zealand Radio Record and the Tui’s Annual. In its inaugural competition in September 1932, two plays by Violet Targuse placed first equal, ahead of at least 68 other entries, winning the "Radio Record trophy" in the category for the best one-act play written by a New Zealand author whose work had not previously been published.

The League published several collections of New Zealand plays between 1933 and 1964.

An important activity for the local area branches of the League was to organise an annual festival of one-act plays in which local groups competed as teams.

In 1970, the League amalgamated with the New Zealand Drama Council (established in 1945), to form the New Zealand Theatre Federation, which was later re-branded as Theatre New Zealand.
