= Glen Evans =

New Zealand politician

Glen Evans QSO

16th Mayor of Lower Hutt
- In office 24 October 1986 – 31 October 1995
- Deputy: Teri Puketapu (1986-89); Betty van Gaalen (1989-95)
- Preceded by: John Kennedy-Good
- Succeeded by: John Terris

Personal details
- Born: Thomas Glendwr Gardner Evans; 22 April 1936 Bedford, Bedfordshire, England
- Died: 24 August 2016 (aged 80) Wellington, New Zealand
- Spouse: Barbara Cunningham (m. 1959)
- Children: 3
- Education: University of Otago; Victoria University College
- Occupation: Lawyer

Thomas Glendwr Gardner "Glen" Evans QSO (22 April 1936 – 24 August 2016) was a New Zealand politician. He served as the mayor of Lower Hutt from 1986 to 1995.

== Biography ==
=== Early life and family ===
Born in Bedford, Bedfordshire, England, on 22 April 1936, Evans was the son of New Zealand parents. In the wake of the Great Depression his father, an engineer, had gone to England to find work, and later served in the Colonial Service in Ceylon. Evans was educated at Palmerston North Boys' High School, and went on to study at the University of Otago and Victoria University College, graduating BA, LLB from the latter institution in 1962. In 1959 Evans married Barbara Cunningham, and the couple went on to have three sons. He was a member of the Jaycees and was a winner of the Jaycees national debating championship. From 1963 he was a lawyer in practice, first with the commercial law firm Chapman Tripp then as a partner with the firm Agar, Keesing and Evans. In 1979 he became a Wellington partner in the national firm of Buddle Findlay until he resigned in 1986.

=== Political career ===
At the 1971 local elections he stood as a candidate for the Lower Hutt City Council on mayor John Kennedy-Good's Combined Team ticket, but was unsuccessful. Evans was elected as a Lower Hutt City Councillor on a Citizens' ticket in 1974. Initially he was successful but his position was tenuous, finishing sixteenth for the sixteen positions available and only 28 votes ahead of the next candidate. However, following the counting of special votes, he was confirmed as elected increasing his 28 vote lead to 69. After one term on the council he did not stand for re-election in 1977. He also served on the Stokes Valley Licensing Trust and organised for the Stokes Valley swimming pool to be built.

In 1986 he returned to the political arena when he was selected as the Citizens' ticket nominee for the mayoralty to succeed Kennedy-Good who was retiring. This caused a split in the ticket with Gerald Bond, a councillor and chairman of the Hutt Valley Energy Board, forming a "combined progressive" electoral ticket after losing the nomination to Evans. Evans won the mayoralty at the 1986 election and his United Citizens ticket won in a landslide with majority of councillors. He defeated Labour councillor Alister Abernethy with Bond placing a distant third for mayor and lost his council and energy board seat. All of his ticket (which included several incumbents) were defeated. Evans was expecting a closer result and had thought Bond would be a close second. His legacy achievements from the beginning of his mayoralty included flood protection schemes along the Hutt River, the replacement of the Ewen Bridge and a new ring-road system.

During his second mayoral term he oversaw the amalgamation of Lower Hutt with several of the neighbouring authorities including the Petone Borough Council, Eastbourne Borough Council and Hutt County Council (centred on Wainuiomata) as well as land on the waterfront formerly in the possession of the Wellington Harbour Board. Post amalgamation the council began an urban renewal project in Petone with the revitalisation of Jackson Street. A council decision to build the Central City Plaza car-parking building in Queens Drive was the dominant issue of local politics in Hutt City in the early 1990s. Evans argued that the plaza would attract people to the south end of High Street and assist smaller retailers compete with Queensgate Mall. The cost of constructing the plaza sky-rocketed causing the council to find itself in severe financial strife, costing more than $35 million to design and build while only being valued at $13 million. It was the main issue at the 1992 election at which Evans was almost defeated by former councillor Lawrie Woodley and the Evans' United Citizens ticket lost their large majority of council seats. Evans had an election night lead of only 103 with over 500 special votes still to be counted, though ultimately the final count slightly extended Evans' majority to 128. Turnout for the 1992 election was a record low with barely one quarter of electors voting (the lowest anywhere in the country). Lower Hutt was the only place in New Zealand to still use polling booths rather than postal voting which Evans thought was a cause of comparatively low turnout. He reacted by having future elections switching to postal voting instead.

Financial issues continued mainly due to the escalating cost of the Queen's Drive car-parking plaza and by 1995 council debt was $102 million. Not all debt issues were due to Evans' decision making such as the $13 million Seaview Marina project which was committed to by the Wellington Harbour Board prior to the 1989 amalgamation. Evans kept rates down to only a 3.35% rise in 1994-5 (lower than the inflation rate) rather than the huge 16.2% rise which would have been required to repay the council budget deficit. Despite criticism he continued to invest in improving infrastructure despite existing debt such as a new sewage and trade waste treatment plant in Seaview (estimated to cost $100 million by its completion in 2001). Evans argued that the investments were necessary to sustain population in the area and that building them in advance would be cheaper in the long-term. After serving three terms as mayor, Evans did not seek re-election in 1995.

After retiring from the mayoralty he was elected a member of the Wellington Regional Council in 1995. He was a member for 12 years until 2007 when he retired. He was chairman of the transport committee from 2004 to 2007 where he focused on improving the rail network, which had been suffering from years of under-investment.

=== Later life and death ===
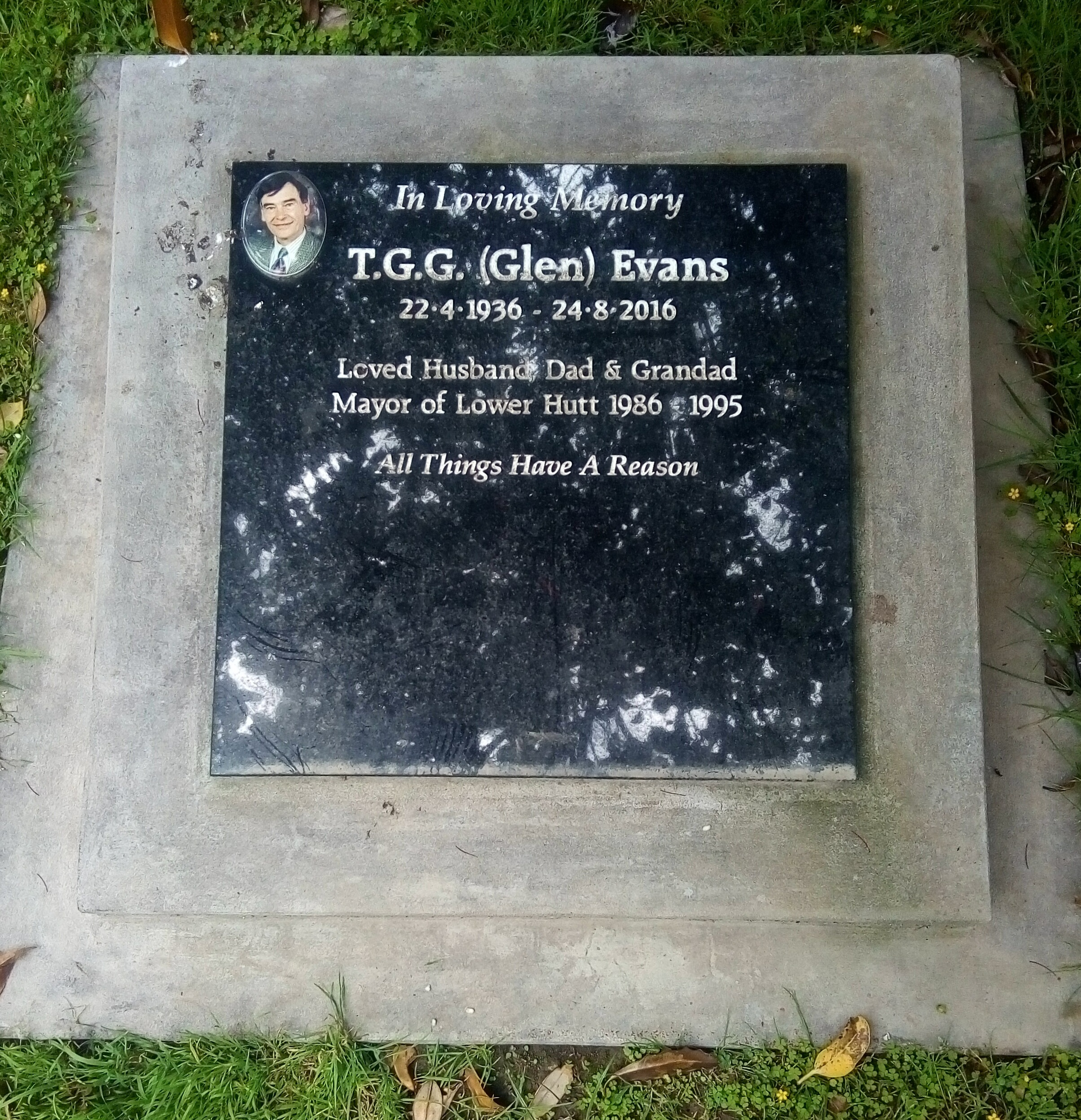
Evans' grave in Lower Hutt

In later life, Evans was afflicted by Alzheimer's disease. He died in Wellington on 24 August 2016.

== Honours ==
In 1990, Evans was awarded the New Zealand 1990 Commemoration Medal. In the 2004 Queen's Birthday Honours, he was appointed a Companion of the Queen's Service Order for public services.

== Notes ==
Political offices
Preceded by John Kennedy-Good	Mayor of Lower Hutt; 1986–1995	Succeeded by John Terris
