= Eastbourne, New Zealand =

Suburb of Lower Hutt, New Zealand

Eastbourne Ōkiwi (Māori)
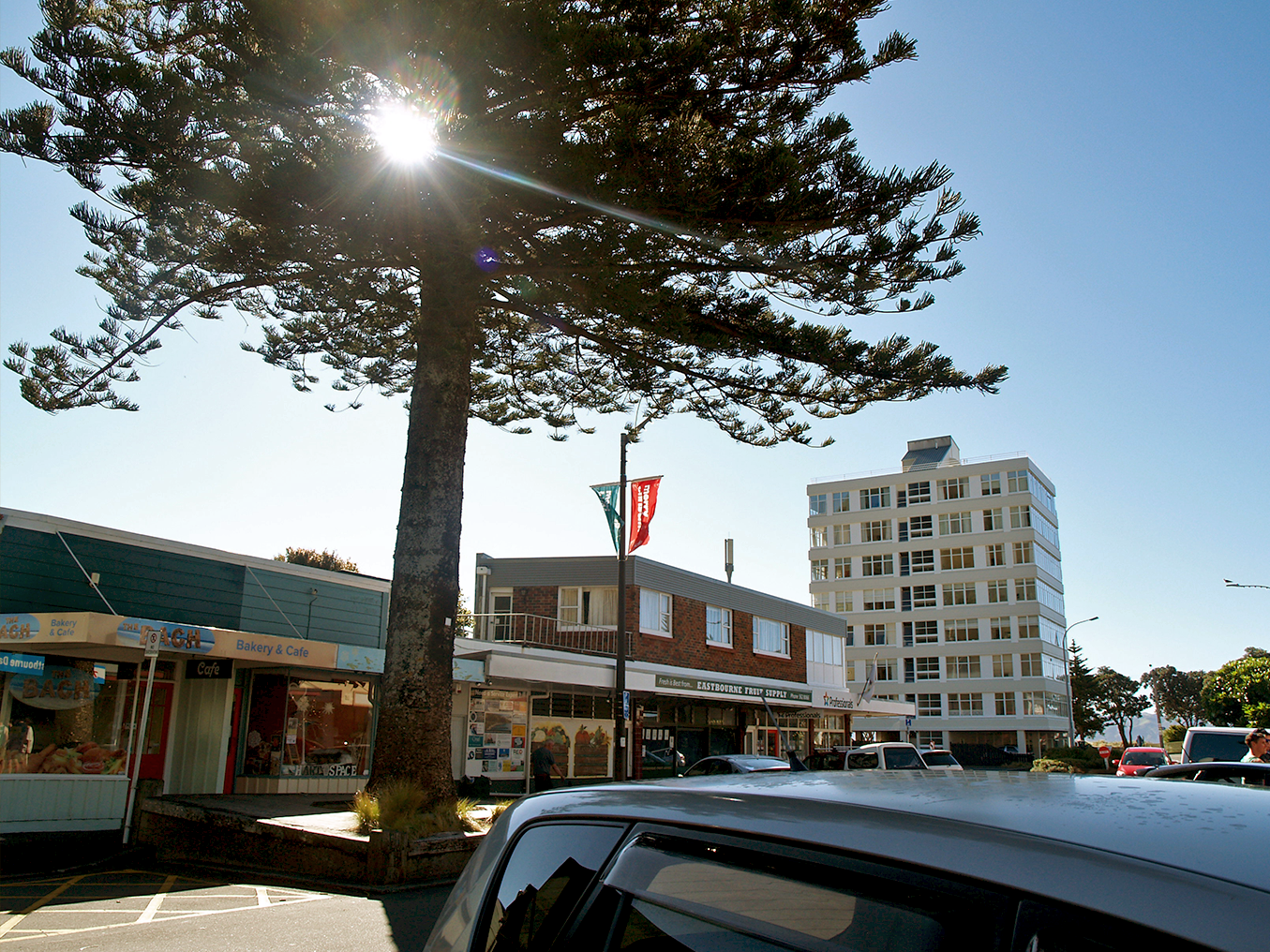
- Rimu Street, the main street of Eastbourne
- Interactive map of Eastbourne
- Coordinates: 41°18′S 174°54′E
- Country: New Zealand
- Region: Wellington Region
- Territorial authority: Lower Hutt
- Ward: Harbour
- Community board: Eastbourne Community Board
- Electorates: Hutt South; Ikaroa-Rāwhiti (Māori)

Government
  - Territorial Authority: Hutt City Council
  - Regional council: Greater Wellington Regional Council
  - Mayor of Lower Hutt: Ken Laban
  - Hutt South MP: TBD
  - Ikaroa-Rāwhiti MP: Cushla Tangaere-Manuel

Area
  - Total: 1.93 km^{2} (0.75 sq mi)

Population (June 2025)
  - Total: 2,760
  - Density: 1,430/km^{2} (3,700/sq mi)

Eastbourne (Māori: Ōkiwi) is a suburb of Lower Hutt, a part of Wellington, New Zealand. Lying beside the sea, it is a popular local tourist destination via car from Petone or from ferry crossings from central Wellington. An outer suburb, it lies on the eastern shore of Wellington Harbour, five kilometres south of the main Lower Hutt urban area and directly across the harbour from the Miramar Peninsula in Wellington city. A narrow exposed coastal road connects it with the rest of Lower Hutt via the Eastern Bays and the industrial suburb of Seaview. It is named for Eastbourne in England, another seaside town known as a destination for day-trips.

In the hills bordering Eastbourne there is mainly native bush and trees. With a locally administered possum-eradication programme, much of the native bush has regenerated, including red-flowering northern rātā trees. The bush has numerous tracks running to and from them, including a track along the entire bays hills ridge. With many settlers originating from Stromboli, an island near Sicily, the suburb has an Italian heritage similar to several other suburbs in Wellington; this is expressed particularly in its architecture.

== History ==
The suburb's origins lie in pre-colonial times, with local Māori Iwi having several Kāinga and Pā in the area for hundreds of years, in the bays and the raised headlands respectively. These settlements were located in the bays north of the suburb's centre, such as Point Howard and the Lowry, Rona and Days Bays. These settlements were essential, as they blocked out invasion from the neighbouring iwi in the Wairarapa, Ngāti Kahungunu. Raids were a common affair, and forced local Māori to always be vigilant.

European settlement increased after the devastating 1855 Wairarapa earthquake, because the Waiwhetu river in Seaview was lowered, along with the raising of the shore of Wellington Harbour by 2 metres. Eastbourne's Italian heritage began with the arrival of New Zealand's first Italian resident Salvatore Michele Savieri Cimino in 1841. He arrived onboard the Olympus. Following after Cimino was the settlement of Rona Bay (originally known as Brown's Bay) by Italians Bartolo and Italia Russo 1892. Renaming it after themselves as Russo Bay, the Russos, originally from Stromboli, they established a hotel and began horticultural and fishing industries. They prompted many relatives and friends to also emigrate, propelling Eastbourne into an elaborate little Italian New Zealand stronghold. Prior to its amalgamation into Lower Hutt, the Borough of Eastbourne comprised a separate town, with its own council and civic administration. The Eastbourne Community Board, a remnant of the former town council, remains vocal on local issues. A local bus station still bears the "Borough of Eastbourne" name.

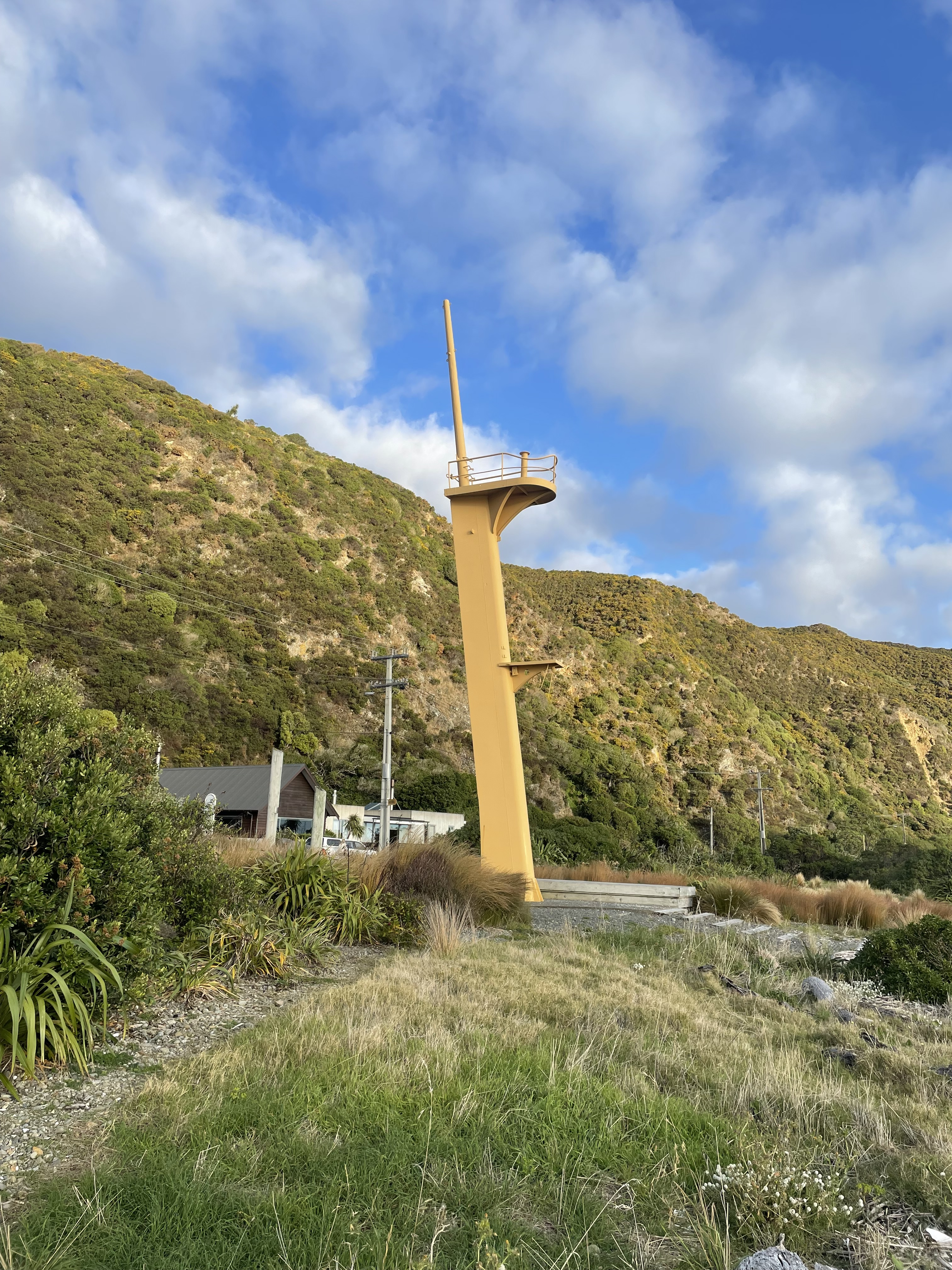
T.E.V. Wahine Foremast Memorial

The Wahine disaster was New Zealand's worst modern maritime disaster, occurring on 10 April 1968, when the ferry Wahine struck Barrett Reef in Wellington Harbour during a storm and capsized. 734 people were on board, and 53 died from drowning, injuries, or exposure to the elements. Eastbourne was cut off from the city by heavy seas which washed over Marine Drive. Passengers from the sinking vessel began to go towards Eastbourne and Seatoun. Residents took in survivors, Eastbourne's two hair-dressing salons emptied their establishments of towels and the local bakery delivered sandwiches, soup and trays piled with buns, scones, muffins, pies and cakes to the RSA. Installed in 2010, there now lies a memorial opposite the bus barn for those who died in the disaster.

== Demographics ==
Eastbourne statistical area covers 1.93 km^{2} (0.75 sq mi). It had an estimated population of 2,760 as of June 2025, with a population density of 1,430 people per km^{2}.

Historical population
Year	Pop.	±% p.a.
2006	2,700	—
2013	2,721	+0.11%
2018	2,709	−0.09%
2023	2,796	+0.63%

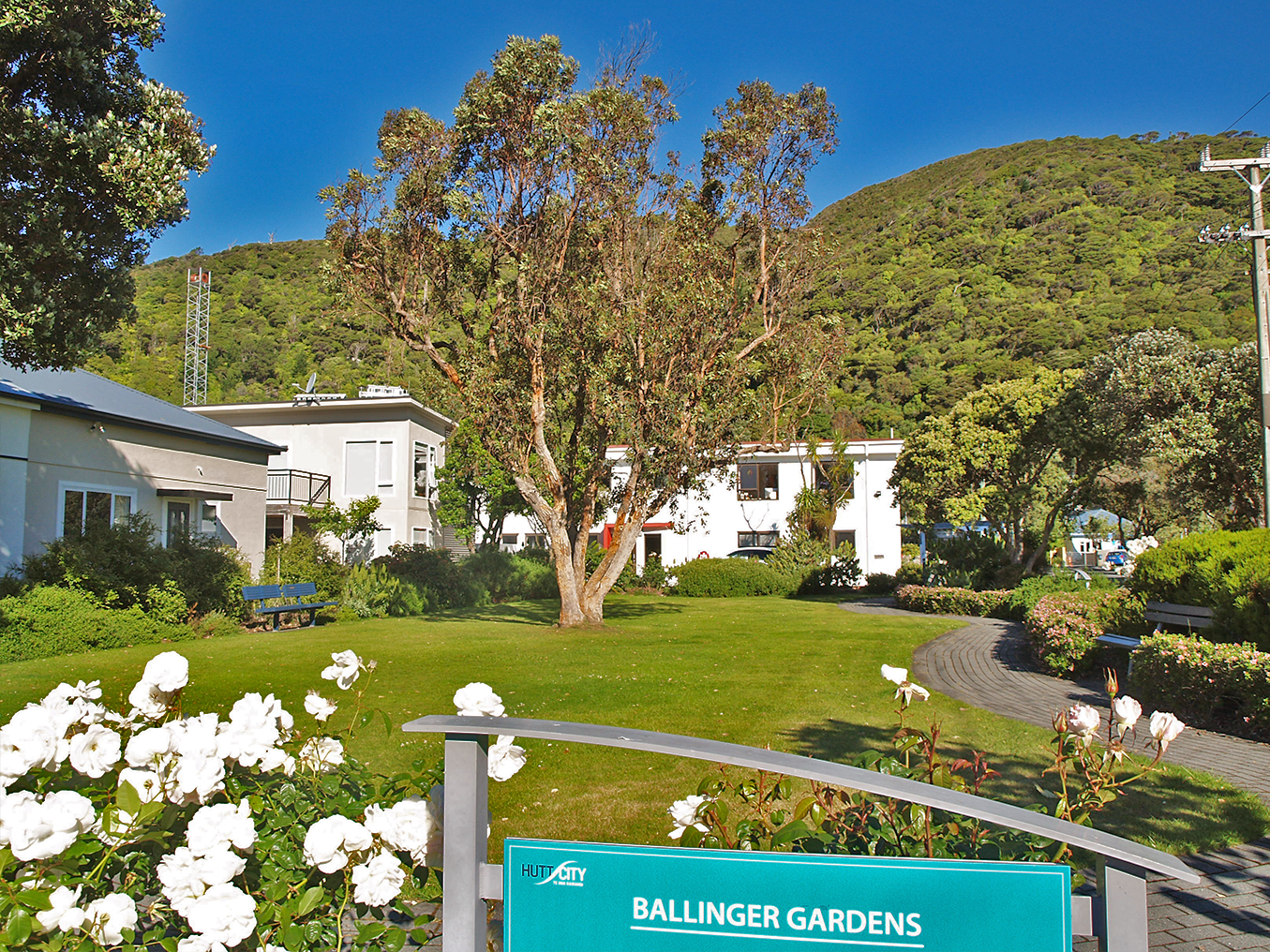
Ballinger Gardens, Eastbourne, demonstrating pleasant garden scenes and older architecture in the suburb.

Eastbourne had a population of 2,796 in the 2023 New Zealand census, an increase of 87 people (3.2%) since the 2018 census, and an increase of 75 people (2.8%) since the 2013 census. There were 1,368 males, 1,416 females, and 12 people of other genders in 1,128 dwellings. 3.3% of people identified as LGBTIQ+. The median age was 46.5 years (compared with 38.1 years nationally). There were 537 people (19.2%) aged under 15 years, 345 (12.3%) aged 15 to 29, 1,299 (46.5%) aged 30 to 64, and 615 (22.0%) aged 65 or older.

People could identify as more than one ethnicity. The results were 94.7% European (Pākehā); 6.5% Māori; 1.8% Pasifika; 3.9% Asian; 1.5% Middle Eastern, Latin American and African New Zealanders (MELAA); and 1.9% other, which includes people giving their ethnicity as "New Zealander". English was spoken by 98.4%, Māori by 1.1%, Samoan by 0.2%, and other languages by 11.1%. No language could be spoken by 1.4% (e.g. too young to talk). New Zealand Sign Language was known by 0.3%. The percentage of people born overseas was 27.1, compared with 28.8% nationally.

Religious affiliations were 32.3% Christian, 0.3% Hindu, 0.1% Māori religious beliefs, 0.4% Buddhist, 0.2% New Age, 0.3% Jewish, and 1.0% other religions. People who answered that they had no religion were 60.1%, and 5.0% of people did not answer the census question.

Of those at least 15 years old, 1,065 (47.1%) people had a bachelor's or higher degree, 951 (42.1%) had a post-high school certificate or diploma, and 243 (10.8%) people exclusively held high school qualifications. The median income was $57,900, compared with $41,500 nationally. 651 people (28.8%) earned over $100,000 compared to 12.1% nationally. The employment status of those at least 15 was 1,143 (50.6%) full-time, 408 (18.1%) part-time, and 42 (1.9%) unemployed.

== Culture and features today ==
Eastbourne constitutes Point Howard, Sorrento Bay, Whiorau/Lowry Bay, York Bay, Mahina Bay, Sunshine Bay, Days Bay, Rona Bay, Robinson bay, and Camp Bay.

Eastbourne's culture involves its laid-back, sunny atmosphere, small restaurants, heritage homes and remoteness that invokes a curiosity among other Wellingtonians, who have flocked there for summer day trips since the 19th century.

A regular trans-harbour ferry service connects Wellington's CBD and Eastbourne, docking at the Days Bay wharf in Eastbourne and at Queen's Wharf close to down-town Wellington. The ferry started in 1886, became daily in 1901, was bought by Eastbourne Borough Council in 1913 and stopped between 1948 and 1989. The ferry service is now owned and operated by East by West Ferries who added services between Eastbourne and Seatoun (which ceased in 2021 due to the Seaton Wharf undergoing substantial repairs to maintain safety and preserve its heritage. However, after its reopening in 2022, the company chose not to resume services) and services between Eastbourne and Mātiu / Somes Island.

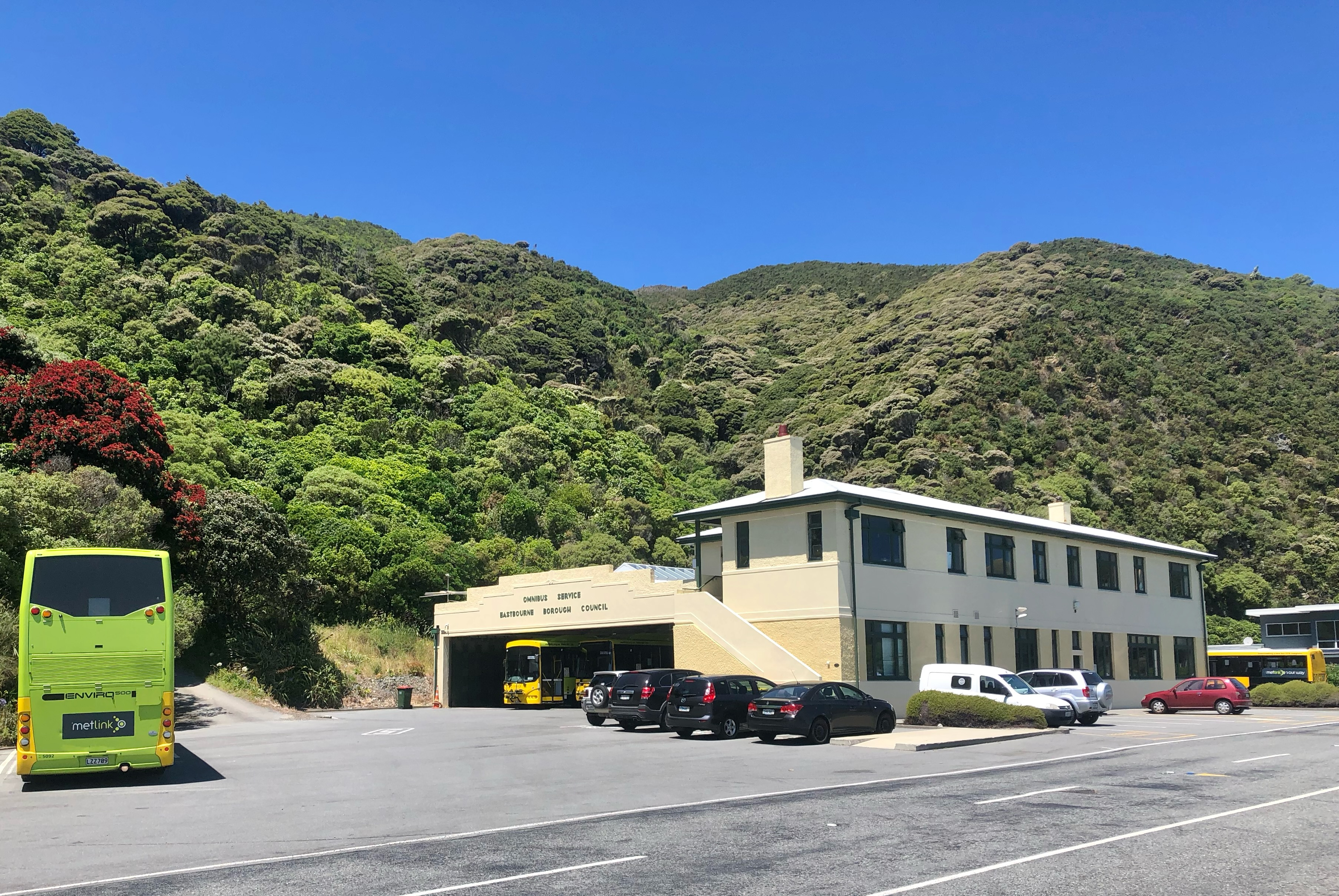
Eastbourne Borough Council Omnibus Service Garage 1939

The southern terminus of buses in Eastbourne is the Bus Barn, or Eastbourne Borough Council Omnibus Service Garage, which was formally opened on 24 May 1939. It has had a Historic Place Category 2 listing (Number 7644) since 8 February 2006. It was in the news in March 2022 when a double-deck bus tried to enter its low doorway.

Eastbourne has two currently operational local primary schools: Muritai School and (in Days Bay) Wellesley College.

At the end of Eastbourne beyond Burdan's gate there is a pedestrian-only coastal road (unsealed) which extends out to the Wellington Harbour entrance heads, where there are three lighthouses including both the upper and lower now decommissioned Pencarrow Head Lighthouse which were then replaced in 1935 by the Baring Head Lighthouse. This area, popular with cyclists, provides access to East Harbour Regional Park.

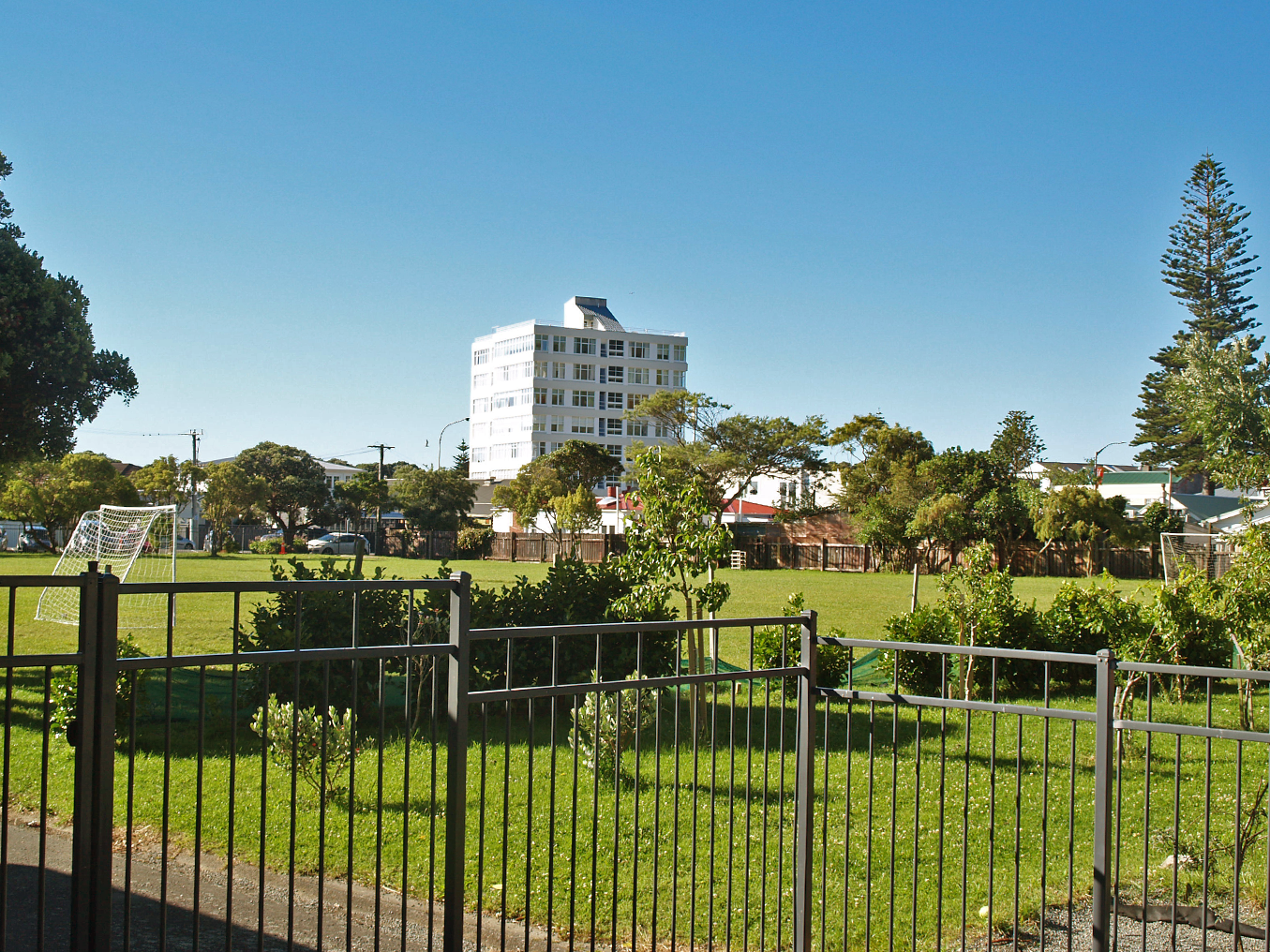
Muritai School Field, Eastbourne

The hills surrounding Eastbourne provide an important habitat for indigenous biodiversity and contain some of New Zealand's rarest and most-endangered plant species.

The banded dotterel (tūturiwhatu) is a nationally vulnerable bird that nests in the Eastbourne foreshore (Robinson Bay), Baring Head, and Parangarahu Lakes. Predator Free NZ has said that the banded dotterel is more endangered than the whio and great spotted kiwi. MIRO, Greater Wellington, Hutt City Council, and Taranaki Whānui ki Te Upoko o Te Ika have worked together since 2013 to manage the coastal-breeding populations of these birds.

The Eastbourne banded dotterel colony is located along the eastern shores of Wellington Harbour in Lower Hutt, and is the only breeding site for this species inside Wellington Harbour. In 2020, volunteers monitoring the site noted that a lone cat had eaten eggs and killed chicks, decimating seven nests in one season.

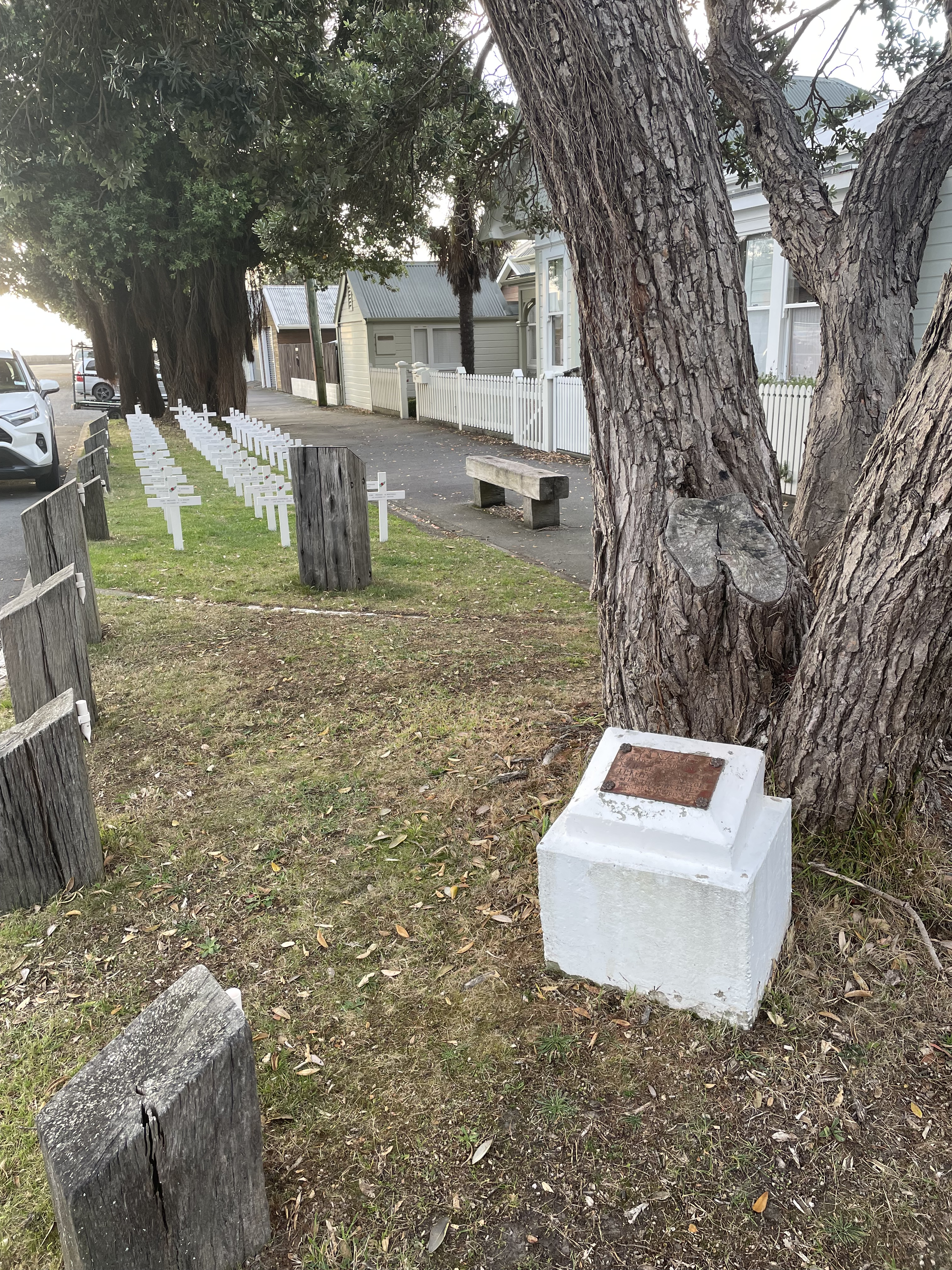
Eastbourne ANZAC memorial

Eastbourne has two ANZAC war memorials, one is located along the fencing of Muritai School installed in 1986, and the second is a Pōhutukawa (planted on 14 July 1915 by Eastbourne Mayor J P Kelly) together with its plaque forming the first ANZAC memorial erected in New Zealand.

The oldest church in Eastbourne is St Alban's Anglican Church, located at the end of Ngaio Street. Completed in 1910, the church building was designed by distinguished Wellington architect Frederick de Jersey Clere. The church along with its adjacent community hall have been closed since the 2016 Kaikōura earthquake, following assessments which deemed both buildings unsafe after they failed to meet the required earthquake building standards.

== Education ==
=== Current institutes ===
Muritai School is a co-educational state primary school for Year 1 to 8 students, with a roll of 332 as of July 2026. It opened in 1897.

Wellesley College is a boys-only independent primary school in Days Bay.

East Harbour Kindergarten is a community-based kindergarten for children between 2 and 5 years.

Barnardos Early Learning Centre Eastbourne for children between 0 and 6 years.

Days Bay Playcentre is a community-based playcentre for children ages 0–5 years.

Point Howard Playcentre is a community-based playcentre for children ages 0–5 years.

=== Past institutes ===
Gollans Valley School was a school located in Gollans Valley and closed in 1898.

Eastbourne nursery playcentre, around 1943.

San Antonio School was a co-educational state-integrated Catholic primary school for Year 1 to 8 students. Closed in 2022.

== Notable residents ==
- Ashley Bloomfield (1966–present), New Zealand public health official.
- Margaret Magill (1888–1962), teacher and school principal; served as deputy mayor of Eastbourne
- Mimie Wood (1888–1979), secretary, accountant and librarian for the Royal Society of New Zealand; lived in Eastbourne from 1920

== Past mayors ==
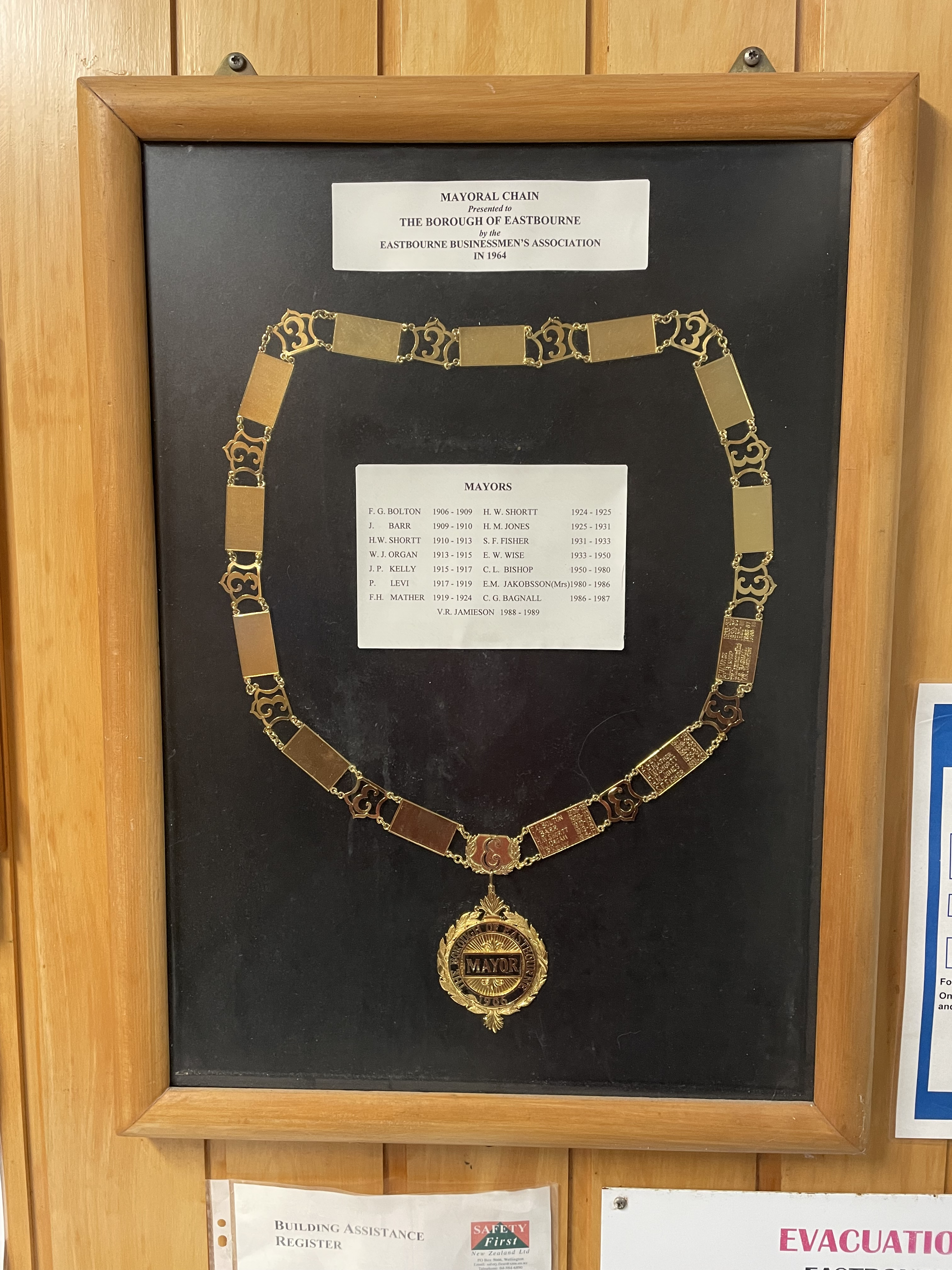
Mayoral Chain for the Borough of Eastbourne, found in the Eastbourne community library foyer

- Fred G Bolton, served 1906–1909
- John Barr, served 1909–1910
- Herbert William Shortt, served 1910–1913 (Born: 1877; Died: 1960)
- W J ORGAN, served 1913–1915
- J P Kelly, served 1915–1917 (Died: 1918)
- P Levi, served 1917–1919
- F H Mather, served 1919–1924
- Herbert William Shortt, served 1924–1925 (Born: 1877; Died: 1960)
- H M Jones, served 1925–1931
- S F Fisher, served 1931–1933
- Edward Wise, served 1933–1950
- Clifford Lyle Bishop, served 1950–1980 (Born: 1899; Died: 1993)
- Elaine Jakobsson (Mrs), served 1980–1986 (Born: 1929; Died: 1996)
- C G Bagnall, served 1986–1987
- V R Jamieson, served 1988–1989
