= Results of the 2025 New Zealand territorial authority elections in Manawatū-Whanganui =

2025 New Zealand territorial authority elections (Manawatū-Whanganui)
- 11 October 2025
- Turnout: 80,341 (46.28% ▲2.77 pp)
- 7 of 7 local councils
Party	Councils	+/–
No majority	7	0
This lists parties that won seats. See the complete results below.
- 7 mayors and 79 local councillors
Party	Seats	+/–
Mayors
Independent	7	0
Local councillors
Independent	72	−1
Green	3	+1
ACT Local	1	+1
Labour	1	0
Te Pāti Māori	1	0
Te Kōtui Reo	1	+1
This lists parties that won seats. See the complete results below.

Elections for the territorial authorities of New Zealand were held from 9 September until 11 October 2025 as part of that year's nation-wide local elections. 709 local councillors and 66 mayors were elected across 66 of 67 councils.

7 territorial authorities are located within the Manawatū-Whanganui Region. 7 mayors and 79 district and city councillors were elected. 5 of 7 mayors were re-elected and no group gained or held a majority on any council.

== Maps ==

Legend
Independent hold	Independent gain
Green hold	Green gain
	ACT Local gain
Labour hold	
	Te Pāti Māori gain
	Te Kōtui Reo gain

== Summary ==
=== Overall ===
Council	Electoral system	Seats	Mayor	Councillors	Control	Turnout	Details	Refs
Ruapehu	STV	9	▌ Independent hold	▌ Independent 9 ( 0)	▌ No majority	4,302; 51.56% ▲0.67 pp	Details	
Whanganui	FPP	12	▌ Independent hold	▌ Independent 12 ( 0)	▌ No majority	17,024; 50.81% ▲3.34 pp	Details	
Rangitīkei	FPP	11	▌ Independent hold	▌ Independent 11 ( 0)	▌ No majority	5,451; 49.85% ▲3.07 pp	Details	
Manawatū	FPP	11	▌ Independent gain	▌ Independent 8 (▼2) ▌ Independent Green 1 (▲1) ▌ ACT Local 1 (▲1) ▌ Te Kōtui Reo 1 (▲1)	▌ No majority	9,171; 40.29% ▼4.72 pp	Details	
Palmerston North	STV	15	▌ Independent hold	▌ Independent 11 (▲1) ▌ Green 2 ( 0) ▌ Labour 1 ( 0) ▌ Te Pāti Māori 1 (▲1)	▌ No majority	25,060; 42.13% ▲5.40 pp	Details	
Tararua	FPP	9	▌ Independent gain	▌ Independent 9 ( 0)	▌ No majority	7,119; 55.47% ▲6.25 pp	Details	
Horowhenua	FPP	12	▌ Independent hold	▌ Independent 12 ( 0)	▌ No majority	12,214; 47.44% ▲1.30 pp	Details	
7 of 7 councils		79						

=== Mayors ===
Territorial authority	Incumbent	Elected	Runner-up	Details	Refs
Ruapehu	Weston Kirton (Ind)		Grant Lethborg (Ind)	Details	
Whanganui	Andrew Tripe (Ind)		Josh Chandulal-Mackay (Ind)	Details	
Rangitīkei	Andy Watson (Ind)		Simon Loudon (Ind)	Details	
Manawatū	Helen Worboys^{R} (Ind)	Michael Ford (Ind)	unopposed	Details	
Palmerston North	Grant Smith (Ind)		Orphée Mickalad (Ind)	Details	
Tararua	Tracey Collis (Ind)	Scott Gilmore (Ind)	Tracey Collis (Ind)	Details	
Horowhenua	Bernie Wanden (Ind)		Justin Tamihana (Ind)	Details	
^{R} did not run for re-election

=== Candidates ===
Party / ticket	Mayors				Councillors			
Party / ticket	2022	Candidates	Elected	+/−	2022	Candidates	Elected	+/−
Independent	7	24	7	0	73	168	72	▼1
Green	no candidates				2	2	2	0
Independent Green	no candidates				0	2	1	▲1
ACT Local	no candidates				0	3	1	▲1
Te Kōtui Reo	no candidates				0	1	1	▲1
Labour	no candidates				1	2	1	0
Te Pāti Māori	no candidates				1	1	1	0
Animal Justice	no candidates				0	1	0	0
Rangitāne o Manawatū	no candidates				2	0	0	▼2
Seats:	7		7	0	79		79	0

== Ruapehu District Council ==
2025 Ruapehu District Council election
- 11 October 2025
- Turnout: 4,302 (51.56% ▲0.67 pp)
- Mayor
	Ind	Ind
Candidate	Weston Kirton	Grant Lethborg
Party	Independent	Independent
Primary vote	1,972	950
Percentage	45.84%	22.08%
Final vote	2,453	1,347
Percentage	64.55%	35.45%
	Ind	Ind
Candidate	Lyn Neeson	Fiona Hadley-Chase
Party	Independent	Independent
Primary vote	939	385
Percentage	21.90%	8.95%
Final vote	excluded	excluded
Mayor before election
Weston Kirton
Independent
Elected mayor
Weston Kirton
Independent
- Councillors
- 9 seats on the governing body of Stratford District Council; 5 seats needed for a majority
Party	Seats	+/–
Independent	9	0
This lists parties that won seats. See the complete results below.
Control before	Control after
No majority	No majority

=== 2025 Ruapehu mayoral election ===
2025 Ruapehu mayoral election
Party	Candidate	Primary votes	%	±%	Iteration	
Party	Candidate	Primary votes	%	±%	#	Votes
Independent	Weston Mervyn Kirton^{†}	1,972	45.84	+13.80	3rd	2,453
Independent	Grant Lethborg	950	22.08	(new)	3rd	1,347
Independent	Lyn Neeson	938	21.80	(new)	2nd	1,033
Independent	Fiona Kahukura Hadley-Chase	385	8.95	(new)	1st	385
Quota		2,123	49.35	+0.38		
Informal votes		9	0.21	+0.00		
Blank votes		48	1.12	+0.33		
Turnout		4,302	51.56	+0.67		
Registered electors		8,344				
Independent hold on 3rd iteration						
^{†} incumbent

=== Ruapehu general ward ===
2025 Ruapehu general ward election
Party	Candidate	Primary votes	%	±%	Iteration	
Party	Candidate	Primary votes	%	±%	#	Votes
Independent	Luke Pepper	817	23.70	(new)	1st	817
Independent	Rabbit Nottage^{†}	482	13.98	+0.89	1st	482
Independent	Robyn Gram^{†}	443	12.85	−3.64	2nd	506
Independent	Viv Hoeta^{†}	351	10.18	+2.27	10th	493
Independent	John Chapman	247	7.17	−0.17	21st	479
Independent	Brenda Ralph^{†}	167	4.84	−0.11	23rd	440
Independent	Peter Zimmer	147	4.26	−1.61	23rd	368
Independent	Rodger Baker	164	4.76	(new)	20th	287
Independent	Sophie Stockbridge	119	3.45	(new)	12th	215
Independent	Gary Griffin-Chappel	129	3.74	(new)	9th	161
Independent	Elise Te Hau Whakaheke Adams	116	3.37	(new)	7th	131
Independent	Nicoleen Wessels	73	2.12	(new)	5th	100
Independent	Rhonda Kingston	40	1.16	(new)	4th	49
Independent	Elaine Reed	19	0.55	(new)	3rd	22
Quota		473	13.72	+0.11		
Informal votes		40	1.16	+0.07		
Blank votes		93	2.70	−0.12		
Turnout		3,447	54.05	+0.76		
Registered electors		6,377				
Independent gain from Independent on 1st iteration						
Independent hold on 1st iteration						
Independent hold on 2nd iteration						
Independent hold on 10th iteration						
Independent gain from Independent on 21st iteration						
Independent hold on 23rd iteration						
^{†} incumbent

=== Ruapehu Māori ward ===
2025 Ruapehu Māori ward election
Party	Candidate	Primary votes	%	±%	Iteration	
Party	Candidate	Primary votes	%	±%	#	Votes
Independent	Kuru Ketu	263	30.76	(new)	1st	263
Independent	Channey Duncan Turoa Iwikau^{†}	143	16.73	−10.39	4th	205
Independent	Korty Wilson^{†}	161	18.83	−8.29	4th	203
Independent	Fiona Kahukura Hadley-Chase^{†}	122	14.27	−0.86	4th	158
Independent	Simon Hepi	96	11.23	(new)	3rd	107
Independent	Marilyn Ngawini Davis	42	4.91	(new)	2nd	44
Quota		207	24.21	+0.97		
Informal votes		12	1.40	+0.31		
Blank votes		16	1.87	−1.76		
Turnout		855	43.47	+0.67		
Registered electors		1,967				
Independent gain from Independent on 1st iteration						
Independent hold on 4th iteration						
Independent hold on 4th iteration						
^{†} incumbent

=== Referendum on Māori wards ===
Choice	Votes	%
I vote to KEEP Māori wards	2,098	51.42
I vote to REMOVE Māori wards	1,982	48.58
Total	4,080	100.00
Valid votes	4,080	94.84
Invalid votes	2	0.05
Blank votes	220	5.11
Total votes	4,302	100.00
Registered voters/turnout	8,344	51.56
Source: electionz.com & MCERT

== Whanganui District Council ==
2025 Whanganui District Council election
- 11 October 2025
- Turnout: 17,024 (50.81% ▲3.34 pp)
- Mayor
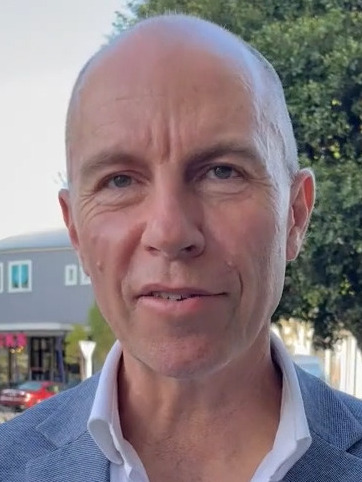
		Ind	Ind
Candidate	Andrew Tripe	Josh Chandulal-Mackay	Peter Oskam
Party	Independent	Independent	Independent
Popular vote	9,147	5,286	1,895
Percentage	53.73%	31.05%	11.13%
Mayor before election
Andrew Tripe
Independent
Elected mayor
Andrew Tripe
Independent
- Councillors
- 12 seats on the governing body of Whanganui District Council; 7 seats needed for a majority
Party	Seats	+/–
Independent	12	0
This lists parties that won seats. See the complete results below.
Control before	Control after
No majority	No majority

=== 2025 Whanganui mayoral election ===
2025 Whanganui mayoral election
Party	Candidate	Votes	%	±%
Independent	Andrew Tripe^{†}	9,147	53.73	+0.36
Independent	Josh Chandulal-Mackay	5,286	31.05	(new)
Independent	Peter Oskam	1,895	11.13	(new)
Independent	Gregory McPhee	295	1.73	(new)
Informal votes		24	0.14	+0.05
Blank votes		377	2.21	+0.12
Turnout		17,024	50.81	+3.34
Registered electors		33,505		
Independent hold				
^{†} incumbent

=== Whanganui general ward ===
2025 Whanganui general ward election
Party	Candidate	Votes	%	±%
Independent	Michael Law^{†}	8,990	60.20	+13.48
Independent	Josh Chandulal-Mackay^{†}	8,712	58.34	+4.94
Independent	Kate Joblin^{†}	8,617	57.70	+2.49
Independent	Rob Vinsen^{†}	8,226	55.08	+1.63
Independent	Charlotte Melser^{†}	7,773	52.05	+7.12
Independent	Glenda Brown^{†}	7,134	47.77	+3.62
Independent	Philippa Baker-Hogan^{†}	6,836	45.77	+4.68
Independent	Mike Hos	6,802	45.55	(new)
Independent	Peter Oskam^{†}	6,032	40.39	−0.32
Independent	Ross Fallen^{†}	5,868	39.29	+3.45
Independent	Rob Oscroft	5,304	35.52	(new)
Independent	Jay Rerekura	5,168	34.61	(new)
Independent	Tracey Jarman	3,896	26.09	(new)
Independent	Jason Bardell	3,853	25.80	(new)
Independent	Scott Phillips	3,767	25.22	+8.07
Independent	Tony Sundman	3,227	21.61	(new)
Independent Green	Awhi Haenga	3,053	20.44	(new)
Independent	Azian Z	2,662	17.83	(new)
Independent	Julian Emmett	2,272	15.21	(new)
Independent	Michael Organ	1,915	12.82	(new)
Independent	Robin Westley	1,828	12.24	(new)
Animal Justice	Sandra Isobel Kyle	1,823	12.21	(new)
Independent	Gregory McPhee	1,460	9.78	(new)
Informal votes		46	0.31	+1.02
Blank votes		107	0.72	+2.33
Turnout		14,934	52.04	+4.57
Registered electors		28,695		
Independent hold				
Independent hold				
Independent hold				
Independent hold				
Independent hold				
Independent hold				
Independent hold				
Independent gain from Independent				
Independent hold				
Independent hold				
^{†} incumbent

=== Whanganui Māori ward ===
2025 Whanganui Māori ward election
Party	Candidate	Votes	%	±%
Independent	Julie Herewini	1,122	53.68	n/a
Independent	Geoff Hipango	922	44.11	n/a
Independent	Kiritahi Firmin	638	30.53	n/a
Independent	Hayden Potaka	538	25.74	n/a
Independent	Phil T Reweti (Bear)	403	19.28	n/a
Informal votes		0	0.00	n/a
Blank votes		21	1.00	n/a
Turnout		2,090	43.45	n/a
Registered electors		4,810		
Independent win (new seat)				
Independent win (new seat)				

=== Referendum on Māori wards ===
Choice	Votes	%
I vote to KEEP Māori wards	8,292	52.63
I vote to REMOVE Māori wards	7,462	47.37
Total	15,754	100.00
Valid votes	15,754	92.54
Invalid votes	2	0.01
Blank votes	1,268	7.45
Total votes	17,024	100.00
Registered voters/turnout	33,505	50.81
Source: electionz.com & MCERT

== Rangitīkei District Council ==
2025 Rangitīkei District Council election
- 11 October 2025
- Turnout: 5,451 (49.85% ▲3.07 pp)
- Mayor
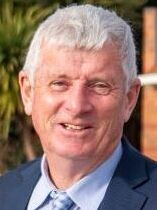
		Ind
Candidate	Andy Watson	Simon Loudon
Party	Independent	Independent
Popular vote	2,449	1,730
Percentage	44.93%	31.74%
	Ind	Ind
Candidate	John Hainsworth	David Christison
Party	Independent	Independent
Popular vote	663	515
Percentage	12.16%	9.45%
Mayor before election
Andy Watson
Independent
Elected mayor
Andy Watson
Independent
- Councillors
- 11 seats on the governing body of Rangitīkei District Council; 6 seats needed for a majority
Party	Seats	+/–
Independent	11	0
This lists parties that won seats. See the complete results below.
Control before	Control after
No majority	No majority

=== 2025 Rangitīkei mayoral election ===
2025 Rangitīkei mayoral election
Party	Candidate	Votes	%	±%
Independent	Andy Watson^{†}	2,449	44.93	−5.68
Independent	Simon Loudon	1,730	31.74	−0.36
Independent	John Hainsworth	663	12.16	(new)
Independent	David Christison	515	9.45	−3.47
Informal votes		3	0.06	−0.08
Blank votes		91	1.67	−0.14
Turnout		5,451	49.85	+3.07
Registered electors		10,935		
Independent hold				
^{†} incumbent

=== Northern general ward ===
2025 Northern general ward election
Party	Candidate	Votes	%	±%
Independent	Jeff Wong^{†}	904	90.40	+7.71
Independent	Diana Baird	432	43.20	(new)
Independent	Peter Kipling-Arthur	397	39.70	(new)
Informal votes		0	0.00	−0.56
Blank votes		16	1.60	+1.04
Turnout		1,000	52.16	−0.27
Registered electors		1,917		
Independent hold				
Independent gain from Independent				
^{†} incumbent

=== Central general ward ===
2025 Central general ward election
Party	Candidate	Votes	%	±%
Independent	Fi Dalgety^{†}	1,866	68.30	+3.95
Independent	Dave Wilson^{†}	1,830	66.98	+2.12
Independent	John Hainsworth	1,532	56.08	(new)
Independent	Alan Buckendahl	1,526	55.86	(new)
Independent	Sandra Field	1,197	43.81	(new)
Independent	David Christison	896	32.80	(new)
Independent	Bryan Hastings	748	27.38	(new)
Independent	Justin Adams	632	23.13	(new)
Informal votes		7	0.26	+0.22
Blank votes		20	0.73	−1.61
Turnout		2,732	54.10	+0.49
Registered electors		5,050		
Independent hold				
Independent hold				
Independent gain from Independent				
Independent gain from Independent				
Independent gain from Independent				
^{†} incumbent

=== Southern general ward ===
2025 Southern general ward election
Party	Candidate	Votes	%	±%
Independent	Paul Sharland	600	62.57	(new)
Independent	Graeme O'Fee	494	51.51	(new)
Independent	Graham Jenkins	250	26.07	(new)
Independent	Bryan Rowe	233	24.30	(new)
Informal votes		0	0.00	n/a
Blank votes		29	3.02	n/a
Turnout		959	41.88	n/a
Registered electors		2,290		
Independent gain from Independent				
Independent gain from Independent				

=== Tiikeitia ki Uta (Inland) Māori ward ===
2025 Tiikeitia ki Uta (Inland) Māori ward election
Party	Candidate	Votes	%	±%
Independent	Piki Te Ora (Tracey) Hiroa^{†}	elected unopposed		
Registered electors		933		
Independent hold				
^{†} incumbent

=== Tiikeitia ki Tai (Coastal) Māori ward ===
2025 Tiikeitia ki Tai (Coastal) Māori ward election
Party	Candidate	Votes	%	±%
Independent	Coral Raukawa^{†}	283	87.35	n/a
Independent	David Yates	30	9.26	(new)
Informal votes		3	0.93	n/a
Blank votes		11	3.40	n/a
Turnout		324	43.49	n/a
Registered electors		745		
Independent hold				
^{†} incumbent

=== Referendum on Māori wards ===
Choice	Votes	%
I vote to REMOVE Māori wards	2,651	51.31
I vote to KEEP Māori wards	2,516	48.69
Total	5,167	100.00
Valid votes	5,167	94.79
Invalid votes	1	0.02
Blank votes	283	5.19
Total votes	5,451	100.00
Registered voters/turnout	10,935	49.85
Source: electionz.com & MCERT

== Manawatū District Council ==
2025 Manawatū District Council election
- 11 October 2025
- Turnout: 9,171 (40.29% ▼4.72 pp)
- Mayor
	Ind
Candidate	Michael Ford
Party	Independent
Popular vote	Unopposed
Mayor before election
Helen Worboys
Independent
Elected mayor
Michael Ford
Independent
- Councillors
- 11 seats on the governing body of Manawatū District Council; 6 seats needed for a majority
Party	Seats	+/–
Independent	8	−2
Independent Green	1	+1
ACT Local	1	+1
Te Kōtui Reo	1	+1
This lists parties that won seats. See the complete results below.
Control before	Control after
No majority	No majority

=== 2025 Manawatū mayoral election ===
2025 Manawatū mayoral election
Party	Candidate	Votes	%	±%
Independent	Michael Ford	elected unopposed		
Registered electors		22,762		
Independent gain from Independent				

=== Manawatū Rural general ward ===
2025 Manawatū Rural general ward election
Party	Candidate	Votes	%	±%
Independent	Shelley Dew-Hopkins	2,829	63.20	(new)
Independent	Alison Short^{†}	2,763	61.73	+2.91
Independent	Andrew Quarrie^{†}	2,724	60.86	−3.00
Independent	James McKelvie	2,477	55.34	(new)
Independent	Rob Duindam	2,085	46.58	(new)
Independent	Colin McFadzean^{†}	1,765	39.43	−19.00
Independent	Kirk Trownson	1,491	33.31	(new)
Informal votes		4	0.09	+0.02
Blank votes		97	2.17	−0.41
Turnout		4,476	43.40	−0.43
Registered electors		10,313		
Independent gain from Independent				
Independent hold				
Independent hold				
Independent gain from Independent				
Independent gain from Independent				
^{†} incumbent

=== Fielding general ward ===
2025 Feilding general ward election
Party	Candidate	Votes	%	±%
Independent	Raewyn Loader	2,753	58.64	(new)
Independent	Grant Hadfield^{†}	2,490	53.04	−9.16
Independent	Colin Dyer	2,371	50.50	(new)
Independent Green	Sam Hill	2,241	47.73	(new)
ACT Local	Jerry Pickford	2,012	42.85	(new)
ACT Local	Aaron McLeod	1,911	40.70	(new)
Independent	Daniel Cox	1,644	35.02	(new)
Independent	Clive Raharuhi	1,383	29.46	(new)
Independent	Tony Wright	1,055	22.47	(new)
Independent	Alistair Graeme Hicks	1,036	22.07	(new)
Informal votes		8	0.17	+0.11
Blank votes		52	1.11	−1.41
Turnout		4,695	43.74	−4.35
Registered electors		10,735		
Independent gain from Independent				
Independent hold				
Independent gain from Independent				
Independent Green gain from Independent				
ACT Local gain from Independent				
^{†} incumbent

=== Ngā Tapuae o Mātangi Māori ward ===
2025 Ngā Tapuae o Mātangi Māori ward election
Party	Candidate	Votes	%	±%
Te Kōtui Reo	Bridget Bell^{†}	elected unopposed		
Registered electors		1,714		
Te Kōtui Reo gain from Te Pāti Māori				
^{†} incumbent

=== Referendum on Māori wards ===
Choice	Votes	%
I vote to REMOVE Māori wards	5,380	56.67
I vote to KEEP Māori wards	4,114	43.33
Total	9,494	100.00
Valid votes	9,494	96.03
Invalid votes	2	0.02
Blank votes	391	3.95
Total votes	9,887	100.00
Registered voters/turnout	22,762	43.44
Source: electionz.com & MCERT

== Palmerston North City Council ==
2025 Palmerston North City Council election
- 11 October 2025
- Turnout: 25,060 (42.13% ▲5.40 pp)
- Mayor
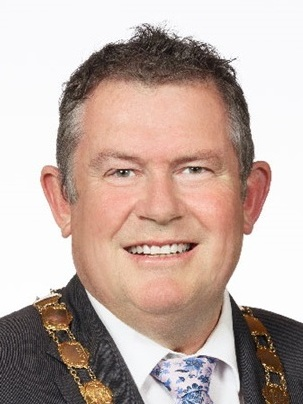

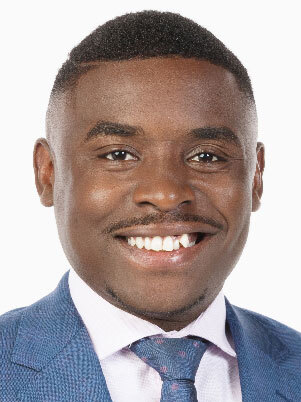
			Ind
Candidate	Grant Smith	Orphée Mickalad	Caleb Riddick
Party	Independent	Independent	Independent
Primary vote	15,124	5,310	2,427
Percentage	60.35%	21.190%	9.68%
Mayor before election
Grant Smith
Independent
Elected mayor
Grant Smith
Independent
- Councillors
- 15 seats on the governing body of Palmerston North City Council; 8 seats needed for a majority
Party	Seats	+/–
Independent	11	+1
Green	2	0
Labour	1	0
Te Pāti Māori	1	+1
This lists parties that won seats. See the complete results below.
Control before	Control after
No majority	No majority

=== 2025 Palmerston North mayoral election ===
2025 Palmerston North mayoral election
Party	Candidate	Primary votes	%	±%	Iteration	
Party	Candidate	Primary votes	%	±%	#	Votes
Independent	Grant Smith^{†}	15,124	60.35	−15.67	1st	15,124
Independent	Orphée Mickalad	5,310	21.19	(new)	1st	5,310
Independent	Caleb Riddick	2,427	9.68	(new)	1st	2,427
Independent	Michael Morris	1,121	4.47	(new)	1st	1,121
Quota		11,991	47.85	−0.25		
Informal votes		101	0.40	+0.11		
Blank votes		977	3.90	+0.35		
Turnout		25,060	42.13	+5.40		
Registered electors		59,478				
Independent hold on 1st iteration						
^{†} incumbent

=== Te Hirawanui general ward ===
2025 Te Hirawanui general ward election
Party	Candidate	Primary votes	%	±%	Iteration	
Party	Candidate	Primary votes	%	±%	#	Votes
Independent	William George Wood^{†}	3,281	14.17	+4.81	1st	3,281
Independent	Mark Arnott^{†}	1,481	6.40	n/a	2nd	1,757
Independent	Orphée Mickalad^{†}	1,583	6.84	n/a	2nd	1,716
Independent	Karen Naylor^{†}	1,136	4.91	n/a	41st	1,613
Independent	Rachel Bowen^{†}	1,169	5.05	−2.36	44th	1,583
Independent	Lew Findlay^{†}	1,187	5.13	n/a	48th	1,605
Independent	Vaughan Dennison^{†}	1,023	4.42	n/a	50th	1,572
Green	Brent Barrett^{†}	1,196	5.16	−2.01	50th	1,563
Independent	Hayden Fitzgerald	645	2.79	(new)	64th	1,800
Labour	Lorna Johnson^{†}	1,096	4.73	n/a	65th	1,528
Independent	Billy Meehan^{†}	604	2.61	n/a	66th	1,571
Independent	Leonie Hapeta^{†}	578	2.50	n/a	67th	1,518
Green	Kaydee Jean Zabelin^{†}	895	3.86	n/a	80th	1,492
Labour	Zulfiqar Butt	837	3.61	n/a	80th	1,434
ACT Local	Glen Williams	696	3.01	(new)	63th	1,201
Independent	Jackie Wheeler	631	2.72	(new)	56th	1,051
Independent	Mark Gunning	525	2.27	(new)	47th	795
Independent	Caleb Riddick	512	2.21	(new)	45th	732
Independent	Jeremy Craig Hoskins	475	2.05	(new)	42nd	584
Independent	Verne Wilson	397	1.71	(new)	40th	530
Independent	Nelson Harper	315	1.36	(new)	38th	438
Independent	Wajeha Akbaryan	328	1.42	(new)	36th	422
Independent	Richard Woolgar	226	0.98	(new)	31st	297
Independent	Eldhose Poovathumveettil Mathew	201	0.87	(new)	30th	235
Independent	Melanie Butler	150	0.65	n/a	29th	228
Independent	Kayne John Dunlop	183	0.79	(new)	26th	219
Independent	Dave Salisbury	149	0.64	(new)	22nd	204
Independent	Tobias Wilson Nash	132	0.57	(new)	20th	175
Independent	Cameron Jenkins	130	0.56	(new)	19th	141
Independent	Dave Poppelwell	110	0.47	(new)	18th	134
Independent	Quintin McGregor	115	0.50	(new)	16th	131
Independent	Adrian Phillips	113	0.49	(new)	13th	121
Independent	Eric Judd	90	0.39	(new)	11th	99
Independent	Atif Rahim	93	0.40	n/a	10th	97
Independent	Michael Paul Strachan	90	0.39	(new)	7th	95
Independent	Jack Koh	78	0.34	(new)	4th	84
Independent	Zakk Rokkanno	9	0.04	n/a	3rd	11
Quota		1,604	6.93	+0.00		
Informal votes		477	2.06	−4.37		
Blank votes		222	0.96	+0.44		
Turnout		23,158	42.70	+4.10		
Registered electors		54,228				
Independent hold on 1st iteration						
Independent hold on 2nd iteration						
Independent hold on 2nd iteration						
Independent hold on 41st iteration						
Independent hold on 44th iteration						
Independent hold on 48th iteration						
Independent hold on 50th iteration						
Green hold on 50th iteration						
Independent gain from Independent on 64th iteration						
Labour hold on 65th iteration						
Independent hold on 66th iteration						
Independent hold on 67th iteration						
Green hold on 80th iteration						
^{†} incumbent

=== Te Pūao Māori ward ===
2025 Te Pūao Māori ward election
Party	Candidate	Primary votes	%	±%	Iteration	
Party	Candidate	Primary votes	%	±%	#	Votes
Te Pāti Māori	Debi Marshall-Lobb^{†}	1,087	57.15	n/a	1st	1,087
Independent	Bonnie Kuru	547	28.76	(new)	2nd	803
Independent	Rowland Prince Fitzgerald^{†}	209	10.99	n/a	2nd	358
Quota		614	32.28	n/a		
Informal votes		27	1.42	n/a		
Blank votes		32	1.68	n/a		
Turnout		1,902	36.23	n/a		
Registered electors		5,250				
Te Pāti Māori gain from Rangitāne o Manawatū on 1st iteration						
Independent gain from Rangitāne o Manawatū on 2nd iteration						
^{†} incumbent

=== Referendum on Māori wards ===
Choice	Votes	%
I vote to KEEP Māori wards	13,373	55.51
I vote to REMOVE Māori wards	10,718	44.49
Total	24,091	100.00
Valid votes	24,091	96.13
Invalid votes	13	0.05
Blank votes	956	3.81
Total votes	25,060	100.00
Registered voters/turnout	59,478	42.13
Source: PNCC & MCERT

== Tararua District Council ==
2025 Tararua District Council election
- 11 October 2025
- Turnout: 7,119 (55.47% ▲6.25 pp)
- Mayor
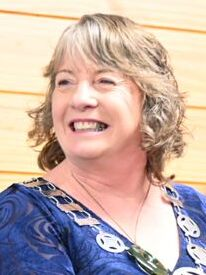
	Ind
Candidate	Scott Gilmore	Tracey Collis
Party	Independent	Independent
Popular vote	2,900	2,413
Percentage	40.74%	33.90%
	Ind	Ind
Candidate	Steve Wallace	Michael Spence
Party	Independent	Independent
Popular vote	1,008	416
Percentage	14.16%	5.84%
Mayor before election
Tracey Collis
Independent
Elected mayor
Scott Gilmore
Independent
- Councillors
- 9 seats on the governing body of Tararua District Council; 5 seats needed for a majority
Party	Seats	+/–
Independent	9	0
This lists parties that won seats. See the complete results below.
Control before	Control after
No majority	No majority

=== 2025 Tararua mayoral election ===
2025 Tararua mayoral election
Party	Candidate	Votes	%	±%
Independent	Scott Gilmore	2,900	40.74	(new)
Independent	Tracey Collis^{†}	2,413	33.90	−23.69
Independent	Steve Wallace	1,008	14.16	(new)
Independent	Michael Spence	416	5.84	(new)
Independent	Evan Matthew Nattrass	304	4.27	(new)
Informal votes		7	0.10	+0.07
Blank votes		70	0.98	−0.36
Turnout		7,119	55.47	+6.25
Registered electors		12,835		
Independent gain from Independent				
^{†} incumbent

=== North Tararua general ward ===
2025 North Tararua general ward election
Party	Candidate	Votes	%	±%
Independent	Steve Wallace^{†}	1,911	51.43	−8.85
Independent	Erana Peeti-Webber^{†}	1,796	48.33	−5.88
Independent	Sharon Wards^{†}	1,586	42.68	+1.44
Independent	Alison Amboy	1,520	40.90	(new)
Independent	James Walker	1,434	38.59	+3.76
Independent	Ron Wallace	1,390	37.41	(new)
Independent	Thomas Scott	859	23.12	(new)
Independent	Trev Moore	766	20.61	(new)
Independent	Michael Spence	702	18.89	(new)
Independent	Susan Lyford	662	17.81	(new)
Independent	Dot Watson	321	8.64	(new)
Informal votes		3	0.08	−0.09
Blank votes		23	0.62	−0.37
Turnout		3,716	61.38	+3.71
Registered electors		6,054		
Independent hold				
Independent hold				
Independent hold				
Independent gain from Independent				
^{†} incumbent

=== South Tararua general ward ===
2025 South Tararua general ward election
Party	Candidate	Votes	%	±%
Independent	Scott Gilmore^{†} (withdrawn, elected mayor)	1,985	71.61	+11.77
Independent	Elisabeth Kennedy	1,032	37.23	(new)
Independent	Peter Johns^{†}	986	35.57	−32.10
Independent	Peter Naylor	902	32.54	(new)
Independent	Chris Corlett	742	26.77	(new)
Independent	Evan Matthew Nattrass	656	23.67	(new)
Independent	Hamish Blyth	638	23.02	(new)
Independent	Mike Long^{†}	609	21.97	−37.49
Independent	Ernie Christison	570	20.56	(new)
Independent	Mark Watson	533	19.23	(new)
Independent	Ethan Hindry	463	16.70	(new)
Informal votes		5	0.18	+0.14
Blank votes		66	2.38	−1.22
Turnout		2,772	51.50	+8.05
Registered electors		5,383		
Independent gain from Independent				
Independent hold				
Independent gain from Independent				
Independent gain from Independent				
^{†} incumbent

=== Tamaki nui-a-Rua Māori ward ===
2025 Tamaki nui-a-Rua Māori ward election
Party	Candidate	Votes	%	±%
Independent	Keshaan Te Waaka	335	53.09	(new)
Independent	Naioma Chase^{†}	275	43.58	+1.91
Informal votes		0	0.00	+0.00
Blank votes		21	3.33	+0.48
Turnout		631	45.14	+11.19
Registered electors		1,398		
Independent gain from Independent				
^{†} incumbent

=== Referendum on Māori wards ===
Choice	Votes	%
I vote to REMOVE Māori wards	3,576	53.98
I vote to KEEP Māori wards	3,049	46.02
Total	6,625	100.00
Valid votes	6,625	93.07
Invalid votes	0	0.00
Blank votes	493	6.93
Total votes	7,118	100.00
Registered voters/turnout	12,835	55.46
Source: electionz.com & MCERT

== Horowhenua District Council ==
2025 Horowhenua District Council election
- 11 October 2025
- Turnout: 12,214 (47.44% ▲1.30 pp)
- Mayor
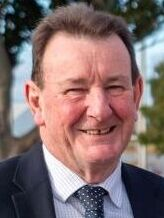
		Ind
Candidate	Bernie Wanden	Justin Tamihana
Party	Independent	Independent
Popular vote	9,017	2,889
Percentage	73.83%	23.65%
Mayor before election
Bernie Wanden
Independent
Elected mayor
Bernie Wanden
Independent
- Councillors
- 12 seats on the governing body of Horowhenua District Council; 7 seats needed for a majority
Party	Seats	+/–
Independent	12	0
This lists parties that won seats. See the complete results below.
Control before	Control after
No majority	No majority

=== 2025 Horowhenua mayoral election ===
2025 Horowhenua mayoral election
Party	Candidate	Votes	%	±%
Independent	Bernie Wanden^{†}	9,017	73.83	+24.38
Independent	Justin Tamihana	2,889	23.65	(new)
Informal votes		5	0.04	−0.10
Blank votes		302	2.47	+1.26
Turnout		12,214	47.44	+1.30
Registered electors		25,745		
Independent hold				
^{†} incumbent

=== Kere Kere general ward ===
2025 Kere Kere general ward election
Party	Candidate	Votes	%	±%
Independent	David Allan^{†}	989	52.44	−0.84
Independent	Nola Fox	745	39.50	(new)
Independent	Justin Tamihana	641	33.99	(new)
Independent	Trevor James Chambers	585	31.02	(new)
Independent	Brett Russell	474	25.13	−13.53
Informal votes		0	0.00	−0.17
Blank votes		41	2.17	+0.71
Turnout		1,886	48.27	+4.68
Registered electors		3,907		
Independent hold				
Independent gain from Independent				
^{†} incumbent

=== Miranui general ward ===
2025 Miranui general ward election
Party	Candidate	Votes	%	±%
Independent	Paul Olsen^{†}	568	64.69	−4.21
Independent	Susan Conway	299	34.05	(new)
Informal votes		0	0.00	+0.00
Blank votes		11	1.25	−0.01
Turnout		878	48.48	+9.60
Registered electors		1,811		
Independent hold				
^{†} incumbent

=== Levin general ward ===
2025 Levin general ward election
Party	Candidate	Votes	%	±%
Independent	Jo Mason	2,997	61.84	(new)
Independent	Clint Grimstone^{†}	2,574	53.12	+3.52
Independent	Alan Young^{†}	2,529	52.19	+2.88
Independent	Mike Barker^{†}	2,037	42.03	+4.35
Independent	Katrina Mitchell-Kouttab	1,902	39.25	(new)
Independent	Catriona Finau McKay	1,645	33.95	(new)
Independent	Tony Collis	1,640	33.84	(new)
Independent	Keremihana Heke	946	19.52	(new)
Independent	Viv Bold	928	19.15	(new)
Independent	Avril Lang	828	17.09	(new)
Independent	André Thompson	742	15.31	(new)
Independent	Jane Masoe	609	12.57	(new)
Independent	Glen Stevenson	484	9.99	(new)
Independent	Don Campbell	360	7.43	(new)
Informal votes		9	0.19	+0.02
Blank votes		70	1.44	−1.86
Turnout		4,846	43.67	−3.16
Registered electors		11,098		
Independent gain from Independent				
Independent hold				
Independent hold				
Independent hold				
Independent gain from Independent				
^{†} incumbent

=== Waiopehu general ward ===
2025 Waiopehu general ward election
Party	Candidate	Votes	%	±%
Independent	Sam Jennings	1,667	50.32	(new)
Independent	Morgan Gray	1,142	34.47	(new)
Independent	Judy Webby	1,134	34.23	(new)
Independent	Dan Okano	944	28.49	(new)
Independent	Bruce Eccles	905	27.32	(new)
Independent	William Ranginui	210	6.34	(new)
Informal votes		2	0.06	+0.06
Blank votes		76	2.29	−7.18
Turnout		3,313	56.33	−0.06
Registered electors		5,881		
Independent gain from Independent				
Independent gain from Independent				

=== Horowhenua Māori ward ===
Horowhenua Māori ward
Affiliation	Candidate	Votes	%
Independent	Nina Hori Te Pa^{†}	735	
Independent	Lani Te Raukura Ketu	581	
Independent	Kelly Tahiwi	539	
Independent	Troy O'Carroll	351	
Informal		2	
Blank		28	
Turnout			
Registered			
Independent hold			
Independent gain from Independent			
^{†} incumbent

=== Referendum on Māori wards ===
Choice	Votes	%
I vote to REMOVE Māori wards	5,935	50.80
I vote to KEEP Māori wards	5,747	49.20
Total	11,682	100.00
Valid votes	11,682	95.65
Invalid votes	2	0.02
Blank votes	529	4.33
Total votes	12,213	100.00
Registered voters/turnout	25,745	47.44
Source: electionz.com & MCERT

== See also ==
- 2025 Horizons Regional Council election
