= Results of the 2025 New Zealand territorial authority elections in the Bay of Plenty =

2025 New Zealand territorial authority elections (Bay of Plenty)
- 11 October 2025
- Turnout: 55,326 (43.25% ▼1.00 pp)
- 5 of 6 local councils
Party	Councils	+/–
No majority	5	0
This lists parties that won seats. See the complete results below.
- 5 mayors and 44 local councillors
Party	Seats	+/–
Mayors
Independent	4	−1
Independent Green	1	+1
Local councillors
Independent	43	0
Te Pāti Māori	1	+1
This lists parties that won seats. See the complete results below.

Elections for the territorial authorities of New Zealand were held from 9 September until 11 October 2025 as part of that year's nation-wide local elections. 709 local councillors and 66 mayors were elected across 66 of 67 councils.

6 territorial authorities are primarily located within the Bay of Plenty Region. Tauranga did not hold elections as the city had held elections the previous year. 5 mayors and 44 district councillors were elected. 4 of 5 mayors were re-elected and no group gained or held a majority on any council.

== Maps ==

Legend
Independent hold	Independent gain
	Independent Green gain
	Te Pāti Māori gain

== Summary ==
=== Overall ===
Council	Electoral system	Seats	Mayor	Councillors	Control	Turnout	Details	Refs
Western Bay of Plenty	FPP	9	▌ Independent hold	▌ Independent 9 ( 0)	▌ No majority	15,299; 38.20% ▲0.55 pp	Details	
Rotorua	FPP	10	▌ Independent hold	▌ Independent 9 ( 0) ▌ Te Pāti Māori 1 (▲1)	▌ No majority	21,795; 43.52% ▼4.41 pp	Details	
Whakatāne	FPP	10	▌ Independent Green gain	▌ Independent 10 ( 0)	▌ No majority	12,824; 49.20% ▲3.95 pp	Details	
Kawerau	FPP	8	▌ Independent hold	▌ Independent 8 ( 0)	▌ No majority	2,345; 45.31% ▲3.16 pp	Details	
Kawerau	FPP	7	▌ Independent hold	▌ Independent 7 ( 0)	▌ No majority	3,063; 46.81% ▼7.09 pp	Details	
5 of 6 councils		44						

=== Mayors ===
Council	Incumbent	Elected	Runner-up	Details	Refs
Western Bay of Plenty	James Denyer (Ind)		Margaret Murray-Benge (Ind)	Details	
Rotorua	Tania Tapsell (Ind)		Don Paterson (Ind)	Details	
Whakatāne	Victor Luca (Ind)	Nándor Tánczos (Ind Green)	Victor Luca (Ind)	Details	
Kawerau	Faylene Tunui (Ind)		Carolyn Ion (Ind)	Details	
Ōpōtiki	David Moore (Ind)		Curley Keno (Ind)	Details	

=== Candidates ===
Party / ticket	Mayors				Councillors			
Party / ticket	2022	Candidates	Elected	+/−	2022	Candidates	Elected	+/−
Independent	5	22	4	▼1	43	94	43	0
Independent Green	0	1	1	▲1	no candidates			
Te Pāti Māori	no candidates				0	1	1	▲1
Residents & Ratepayers	no candidates				1	1	0	▼1
Seats:	5		5	0	44		44	0

== Western Bay of Plenty District Council ==
2025 Western Bay of Plenty District Council election
- 11 October 2025
- Turnout: 15,299 (38.20% ▲0.55 pp)
- Mayor
	Ind	Ind	Ind
Candidate	James Denyer	Margaret Murray-Benge	Rodney Joyce
Party	Independent	Independent	Independent
Popular vote	4,424	2,737	1,890
Percentage	28.92%	17.89%	12.35%
	Ind	Ind	Ind
Candidate	Grant Dally	Don Thwaites	John Holyoake
Party	Independent	Independent	Independent
Popular vote	1,743	1,596	1,191
Percentage	11.39%	10.43%	7.78%
Mayor before election
James Denyer
Independent
Elected mayor
James Denyer
Independent
- Councillors
- 9 seats on the governing body Western Bay of Plenty District Council; 5 seats needed for a majority
Party	Seats	+/–
Independent	9	0
This lists parties that won seats. See the complete results below.
Control before	Control after
No majority	No majority

=== 2025 Western Bay of Plenty mayoral election ===
2025 Western Bay of Plenty mayoral election
Party	Candidate	Votes	%	±%
Independent	James Denyer^{†}	4,424	28.92	+0.32
Independent	Margaret Murray-Benge	2,737	17.89	(new)
Independent	Rodney Joyce	1,890	12.35	+2.98
Independent	Grant Dally	1,743	11.39	(new)
Independent	Don Thwaites	1,596	10.43	−5.96
Independent	John Holyoake	1,191	7.78	(new)
Independent	Suaree Borell	951	6.22	+1.70
Independent	Danielle Borell-Faa'soo	295	1.93	(new)
Informal votes		57	0.37	+0.17
Blank votes		414	2.71	+0.71
Turnout		15,299	38.20	+0.55
Registered electors		40,045		
Independent hold				
^{†} incumbent

=== Katikati-Waihī Beach general ward ===
2025 Katikati-Waihī Beach general ward election
Party	Candidate	Votes	%	±%
Independent	Allan Sole^{†}	2,036	43.94	+0.11
Independent	Rodney Joyce^{†}	1,919	41.41	+6.06
Independent	John Clements	1,350	29.13	−1.27
Independent	Andy Earl	1,315	28.38	(new)
Independent	Wayne Stevenson	1,205	26.00	(new)
Independent	Candice Thomas	559	12.06	(new)
Informal votes		16	0.35	−0.45
Blank votes		93	2.01	+0.21
Turnout		4,634	42.75	+0.35
Registered electors		10,840		
Independent hold				
Independent hold				
^{†} incumbent

=== Maketu-Te Puke general ward ===
2025 Maketu-Te Puke general ward election
Party	Candidate	Votes	%	±%
Independent	Shane William Beech	2,147	55.44	(new)
Independent	Grant Dally^{†}	2,068	53.40	+8.94
Independent	Laura Rae	1,550	40.02	(new)
Independent	Andy Wichers^{†}	1,416	36.56	−1.44
Independent	Manvir Singh Mann	1,025	26.47	(new)
Independent	John Bowden	783	20.22	(new)
Informal votes		2	0.05	−0.39
Blank votes		75	1.94	+0.42
Turnout		3,873	36.13	+3.17
Registered electors		10,720		
Independent gain from Independent				
Independent hold				
Independent gain from Independent				
^{†} incumbent

=== Kaimai general ward ===
2025 Kaimai general ward election
Party	Candidate	Votes	%	±%
Independent	Margaret Murray-Benge^{†}	2,419	44.94	−7.17
Independent	Tracey Coxhead^{†}	2,383	44.27	−8.90
Independent	Graeme Elvin	2,039	37.88	(new)
Independent	Murray Grainger^{†}	1,909	35.46	−16.83
Independent	Don Thwaites^{†}	1,875	34.83	−22.41
Independent	Chris Dever	1,867	34.68	(new)
Independent	Drew Cowley	681	12.65	(new)
Independent	Danielle Borell-Faa'soo	460	8.55	(new)
Independent	Destiny Leaf	456	8.47	(new)
Informal votes		3	0.06	+0.06
Blank votes		88	1.63	−0.64
Turnout		5,383	37.34	+0.00
Registered electors		14,417		
Independent hold				
Independent hold				
Independent gain from Independent				
^{†} incumbent

=== Waka Kai Uru Māori ward ===
2025 Waka Kai Uru Māori ward election
Party	Candidate	Votes	%	±%
Independent	Darlene Dinsdale	531	37.69	(new)
Independent	Carlton Bidois	421	29.88	(new)
Independent	Suaree Borell	421	29.88	(new)
Informal votes		1	0.07	n/a
Blank votes		35	2.48	n/a
Turnout		1,409	34.64	n/a
Registered electors		4,068		
Independent win (new seat)				

=== Referendum on Māori wards ===
Choice	Votes	%
I vote to REMOVE Māori wards	8,462	58.95
I vote to KEEP Māori wards	5,892	41.05
Total	14,354	100.00
Valid votes	14,354	93.83
Invalid votes	0	0.00
Blank votes	944	6.17
Total votes	15,298	100.00
Registered voters/turnout	40,045	38.20
Source: electionz.com & MCERT

== Rotorua Lakes Council ==
2025 Rotorua Lakes Council election
- 11 October 2025
- Turnout: 21,795 (43.52% ▼4.41 pp)
- Mayor
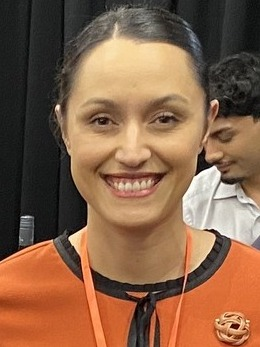
		Ind
Candidate	Tania Tapsell	Don Paterson
Party	Independent	Independent
Popular vote	12,380	2,952
Percentage	56.80%	13.54%
	Ind	Ind
Candidate	Robert Lee	Haehaetu Barrett
Party	Independent	Independent
Popular vote	2,822	2,752
Percentage	12.95%	12.63%
Mayor before election
Tania Tapsell
Independent
Elected mayor
Tania Tapsell
Independent
- Councillors
- 10 seats on the governing body of Rotorua Lakes Council; 6 seats needed for a majority
Party	Seats	+/–
Independent	9	0
Te Pāti Māori	1	+1
This lists parties that won seats. See the complete results below.
Control before	Control after
No majority	No majority

=== 2025 Rotorua mayoral election ===
2025 Rotorua mayoral election
Party	Candidate	Votes	%	±%
Independent	Tania Tapsell^{†}	12,380	56.80	+25.66
Independent	Don Paterson	2,952	13.54	(new)
Independent	Robert Lee	2,822	12.95	(new)
Independent	Haehaetu Barrett	2,752	12.63	(new)
Independent	Takeina Fraser	468	2.15	(new)
Informal votes		35	0.16	+0.04
Blank votes		386	1.77	+0.90
Turnout		21,795	43.52	−4.41
Registered electors		50,082		
Independent hold				
^{†} incumbent

=== Rural general ward ===
2025 Rural general ward election
Party	Candidate	Votes	%	±%
Independent	Karen Barker^{†}	elected unopposed		
Registered electors		4,600		
Independent hold				
^{†} incumbent

=== Te Ipu Wai Auraki general ward ===
2025 Te Ipu Wai Auraki general ward election
Party	Candidate	Votes	%	±%
Independent	Fisher Wang^{†}	7,199	48.87	+1.54
Independent	Sandra Kai Fong^{†}	6,915	46.94	−0.01
Independent	Ben Sandford	6,686	45.39	(new)
Independent	Gregg Brown^{†}	5,421	36.80	−2.80
Independent	Don Paterson^{†}	4,850	32.92	+2.81
Independent	Robert Lee^{†}	4,555	30.92	−1.40
Independent	Philly Angus	4,298	29.18	(new)
Independent	Conan O'Brien^{†}	4,282	29.07	−0.45
Independent	Ryan Gray	4,259	28.91	+1.41
Independent	Jenny Chapman	3,901	26.48	(new)
Residents & Ratepayers	Reynold MacPherson	3,851	26.14	(new)
Independent	Brendan Davis	3,379	22.94	−2.30
Independent	Jared Adams	2,246	15.25	(new)
Independent	Mathew Doidge	2,104	14.28	(new)
Independent	Pam Neilson	2,067	14.03	(new)
Independent	Mariana Morrison	1,995	13.54	(new)
Independent	Neville Raethel	1,715	11.64	(new)
Independent	Frank (The Tank) Grapl	1,356	9.21	(new)
Independent	Richard Collins	1,306	8.87	(new)
Independent	Rahul Sethi	1,257	8.53	(new)
Independent	Takeina Fraser	711	4.83	(new)
Independent	Jason Monahan	638	4.33	(new)
Informal votes		48	0.33	+0.15
Blank votes		133	0.90	−0.13
Turnout		14,731	45.93	−6.94
Registered electors		32,076		
Independent hold				
Independent hold				
Independent gain from Residents & Ratepayers				
Independent hold				
Independent hold				
Independent hold				
^{†} incumbent

=== Te Ipu Wai Taketake Māori ward ===
2025 Te Ipu Wai Taketake Māori ward election
Party	Candidate	Votes	%	±%
Te Pāti Māori	Te Rika Temara-Benfell	2,768	54.98	(new)
Independent	Trevor Horowaewae Maxwell^{†}	2,739	54.40	+7.29
Independent	Merepeka Raukawa-Tait	2,328	46.24	(new)
Independent	Rawiri Waru^{†}	2,266	45.00	+1.35
Independent	Harina Rinaha Rupapera	1,308	25.98	(new)
Independent	Te Whatanui Skipwith	1,284	25.50	(new)
Informal votes		1	0.02	+0.00
Blank votes		42	0.83	−4.09
Turnout		5,035	37.56	+4.62
Registered electors		13,406		
Te Pāti Māori gain from Independent				
Independent hold				
Independent gain from Independent				
^{†} incumbent

=== Referendum on Māori wards ===
Choice	Votes	%
I vote to KEEP Māori wards	11,363	57.19
I vote to REMOVE Māori wards	8,507	42.81
Total	19,870	100.00
Valid votes	19,870	91.17
Invalid votes	3	0.01
Blank votes	1,922	8.82
Total votes	21,795	100.00
Registered voters/turnout	50,082	43.52
Source: electionz.com & MCERT

== Whakatāne District Council ==
2025 Whakatāne District Council election
- 11 October 2025
- Turnout: 12,824 (49.20% ▲3.95 pp)
- Mayor
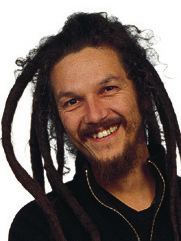

			Ind
Candidate	Nándor Tánczos	Victor Luca	Mark Inman
Party	Independent Green	Independent	Independent
Popular vote	3,713	3,569	1,698
Percentage	28.95%	27.83%	13.24%
	Ind	Ind	Ind
Candidate	Andrew Iles	Philip Jacobs	Philip Jacobs
Party	Independent	Independent	Independent
Popular vote	1,559	1,317	834
Percentage	12.16%	10.27%	6.50%
Mayor before election
Victor Luca
Independent
Elected mayor
Nandor Tanczos
Independent Green
- Councillors
- 10 seats on the governing body of Whakatāne District Council; 6 seats needed for a majority
Party	Seats	+/–
Independent	10	0
This lists parties that won seats. See the complete results below.
Control before	Control after
No majority	No majority

=== 2025 Whakatāne mayoral election ===
2025 Whakatāne mayoral election
Party	Candidate	Votes	%	±%
Independent Green	Nándor Tánczos	3,713	28.95	+8.73
Independent	Victor Luca^{†}	3,569	27.83	+0.57
Independent	Mark Inman	1,698	13.24	(new)
Independent	Andrew Iles	1,559	12.16	(new)
Independent	Philip Jacobs	1,317	10.27	(new)
Independent	Wilson James	834	6.50	(new)
Informal votes		24	0.19	−0.01
Blank votes		377	2.94	+2.19
Turnout		12,824	49.20	+3.95
Registered electors		26,066		
Independent Green gain from Independent				
^{†} incumbent

=== Whakatāne-Ōhope general ward ===
2025 Whakatāne-Ōhope general ward election
Party	Candidate	Votes	%	±%
Independent	Carolyn Louise Hamill	4,211	68.19	+32.44
Independent	Lesley Immink^{†}	3,225	52.23	+9.43
Independent	Julie Claire Jukes^{†}	3,033	49.12	+12.30
Independent	Malcolm Whitaker	2,575	41.70	(new)
Independent	Brendan Horan	2,413	39.08	(new)
Independent	Chris Barnard	2,084	33.75	(new)
Independent	Dave Stewart	1,994	32.29	(new)
Informal votes		15	0.24	−0.04
Blank votes		153	2.48	+1.77
Turnout		6,175	55.51	+6.06
Registered electors		11,124		
Independent gain from Independent				
Independent hold				
Independent hold				
Independent gain from Independent				
^{†} incumbent

=== Te Urewera general ward ===
2025 Te Urewera general ward election
Party	Candidate	Votes	%	±%
Independent	Andrew Iles^{†}	elected unopposed		
Registered electors		2,189		
Independent hold				
^{†} incumbent

=== Rangitāiki general ward ===
2025 Rangitāiki general ward election
Party	Candidate	Votes	%	±%
Independent	Gavin Dennis^{†}	elected unopposed		
Independent	Wilson James^{†}	elected unopposed		
Registered electors		4,746		
Independent hold				
Independent hold				
^{†} incumbent

=== Rangitāiki Māori ward ===
2025 Rangitāiki Māori ward election
Party	Candidate	Votes	%	±%
Independent	Tu O'Brien^{†}	660	61.22	+3.13
Independent	Rihi Vercoe	385	35.71	(new)
Informal votes		2	0.19	−0.87
Blank votes		31	2.88	−3.63
Turnout		1,078	45.05	+14.87
Registered electors		2,393		
Independent hold				
^{†} incumbent

=== Kāpū-te-rangi Māori ward ===
2025 Kāpū te rangi Māori ward election
Party	Candidate	Votes	%	±%
Independent	Toni Boynton^{†}	779	75.63	n/a
Independent	Hiria Wallace	228	22.14	(new)
Informal votes		0	0.00	n/a
Blank votes		23	2.23	n/a
Turnout		1,030	37.80	n/a
Registered electors		2,725		
Independent hold				
^{†} incumbent

=== Toi ki Uta Māori ward ===
2025 Toi ki Uta Māori ward election
Party	Candidate	Votes	%	±%
Independent	Jesse Wayne Morgan-Ranui	807	71.04	(new)
Independent	Glenn McGahan	269	23.68	(new)
Informal votes		0	0.00	+0.00
Blank votes		60	5.28	+2.10
Turnout		1,136	39.32	+11.95
Registered electors		2,889		
Independent gain from Independent				

=== Referendum on Māori wards ===
Choice	Votes	%
I vote to KEEP Māori wards	7,484	60.55
I vote to REMOVE Māori wards	4,877	39.45
Total	12,361	100.00
Registered voters/turnout	26,066	–
Source: WDC & MCERT

== Kawerau District Council ==
2025 Kawerau District Council election
- 11 October 2025
- Turnout: 2,345 (45.31% ▲3.16 pp)
- Mayor
	Ind	Ind
Candidate	Faylene Tunui	Carolyn Ion
Party	Independent	Independent
Popular vote	1,663	660
Percentage	70.91%	28.14%
Mayor before election
Faylene Tunui
Independent
Elected mayor
Faylene Tunui
Independent
- Councillors
- 8 seats on the governing body of Kawerau District Council; 5 seats needed for a majority
Party	Seats	+/–
Independent	8	0
This lists parties that won seats. See the complete results below.
Control before	Control after
No majority	No majority

=== 2025 Kawerau mayoral election ===
2025 Kawerau mayoral election
Party	Candidate	Votes	%	±%
Independent	Faylene Karen Ngareta Tunui^{†}	1,663	70.92	n/a
Independent	Carolyn Ion	660	28.14	(new)
Informal votes		0	0.00	n/a
Blank votes		22	0.94	n/a
Turnout		2,345	45.31	n/a
Registered electors		5,175		
Independent hold				
^{†} incumbent

=== At-large ===
2025 District-wide ward election
Party	Candidate	Votes	%	±%
Independent	Sela Kingi^{†}	1,397	59.57	−6.54
Independent	Berice Joyce Julian^{†}	1,332	56.80	−6.49
Independent	Carolyn Ion^{†}	1,086	46.31	−18.83
Independent	Wayne Andrews	462	19.70	(new)
Informal votes		11	0.47	+0.28
Blank votes		31	1.32	+1.09
Turnout		2,345	45.31	+3.16
Registered electors		5,175		
Independent hold				
Independent hold				
^{†} incumbent

=== Kawerau general ward ===
2025 Kawerau general ward election
Party	Candidate	Votes	%	±%
Independent	Justin Ross	1,083	72.54	(new)
Independent	Anthony Ross Worsley	838	56.13	(new)
Independent	Tracy Hill	643	43.07	(new)
Independent	Melissa Joy Drummond	307	20.56	(new)
Informal votes		2	0.13	n/a
Blank votes		24	1.61	n/a
Turnout		1,493	48.07	n/a
Registered electors		3,106		
Independent win (new seat)				
Independent win (new seat)				
Independent win (new seat)				

=== Kawerau Māori ward ===
2025 Kawerau Māori ward election
Party	Candidate	Votes	%	±%
Independent	Waikite Apiata	667	78.29	(new)
Independent	Gloria Te Paki Leokava-Taani	493	57.86	(new)
Independent	Mal Dowie	453	53.17	(new)
Independent	Lyzette Howard	407	47.77	(new)
Informal votes		1	0.12	n/a
Blank votes		8	0.94	n/a
Turnout		852	41.18	n/a
Registered electors		2,069		
Independent win (new seat)				
Independent win (new seat)				
Independent win (new seat)				

=== Referendum on Māori wards ===
Choice	Votes	%
I vote to KEEP Māori wards	1,557	68.68
I vote to REMOVE Māori wards	710	31.32
Total	2,267	100.00
Valid votes	2,267	96.67
Invalid votes	3	0.13
Blank votes	75	3.20
Total votes	2,345	100.00
Registered voters/turnout	5,175	45.31
Source: KDC & MCERT

== Ōpōtiki District Council ==
2025 Ōpōtiki District Council election
- 11 October 2025
- Turnout: 3,063 (46.81% ▼7.09 pp)
- Mayor
	Ind	Ind
Candidate	David Moore	Curley Keno
Party	Independent	Independent
Popular vote	2,141	786
Percentage	71.97%	26.42%
Mayor before election
David Moore
Independent
Elected mayor
David Moore
Independent
- Councillors
- 7 seats on the governing body of Ōpōtiki District Council; 4 seats needed for a majority
Party	Seats	+/–
Independent	7	0
This lists parties that won seats. See the complete results below.
Control before	Control after
No majority	No majority

=== 2025 Ōpōtiki mayoral election ===
2025 Ōpōtiki mayoral election
Party	Candidate	Votes	%	±%
Independent	David Moore^{†}	2,141	69.90	+25.36
Independent	Curley Keno	786	25.66	(new)
Informal votes		1	0.03	−0.08
Blank votes		47	1.53	+0.79
Turnout		3,063	46.81	−7.09
Registered electors		6,543		
Independent hold				
^{†} incumbent

=== Urban general ward ===
2025 Urban general ward election
Party	Candidate	Votes	%	±%
Independent	Shona Browne^{†}	518	47.13	−8.74
Independent	Barry Howe^{†}	491	44.68	−24.08
Independent	Lyn Riesterer	185	16.83	(new)
Independent	Alex Le Long	150	13.65	(new)
Independent	Simon David Prout	51	4.64	(new)
Informal votes		0	0.00	+0.00
Blank votes		8	0.73	−0.30
Turnout		1,099	54.65	+2.84
Registered electors		2,011		
Independent hold				
Independent hold				
^{†} incumbent

=== Rural general ward ===
2025 Rural general ward election
Party	Candidate	Votes	%	±%
Independent	Dean Petersen	529	68.97	(new)
Independent	Steven Gordon Nelson	479	62.45	(new)
Independent	Chris Hopman	398	51.89	(new)
Independent	Caitlin Papuni-McLellan	386	50.33	(new)
Independent	Jodi Porter	181	23.60	(new)
Informal votes		1	0.13	n/a
Blank votes		11	1.43	n/a
Turnout		767	47.32	n/a
Registered electors		1,621		
Independent win (new seat)				
Independent win (new seat)				

=== Coast Māori ward ===
2025 Coast Māori ward election
Party	Candidate	Votes	%	±%
Independent	Pāpā Wharewera	277	71.95	(new)
Independent	Haki McRoberts	92	23.90	(new)
Informal votes		0	0.00	n/a
Blank votes		9	2.34	n/a
Turnout		385	40.53	n/a
Registered electors		950		
Independent win (new seat)				

=== Ōpōtiki Māori ward ===
2025 Ōpōtiki Māori ward election
Party	Candidate	Votes	%	±%
Independent	Maude Maxwell	510	62.81	(new)
Independent	Curley Keno	397	48.89	(new)
Independent	Linda Steel	319	39.29	(new)
Informal votes		1	0.12	n/a
Blank votes		8	0.99	n/a
Turnout		812	41.41	n/a
Registered electors		1,961		
Independent win (new seat)				
Independent win (new seat)				

== See also ==
- 2025 Bay of Plenty Regional Council election
