= 2025 Gisborne District Council election =

Local elections in New Zealand

- 11 October 2025
- Turnout: 16,377 (48.07% ▲4.66 pp)
- Mayor
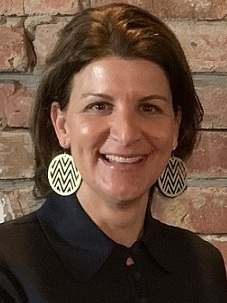
| | | Ind | Ind |
| Candidate | Rehette Stoltz | Colin Alder | Jono Samson |
| Party | Independent | Independent | Independent |
| Popular vote | 8,147 | 5,984 | 1,851 |
| Percentage | 49.75% | 36.54% | 11.30% |
Mayor before election
Rehette Stoltz
Independent
Elected mayor
Rehette Stoltz
Independent
- Councillors
- 13 seats on the governing body of Gisborne District Council; 8 seats needed for a majority
| Party | Seats | +/– |
|---|---|---|
| Independent | 13 | 0 |
This lists parties that won seats. See the complete results below.
| Control before | Control after |
|---|---|
| No majority | No majority |

The 2025 Gisborne District Council election was a local election held from 9 September to 11 October in the Gisborne District of New Zealand as part of that year's nation-wide local elections. Voters elected the mayor of Gisborne and 13 district councillors for the 2025–2028 term of the Gisborne District Council. Postal voting and the single transferable voting system were used.

Incumbent mayor Rehette Stoltz was re-elected to a third-term.

The council introduced a Māori ward at the 2022 election. In a referendum on its future held at this election, as part of a nation-wide series of referendums, voters elected to retain the Māori ward.

== Key dates ==
- 4 July 2025: Nominations for candidates opens.
- 1 August 2025: Nominations for candidates close at 12 noon.
- 9–22 September 2025: Voting documents delivered to enrolled voters and voting opens.
- 11 October 2025: Voting closes at 12 noon. Progress/preliminary results published
- 13–17 October 2025: Official count and final results announced.
- 17 October 2025: Final results declared by public notice.

== Background ==
=== Positions up for election ===
Voters in the district elected the mayor of Gisborne and 13 district councillors in 2 wards.

== List of candidates ==
=== Incumbents not seeking re-election ===
- Ani Pahuru-Huriwai, councillor for the Māori ward since 2022
- Tony Robinson, councillor for the general ward, resigned to take up the position of key account manager for the council
- Josh Wharehinga, deputy mayor and councillor since 2014

=== Mayor ===
| Candidate | Affiliation (Note: A candidate may leave their affiliation blank, run as an independent, or run with an affiliation to an organisation, local body ticket or political party. Gisborne District Council does not allow election slogans to be used for the affiliation.) | Notes |
|---|---|---|
| Colin Alder | None | Incumbent councillor. Also ran for re-election as a councillor for the Tairāwhiti general ward. |
| Jono Samson | None | Former contestant on Lego Masters NZ. Also ran to be a councillor for the Tairāwhiti general ward. |
| Rehette Stoltz | None | Incumbent mayor since 2019 |

=== Councillors ===
==== Tairāwhiti Māori ward ====
Tairāwhiti Māori ward returned five councillors to the district council.

| Candidate | Affiliation | Notes |
|---|---|---|
| Jackie Akuhata-Brown | None | |
| Raawiri Gilgen | None | |
| Chris Haenga | None | |
| Anne Huriwai | None | |
| Mateawa Keelan | None | |
| Elizabeth Kerekere | None | Former Green Party MP (2020–2023) |
| Rawinia Parata | None | Incumbent councillor since 2022 |
| Aubrey Ria | None | Incumbent councillor since 2022 |
| Kat Taylor | None | |
| Rhonda Tibble | None | Incumbent councillor since 2022 |
| Nick Tupara | None | Incumbent councillor since 2022 |

==== Tairāwhiti General ward ====
The Tairāwhiti General ward returned eight councillors to the district council.

| Candidate | Affiliation | Notes |
|---|---|---|
| Colin Adler | None | Incumbent councillor. Also ran for mayor. |
| Ian Allan | None | |
| Alexandra Boros | Independent | Artist and interior designer |
| Darin Brown | None | Previously ran for mayor and for the council in the Māori ward in 2022 |
| Grant Brown | None | |
| Marcel Campbell | Independent | |
| Andy Cranston | None | Incumbent councillor for over 20 years |
| Jodie Curtis | None | |
| Larry Foster | None | Incumbent councillor since 2016 |
| Samuel Gibson | None | Author and conservationist known as "Sam the Trap Man" |
| Debbie Gregory | Independent | Incumbent councillor since 2019 |
| Gazza McKenzie | None | |
| Jeremy Muir | None | Former editor of the Gisborne Herald. |
| Ian George Procter | Independent | Former public servant. Previously ran for council in the Māori ward in 2022. |
| Jono Samson | None | |
| Rob Telfer | None | Incumbent councillor |
| Teddy Thompson | Independent | Incumbent councillor |
| Jordan Walker | None | Green Party endorsed |
| Blake Neil Webb | None | |

== Results ==
Overall turnout for the election was 48.1% (50.3% in the general ward, and 43.8% in the Māori ward), with 16,377 voting papers returned. This was up from a turnout of 43.4% in the 2022 election, but down from a turnout of 50.1% in the 2019 election. Gisborne's turnout was 8.7% higher than the national average for this years elections.

=== 2025 Gisborne mayoral election ===
2025 Gisborne mayoral election
| Party | Candidate | Primary votes | % | ±% | Iteration | |
| Party | Candidate | Primary votes | % | ±% | # | Votes |
|---|---|---|---|---|---|---|
| Independent | Rehette Stoltz^{†} | 8,147 | 49.75 | −4.59 | 1st | 8,147 |
| Independent | Colin Alder | 5,984 | 36.54 | +16.57 | 1st | 5,984 |
| Independent | Jono Samson | 1,851 | 11.30 | (new) | 1st | 1,851 |
| Quota | | 7,991 | 48.79 | −0.42 | | |
| Informal votes | | 46 | 0.28 | +0.04 | | |
| Blank votes | | 349 | 2.13 | +0.79 | | |
| Turnout | | 16,377 | 48.07 | +4.66 | | |
| Registered electors | | 34,067 | | | | |
| Independent hold on 1st iteration | | | | | | |
^{†} incumbent

=== Tairāwhiti general ward ===
2025 Tairāwhiti general ward election
| Party | Candidate | Primary votes | % | ±% | Iteration | |
| Party | Candidate | Primary votes | % | ±% | # | Votes |
|---|---|---|---|---|---|---|
| Independent | Colin Alder^{†} | 2,682 | 23.87 | n/a | 1st | 2,682 |
| Independent | Rob Telfer^{†} | 931 | 8.28 | n/a | 3rd | 1,207 |
| Independent | Samuel Oak Vette Gibson | 1,008 | 8.97 | (new) | 10th | 1,230 |
| Independent | Jeremy Muir | 943 | 8.39 | (new) | 10th | 1,219 |
| Independent | Alexandra Boros | 679 | 6.04 | (new) | 17th | 1,211 |
| Independent | Debbie Gregory^{†} | 636 | 5.66 | n/a | 19th | 1,167 |
| Independent | Larry Foster^{†} | 645 | 5.74 | n/a | 21st | 1,175 |
| Independent | Teddy Thompson^{†} | 516 | 4.59 | n/a | 23rd | 1,159 |
| Independent | Andy Cranston^{†} | 512 | 4.56 | n/a | 23rd | 1,022 |
| Independent Green | Jordan Walker | 382 | 3.40 | n/a | 18th | 675 |
| Independent | Ian James Allan | 357 | 3.18 | (new) | 16th | 550 |
| Independent | Grant Brown | 235 | 2.09 | (new) | 14th | 492 |
| Independent | Jono Samson | 265 | 2.36 | (new) | 11th | 385 |
| Independent | Marcel Archibald Campbell | 254 | 2.26 | (new) | 9th | 342 |
| Independent | Ian George Procter | 273 | 2.43 | (new) | 8th | 326 |
| Independent | Darin Brown | 235 | 2.09 | (new) | 6th | 287 |
| Independent | Jodie John Curtis | 139 | 1.24 | (new) | 4th | 160 |
| Independent | Blake Neil Webb | 109 | 0.97 | (new) | 3rd | 127 |
| Independent | Gazza McKenzie | 43 | 0.38 | (new) | 2nd | 51 |
| Quota | | 1,210 | 10.77 | +0.03 | | |
| Informal votes | | 2,448 | 21.78 | +17.24 | | |
| Blank votes | | 97 | 0.86 | −0.27 | | |
| Turnout | | 11,238 | 50.31 | +2.32 | | |
| Registered electors | | 22,336 | | | | |
| Independent hold on 1st iteration | | | | | | |
| Independent hold on 3rd iteration | | | | | | |
| Independent gain from Independent on 10th iteration | | | | | | |
| Independent gain from Independent on 10th iteration | | | | | | |
| Independent gain from Independent on 17th iteration | | | | | | |
| Independent hold on 19th iteration | | | | | | |
| Independent hold on 21st iteration | | | | | | |
| Independent hold on 23rd iteration | | | | | | |
^{†} incumbent

=== Tairāwhiti Māori ward ===
2025 Tairāwhiti Māori ward election
| Party | Candidate | Primary votes | % | ±% | Iteration | |
| Party | Candidate | Primary votes | % | ±% | # | Votes |
|---|---|---|---|---|---|---|
| Independent | Aubrey Ria^{†} | 1,163 | 22.63 | n/a | 1st | 1,163 |
| Independent | Rhonda Tibble^{†} | 769 | 14.96 | n/a | 3rd | 844 |
| Independent | Rawinia Parata^{†} | 655 | 12.75 | n/a | 7th | 836 |
| Independent | Nick Tupara^{†} | 583 | 11.34 | n/a | 12th | 872 |
| Independent | Anne Huriwai | 466 | 9.07 | (new) | 16th | 803 |
| Independent | Chris Thomas Haenga | 402 | 7.82 | n/a | 16th | 722 |
| Independent | Elizabeth Kerekere | 365 | 7.10 | (new) | 11th | 515 |
| Independent | Raawiri Gilgen | 182 | 3.54 | (new) | 7th | 217 |
| Independent | Jackie Akuhata-Brown | 159 | 3.09 | (new) | 6th | 198 |
| Independent | Mateawa Keelan | 150 | 2.92 | (new) | 4th | 159 |
| Independent | Kat Taylor | 135 | 2.63 | (new) | 2nd | 146 |
| Quota | | 838 | 16.31 | +0.18 | | |
| Informal votes | | 81 | 1.58 | −0.50 | | |
| Blank votes | | 29 | 0.56 | −1.08 | | |
| Turnout | | 5,139 | 43.81 | +10.13 | | |
| Registered electors | | 11,731 | | | | |
| Independent hold on 1st iteration | | | | | | |
| Independent hold on 3rd iteration | | | | | | |
| Independent hold on 7th iteration | | | | | | |
| Independent hold on 12th iteration | | | | | | |
| Independent gain from Independent on 16th iteration | | | | | | |
^{†} incumbent

=== Referendum on Māori wards ===
| Choice | Votes | % |
|---|---|---|
| I vote to KEEP Māori wards | 9,904 | 63.45 |
| I vote to REMOVE Māori wards | 5,704 | 36.55 |
| Total | 15,608 | 100.00 |
| Valid votes | 15,608 | 95.30 |
| Invalid votes | 6 | 0.04 |
| Blank votes | 763 | 4.66 |
| Total votes | 16,377 | 100.00 |
| Registered voters/turnout | 34,067 | 48.07 |
Source: GDC & MCERT
