= 2025 New Zealand local elections =

- 11 October 2025
- Registered: 3,451,748
- Turnout: 1,362,667 (39.48% ▼1.13)
- 77 of 78 councils
Party	Councils	+/–
No majority	77	0
This lists parties that won seats. See the complete results below.
- 66 mayors, 709 local councillors, and 132 regional councillors
Party	Seats	+/–
Mayors
Independent	63	+2
Fix Auckland	1	+1
Labour	1	0
Green	1	0
Local councillors
Independent	641	−7
Labour	17	+2
Green	10	+1
ACT Local	6	+6
People's Choice	6	+1
Better Hamilton	4	+4
Te Pāti Māori	3	0
Fix Auckland	2	+2
Other local groups (Note: Includes groups not listed above; groups listed above include nation-wide groups, groups that elected a mayor, or groups with at least 3 councillors.)	20	−7
Regional councillors
Independents	108	−12
Rates Control	7	+7
Green	4	−3
People's Choice	3	+1
Vision Otago	3	+3
Labour	2	+1
Te Pāti Māori	2	+1
ACT Local	2	+2
Reform	1	+1
This lists parties that won seats. See the complete results below.

The 2025 New Zealand local elections (Māori: Nga Pōtitanga ā-Rohe 2025) were triennial elections held from 9 September until 11 October 2025 to elect local mayors and councillors, regional councillors, and members of various other local government bodies.

All 11 of New Zealand's regions and 66 of New Zealand's 67 cities and districts participated in the elections; 42 councils also held local referendums on the status of Māori wards. Tauranga City Council did not hold an election or a referendum as they recently held an election in 2024.

== Key dates ==
Key dates relating to the local elections are as follows:

4 July	Candidate nominations opened
10 July	Māori roll electoral option enrolment closed
1 August	Enrolment closed for the printed electoral roll
1 August	Candidate nominations close
6 August	Candidate names announced
9 September	Start of voting period
16–21 September	Voting documents sent to all enrolled voters by local councils
4 October	Last day to post ballot to ensure delivery
10 October	Last day to enrol to vote
11 October	Polling day — Voting closes midday Preliminary results to be released as soon as readily available afterwards.

== Background ==
Promotional logo used at these elections

=== Rates increases ===
Rate increases in the years preceding the election were reportedly high in several councils across the country. The aftermath of natural disasters in some parts of the country and long term rates increase deferrals were some of the things blamed. Incumbent Lower Hutt mayor Campbell Barry (who was not seeking re-election) warned voters to be wary of candidates who talked about lowering rates without detailing a plan on what would be cut to accommodate.

In late August 2025, the lobby group New Zealand Taxpayers' Union released its "Ratepayers Protection Pledge" for mayoral and council candidates to sign. The three-point pledge stated that signatories would oppose any increases to council rates and levies, support measures to improve transparency of council expenditure and oppose unelected appointments to council committees with spending and regulatory powers. In early September 2025, several Dunedin mayoral candidates including Marie Laufiso, Future Dunedin leader Andrew Simms and Green candidate Mickey Treadwell accused the Taxpayers' Union of bullying candidates and breaching impartiality rules. In response, the Taxpayer Union's head of communications Tony Relf rejected accusations of bullying and badgering, and claimed that the public supported a rates cap.

In mid-September 2025, a RNZ-Reid research poll found that 75.1% of New Zealanders supported the Government imposing a cap on local council rates. 14.1% of respondents opposed imposing a rates cap while 10.8% did not know. The poll also found that a rates cap was popular among voters across all political parties, particularly National Party (82.4%), ACT (91.9%) and New Zealand First (87.3%) voters. A plurality of self-identified Labour (70.2%), Green (56.2%) and Te Pāti Māori (59.7%) voters supported a rates cap.

=== Māori wards ===
In 2023, the newly-formed Sixth National Government and its coalition partners ACT and New Zealand First pledged to "restore the right of local referendum on the establishment or ongoing use of Māori wards and constituencies."

Under the government's change to the law, referendums will be held in 42 of the 45 local councils that had introduced Māori wards following the 2021 law change. Two councils, the Kaipara District Council and the Upper Hutt City Council, voted to disestablish their Māori wards rather than hold referendums.

=== Participation and turnout ===
There were concerns that the 2025 local elections will continue the pattern of decreasing participation, both in terms of number of candidates and in terms of turnout. Talking to Newsroom, Central Otago mayor Tamah Alley called it a "real concern" and a "threat to democracy". Similar concerns about the low number of candidates were expressed by Regional and Unitary Councils Aotearoa (Te Uru Kahika).

In the previous election, about two fifths of eligible electors voted. This follows the trend that has been almost continuous since the 1989 local government reforms, with 2010 being the only major blip due to the establishment of Auckland Council.

Local Government New Zealand formed an electoral reform working group, chaired by Nelson mayor Nick Smith, that delivered a report on 17 July. The report recommended that New Zealand implement in-person voting nationwide for local elections in 2028 (currently postal voting is used) and have the Electoral Commission take over the running of local elections (currently it is run by the councils themselves, usually with them hiring private companies such as ElectioNZ.com and Election Services).

The working group will also consider four year terms, similar to the incumbent National government's plans for parliament. The working group was not considering online voting.

Notable Asian candidates contesting the regional council elections have included Yadana Saw and Omar Faruque in Greater Wellington, Syed Khurram Iqbal in Hawke's Bay and Alan Wang in Environment Canterbury.

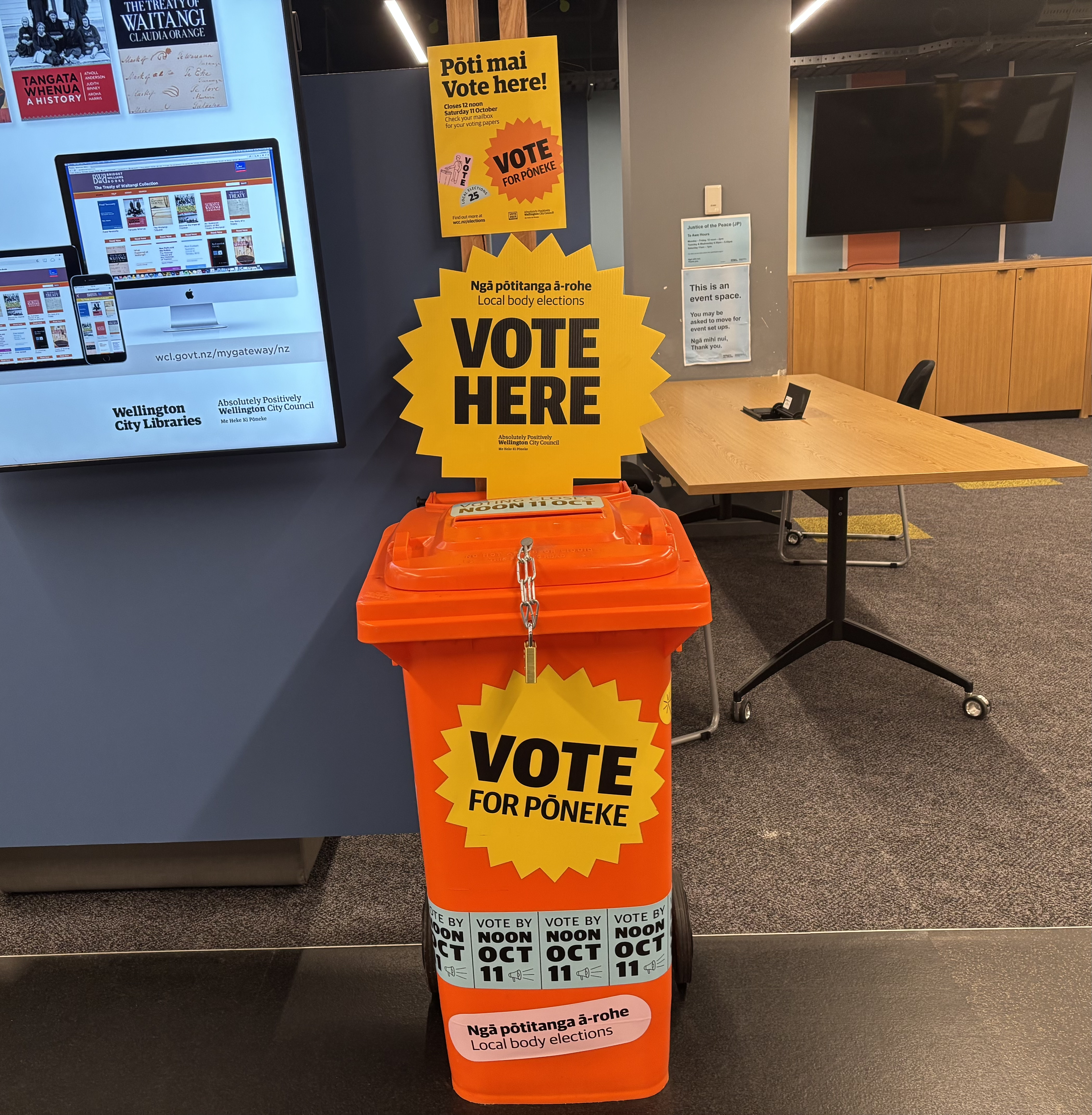
Voting bin used in Wellington

== Campaign ==
=== Mayoral races ===
In Northland, incumbent mayor Moko Tepania faced off against councillor Ann Court for the Far North mayoralty and Whangārei mayor Vince Cocorullo ran against councillor Ken Couper. Craig Jepson, Kaipara mayor and self-described "Trump of the North" did not stand for re-election, instead backing his deputy Jonathan Larsen for the position. Councillor Ash Nayyar and businessman Snow Tane also contested the race.

In Auckland, incumbent centre-right mayor Wayne Brown announced his candidacy for re-election; standing under his group Fix Auckland. Going into the election it seemed his main challenger would be incumbent Whau ward councillor Kerrin Leoni, a member of the Labour Party (though not officially endorsed).

In Hamilton, incumbent centrist mayor Paula Southgate did not run for re-election. Instead, left-leaning councillor Sarah Thomson contested the election against former National MP Tim Macindoe.

Incumbent mayor Tania Tapsell ran again in Rotorua. Rehette Stoltz stood for re-election in Gisborne.

In Hawke's Bay, incumbent mayor Kirsten Wise faced councillor Richard McGrath in the Napier mayoral election. Incumbent Hastings mayor Sandra Hazlehurst retired, with councillors Wendy Schollum and Marcus Buddo, as well as businessman Steve Gibson, in the contest.

Neil Holdom did not seek re-election in New Plymouth. The mayoralty was instead contested by candidates including incumbent deputy mayor David Bublitz and councillors Sam Bennett and Max Brough.

Incumbent mayor Grant Smith again stood for re-election in Palmerston North. Councillor Orphée Mickalad was also a candidate. Andrew Tripe sought re-election in Whanganui, with councillors Peter Oskam and Josh Chandulal-Mackay challenging him.

Labour mayor Campbell Barry did not run for re-election in Lower Hutt. Councillors Karen Morgan and Brady Dyer confirmed they would run, as well as Indian-dance instructor Prabha Ravi. "World-famous-in-Wainuiomata" Ken Laban also ran.

Tory Whanau, the Green endorsed incumbent mayor of Wellington, announced she wouldn't run again in the mayoral election. (Note: See below.) Former leader of the Labour Party, Andrew Little, was seen as the frontrunner; he ran for the mayoralty as the Labour candidate. (Note: See below.) Among the other candidates for the mayoralty were incumbent councillors Ray Chung, running under the Independent Together ticket, and Diane Calvert, former councillor Rob Goulden, former accountant Alex Baker and businessman Karl Tiefenbacher.

In Nelson, former National minister and incumbent mayor Nick Smith stood for re-election. Marlborough mayor Nadine Taylor also stood for re-election.

In Christchurch, centre-right incumbent mayor Phil Mauger sought re-election. He was challenged by "green-tinged" councillor Sara Templeton. Other candidates included perennial candidate Tubby Hansen and white supremacist Philip Arps.

Centre-right incumbent Dunedin mayor Jules Radich sought re-election to the city's mayoralty. He was up against "slightly left-of-centre" businessman Andrew Simms, Green Party candidate Mickey Treadwell, and councillors Sophie Barker, Lee Vandervis, Mandy Mayhem, and Carmen Houlahan.

John Glover and Nik Kiddle were in the running against incumbent Glyn Lewers in Queenstown-Lakes. Tamah Alley also stood for re-election in Central Otago. New Zealand's youngest mayor, Ben Bell, stood for re-election in Gore. Nobby Clark, the controversial incumbent mayor of Invercargill, did not stand for re-election. Councillors Alex Crackett, Ian Pottiger, Tom Campbell (deputy mayor), and Ria Bond (former NZ First MP) were in the running.

=== Central government parties ===
==== ACT New Zealand ====
In mid-March 2025, ACT leader David Seymour announced that the party would be fielding candidates during the 2025 local elections, marking the first time that the party would contest local body elections. ACT candidates would be expected to raise their own funds. Seymour said that the party would focus on lower rates, ending "wasteful spending," and racial equality. The move would be the first time a national-level right wing party had run candidates in local races directly.

The party did not intend to field any Māori ward or mayoral candidates. In a press release published on Scoop, the party said their candidates would oppose attempts to manage emissions by local councils, describing climate action taken by councils as "grandstanding" and "virtue signalling".

The party announced forty-six candidates who would compete in the elections.

==== Alliance Party ====
On 10 June, the Alliance Party announced that librarian and musician Tom Roud would run for a seat on the Christchurch City Council. While the party had been de-registered as a parliamentary eligible party by the Electoral Commission in 2015, party president Victor Billot asserted the party never fully went away.

==== Green Party of Aotearoa New Zealand ====
The Green Party announced they would campaign on a pro-Māori ward position. In a press release on their website, they stressed commitment to sustainability, te tiriti, and community were what Green affiliated and endorsed candidates represented. They said that Green candidates want "bold" and "transformative" action on local issues and issues that affect all areas of the country, like climate change.

The party announced in April that Tory Whanau would run for the Wellington mayoralty as a Green candidate. She had previously been endorsed in 2022 by the party but had officially run as an independent. On 29 April, it was announced Whanau would not run for the mayoralty again. This came after Andrew Little said he would run for Labour, Whanau saying she didn't want the race to be "progressive vs progressive". She instead would run for the city's Māori ward.

Incumbents Laurie Foon and Geordie Rogers, as well as newcomer Jonny Osborne, were announced as Green candidates for wards on the Wellington City Council. Yadana Saw would run again for her position on the Greater Wellington Regional Council. It was announced on 6 May that incumbent Labour councillor Rebecca Matthews would run for the Greens in the Wharangi ward.

High school teacher and photographer Zac Painting was the sole Green candidate for Porirua City Council.

In late May, incumbent Green Otago regional councillor Alan Somerville confirmed he would be seeking a second term as councillor, while video game programmer Mickey Treadwell announced that he would be running as the Greens' mayoral candidate alongside contesting a seat on the Dunedin City Council. Other Green candidates in Dunedin included visual designer Lily Waring and support worker Rose Finnie.

The two incumbent Green councillors on the Palmerston North City Council (Brent Barrett and Kaydee Zabelin) were endorsed by the party for re-election in late May.

Designer Anjana Iyer was the party's candidate for the Whau ward on the Auckland Council. The party also ran candidates for Auckland's local boards: disability activist Jonty Carroll and urban planner Emma McInnes for the Albert-Eden Local Board, Peter Sykes for the Māngere-Ōtāhuhu Local Board, Zooey Neumann for the Henderson-Massey Local Board, and Caitlin Wilson for the Waitematā Local Board.

==== New Zealand Labour Party ====
Labour announced they would campaign on a pro-Māori ward position.

Labour extended nominations for their candidate for mayor of Wellington after being unable to find a candidate. Labour leader Chris Hipkins said he thought the city needed "a really good shake-up", saying the party would potentially endorse an independent candidate. Former Labour leader Andrew Little was approached by the party and announced on 16 April that he would run for the party in Wellington. Though there were still formalities before being officially announced as the party's candidate, Little had received support from Hipkins for the job. Little was announced as the official party candidate on 28 April.

Incumbent Wellington city councillors Ben McNulty and Nureddin Abdurahman ran again for their respective wards (Takapū/Northern and Paekawakawa/Southern); Afnan Al-Rubayee, Matthew Reweti, Sam O'Brien and Joy Gribben were announced as the party's candidates in the other wards. Daran Ponter (incumbent chairman) and Tom James (non-incumbent) ran for seats on the Greater Wellington Regional Council.

In Dunedin, Labour endorsed incumbent councillor Steve Walker and Otago University Students' Association politics representative Jett Groshinski as Dunedin City Council candidates in the 2025 Dunedin City Council election.

Labour endorsed former city councillor Zulfiqar Butt and third-term incumbent city councillor Lorna Johnson for election to the Palmerston North City Council.

=== Local groups ===
Several groups of independent fiscally conservative candidates were formed to contest various council seats. This included Better Hamilton in Hamilton, Better Waipā in Waipā, and Independent Together in Wellington.

=== Hoarding vandalism ===
On 13 September, a hoarding showing ACT Local candidate for Whangārei's Bream Bay ward, Matt Yovich, was pulled down after being damaged by gun bullets. The hoarding had six bullet holes and several bullet casings were found nearby. Yovich reported the shooting to the Police, who launched an investigation.

== List of elections and results ==
=== Regional councils ===
Eleven regions had regional councils separate to the local territorial authorities; regional councils manage issues related to the environment and public transport, among others. 132 regional councillors were elected across all eleven regions.

Council	Electoral system	Seats	Chair	Councillors	Control	Turnout	Details	Refs
Northland	FPP	9	▌ Independent gain	▌ Independent 8 ( 0) ▌ Te Pāti Māori 1 (▲1)	▌ No majority	58,978; 49.30% ▲6.84 pp	Details	
Waikato	FPP	14	▌ Rates Control gain	▌ Rates Control 7 (▲7) ▌ Independent 7 (▼7)	▌ No majority	80,767; 34.73% ▼1.89 pp	Details	
Bay of Plenty	FPP	14	▌ Independent gain	▌ Independent 13 (▲1) ▌ Independent Green 1 ( 0)	▌ No majority	80,767; 34.73% ▼1.89 pp	Details	
Hawke's Bay	FPP	11	▌ Independent gain	▌ Independent 11 ( 0)	▌ No majority	53,561; 49.01% ▲9.85 pp	Details	
Taranaki	FPP	11	▌ Independent hold	▌ Independent 11 ( 0)	▌ No majority	37,759; 47.63% ▲3.08 pp	Details	
Horizons (Manawatū-Whanganui)	FPP	14	▌ Independent gain	▌ Independent 13 ( 0) ▌ Te Pāti Māori 1 (▲1)	▌ No majority	73,713; 46.82% ▲3.35 pp	Details	
Greater Wellington	STV	14	▌ Labour hold	▌ Independent 9 ( 0) ▌ Labour 2 (▲1) ▌ Green 2 (▼1) ▌ ACT Local 1 (▲1)	▌ No majority	161,396; 47.58% ▲4.17 pp	Details	
West Coast	FPP	7	▌ Independent gain	▌ Independent 6 (▼1) ▌ Reform 1 (▲1)	▌ No majority	12,546; 52.37% ▲0.19 pp	Details	
Canterbury	FPP	14	▌ Independent gain	▌ Independent 11 (▼1) ▌ People's Choice 3 (▲1)	▌ No majority	192,854; 41.61% ▼3.76 pp	Details	
Otago	STV	12	▌ Vision Otago gain	▌ Independent 7 (▼4) ▌ Vision Otago 3 (▲3) ▌ Green 1 ( 1) ▌ ACT Local 1 (▲1)	▌ No majority	80,530; 47.10% ▼1.72 pp	Details	
Southland	FPP	12	▌ Independent gain	▌ Independent 12 ( 0)	▌ No majority	20,794; 46.11% ▼5.82 pp	Details	
11 of 11 councils		132						

=== Territorial authorities ===
Twelve city councils and 53 district councils (67 territorial authorities in total) held elections in 2025; territorial authorities manage more local issues such as roads, building consents, water supply and sanitation, among others. Some territorial authorities also manage regional issues and are known as unitary authorities. The Chatham Islands territorial authority has some of the powers of a regional council but not all. Candidates were also elected to 21 local and 111 community boards and 14 licensing trusts.

Tauranga did not hold elections due to having already held elections in 2024.

==== Overall ====
Council	Electoral system	Seats	Mayor	Councillors	Control	Turnout	Details	Refs
Far North	STV	10	▌ Independent hold	▌ Independent 8 (▼2) ▌ YVOC 1 (▲1) ▌ ACT Local 1 (▲1)	▌ No majority	24,556; 50.68% ▲9.15 pp	Details	
Whangārei	STV	13	▌ Independent gain	▌ Independent 12 ( 0) ▌ ACT Local 1 (▲1)	▌ No majority	30,490; 45.50% ▲2.23 pp	Details	
Kaipara	FPP	8	▌ Independent gain	▌ Independent 8 ( 0)	▌ No majority	10,702; 58.39% ▲10.83 pp	Details	
Auckland	FPP	20	▌ Fix Auckland gain	▌ Independent 6 (▼3) ▌ Labour 5 ( 0) ▌ Fix Auckland 2 (▲2) ▌ MPAT 2 (▲1) ▌ City Vision 1 ( 0) ▌ PPF 1 (▼1) ▌ C&R 1 ( 0) ▌ WestWards 1 ( 0) ▌ Team Franklin 1 ( 0)	▌ No majority	350,153; 29.04% ▼6.37 pp	Details	
Thames-Coromandel	FPP	10	▌ Independent gain	▌ Independent 10 (▲1)	▌ No majority	12,272; 48.11% ▼3.34 pp	Details	
Hauraki	FPP	13	▌ Independent hold	▌ Independent 13 ( 0)	▌ No majority	6,120; 40.24% ▼0.32 pp	Details	
Waikato	FPP	13	▌ Independent gain	▌ Independent 13 ( 0)	▌ No majority	20,360; 35.03% ▲2.72 pp	Details	
Matamata-Piako	FPP	12	▌ Independent gain	▌ Independent 12 ( 0)	▌ No majority	11,570; 45.85% ▲4.44 pp	Details	
Hamilton	STV	14	▌ Independent gain	▌ Independent 10 (▼2) ▌ Better Hamilton 4 (▲4)	▌ No majority	38,063; 32.97% ▲3.81 pp	Details	
Waipā	FPP	11	▌ Independent gain	▌ Independent 10 (▼1) ▌ Better Waipa 1 (▲1)	▌ No majority	17,411; 42.27% ▼1.89 pp	Details	
Ōtorohanga	FPP	9	▌ Independent gain	▌ Independent 9 ( 0)	▌ No majority	3,168; 49.90% ▲4.74 pp	Details	
South Waikato	FPP	10	▌ Independent hold	▌ Independent 10 ( 0)	▌ No majority	7,596; 46.05% ▲2.89 pp	Details	
Waitomo	FPP	6	▌ Independent hold	▌ Independent 6 ( 0)	▌ No majority	2,761; 46.15% ▲2.13 pp	Details	
Taupō	FPP	12	▌ Independent gain	▌ Independent 11 (▼1) ▌ Let's Go Taupō 1 (▲1)	▌ No majority	15,866; 56.13% ▲8.86 pp	Details	
Western Bay of Plenty	FPP	9	▌ Independent hold	▌ Independent 9 ( 0)	▌ No majority	15,299; 38.20% ▲0.55 pp	Details	
Rotorua	FPP	10	▌ Independent hold	▌ Independent 9 ( 0) ▌ Te Pāti Māori 1 (▲1)	▌ No majority	21,795; 43.52% ▼4.41 pp	Details	
Whakatāne	FPP	10	▌ Independent Green gain	▌ Independent 10 ( 0)	▌ No majority	12,824; 49.20% ▲3.95 pp	Details	
Kawerau	FPP	8	▌ Independent hold	▌ Independent 8 ( 0)	▌ No majority	2,345; 45.31% ▲3.16 pp	Details	
Kawerau	FPP	7	▌ Independent hold	▌ Independent 7 ( 0)	▌ No majority	3,063; 46.81% ▼7.09 pp	Details	
Gisborne	STV	13	▌ Independent hold	▌ Independent 13 ( 0)	▌ No majority	16,377; 48.07% ▲4.66 pp	Details	
Wairoa	FPP	6	▌ Independent hold	▌ Independent 6 ( 0)	▌ No majority	3,192; 56.05% ▲4.57 pp	Details	
Hastings	FPP	15	▌ Independent gain	▌ Independent 13 (▼1) ▌ Independent Green 1 (▲1) ▌ CARE for Hastings 1 (▲1)	▌ No majority	26,759; 45.84% ▲12.12 pp	Details	
Napier	FPP	11	▌ Independent gain	▌ Independent 11 (▲1)	▌ No majority	21,325; 46.08% ▲5.94 pp	Details	
Central Hawke's Bay	FPP	9	▌ Independent gain	▌ Independent 9 ( 0)	▌ No majority	6,134; 56.39% ▲12.08 pp	Details	
New Plymouth	STV	14	▌ Independent gain	▌ Independent 13 (▼1) ▌ ACT Local 1 (▲1)	▌ No majority	28,625; 46.46% ▲1.44 pp	Details	
Stratford	FPP	11	▌ Independent hold	▌ Independent 11 ( 0)	▌ No majority	3,684; 53.74% ▲10.75 pp	Details	
South Taranaki	FPP	13	▌ Independent gain	▌ Independent 13 (▲1)	▌ No majority	8,438; 45.13% ▲5.80 pp	Details	
Ruapehu	STV	9	▌ Independent hold	▌ Independent 9 ( 0)	▌ No majority	4,302; 51.56% ▲0.67 pp	Details	
Whanganui	FPP	12	▌ Independent hold	▌ Independent 12 ( 0)	▌ No majority	17,024; 50.81% ▲3.34 pp	Details	
Rangitīkei	FPP	11	▌ Independent hold	▌ Independent 11 ( 0)	▌ No majority	5,451; 49.85% ▲3.07 pp	Details	
Manawatū	FPP	11	▌ Independent gain	▌ Independent 8 (▼2) ▌ Independent Green 1 (▲1) ▌ ACT Local 1 (▲1) ▌ Te Kōtui Reo 1 (▲1)	▌ No majority	9,171; 40.29% ▼4.72 pp	Details	
Palmerston North	STV	15	▌ Independent hold	▌ Independent 11 (▲1) ▌ Green 2 ( 0) ▌ Labour 1 ( 0) ▌ Te Pāti Māori 1 (▲1)	▌ No majority	25,060; 42.13% ▲5.40 pp	Details	
Tararua	FPP	9	▌ Independent gain	▌ Independent 9 ( 0)	▌ No majority	7,119; 55.47% ▲6.25 pp	Details	
Horowhenua	FPP	12	▌ Independent hold	▌ Independent 12 ( 0)	▌ No majority	12,214; 47.44% ▲1.30 pp	Details	
Kāpiti Coast	STV	10	▌ Independent hold	▌ Independent 9 (▼1) ▌ Te Pāti Māori 1 (▲1)	▌ No majority	20,481; 46.91% ▲1.14 pp	Details	
Porirua	STV	10	▌ Independent hold	▌ Independent 8 ( 0) ▌ Labour 2 ( 0)	▌ No majority	17,623; 40.95% ▲3.61 pp	Details	
Upper Hutt	FPP	10	▌ Independent gain	▌ Independent 10 ( 0)	▌ No majority	16,728; 50.54% ▲6.59 pp	Details	
Lower Hutt	FPP	13	▌ Independent gain	▌ Independent 11 (▲3)	▌ No majority	33,037; 41.81% ▲0.81 pp	Details	
Wellington	STV	15	▌ Labour gain	▌ Independent 5 (▼3) ▌ Labour 5 (▲1) ▌ Green 4 (▲1) ▌ Independent Together 1 (▲1)	▌ No majority	81,574; 50.57% ▲5.03 pp	Details	
Masterton	FPP	8	▌ Independent gain	▌ Independent 8 ( 0)	▌ No majority	9,564; 47.56% ▼0.20 pp	Details	
Carterton	FPP	8	▌ Independent gain	▌ Independent 8 ( 0)	▌ No majority	4,159; 53.89% ▼6.78 pp	Details	
South Wairarapa	FPP	10	▌ Independent gain	▌ Independent 10 (▲1)	▌ No majority	5,597; 59.89% ▲4.43 pp	Details	
Tasman	FPP	14	▌ Independent hold	▌ Independent 12 (▼1) ▌ SAE 2 (▲2)	▌ No majority	20,183; 47.75% ▼2.29 pp	Details	
Nelson	STV	12	▌ Independent hold	▌ Independent 11 (▲2) ▌ Labour 1 (▲1)	▌ No majority	18,789; 48.59% ▼4.62 pp	Details	
Marlborough	STV	14	▌ Independent hold	▌ Independent 12 (▼2) ▌ ACT Local 2 (▲2)	▌ No majority	15,333; 44.05% ▼0.08 pp	Details	
Buller	FPP	10	▌ Independent gain	▌ Independent 10 ( 0)	▌ No majority	4,199; 55.05% ▲5.82 pp	Details	
Grey	FPP	8	▌ Independent hold	▌ Independent 8 ( 0)	▌ No majority	4,683; 47.37% ▼1.97 pp	Details	
Westland	FPP	8	▌ Independent hold	▌ Independent 8 ( 0)	▌ No majority	3,677; 56.87% ▼3.55 pp	Details	
Kaikōura	FPP	7	▌ Independent hold	▌ Independent 7 ( 0)	▌ No majority	1,881; 61.43% ▼2.87 pp	Details	
Hurunui	FPP	10	▌ Independent hold	▌ Independent 10 ( 0)	▌ No majority	3,337; 34.45% ▼14.96 pp	Details	
Waimakariri	FPP	10	▌ Independent hold	▌ Independent 9 (▼1) ▌ Standing Together 1 (▲1)	▌ No majority	9,540; 48.39% ▼0.06 pp	Details	
Christchurch	FPP	16	▌ Independent hold	▌ Independent 7 (▼1) ▌ PC / Labour 7 (▲1) (Note: ▌ People's Choice 4 (▲1) ▌ People's Choice / Labour 2 ( 0) ▌ Labour 1 ( 0)) ▌ Independent Citizens 2 ( 0)	▌ No majority	107,475; 38.30% ▼6.06 pp	Details	
Selwyn	FPP	10	▌ Independent gain	▌ Independent 10 ( 0)	▌ No majority	26,440; 48.32% ▲5.18 pp	Details	
Ashburton	FPP	9	▌ Independent gain	▌ Independent 9 ( 0)	▌ No majority	10,658; 46.39% ▼4.72 pp	Details	
Timaru	FPP	9	▌ Independent hold	▌ Independent 9 ( 0)	▌ No majority	16,259; 48.39% ▼1.21 pp	Details	
Mackenzie	FPP	7	▌ Independent gain	▌ Independent 7 ( 0)	▌ No majority	2,130; 61.35% ▲5.46 pp	Details	
Waimate	FPP	8	▌ Independent hold	▌ Independent 8 ( 0)	▌ No majority	2,954; 53.52% ▼0.87 pp	Details	
Waitaki	FPP	10	▌ Independent gain	▌ Independent 10 ( 0)	▌ No majority	28,593; 52.52% ▲2.35 pp	Details	
Central Otago	FPP	10	▌ Independent hold	▌ Independent 10 (▼1)	▌ No majority	9,939; 55.47% ▲7.35 pp	Details	
Queenstown Lakes	FPP	11	▌ Independent gain	▌ Independent 11 ( 0)	▌ No majority	12,927; 41.54% ▼2.93 pp	Details	
Dunedin	STV	14	▌ Independent gain	▌ Independent 10 ( 0) ▌ Future Dunedin 1 (▲1) ▌ Building Kotahitaka 1 (▲1) ▌ Labour 1 (▲1) ▌ Green 1 (▲1)	▌ No majority	43,300; 45.72% ▼4.18 pp	Details	
Clutha	FPP	9	▌ Independent gain	▌ Independent 9 (▼3)	▌ No majority	6,614; 53.45% ▲0.35 pp	Details	
Southland	FPP	12	▌ Independent hold	▌ Independent 12 ( 0)	▌ No majority	8,744; 42.36% ▼5.79 pp	Details	
Gore	FPP	11	▌ Independent gain	▌ Independent 11 (▲2)	▌ No majority	4,991; 55.16% ▲1.79 pp	Details	
Invercargill	FPP	12	▌ Independent gain	▌ Independent 12 (▲4)	▌ No majority	17,996; 46.35% ▼6.84 pp	Details	
Chatham Islands	FPP	8	▌ Independent gain	▌ Independent 8 ( 0)	▌ No majority	316; 71.18% ▲17.95 pp	Details	
66 of 67 councils		709						

==== Mayors ====
All territorial authorities (including unitary authorities) directly elect mayors.

Council	Incumbent	Elected	Runner-up	Details	Refs
Far North	Moko Tepania (Ind)		Ann Court (YVOC)	Details	
Whangārei	Vince Cocurullo (Ind)	Ken Couper (Ind)	Vince Cocurullo (Ind)	Details	
Kaipara	Craig Jepson^{R} (Ind)	Jonathan Larsen (Ind)	Snow Tane (Ind)	Details	
Auckland	Wayne Brown (Fix Auckland)		Kerrin Leoni (Ind)	Details	
Thames-Coromandel	Len Salt (Ind)	Peter Revell (Ind)	Patrick Kerr (Ind)	Details	
Hauraki	Toby Adams (Ind)		Roman Jackson (Ind)	Details	
Waikato	Jacqui Church (Ind)	Aksel Bech (Ind)	Jacqui Church (Ind)	Details	
Matamata-Piako	Adrienne Wilcock (Ind)	Ash Tanner (Ind)	Adrienne Wilcock (Ind)	Details	
Hamilton	Paula Southgate^{R} (Ind)	Tim Macindoe (Ind)	Sarah Thomson (Ind)	Details	
Waipā	Susan O'Regan (Ind)	Mike Pettit (Ind)	Susan O'Regan (Ind)	Details	
Ōtorohanga	Max Baxter^{R} (Ind)	Rodney Dow (Ind)	Cathy Prendergast (Ind)	Details	
South Waikato	Gary Petley (Ind)		Zed Latinovic (Ind)	Details	
Waitomo	John Robertson (Ind)		Janette Osborne (Ind)	Details	
Taupō	David Trewavas (Ind)	John Funnell (Ind)	Zane Cozens (Ind)	Details	
Western Bay of Plenty	James Denyer (Ind)		Margaret Murray-Benge (Ind)	Details	
Rotorua	Tania Tapsell (Ind)		Don Paterson (Ind)	Details	
Whakatāne	Victor Luca (Ind)	Nándor Tánczos (Ind Green)	Victor Luca (Ind)	Details	
Kawerau	Faylene Tunui (Ind)		Carolyn Ion (Ind)	Details	
Ōpōtiki	David Moore (Ind)		Curley Keno (Ind)	Details	
Gisborne	Rehette Stolz (Ind)		Colin Alder (Ind)	Details	
Wairoa	Craig Little (Ind)		Denise Eaglesome-Karekare (Ind)	Details	
Hastings	Sandra Hazlehurst^{R} (Ind)	Wendy Schollum (Ind)	Marcus Buddo (Ind)	Details	
Napier	Kirsten Wise (Ind)	Richard McGrath (Ind)	Kirsten Wise (Ind)	Details	
Central Hawke's Bay	Alex Walker (Ind)	Will Foley (Ind)	Alex Walker (Ind)	Details	
New Plymouth	Neil Holdom^{R} (Ind)	Max Brough (Ind)	David Bublitz (Ind)	Details	
Stratford	Neil Volzke (Ind)		Jono Erwood (Ind)	Details	
South Taranaki	Phil Nixon (Ind)		Clem Coxhead (Ind)	Details	
Ruapehu	Weston Kirton (Ind)		Grant Lethborg (Ind)	Details	
Whanganui	Andrew Tripe (Ind)		Josh Chandulal-Mackay (Ind)	Details	
Rangitīkei	Andy Watson (Ind)		Simon Loudon (Ind)	Details	
Manawatū	Helen Worboys^{R} (Ind)	Michael Ford (Ind)	unopposed	Details	
Palmerston North	Grant Smith (Ind)		Orphée Mickalad (Ind)	Details	
Tararua	Tracey Collis (Ind)	Scott Gilmore (Ind)	Tracey Collis (Ind)	Details	
Horowhenua	Bernie Wanden (Ind)		Justin Tamihana (Ind)	Details	
Kāpiti Coast	Janet Holborow (Ind)		Rob McCann (Ind)	Details	
Porirua	Anita Baker (Ind)		Kathleen Filo (Ind)	Details	
Upper Hutt	Wayne Guppy (Ind)	Peri Zee (Ind)	Wayne Guppy (Ind)	Details	
Lower Hutt	Campbell Barry^{R} (Labour)	Ken Laban (Ind)	Brady Dyer (Ind)	Details	
Wellington	Tory Whanau^{R} (Ind Green)	Andrew Little (Labour)	Karl Tiefenbacher (Ind)	Details	
Masterton	Gary Caffell^{R} (Ind)	Bex Johnson (Ind)	Stella Lennox (Ind)	Details	
Carterton	Ron Mark^{R} (Ind)	Steve Cretney (Ind)	Brian Deller (Ind)	Details	
South Wairarapa	Martin Connelly^{R} (Ind)	Fran Wilde (Ind)	Leah Hawkins (Ind)	Details	
Tasman	Tim King (Ind)		Timo Neubauer (Ind)	Details	
Nelson	Nick Smith (Ind)		Aaron Stallard (Ind)	Details	
Marlborough	Nadine Taylor (Ind)		Shaun Brown (MFP)	Details	
Buller	Jamie Cleine (Ind)	Chris Russell (Ind)	Jamie Cleine (Ind)	Details	
Grey	Tania Gibson (Ind)		Richard Osmaston (MFP)	Details	
Westland	Helen Lash (Ind)		Jacquie Grant (Ind)	Details	
Kaikōura	Craig Mackle (Ind)		John Diver (Ind)	Details	
Hurunui	Marie Black (Ind)		unopposed	Details	
Waimakariri	Dan Gordon (Ind)		Paul Williams (STFW)	Details	
Christchurch	Phil Mauger (Ind)		Sara Templeton (Ind)	Details	
Selwyn	Sam Broughton (Ind)	Lydia Gliddon (Ind)	Sam Broughton (Ind)	Details	
Ashburton	Neil Brown^{R} (Ind)	Liz McMillan (Ind)	Russell Ellis (Ind)	Details	
Timaru	Nigel Bowen (Ind)		Stu Piddington (Ind)	Details	
Mackenzie	Anne Munro^{R} (Ind)	Scott Aronsen (Ind)	Karen Morgan (Ind)	Details	
Waimate	Craig Rowley (Ind)		Sharyn Cain (Ind)	Details	
Waitaki	Gary Kircher^{R} (Ind)	Melanie Tavendale (Ind)	David Wilson (Ind)	Details	
Central Otago	Tamah Alley (Ind)		Charlie Sanders (Ind)	Details	
Queenstown Lakes	Glyn Lewers (Ind)	John Glover (Ind)	Glyn Lewers (Ind)	Details	
Dunedin	Jules Radich (TD)	Sophie Barker (Ind)	Andrew Simms (FD)	Details	
Clutha	Bryan Cadogan^{R} (Ind)	Jock Martin (Ind)	Ken Payne (Ind)	Details	
Southland	Rob Scott (Ind)		Gary Tong (Ind)	Details	
Gore	Ben Bell (Ind)		Nicky Davis (Ind)	Details	
Invercargill	Nobby Clark^{R} (LGI)	Tom Campbell (Ind)	Alex Crackett (Ind)	Details	
Chatham Islands	Monique Croon (Ind)	Greg Horler (Ind)	Monique Croon (Ind)	Details	
^{R} did not run for re-election

=== Referendums ===
Alongside these elections, 42 councils held referendums on the question of whether to retain dedicated Māori wards and constituencies.

Porirua City Council and Hutt City Council also held indicative referendums on the question of whether they should explore the possibility of amalgamation with each other and the Wellington, Upper Hutt and Greater Wellington councils.

Council	Subject	Option	Councils	Vote	%	Details	Refs
Binding
42 councils (Note: See list here.)	Māori wards	Keep	18	542,134	50.25	Details	
42 councils	Māori wards	Remove	24	467,923	43.37	Details	
Indicative
Lower Hutt	Amalgamation	Yes		17,429	54.96	Details	
Lower Hutt	Amalgamation	No		14,283	45.04	Details	
Porirua	Amalgamation	Yes		9,581	56.43	Details	
Porirua	Amalgamation	No		7,399	43.57	Details	
All 44 referendums

== Aftermath ==
=== By-elections ===
A by-election was triggered in the Vincent ward of the Central Otago District following the resignation of councillor-elect Dave McKenzie on 15 October. McKenzie was investigated by the Central Otago District Council for alleged financial misconduct while working as a contractor. These allegations included overcharging the Council by NZ$1,000 in an invoice.

A by-election in Dunedin was triggered by the death of Dunedin City Councillor and former Mayor of Dunedin Jules Radich in January 2026. The by-election was held on 12 May 2026.

=== Electoral irregularities ===
==== Kaipara ====
On 16 October 2025, the outgoing Mayor of Kaipara Craig Jepson called an emergency meeting prior to the expected release of the 2025 Kaipara District Council election on 17 October. He said that the purpose of the emergency meeting was to approve a complaint and request an investigation into alleged improprieties that occurred during the 2025 Kaipara District Council election and 2025 Northland Regional Council Māori constituency referendum. Following a tense public meeting, the Kaipara District Council voted by a margin of 5 to 3 votes to endorse Jepson's complaint alleging irregularities in the election process. On 20 October, the Department of Internal Affairs's local government general manager Richard Ward confirmed the department had received Jepson's complaint but clarified that it did not have the jurisdiction to investigate the complaint and was unable to halt the release of local election results in Kaipara. The department stated that local body elections were the responsibility of the local electoral officer: the Auckland-based company Election Services's managing direct Dale Ofsoske. Ofsoske defended the integrity of Kaipara's elections. Kaipara District Council chief executive Jason Marris said that several "small issues" had been addressed while one issue had been referred to the Police.

On 3 November 2025, Radio New Zealand reported that 288 (62%) of the 468 special votes cast during the Kaipara District Council election had been excluded for various reasons including voters not being on the electoral roll, outdated enrolment details, and incomplete declaration forms. Nine votes were also excluded because individuals had tried to vote twice, once using their original voting papers and a second time using the special voting form. Defeated mayoral candidate Snow Tane argued that the high number of rejected special votes suggested that special voters had been improperly guided through the special voting process, which he described as a "systematic failure." In October, Tane had unsuccessfully applied for a recount of Kaipara mayoral election votes due to his close margin with mayor-elect Jonathan Larsen. Justice Kevin Kelly had declined Tane's application on the grounds that he had not provided sufficient evidence of voting irregularities. Fellow Kaipara mayoral candidate Ash Nayyar had also unsuccessfully applied for a recount on the grounds that a high proportion of special votes had been excluded in the Wairoa ward.

==== Onehunga ====
On 11 October, Communities & Residents candidate Debbie Burrows attempted to interfere with special voting at a polling booth in Onehunga by taking photographs. Electoral officer Dale Ofsoske confirmed that he had received several complaints describing Burrows' behaviour as a violation of Local Electoral Act provisions prohibiting people from influencing or interfering with voting on election day. Ofsoske submitted these reports to Police, who launched an investigation into Burrows' actions. In response, Burrows denied she had committed any wrongdoing and stated that she did not know that special voting was allowed to occur after postal booths closed at midday on election day.

==== Papatoetoe ====
In late October 2025, The Spinoff reported that Police were investigating alleged election fraud after all four members of the new Papatoetoe-Otara Action Team were elected onto the Ōtara-Papatoetoe Local Board's Papatoetoe division by a landslide over their opponents, with margins of 1,000 plus. Their opponents alleged that voting papers were stolen from peoples' letter boxes and that voters were still recorded as having voted despite never receiving their voting papers. Police also received complaints that people had allegedly been instructed how to vote inside polling booths and a Sikh gurdwara. The Papatoetoe-Otara Action Team's campaign manager Rajesh Goya has denied allegations of voter fraud and attributed the ticket's electoral victory to vigorous campaigning and an influx of Indians and Indo-Fijians to Papatoetoe. By 10 December 2025, Justice Richard McIlraith had identified 79 irregular votes including 53 wrongfully-cast votes. Labour candidate Vi Hausia, who came fifth in the community board race, has sought to compile evidence of electoral fraud in order to force a by-election. On 16 December, McIlraith ruled that electoral irregularities materially affected the result of the Papatoetoe subdivision of the local board election and voided the results, ordering a by-election.

==== Manurewa ====
In August 2026, The New Zealand Herald reported that a whistleblower had made allegations of electoral fraud for the elections to the Manurewa local board during the 2025 elections to Auckland Council. The council passed the allegations onto the police and the Serious Fraud Office, and appointed an independent governance observer to the Manurewa local board.

=== Alleged harassment ===
In late October 2025, Manurewa Local Board member Joseph Allan laid a code-of-conduct complaint against a man whom he accused of creating fake Facebook accounts to harass him and his allies, while praising a rival candidate.

=== Vote recount ===
On 11 November, the Porirua District Court ordered a vote recount in the Porirua City Council's Māori ward, which incumbent councillor Kylie Wihapi had won by a narrow 11 vote margin. The defeated challenger Jess Te Huai had applied for a recount at the Porirua District Court on 21 October. Due to the contested result, the Porirua City Council had been unable to hold its inaugural meeting until final rulings on the recount. Porirua had voted to retain its Māori ward during the 2025 referendum held alongside the local elections.

== See also ==
- Local elections in New Zealand
