= Animal Justice Party Aotearoa New Zealand =

- Founded: November 2022
- Registered: Yes
- Preceded by: Animal Justice Auckland
- Headquarters: 27F Whatawhata Road, Dinsdale, Hamilton
- Membership (2025): 800
- Ideology: Animal welfare

Website
- animaljustice.org.nz

The Animal Justice Party Aotearoa New Zealand (AJP) is a registered political party in New Zealand. The party advocates non-violence towards animals, sustainability, and a move away from animal-based agriculture.

== History ==
The AJP was founded after discussions with the Animal Justice Party in Australia, who also gave permission to use the name. The original policies of the AJP were closely aligned with the Australian party, but have since been extensively revised and expanded to reflect New Zealand, and coverage of animal, planet and people issues. The AJP was registered as an Incorporated Society on 11 November 2022.

In February 2023, the party announced they had reached 1000 followers on Facebook and 220 party members. In May 2023, the party was granted $66,332 in broadcasting funding for the 2023 New Zealand general election, provisional upon registration. The party applied for registration with the Electoral Commission on 31 July 2023. It was registered on 16 August 2023.

The party ran 17 candidates in the 2023 New Zealand general election. Two polls conducted for 1News in September 2023 indicated that support for the Animal Justice Party was around 0.3 to 0.4 percent. The party ultimately received 0.17% of the party vote, earning no seats.

The party ran a candidate in the 2023 Port Waikato by-election, coming fourth.

In an August 2025 1News Verian national poll, the AJP registered at 1% support for the first time.

In the 2025 local elections, the party unsuccessfully stood candidates for mayor in Auckland and in Hamilton, and for seats on the Whanganui District Council and the Bay of Plenty Regional Council.

In the 2026 general election, the party ran ten list candidates, nine of which contested electorates. Based on preliminary results, the Animal Justice Party won 0.1% of the vote, earning no seats.

== Policies and ideology ==
=== Animals ===
The AJP says they believe that all animals, regardless of form, deserve the right to live and thrive. They say that animals currently face cruel, inadequate and exploitative conditions that prioritise human interests over their inherent rights and well-being. They advocate for systemic change, regulatory reforms and safeguards that prioritise the rights and value of non human life.

They would:

- Ban recreational fishing and fishing competitions
- Ban the use of all animals for entertainment, while supporting the people in the industry to find new jobs
- Support the ban on greyhound racing
- Ban all forms of horse racing
- Ban rodeo
- Ban recreational hunting and hunting competitions
- Create compassionate and sick leave for companion animal death and sickness
- Support pets on public transport
- End the commercial breeding of companion animals
- End intensive winter grazing
- Conduct a full and independent review is undertaken of the treatment of calves viewed through the lens of the calf and that review be publicly shared
- Ban the production of fur and leather
- Ban animal experimentation
- Oppose the use of 1080
- Appoint a commissioner for animals with legal jurisdiction over animal well-being, enabling monitoring of all sectors

=== Environment and economy ===
The AJP wants to switch to a plant-based economy that respects sentient animals. It states that climate change is one of the most urgent challenges we face, and that it is caused by greenhouse gas emissions from burning fossil fuels, the destruction of natural ecosystems and intensive animal farming. It calls for urgent action on climate change and a phased switch to plant based diets.

They would:

- Reduce greenhouse gas emissions by transitioning to a plant-based economy, supporting farmers to grow produce instead of farming animals
- Support policies that reduce emissions, avoid unnecessary animal suffering, improve human and non-human animal health, and restore and expand our waterways, forests and wildlife
- Advocate for a paradigm shift in agriculture towards efficient and productive land use without farming animals
- Support compassionate conservation measures, habitat restoration, and the implementation of policies to mitigate the impact of pollutants and pesticides
- Embrace the concept of Kaitiakitanga, recognising our responsibility as guardians of the land
- Promote the adoption of circular economy principles, community-led initiatives, and local resilience measures to minimise negative impact on the ecological footprint
- Envision a society that measures success, not only by economic metrics, but also by the health of ecosystems, the well being of communities, and the ethical and moral treatment of non-human animals
- Banning factory farming
- Enact tougher laws, regulations and enforcement mechanisms regarding animal farming
- Support farm livelihood transitions
- Support innovation in food tech
- Aims to eliminate food waste and environmental pollution while reducing energy and material use
- Support recycling
- Make changes to commercial fishing to reduce plastic pollution and by-catch
- Encourage reuse, recycling and composting programs in businesses and public institutions
- Stop the dumping of edible food by retailers and to ensure these products are sent to people in need
- Prioritise rewilding of farmland and expansion of wetlands
- Require councils to protect significant trees and will ensure that there are wildlife corridors in urban areas

=== People ===
The AJP seeks to create a society where the welfare, and ability to thrive, of both humans and other animals is at the forefront, guided by compassion, inclusivity, just governance, and a commitment to sustainability.

They would:

- Embrace the Treaty of Waitangi and acknowledge its importance in guiding a compassionate, just and equitable relationship with animals
- Reflect the essence of Te Tiriti o Waitangi, promoting harmony and respect for all beings within the nation’s diverse tapestry
- Promote and incentivise more compassionate and healthy dietary choices
- Teach children about the importance of biodiversity
- Support the protection efforts of tangata whenua towards the use and care of natural resources

== Advocacy ==
In addition to being a political party, the AJP also acts as somewhat of an advocacy group, hosting petitions for or against government actions.

=== Mud farming ===
Mud farming, also known as intensive winter grazing, is a practice where animals are confined over winter to outdoor feeding areas planted with annual forage crops. AJPANZ claims that it causes immense harm to animals and our environment and created a template to send a submissions to government ministers and the Southland mayor, urging them to thoroughly investigate farms to ensure they aren't mud farming and to establish a Minister for Animals to enforce animal welfare laws.

=== Live export ===
Live exporting is the practice of shipping living livestock overseas by sea. It has been illegal in New Zealand since April of 2023, the current coalition government has promised to overturn that ban. AJPANZ has a petition urging the government to keep the ban and it also hopes to convince individual ports, local councils and the global community to take policy positions against live export.

== Election results and support ==
=== National ===
Election	# of candidates nominated		# of seats won	# of party votes	% of party vote
Election	Electorate	List	# of seats won	# of party votes	% of party vote
2023	17	17	0	5,018	0.18
2026	9	10	0	TBD	TBD

=== Local ===
Election	# of candidates				Winning candidates			
Election	Mayor	Council	Community board	Regional council	Mayor	Council	Community board	Regional council
2025	2	1	–	1	0 / 2	0 / 1	–	0 / 1

== List of leaders ==
No.	Name	Assumed office	Left office	No.	Name	Assumed office	Left office
1	Rob McNeil	November 2022		1?	Anna Rippon	?	c. December 2023 (Note: It is presumed Rippon left the party sometime in December 2023, with her role as policy president being replaced by Karen Singleton, sometime after 10 December 2023. Rippon was taken off the "Our People" section of the website, and has not publicly appeared with the party since.)
1	Rob McNeil	November 2022		2?	Danette Wereta	?	

== See also ==
- Animal Justice Party (Australian political party)
- Animal welfare in New Zealand
- Animal rights movement
