= 2025 Whanganui District Council election =

Elections in New Zealand

- 11 October 2025
- Turnout: 17,024 (50.81% ▲3.34 pp)
- Mayor
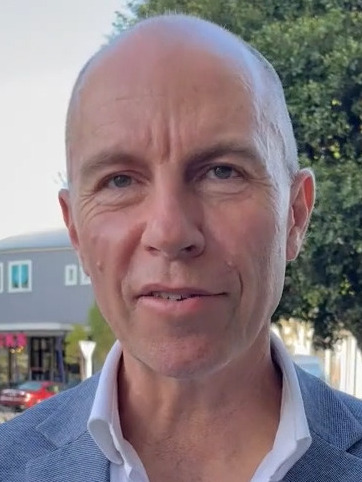
		Ind	Ind
Candidate	Andrew Tripe	Josh Chandulal-Mackay	Peter Oskam
Party	Independent	Independent	Independent
Popular vote	9,147	5,286	1,895
Percentage	53.73%	31.05%	11.13%
Mayor before election
Andrew Tripe
Independent
Elected mayor
Andrew Tripe
Independent
- Councillors
- 12 seats on the governing body of Whanganui District Council; 7 seats needed for a majority
Party	Seats	+/–
Independent	12	0
This lists parties that won seats. See the complete results below.

The 2025 Whanganui District Council election was a local election held from 9 September to 11 October in the Whanganui District of New Zealand, as part of that year's territorial authority elections and other local elections held nation-wide.

Voters elected the mayor of Whanganui, 12 district councillors, and other local representatives for the 2025–2028 term of the Whanganui District Council. Postal voting and the first-past-the-post voting system were used.

The council voted to introduce a Māori ward at this election; its future was decided in a referendum on the issue, as part of a nation-wide series of referendums.

Incumbent mayor Andrew Tripe was re-elected to a second term.

== Key dates ==
- 4 July 2025: Nominations for candidates opened
- 1 August 2025: Nominations for candidates closed at 12 pm
- 9 September 2025: Voting documents were posted and voting opened
- 11 October 2025: Voting closed at 12 pm and progress/preliminary results published
- 16–19 October 2025: Final results declared.

== Background ==
=== Positions up for election ===
Voters in the district elected the mayor of Whanganui, 12 councillors in 2 wards, and the members of the Rural Community Board. (Note: 2 members in the Whanganui subdivision.; 2 members in the Kaitoke subdivision.; 2 members in the Kai Iwi subdivision.) They also elected members of the Horizons Regional Council. (Note: 2 members from the district in the Whanganui constituency.; 1 member partially from the district in the Raki Māori constituency.)

== Campaign ==
=== Mayor ===
In early October, incumbent mayor Andrew Tripe drew controversy when he attended a candlelit vigil for American conservative activist Charlie Kirk, following said activist's assassination. Tripe said he regretted his comments at the vigil, saying he "naïvely" went to the event after being invited and that he did not know that Kirk was a divisive figure. He was quoted as saying that "Charlie Kirk shed his blood for us" and that "it is our call to act on what Charlie Kirk was doing, boldly."

== List of candidates ==
=== Incumbents not seeking re-election ===
- Charlie Anderson, councillor since 2013
- Helen Craig, deputy mayor and councillor since 2013.
- Jenny Duncan, councillor since 2013

=== Mayor ===
Candidate	Photo	Affiliation (Note: A candidate may leave their affiliation blank, run as an independent, or run with an affiliation to an organisation, local body ticket or political party. Whanganui District Council does not allow whānau, hapū, or iwi details to be used for the affiliation.)	Notes
Josh Chandulal-Mackay		A New Generation of Leadership	Councillor since 2016. Also ran for re-election as a councillor in the general ward.
Gregory McPhee		None	Also ran to be a councillor in the general ward
Peter Oskam		Community before Coin	Councillor since 2022. Also ran for re-election as a councillor in the general ward.
Andrew Tripe		Let's keep Whanganui moving forward	Mayor since 2022

=== Councillors ===
==== Whanganui Māori ward ====
Whanganui Māori ward returned two councillors to the district council.

Candidate	Affiliation	Notes
Kiritahi Firmin	Independent	
Julie Herewini	None	
Geoff Hipango	None	
Hayden Potaka	Independent	
Phil T Reweti (Bear)	None	

==== Whanganui General ward ====
Whanganui General ward returned ten councillors to the district council.

Candidate	Affiliation	Notes
Philippa Baker-Hogan	Ratepayer & Sport focused	Incumbent councillor
Jason Bardell	Back to Basics	
Glenda Brown	Independent	Councillor since 2022
Josh Chandulal-Mackay	A New Generation of Leadership	Incumbent councillor since 2016. Also ran for mayor.
Julian Emmett	None	
Ross Fallen	Independent	Councillor since 2022
Awhi Haenga	None	Green endorsed
Mike Hos	A voice for our city's future	
Tracey Jarman	Rates & Community focused	
Kate Joblin	Independent	Councillor since 2016
Sandra Isobel Kyle	Animal Justice Party of Aotearoa NZ	
Michael Law	Independent	Councillor since 2022
Gregory McPhee	None	Also ran for mayor
Charlotte Melser	Independent	Councillor since 2022
Michael Organ	Whanganui First	Subject of the David Farrier documentary Mister Organ
Rob Oscroft	Focus Whanganui	
Peter Oskam	Community before Coin	Also standing for mayor. Councillor since 2022.
Scott Phillips	Every cent counts, every voice matters	
Jay Rerekura	None	
Tony Sundman	None	
Rob Vinsen	Ratepayer focused	Councillor since 2008
Robin Westley	Independent	
Azian Z.	Real solutions for Whanganui	

== Results ==
Overall turnout was 50.32%, with 17,024 voting papers returned.

With the final results, the following candidates were declared elected:

=== Mayor ===
Incumbent mayor Andrew Tripe was re-elected to a second term.

2025 Whanganui mayoral election
Party	Candidate	Votes	%	±%
Independent	Andrew Tripe^{†}	9,147	53.73	+0.36
Independent	Josh Chandulal-Mackay	5,286	31.05	(new)
Independent	Peter Oskam	1,895	11.13	(new)
Independent	Gregory McPhee	295	1.73	(new)
Informal votes		24	0.14	+0.05
Blank votes		377	2.21	+0.12
Turnout		17,024	50.81	+3.34
Registered electors		33,505		
Independent hold				
^{†} incumbent

=== Council ===
==== Whanganui General Ward ====
2025 Whanganui general ward election
Party	Candidate	Votes	%	±%
Independent	Michael Law	8,990	60.20	n/a
Independent	Josh Chandulal-Mackay	8,712	58.34	n/a
Independent	Kate Joblin	8,617	57.70	n/a
Independent	Rob Vinsen	8,226	55.08	n/a
Independent	Charlotte Melser	7,773	52.05	n/a
Independent	Glenda Brown	7,134	47.77	n/a
Independent	Philippa Baker-Hogan	6,836	45.77	n/a
Independent	Mike Hos	6,802	45.55	n/a
Independent	Peter Oskam	6,032	40.39	n/a
Independent	Ross Fallen	5,868	39.29	n/a
Independent	Rob Oscroft	5,304	35.52	n/a
Independent	Jay Rerekura	5,168	34.61	n/a
Independent	Tracey Jarman	3,896	26.09	n/a
Independent	Jason Bardell	3,853	25.80	n/a
Independent	Scott Phillips	3,767	25.22	n/a
Independent	Tony Sundman	3,227	21.61	n/a
Independent Green	Awhi Haenga	3,053	20.44	n/a
Independent	Azian Z	2,662	17.83	n/a
Independent	Julian Emmett	2,272	15.21	n/a
Independent	Michael Organ	1,915	12.82	n/a
Independent	Robin Westley	1,828	12.24	n/a
Animal Justice	Sandra Isobel Kyle	1,823	12.21	n/a
Independent	Gregory McPhee	1,460	9.78	n/a
Informal votes		46	0.31	n/a
Blank votes		107	0.72	n/a
Turnout		14,934	52.04	n/a
Registered electors		28,695		
Independent win (new seat)				
Independent win (new seat)				
Independent win (new seat)				
Independent win (new seat)				
Independent win (new seat)				
Independent win (new seat)				
Independent win (new seat)				
Independent win (new seat)				
Independent win (new seat)				

==== Whanganui Māori Ward ====
2025 Whanganui Māori ward election
Party	Candidate	Votes	%	±%
Independent	Julie Herewini	1,122	53.68	n/a
Independent	Geoff Hipango	922	44.11	n/a
Independent	Kiritahi Firmin	638	30.53	n/a
Independent	Hayden Potaka	538	25.74	n/a
Independent	Phil T Reweti (Bear)	403	19.28	n/a
Informal votes		0	0.00	n/a
Blank votes		21	1.00	n/a
Turnout		2,090	43.45	n/a
Registered electors		4,810		
Independent win (new seat)				
Independent win (new seat)				

=== Māori Ward Poll ===
Choice	Votes	%
I vote to keep the Māori ward	8,292	52.63
I vote to remove the Māori ward	7,462	47.37
Total	15,754	100.00
Valid votes	15,754	92.54
Invalid/blank votes	1,270	7.46
Total votes	17,024	100.00

Māori ward referendum results (excluding invalid votes)
Keep; 8,292 (52.6%)	Remove; 7,462 (47.4%)
▲50%

== See also ==
- 2025 Palmerston North City Council election
