= Kawerau District Council =

Coordinates: 38.0861194°S 176.7001178°E

Kawerau District Council Te Kaunihera o Kawerau

Type
- Type: Unicameral of District
- Houses: Governing Body
- Term limits: None

History
- Founded: 6 March 1989

Leadership
- Mayor: Faylene Tunui

Structure
- Seats: 9 seats (1 mayor, 2 district wide seats, 3 general ward seats and 3 Māori ward seats)
- Length of term: 3 years

Website
- kaweraudc.govt.nz

Kawerau District Council (Māori: Te Kaunihera o Kawerau) is the territorial authority for the Kawerau District of New Zealand.

The council is led by the mayor of Kawerau, who is currently Faylene Tunui. There are also eight councillors representing the district: two District Wide Councillors, three General Ward Councillors and three Māori ward Councillors.

== Composition ==
=== 2019–2022 ===
- Malcolm Campbell, Mayor
- Faylene Tunui, Deputy Mayor
- Carolyn Ion, Councilor
- Warwick Godfery, Councilor
- Berice Julian, Councilor
- Sela Kingi, Councilor
- Aaron Rangihika, Councilor
- Rex Savage, Councilor
- David Sparks, Councilor
