= Mayor of Kawerau =

- Incumbent; Faylene Tunui since 2022
- Style: His/Her Worship
- Seat: 2 Ranfurly Court, Kawerau
- Term length: 3 years
- Formation: November 30, 1959; 66 years ago
- First holder: Clive Boyce
- Salary: $107,246
- Website: Official website

The mayor of Kawerau officiates over the Kawerau District Council. There have been six mayors of Kawerau since 1959. The current mayor is Faylene Tunui, who has been in office since 2022.

== History ==
The area was governed as a borough from 1954 and 1989, and has been administered by a district council since 1989. Between 1954 and 1959, the administration of the borough was headed by a town commissioner, Frank Prideaux, appointed by the governor-general under the terms of the Kawerau and Murupapa Townships Act 1953. Prideaux Park in Kawerau was named in his honour in 1960. He died in 1979.

In 1959, the borough's first mayor, Clive Boyce, was elected. Boyce and his wife, Maisie, had moved to Kawerau from Cambridge in 1954 and opened a general store. Clive Boyce was elected to the Kawerau Advisory Committee in 1955, and served as mayor from 1959 to 1965. The Boyces left Kawerau in 1967. Clive Boyce died in 1991, aged 73. Boyce Park in Kawerau was named after him.

The second mayor, Roy Stoneham, was elected in 1965, and was re-elected unopposed at each election until he died in office in 1983. Stoneham was appointed an Officer of the Order of the British Empire, for services to the community, in the 1977 Queen's Silver Jubilee and Birthday Honours. Originally from England, Stoneham worked at the Tasman pulp and paper mill, and was first appointed to the Kawerau Advisory Committee in 1959. Roy Stoneham Park and Stoneham Walk in Kawerau were named to honour Stoneham's long involvement in local government in the area.

Following Stoneham's death, Ron Hardie was appointed mayor, and held the position until retiring at the 1986 local-body elections. He was later appointed a Member of the Order of the British Empire, for services to local government, in the 1991 New Year Honours. Hardie moved to Kawerau in the 1950s, and worked as a superintendent in the timber yard at the Tasman pulp and paper mill. He died in 1995. Hardie Avenue and the Ron Hardie Recreation Centre in Kawerau have been named in his honour.

Lyn Hartley (née Warbrick) was elected mayor in 1986, having served as deputy mayor for six years, and she retained the position during the transition from borough to district council, stepping down in 2001. A trained nurse, she originally moved to Kawerau to work at the town's maternity hospital. In the 1988 New Year Honours, Hartley was appointed a Member of the Order of the British Empire, for services to the community. She received the New Zealand 1990 Commemoration Medal, and in 1993 she was awarded the New Zealand Suffrage Centennial Medal. She died in 2021. Lyn Hartley Reserve in Kawerau is named in her honour.

Malcolm Campbell served as mayor from 2001 to 2022. He ran a butchery in the town for 46 years, until he closed the business in 2021 after it was severely damaged in a ram-raid and fire. In the 2023 New Year Honours, Campbell was appointed a Member of the New Zealand Order of Merit, for services to local government and the community.

== List of mayors ==
	Name	Portrait	Term of office
1	Clive Boyce		1959–1965
2	Roy Stoneham		1965–1983
3	Ron Hardie		1983–1986
4	Lyn Hartley		1986–2001
5	Malcolm Campbell		2001–2022
6	Faylene Tunui		2022–present

== List of deputy mayors ==
No.	Name	Term of office	Mayor
1	Harold Ion	1959–1965	Boyce
2	Monika Lanham	1965–1974	Stoneham
?	Unknown	1974–1980	Stoneham
?	Lyn Hartley	1980–1986	Hardie
?	Unknown	1986–1996	Hartley
?	Tony Geor	1996–1998	Hartley
?	Malcolm Campbell	1998–2001	Hartley
?	Unknown	2001–c. 2007	Campbell
?	Bernie Joyes	fl.2007–2013	Campbell
?	Alastair Holmes	2013–2016	Campbell
?	Faylene Tunui	2016–2022	Campbell
?	Aaron Rangihika	2022–2025	Tunui
?	Sela Kingi	2025–present	Tunui
