= Ministry for Cities, Environment, Regions and Transport =

Public Service Department in New Zealand

Agency overview
- Formed: 1 July 2026
- Preceding agencies: Ministry for the Environment; Ministry of Housing and Urban Development; Ministry of Transport
- Jurisdiction: New Zealand
- Minister responsible: Chris Bishop, Minister for Housing, Transport, RMA Reform and Infrastructure
- Agency executive: Jeremy Lightfoot, Chief executive
- Website: www.mcert.govt.nz

The Ministry for Cities, Environment, Regions and Transport (MCERT) is a public service department of New Zealand. It was established on 1 July 2026 through an amalgamation of the Ministry for the Environment, Ministry of Housing and Urban Development, Ministry of Transport, and the local government functions of the Department of Internal Affairs.

== History ==
The Ministry was announced in December 2025 as a new agency that replaces the Ministry for the Environment, the Ministry of Housing and Urban Development, and the Ministry of Transport, and takes the local government functions from the Department of Internal Affairs. A paper taken to Cabinet by public service minister Judith Collins and RMA reform minister Chris Bishop that month noted that the new agency will reduce fragmentation, "provide joined-up advice to solve problems, with a regional focus" and "strengthen performance monitoring across interdependent systems."

Jeremy Lightfoot was named the inaugural chief executive on 1 April 2026, the same day that the Ministry was formally created by an amendment to the schedule of agencies in the Public Service Act 2020. The Ministry became fully operational on 1 July 2026.

== Ministers ==
The Ministry was formed through an amalgamation of these current ministerial portfolios.

Officeholder	Portfolios	Other responsibilities
Hon Chris Bishop	Minister for Housing; Minister for Transport	Minister Responsible for RMA Reform
Hon Tama Potaka		Associate Minister for Housing
Hon Simon Watts	Minister for Local Government; Minister for Climate Change	
Hon Nicola Grigg	Minister for the Environment	
Hon Andrew Hoggard		Associate Minister for the Environment
Hon James Meager		Associate Minister for Transport
