= Ngāi Tahu Holdings =

Business in tourism, fisheries, property, and forestry

Ngāi Tahu Holdings Corporation
- Trade name: Ngāi Tahu Holdings
- Type: Private
- Industry: Holding
- Founded: 10 December 1992; 33 years ago in Christchurch, New Zealand
- Headquarters: 15 Show Place, Addington, Christchurch, New Zealand
- Areas served: New Zealand, Fiji, Australia, China, United States of America
- Key people: Todd Moyle (CE)
- Revenue: ▲NZ$347.3 million (2024)
- Operating income: ▲NZ$63.1 million (2024)
- Net income: ▼NZ$42.4 million (2024)
- Total assets: ▲NZ$2.096 billion (2024)
- Total equity: ▲NZ$1.656 billion (2024)
- Owner: Ngāi Tahu Charitable Trust
- Members: 83,087 (2024)
- Divisions: Ngāi Tahu Property; Ngāi Tahu Seafood; Ngāi Tahu Tourism; Ngāi Tahu Farming; Ngāi Tahu Investments
- Footnotes; Ngāi Tahu Holdings distributes c.4% of equity annually to Te Rūnanga o Ngāi Tahu, with $84.6M distributed in 2024.

Ngāi Tahu Holdings Corporation Limited is owned by the Ngāi Tahu iwi of the South Island of the New Zealand. Its main interests are in tourism, fisheries, property and forestry and it is among the wealthiest iwi in New Zealand. Ngāi Tahu annually contributes more than $200 million to the South Island economy.

== History ==
Ngāi Tahu has been engaged in modern-day commercial activities since the late 1950s when the Ngāi Tahu Māori Trust Board had an annual income of about $20,000 to put toward investment and distribution through the iwi. Ngāi Tahu used the income to reinvest and grow the asset base of the tribe. From the beginning, Ngāi Tahu's fiscal policy involved reinvesting roughly two thirds of income and maintaining a tightly focused distribution policy to provide support to tribal members through education grants and scholarships.

As a result of the Ngāi Tahu Claims Settlement Act 1998, Ngāi Tahu received a settlement sum of $170 million. It also subsequently involved fisheries and aquaculture assets valued at $71 million.

As a result of the 2011 Christchurch earthquake, Ngāi Tahu reported a $4.7 million after-tax net-loss, down from a $27.8 million net-profit the previous financial year. Over $18 million worth of value adjustments were made to investment properties owned by the group as a whole, and over $9 million worth of direct quake writedown. However, insurance claims were lodged by the group and payments are expected within the 2012 financial year.

In 2013, Ngāi Tahu received a relativity payment of $68 million from the New Zealand Government under their settlement agreement in the 1990s.

By the end of 2013, Ngāi Tahu had assets of around $1 billion, of which 56 per cent are in property, 20 per cent are in capital, 9 per cent in tourism, 7 per cent in seafood, 6 per cent in fisheries settlement and 2 per cent in other holdings.

== Subsidiaries and investments ==
=== Ngāi Tahu Tourism ===
==== Shotover Jet ====
According to the New Zealand Companies Office Shotover Jet Limited is 100 percent owned by Ngāi Tahu Tourism since 16 July 2007.

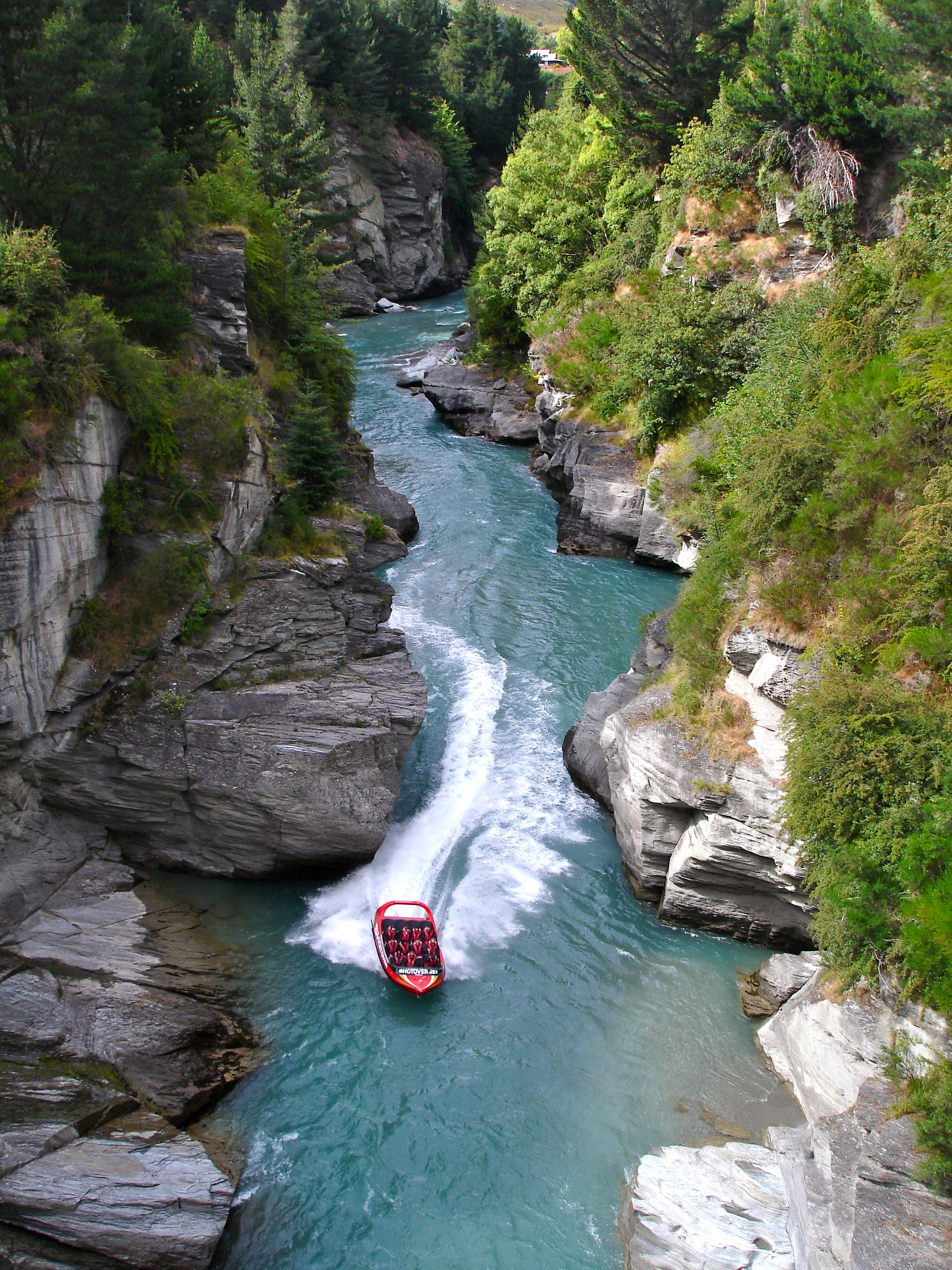
The Shotover Jet in Queenstown is one of several assets owned by Ngāi Tahu Holdings.

In 1999, Ngāi Tahu Holdings acquired a 38 percent stake in Queenstown's Shotover Jet. In August 1999, Ngāi Tahu Holdings raised its stake to 49%. It was reported on 30 October 2001 that Ngāi Tahu Holdings had raised its stake in Shotover Jet to 80%.

On 10 September 2002, Ngāi Tahu sought to acquire the remaining 18 percent of Shotover it didn't own, at 60 cents a share. Included in Shotover's assets were the Shotover, Dart, Kawarau and Waikato rivers' speedboat attractions, Rainbow Springs and Farm, as well as a jetboat business in Fiji. On 9 October, this bid was taken up to 70c a share. By 12 November 2002, Ngāi Tahu held 88.3% of all Shotover shares.

On 5 May 2004 it was reported that Ngāi Tahu had used New Zealand Compulsory Acquisitions Laws to acquire the remaining stake of Shotover they didn't already own. Shotover was de-listed from the NZX on 7 May 2004.

All Shotover operations in New Zealand were suspended on 1 January 2006 due to an engine fire on a boat. Operations resumed on 5 January.

In May 2009 Ngāi Tahu Tourism and Shotover Jet took Queenstown Water Taxis to court for using the well-known Shotover fleet colour of red on one of its jet boats causing confusion for tourists. The court ruled for Shotover and ordered Queenstown Water Taxis to repaint their boat and to pay the legal expenses of Ngāi Tahu Tourism and Shotover Jet, as well as to pay $9,380 costs.

Shotover Jet made the news when the Duke and Duchess of Cambridge participated in a Shotover ride in April 2014. David Kennedy, Regional General Manager for Ngāi Tahu Tourism said, "[William and Catherine] have requested a normal Shotover Jet boat trip, which is always cautious but it's still the most exciting jetboat ride in the world. "They'll be doing 360-degree spins and going within half a metre of the rocks."

==== Rainbow Springs ====
Founded in 1929 by Ted Bruce, Rainbow Springs has become one of the most visited tourism attractions in Rotorua. Between 1929 and 1932, Rainbow Springs was expanded by building cabins, a campground and caravan park. The park was acquired by The Shotover Group in 1995, became the direct property of Ngāi Tahu Holdings in 2004, and was transferred to Ngāi Tahu Tourism ownership in July 2007.

In May 2011, Ngāi Tahu announced it would spend $10 million constructing "The Big Splash", a water-based attraction, within its Rainbow Springs property. On 1 March 2022, Ngāi Tahu Tourism announced the closure of Rainbow Springs Nature Park, saying that the tourism operation was no longer financially viable. It was also announced that the National Kiwi Hatchery at Rainbow Springs would continue to operate while plans were made to move it to the Agrodome.

==== Agrodome ====
In September 2011 it was confirmed that Ngāi Tahu had acquired a stake in the Agrodome in Rotorua. Ngāi Tahu's initial investment in The Agrodome was a 75 percent stake. Company Office records show that the current Agrodome Limited company was registered on 12 August 2011 and is indirectly owned by Ngāi Tahu Tourism Limited, via its direct subsidiary, CNI Tourism Limited. Twenty five percent of the company was owned by Harbow Trust Limited between the registration of Agrodome Limited in 2011 and July 2014.

As well as being a tourist attraction, Agrodome operates a 133 ha sheep and cattle farm, and olive groves. To celebrate a successful olive harvest in 2014, Ngāi Tahu promoted and celebrated its first annual Olive Festival.

==== 2020 coronavirus pandemic ====
On 23 April 2020, Ngāi Tahu Tourism announced its intention to close its businesses, as a result of the COVID-19 pandemic, with the loss of over 300 jobs. It was expected that a final decision would be made in May 2020, following a period of consultation with staff.

=== Ngāi Tahu Capital ===
==== Ryman Healthcare ====
Ngāi Tahu first invested in Ryman Healthcare in 1996 in a partnership with Canadian Equity-firm Direct Capital Partners, that gave them 50% of the company; or 25% each.

It was reported on 30 October 2001 that Ngāi Tahu's stake in Ryman had been decreased to 20%.

On 19 June 2003, Ngāi Tahu's stake was diluted down to 16% upon the issuance of new shares.

In February 2007, Ngāi Tahu sold 6% of their Ryman shares to 'global investment firm' Babcock & Brown, for $2.10 per share, taking their remaining shareholding down to 6.5%.

In February 2008, Ngāi Tahu increased its shareholding to 8%.

In October 2013, it was reported that Ngāi Tahu had a shareholding of 6%.

According to the Companies Office Ngāi Tahu Capital directly own 4.84% of Ryman Healthcare as of April 2016.

==== PGG Wrightson ====
In April 2011, it was reported that Ngāi Tahu had invested a $15,000,000 investment in a joint-venture vehicle with the purpose of owning shares in the agriculture company PGG Wrightson. It was later confirmed that Ngāi Tahu had entered into an agreement with Agria Corporation, a Singaporean agriculture company, and New Hope Group, a Chinese investment company, to invest in the vehicle used to take over a 57.68% share in PGG Wrightson. Ngāi Tahu holds a 7.09% shareholding in the investment vehicle, Agria (Singapore) Pte Ltd.

After the deal went through, then chief executive officer of Ngāi Tahu Holdings, Greg Campbell, said, "This is an extremely valuable proposition from a strategic and relationship perspective and it is great to be able to announce this joint venture particularly given the recent tragic events in Christchurch."

According to the New Zealand Companies Office, Agria Singapore, held a 50.22% shareholding as of December 2016.

=== Ngāi Tahu Seafood ===
Ngāi Tahu Seafood was established to manage the fishing quota received by Ngāi Tahu following settlement with the Crown in 1992 as a direct consequence of a recommendation by The Waitangi Tribunal. Ngāi Tahu Seafood is headquartered adjacent to the International Airport of Christchurch, New Zealand. Ngāi Tahu Seafood also holds substantial fishing quotas in rock lobster, pāua, blue cod, Bluff oysters and New Zealand greenshell mussels and a multitude of other species. The company have facilities in Bluff, Christchurch, Kaikōura and Picton; and range from simple, wharf-based receiving chillers through to full, export-registered processing plants. Ngāi Tahu Seafood is a major supplier of New Zealand seafood to international and domestic markets, under the TAHU brand.

==== In the media ====
On 29 August 2007, it was stated that Ngāi Tahu had formed Joint-Ventures in the Chatham Islands, to process Pāua, Kina, and Wetfish species, and in China to build up live lobster exports.

In April 2008, Ngāi Tahu Seafood General Manager Geoff Hipkins travelled to China as a part of the New Zealand delegation to sign the New Zealand-China Free Trade Agreement. Whilst there, the goal of Mr. Hipkins was to attempt to find more "ports of call" into the Chinese market. He travelled to Shanghai, Beijing, and Wuhan on behalf of Ngāi Tahu Seafood.

Between 2011 and 2014 Ngāi Tahu started acquiring fishing quotas in South Australia for importation and sale in China.

=== Ngāi Tahu Property ===
Ngāi Tahu Property owns multiple ex-government and/or council owned properties. Ngāi Tahu holds right of first refusal to acquire any state-owned property within its exclusive economic area. In 2010, Ngāi Tahu Property held assets in the tune of $450,000,000; including but not limited to, the Queenstown Police Station, Christchurch Courts, and 50 percent of the Christchurch City Council Headquarters.

In August 2011, it was mentioned in a New Zealand Herald article that Ngāi Tahu owns 83,600 ha of "rural land", of which around 90 percent are leased to third-party forestry organisations.

==== Lincoln University development ====
In November 2007, Ngāi Tahu Property entered a joint venture with Lincoln University to develop former dairying land on the edge of the Lincoln township into housing for students. The land, which is owned by the university, was formerly used as a research farm but was decommissioned in 2001 and subsequently establishment as a 160 ha dairy farm between Lincoln and Springston. The subdivision is planned to encompass 117 ha on the western edge of the town and "will achieve a long-anticipated connection between the town and the Lincoln University central campus," according to Ngāi Tahu Property general manager Tony Sewell. The properties will be released in stages over the next 12 years. There will be over 1000 sections and will incorporate additional community services and education facilities in the area.

==== Prestons subdivision ====
Prestons is a subdivision developed by Ngāi Tahu Property, Foodstuffs South Island, and CDL Land New Zealand. Prestons first 200 Sections were released for purchase on 16 October 2012.

Ngāi Tahu Property as well as the local councils and Canterbury Earthquake Recovery Authority engaged in discussions to fast-track zoning permission by Earthquake Recovery Minister Gerry Brownlee under the Canterbury Earthquake Recovery Act in order to open up land to those in the designated 'Red Zone' to buy and move to.

=== Tainui joint ventures ===
==== Initial ventures ====
On 26 November 2007, the Herald announced that Ngāi Tahu and Tainui had met at Arowhenua Marae in South Canterbury and signed deals to establish formal intentions on 23 November 2007 to work together, using a memorandum of understanding to form a basis to establish a working environment between the two iwi.

New Zealand Labour Party MP Shane Jones said, "You need to remember that Maori trusts and iwi organisations, they're very rarely sellers. They like to hold assets for a long, long time, and given the amount of foreign ownership in the economy, it's good that tribes work together and help to buy back some of those assets that looked lost."

As the first joint-activity of the two tribes, in February 2009, Ngāi Tahu acquired 6% of Ryman Healthcare and subsequently on-sold 4.5% to Tainui; raisings its shareholding in Ryman to 8%, and establishing Tainui as a shareholder.

==== Waikato Milking Systems ====
In June 2014, Tainui and Ngāi Tahu as well as Pioneer Capital acquired Waikato Milking Systems NZ Limited under a limited partnership, Waikato Milking Systems LP. The partners have stated that they intend to grow the company, either naturally, or by mergers and acquisitions. The company is New Zealand's biggest manufacturer and designer of milking systems, and runs all aspects of its systems, from the stainless steel to the software that helps run the cowsheds. The company, at the time of purchase, had an annual turnover quickly approaching $100 million. All three companies have an equal 33.30% share is the limited partnership.

==== GoBus ====
In August 2014, Ngāi Tahu and Tainui purchased GoBus from Australian private equity-firm Next Capital. The total purchase price was $170 million. The purchase is expected to gain approval from New Zealand's Overseas Investment Office due to the company selling GoBus being Australian-owned.

Ngāi Tahu Chief Executive Officer, Mike Sang said, "Go Bus will enable us to further grow and diversify our portfolio in a way that is complementary to the rest of our investments."

In the deal, Ngāi Tahu acquired 67% and Tainui acquired a 33% stake in GoBus.

In March 2016 GoBus won the rights to operate four South Auckland public bus routes, taking the rights from established Infratil. The contracts commenced in October 2016, and GoBus is supplying 89 buses, most of which are brand new low-emission buses built locally in New Zealand. The company said it would invest $40 million in new vehicles and equipment as well as establishing two new depot facilities, providing over 250 new driver and management jobs. GoBus also provides school bus services, special needs transport as well as some tour and charter services. GoBus has about 360 urban service buses in its fleet of over 1600 vehicles, and employ more than 1900 staff. GoBus managing director Calum Haslop said, "Entry into the Auckland market signals a new phase in our continued growth."

In August 2016, GoBus announced that they had acquired Johnston's Coachlines for an undisclosed sum. Johnston's is a tourism-based bus company with depots in Auckland, Christchurch and Queenstown. The main purpose of the acquisition was the companies experience in the high-end tour market. It was stated that the companies will operate in a parent-subsidiary manner as Johnston's will retain its own brand and division.

=== Other investments ===
==== Tahu FM ====
Tahu FM is the iwi's official radio station. It began as Christchurch's Te Reo Iriraki Ki Otautahi on 6 February 1991. Between 1996 and 2001, it formed a broadcasting partnership with Mai FM and began playing more urban contemporary music. It changed its name to Tahu FM in December 1997, and briefly changed its name to Mai FM in 1999 before reverting to Tahu FM. It broadcasts in Christchurch on 90.5 FM. In 2000 it began broadcasting Kaikōura on 90.7 FM, Dunedin on 95.0 FM, Invercargill on 99.6 FM, and around the country on 505 Sky Digital. Tahu FM resumed broadcasting five days after the 2011 Christchurch earthquake, with assistance from Te Upoko O Te Ika and other iwi radio stations, and operated as the city's Māori language civil defence station. In December 2014 it was recognised as the country's highest-rating Māori radio station.

==== Dillions Point properties ====
In October 2000, Ngāi Tahu invested over $9 million in acquiring six vineyards totaling roughly 69 hectares of land. In the aftermath of the acquisition, Ngāi Tahu agreed to supply Gieson Holdings grapes for their wines. This venture is called Dillons Point Properties.

==== Others ====
In 1997, the New Zealand Government awarded Ngāi Tahu with the rights of ownership to the Pounamu stocks in the South Island of New Zealand

It was reported October 2001, that Ngāi Tahu Holdings had a 43% ownership of Whale Watch Kaikōura. It was also reported that Ngāi Tahu Holdings acquired Proseed, a large-scale tree-seed supplier in July 2001.

==== South Canterbury Finance ====
In August 2010, a consortium of investors offered to acquire the failed South Canterbury Finance business from the receivers, but It was rejected. The consortium, Permanent Investments Limited, revised and resubmitted it on 13 September. The original plan was declined due to receivers McGrath Nichol seeking advice from multiple advisers, including The Treasury.

It October Ngāi Tahu Holdings was named, along with the New Zealand Superannuation Fund and others, as being part of the consortium that failed to acquire South Canterbury Finance in a $1.3 billion deal. Ngāi Tahu said its participation in the bid was an attempt to broaden its business portfolio.

==== Ruataniwha Water Storage Scheme ====
On 19 September the National Business Review released an article announcing Ngāi Tahu and TrustPower, and Hawkes Bay Regional Investment Company were in talks to mutually invest in the Ruataniwha Water Storage Scheme. It was also said that Ngāi Tahu and TrustPower could pay up to 40%, or $105 million, of the $265 million projects costs, costing approximately $52.5 million each.

On Friday 20 September 2013, the New Zealand Herald reported that Ngāi Tahu, TrustPower, and Hawkes Bay Regional Investment Company had signed a memorandum of understanding with the intentions to mutually invest into the controversial Ruataniwha Water Storage Scheme.

Many local Māori were against the scheme going forward, and because of this, Ngāi Tahu advised the local iwi, Ngāti Kahungungu, that on their request, Ngāi Tahu will pull the plug on any future involvement with the Scheme.

On 26 September 2013, it was reported in the Hawke's Bay Today that Ngāi Tahu had already invested an undisclosed amount of money into the Water Storage Scheme, which caused surprise within local iwi.

In early 2014 TrustPower pulled out of the deal. As a result of this, the deal did not meet Ngāi i Tahu's investment criteria under the pre-signed memorandum. Due to this, Ngāi Tahu pulled out of the Scheme in May 2014.

==== Expressed interest ====
In November 2011, Ngāi Tahu publicly expressed an interest in establishing an alliance of iwi to acquire up to 20% of each power company floated by the Government, including, but not limited to, Mighty River Power and Genesis Energy.

In December 2013, Ngāi Tahu Tourism announced plans to lease 0.75ha of council-owned land to construct Queenstown Hot Pools, a $25 million hot pool complex of 12 large, and 6 small pools as well as a host of other amenities.

== Group awards ==
Any award that has been indirectly and/or directly awarded to a direct subsidiary of Ngāi Tahu Holdings shall be listed below.

Year	Award	Awarded by	Awarded to	Notes
2016	Health and Medical Property Award	Property Council of New Zealand Industry Awards	Ngāi Tahu Property	
2016	Urban Land Developments Award	Property Council of New Zealand Industry Awards	Ngāi Tahu Property	
2016	Gold Award for Product Innovation	CTW (Chinese Tourist Welcome) Awards	Ngāi Tahu Tourism	
2016	Outstanding Maori Business Leadership	Aotearoa NZ Maori Business Leaders Awards	Ngāi Tahu Holdings	
2016	Maori Excellence in Export	New Zealand International Business Awards	Ngāi Tahu Tourism	
2015	Auckland International Airport Award for Excellence in Tourism	NZCTA HSBC China Business Awards	Ngāi Tahu Tourism	
2015	Excellence in Environmental Management Award	Synlait's Suppliers Awards	Ngāi Tahu Farming	
2014	Environment Canterbury Water Quality Award	Ballance Farm Environment Awards	Ngāi Tahu Farming	
