= Agrodome =

New Zealand tourist attraction

- Sheep dog presentation
- Interactive map of Agrodome
- Location: Ngongotahā, Rotorua, New Zealand
- Coordinates: 38.086154°S 176.192964°E
- Status: Operating
- Opened: 1971
- Owner: Ngāi Tahu Tourism
- Theme: Working farm
- Operating season: All year
- Area: 350 acres (140 ha)

Attractions
- Shows: Sheep shearing
- Website: Official website

The Agrodome is a farm theme park in Rotorua, New Zealand. Founded by Godfrey Bowen and George Harford in 1971, it is a major tourist attraction. It has been majority-owned by Christchurch-based Ngāi Tahu Tourism since 2011.

== History ==
The Agrodome was set up in 1971 by Godfrey Bowen and George Harford as a farm theme park. Bowen was a world championship sheep shearer with a large international reputation and Harford was a local farmer. The venture was part-funded by the government as a tourism initiative. Bowen's brother Ivan, also an expert shearer, was the Agrodome's chief showman.

The National Kiwi Hatchery, previously at Rainbow Springs, opened in a new facility at the Agrodome in December 2023.

== Attractions and activities ==
In 2016, the Agrodome management bought a trio of Clydesdale horses that had been a tourist attraction in the Auckland suburb of Devonport and that had acting roles in The Hobbit and Xena: Warrior Princess. Since 2018, the Agrodome holds Valais Blacknose sheep, which are new to the country. The purchase brought the number of sheep breeds at the Agrodome to 26.

The annual Rotorua A&P (agricultural and pastoral) Show is held at the Agrodome. The 2016 secondary schools cross country championships were held at the Agrodome.

There are three farm shows held per day lasting one hour each. Components include sheep shearing, learning about farm animals. The show, which is both educational and entertaining, is popular with both tourists and locals.

== Ownership ==
The Agrodome was owned by the Bowen and Hartford families. In 2006, the families bought the Lakeland Queen from receivers; the ship is used as a restaurant and for cruises on Lake Rotorua. In 2011, Ngāi Tahu Tourism was brought in as a business partner with experience in the tourism market, with the iwi obtaining a 75% shareholding.
