= Results of the 2025 New Zealand territorial authority elections in Hawke's Bay =

2025 New Zealand territorial authority elections (Hawke's Bay)
- 11 October 2025
- Turnout: 57,410 (47.36% ▲13.15 pp)
- 4 of 4 local councils
| Party | Councils | +/– |
|---|---|---|
| No majority | 4 | 0 |
This lists parties that won seats. See the complete results below.
- 4 mayors and 41 local councillors
| Party | Seats | +/– |
Mayors
| Independent | 4 | 0 |
Local councillors
| Independent | 39 | 0 |
| Independent Green | 1 | +1 |
| CARE for Hastings | 1 | +1 |
This lists parties that won seats. See the complete results below.

Elections for the territorial authorities of New Zealand were held from 9 September until 11 October 2025 as part of that year's nation-wide local elections. 709 local councillors and 66 mayors were elected across 66 of 67 councils.

4 territorial authorities are primarily within the Hawke's Bay Region. 4 mayors and 41 local councillors were elected. 1 of 4 mayors were re-elected and no group gained or held a majority on any council.

== Maps ==

Legend
| Independent hold | Independent gain |
| | Independent Green gain |
| | CARE for Hastings gain |

== Summary ==
=== Overall ===
| Council | Electoral system | Seats | Mayor | Councillors | Control | Turnout | Details | Refs |
|---|---|---|---|---|---|---|---|---|
| Wairoa | FPP | 6 | ▌ Independent hold | ▌ Independent 6 ( 0) | ▌ No majority | 3,192; 56.05% ▲4.57 pp | Details | |
| Hastings | FPP | 15 | ▌ Independent gain | ▌ Independent 13 (▼1) ▌ Independent Green 1 (▲1) ▌ CARE for Hastings 1 (▲1) | ▌ No majority | 26,759; 45.84% ▲12.12 pp | Details | |
| Napier | FPP | 11 | ▌ Independent gain | ▌ Independent 11 (▲1) | ▌ No majority | 21,325; 46.08% ▲5.94 pp | Details | |
| Central Hawke's Bay | FPP | 9 | ▌ Independent gain | ▌ Independent 9 ( 0) | ▌ No majority | 6,134; 56.39% ▲12.08 pp | Details | |
| 4 of 4 councils | | 41 | | | | | | |

=== Mayors ===
| Territorial authority | Incumbent | Elected | Runner-up | Details | Refs |
|---|---|---|---|---|---|
| Wairoa | Craig Little (Ind) | | Denise Eaglesome-Karekare (Ind) | Details | |
| Hastings | Sandra Hazlehurst^{R} (Ind) | Wendy Schollum (Ind) | Marcus Buddo (Ind) | Details | |
| Napier | Kirsten Wise (Ind) | Richard McGrath (Ind) | Kirsten Wise (Ind) | Details | |
| Central Hawke's Bay | Alex Walker (Ind) | Will Foley (Ind) | Alex Walker (Ind) | Details | |
^{R} did not run for re-election

=== Candidates ===
| Party / ticket | Mayors | | | | Councillors | | | |
| Party / ticket | 2022 | Candidates | Elected | +/− | 2022 | Candidates | Elected | +/− |
|---|---|---|---|---|---|---|---|---|
| Independent | 4 | 14 | 4 | 0 | 39 | 83 | 39 | ▲1 |
| Independent Green | no candidates | | | | 0 | 1 | 1 | ▲1 |
| CARE for Hastings | no candidates | | | | (new) | 2 | 1 | ▲1 |
| ACT Local | no candidates | | | | (new) | 1 | 0 | 0 |
| Working Together | no candidates | | | | 2 | 0 | 0 | ▼2 |
| Seats: | 10 | | 10 | 0 | 41 | | 41 | 0 |

== Wairoa District Council ==
2025 Wairoa District Council election
- 11 October 2025
- Turnout: 3,192 (56.05% ▲4.57 pp)
- Mayor
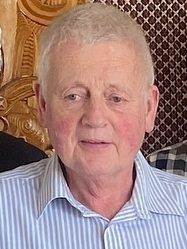

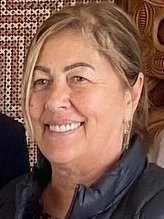
| Candidate | Craig Little | Denise Eaglesome-Karekare |
| Party | Independent | Independent |
| Popular vote | 1,635 | 1,287 |
| Percentage | 51.22% | 40.32% |
Mayor before election
Craig Little
Independent
Elected mayor
Craig Little
Independent
- Councillors
- 6 seats on the governing body of Wairoa District Council; 4 seats needed for a majority
| Party | Seats | +/– |
|---|---|---|
| Independent | 6 | 0 |
This lists parties that won seats. See the complete results below.
| Control before | Control after |
|---|---|
| No majority | No majority |

=== 2025 Wairoa mayoral election ===
2025 Wairoa mayoral election
| Party | Candidate | Votes | % | ±% |
|---|---|---|---|---|
| Independent | Craig Little^{†} | 1,635 | 51.22 | −0.67 |
| Independent | Denise Eaglesome-Karekare | 1,287 | 40.32 | (new) |
| Independent | Kurawari Panere | 146 | 4.57 | (new) |
| Independent | Camden Gaskin | 86 | 2.69 | (new) |
| Informal votes | | 3 | 0.09 | −0.01 |
| Blank votes | | 35 | 1.10 | −0.02 |
| Turnout | | 3,192 | 56.05 | +4.57 |
| Registered electors | | 5,695 | | |
| Independent hold | | | | |
^{†} incumbent

=== Wairoa general ward ===
2025 Wairoa general ward election
| Party | Candidate | Votes | % | ±% |
|---|---|---|---|---|
| Independent | Jeremy Harker^{†} | 1,235 | 67.05 | +6.84 |
| Independent | Roz Thomas^{†} | 856 | 46.47 | −4.18 |
| Independent | Sara Bird | 698 | 37.89 | (new) |
| Independent | Amber Forrest | 564 | 30.62 | (new) |
| Independent | Sam Jackman | 518 | 28.12 | (new) |
| Independent | Veronica Grace Tukaki | 407 | 22.10 | (new) |
| Independent | John Malis | 286 | 15.53 | (new) |
| Independent | Stuart Harris | 259 | 14.06 | (new) |
| Independent | Camden Gaskin | 111 | 6.03 | (new) |
| Informal votes | | 2 | 0.11 | +0.11 |
| Blank votes | | 28 | 1.52 | −0.21 |
| Turnout | | 1,842 | 59.34 | +1.48 |
| Registered electors | | 3,104 | | |
| Independent hold | | | | |
| Independent hold | | | | |
| Independent gain from Independent | | | | |
^{†} incumbent

=== Wairoa Māori ward ===
2025 Wairoa Māori ward election
| Party | Candidate | Votes | % | ±% |
|---|---|---|---|---|
| Independent | Trevor Teotaia Hirini Waikawa | 821 | 60.81 | (new) |
| Independent | Benita Cairns^{†} | 724 | 53.63 | −12.77 |
| Independent | Michelle Tahuri | 561 | 41.56 | (new) |
| Independent | Katarina Kawana | 420 | 31.11 | (new) |
| Independent | Esta Makere Wainohu | 397 | 29.41 | (new) |
| Independent | Puti Cook | 192 | 14.22 | (new) |
| Independent | Kurawari Panere | 189 | 14.00 | (new) |
| Independent | Ally Tipu | 153 | 11.33 | (new) |
| Independent | Marino Harker-Smith | 128 | 9.48 | (new) |
| Informal votes | | 0 | 0.00 | −0.30 |
| Blank votes | | 7 | 0.52 | −2.44 |
| Turnout | | 1,350 | 52.10 | +9.25 |
| Registered electors | | 2,591 | | |
| Independent gain from Independent | | | | |
| Independent hold | | | | |
| Independent gain from Independent | | | | |
^{†} incumbent

== Hastings District Council ==
2025 Hastings District Council election
- 11 October 2025
- Turnout: 26,759 (45.84% ▲12.12 pp)
- Mayor
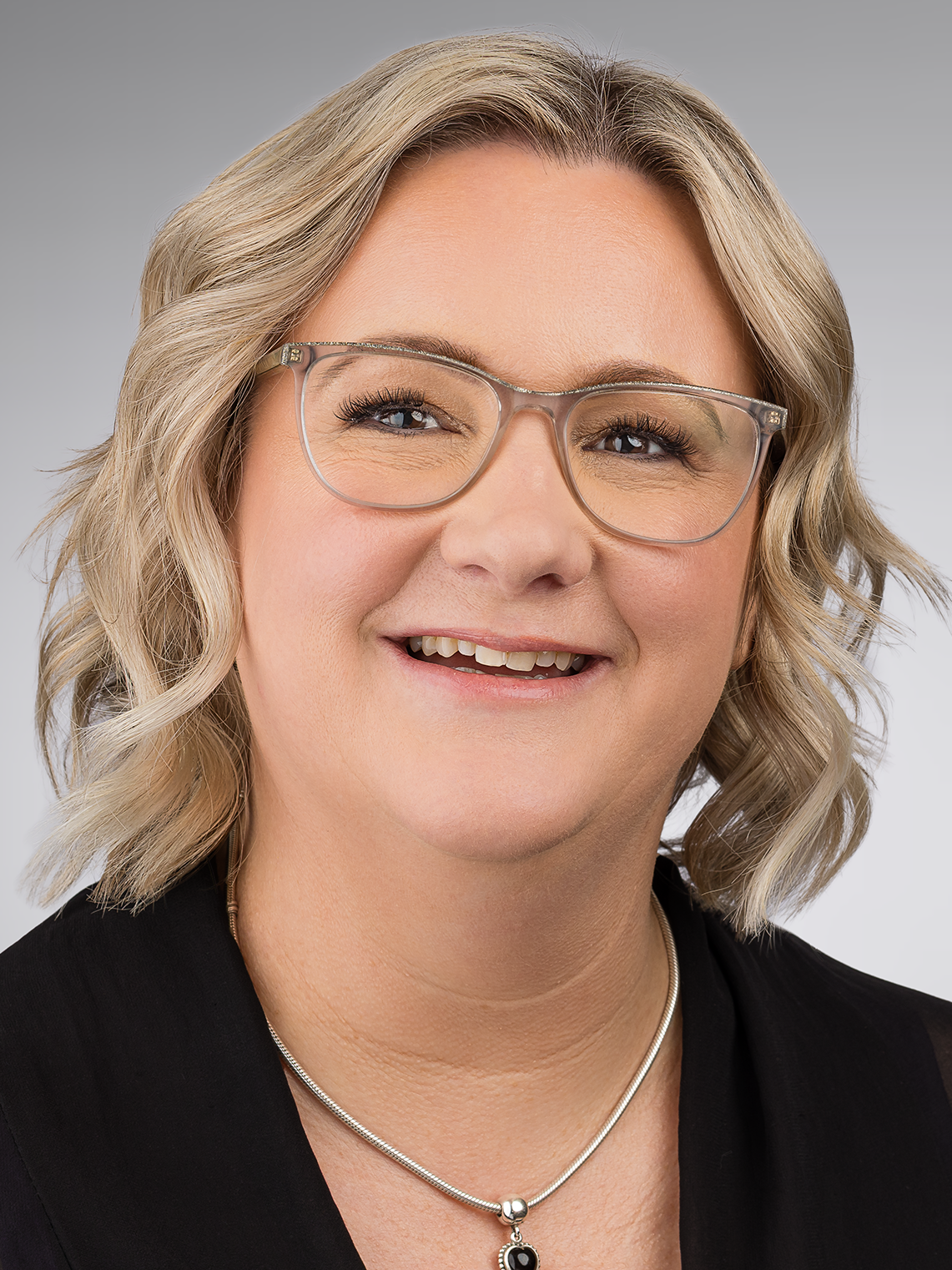

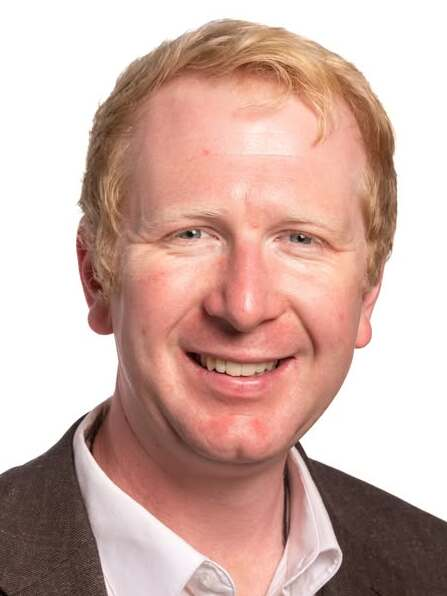

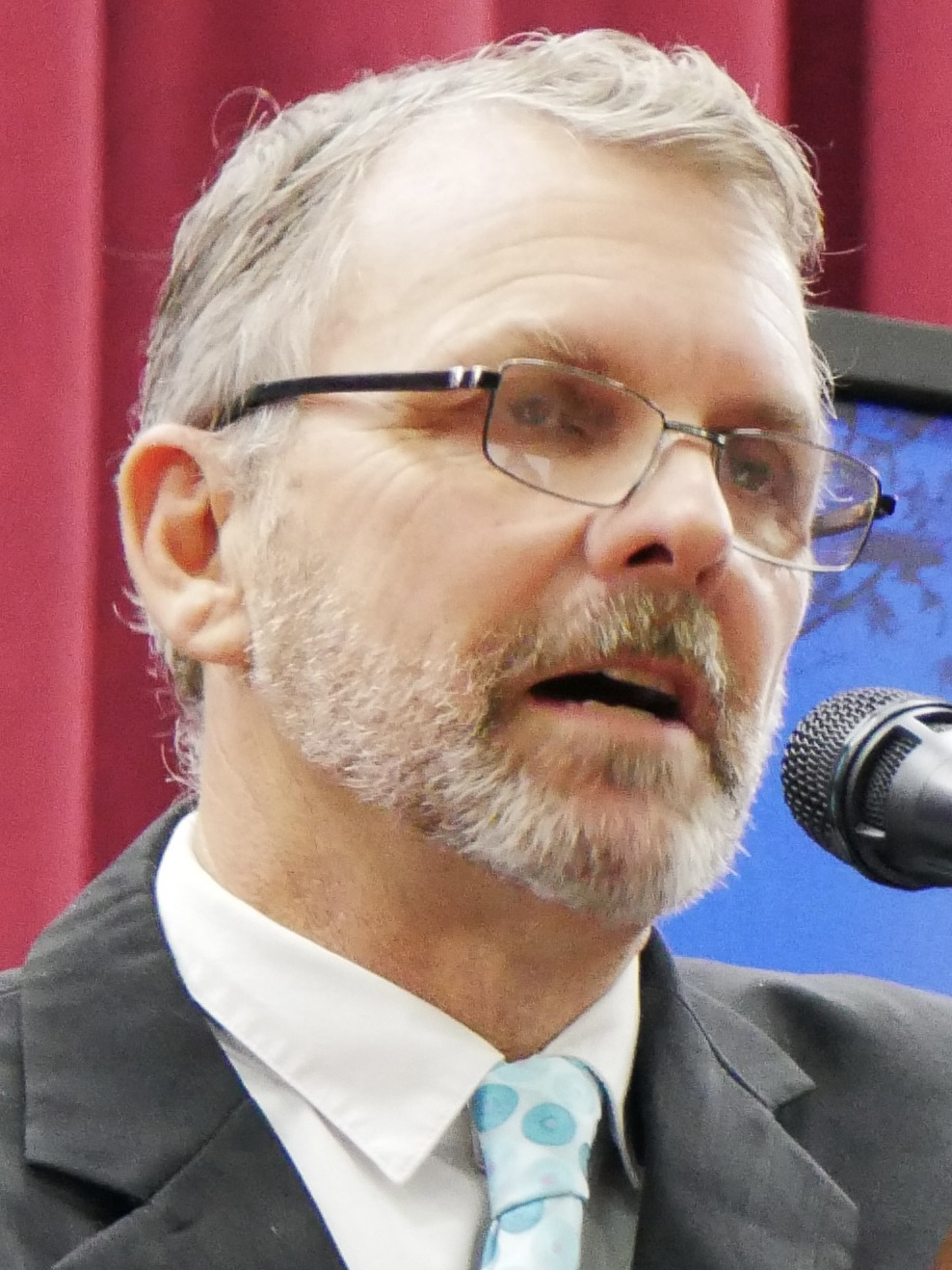

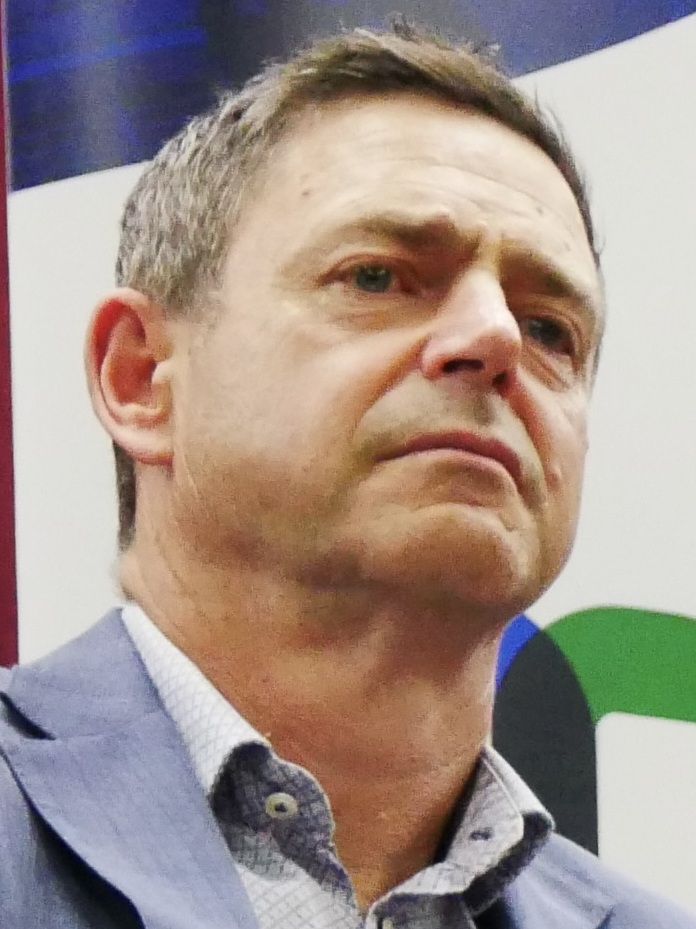
| Candidate | Wendy Schollum | Marcus Buddo |
| Party | Independent | Independent |
| Popular vote | 7,212 | 6,613 |
| Percentage | 26.95% | 24.71% |
| Candidate | Steve Gibson | Damon Harvey |
| Party | Independent | Independent |
| Popular vote | 5,810 | 5,569 |
| Percentage | 21.71% | 20.81% |
Mayor before election
Sandra Hazlehurst
Independent
Elected mayor
Wendy Schollum
Independent
- Councillors
- 15 seats on the governing body of Hastings District Council; 8 seats needed for a majority
| Party | Seats | +/– |
|---|---|---|
| Independent | 13 | −1 |
| Independent Green | 1 | +1 |
| CARE for Hastings | 1 | +1 |
This lists parties that won seats. See the complete results below.
| Control before | Control after |
|---|---|
| No majority | No majority |

=== 2025 Hastings mayoral election ===
2025 Hastings mayoral election
| Party | Candidate | Votes | % | ±% |
|---|---|---|---|---|
| Independent | Wendy Schollum | 7,212 | 26.95 | (new) |
| Independent | Marcus Buddo | 6,613 | 24.71 | (new) |
| Independent | Steve Gibson | 5,810 | 21.71 | (new) |
| Independent | Damon Harvey | 5,569 | 20.81 | (new) |
| Independent | Darrin Wilson | 1,107 | 4.14 | (new) |
| Informal votes | | 42 | 0.16 | n/a |
| Blank votes | | 406 | 1.52 | n/a |
| Turnout | | 26,759 | 45.84 | n/a |
| Registered electors | | 58,377 | | |
| Independent gain from Independent | | | | |

=== Mōhaka general ward ===
2025 Mōhaka general ward election
| Party | Candidate | Votes | % | ±% |
|---|---|---|---|---|
| CARE for Hastings | Derek Nowell-Usticke | 713 | 37.55 | (new) |
| Independent | Pagen Goldstone | 610 | 32.12 | (new) |
| Independent | Kirsty Scott-McLean | 518 | 27.28 | (new) |
| Informal votes | | 2 | 0.11 | n/a |
| Blank votes | | 56 | 2.95 | n/a |
| Turnout | | 1,899 | 47.79 | n/a |
| Registered electors | | 3,974 | | |
| CARE for Hastings gain from Independent | | | | |

=== Heretaunga general ward ===
2025 Heretaunga general ward election (Note: Note that the stated affiliation change is from the 2022 result. Therefore, incumbents that had been elected at by-elections may show a change in affiliation even if re-elected.)
| Party | Candidate | Votes | % | ±% |
|---|---|---|---|---|
| Independent | Alwyn Corban^{†} | elected unopposed | | |
| Independent | Hana Montaperto-Hendry^{†} | elected unopposed | | |
| Registered electors | | 7,294 | | |
| Independent hold | | | | |
| Independent gain from Independent | | | | |
^{†} incumbent

=== Hastings-Havelock North general ward ===
2025 Hastings-Havelock North general ward election
| Party | Candidate | Votes | % | ±% |
|---|---|---|---|---|
| Independent | Steve Gibson | 7,618 | 53.73 | (new) |
| Independent | Michael Fowler^{†} | 6,699 | 47.25 | −9.54 |
| Independent | Yvonne Lorkin | 6,560 | 46.27 | (new) |
| Independent | Kevin Watkins^{†} | 6,025 | 42.50 | −10.43 |
| Independent | Callum Ross | 5,384 | 37.98 | (new) |
| Independent | Simon J H Nixon^{†} | 4,627 | 32.64 | −8.66 |
| Independent Green | Nick Ratcliffe | 4,550 | 32.09 | (new) |
| Independent | Rizwaana (Riz) Latiff | 4,534 | 31.98 | +0.80 |
| Independent | Gareth (Gus) Freeman | 4,394 | 30.99 | (new) |
| Independent | Lucie-Jane McElwee | 4,120 | 29.06 | (new) |
| CARE for Hastings | Jacqueline Supra | 3,786 | 26.71 | (new) |
| Independent | Darrin Wilson | 3,579 | 25.25 | (new) |
| Independent | Bernard Hickey | 3,237 | 22.83 | (new) |
| Independent | Rion Roben | 2,909 | 20.52 | −2.10 |
| Independent | John Bennett | 2,824 | 19.92 | (new) |
| Independent | Debbie Ward | 2,373 | 16.74 | (new) |
| Independent | Sayeed Ahmed | 2,083 | 14.69 | −4.33 |
| Informal votes | | 27 | 0.19 | −0.02 |
| Blank votes | | 224 | 1.58 | +1.09 |
| Turnout | | 14,177 | 47.37 | +9.04 |
| Registered electors | | 29,929 | | |
| Independent gain from Independent | | | | |
| Independent hold | | | | |
| Independent gain from Independent | | | | |
| Independent hold | | | | |
| Independent gain from Independent | | | | |
| Independent hold | | | | |
| Independent Green gain from Independent | | | | |
^{†} incumbent

=== Flaxmere general ward ===
2025 Flaxmere general ward election
| Party | Candidate | Votes | % | ±% |
|---|---|---|---|---|
| Independent | Henare O'Keefe | 682 | 54.17 | (new) |
| Independent | Henry Heke^{†} | 544 | 43.21 | +2.95 |
| Informal votes | | 2 | 0.16 | −0.59 |
| Blank votes | | 31 | 2.46 | +0.21 |
| Turnout | | 1,259 | 30.93 | +8.35 |
| Registered electors | | 4,071 | | |
| Independent gain from Independent | | | | |
^{†} incumbent

=== Kahurānaki general ward ===
2025 Kahurānaki general ward election
| Party | Candidate | Votes | % | ±% |
|---|---|---|---|---|
| Independent | Elisha Milmine | elected unopposed | | |
| Registered electors | | 3,902 | | |
| Independent gain from Independent | | | | |

=== Takitimu Māori ward ===
2025 Takitimu Māori ward election
| Party | Candidate | Votes | % | ±% |
|---|---|---|---|---|
| Independent | Heather Te Au-Skipworth^{†} | 2,580 | 73.71 | (new) |
| Independent | Kellie Jessup^{†} | 1,882 | 53.77 | +5.30 |
| Independent | Siiam Daniel | 1,182 | 33.77 | (new) |
| Independent | Sarah Greening | 1,161 | 33.17 | +5.81 |
| Independent | Bevan O'Connor | 1,089 | 31.11 | (new) |
| Informal votes | | 1 | 0.03 | +0.03 |
| Blank votes | | 40 | 1.14 | +1.14 |
| Turnout | | 3,500 | 38.01 | +18.90 |
| Registered electors | | 9,207 | | |
| Independent gain from Independent | | | | |
| Independent hold | | | | |
| Independent gain from Independent | | | | |
^{†} incumbent

=== Referendum on Māori wards ===
| Choice | Votes | % |
|---|---|---|
| I vote to REMOVE Māori wards | 13,327 | 52.17 |
| I vote to KEEP Māori wards | 12,216 | 47.83 |
| Total | 25,543 | 100.00 |
| Valid votes | 25,543 | 95.46 |
| Invalid votes | 5 | 0.02 |
| Blank votes | 1,211 | 4.53 |
| Total votes | 26,759 | 100.00 |
| Registered voters/turnout | 58,377 | 45.84 |
Source: electionz.com & MCERT

== Napier City Council ==
2025 Napier City Council election
- 11 October 2025
- Turnout: 21,325 (46.08% ▲5.94 pp)
- Mayor
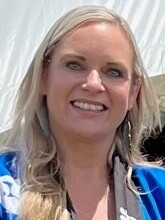
| | Ind | | Ind |
| Candidate | Richard McGrath | Kirsten Wise | Nigel Simpson |
| Party | Independent | Independent | Independent |
| Popular vote | 10,185 | 6,763 | 3,989 |
| Percentage | 47.76% | 31.71% | 18.71% |
Mayor before election
Kirsten Wise
Independent
Elected mayor
Richard McGrath
Independent
- Councillors
- 11 seats on the governing body of Napier City Council; 6 seats needed for a majority
| Party | Seats | +/– |
|---|---|---|
| Independent | 11 | +1 |
This lists parties that won seats. See the complete results below.
| Control before | Control after |
|---|---|
| No majority | No majority |

=== 2025 Napier mayoral election ===
2025 Napier mayoral election
| Party | Candidate | Votes | % | ±% |
|---|---|---|---|---|
| Independent | Richard McGrath | 10,185 | 47.76 | (new) |
| Independent | Kirsten Wise^{†} | 6,763 | 31.71 | −20.10 |
| Independent | Nigel Simpson | 3,989 | 18.71 | −21.75 |
| Informal votes | | 12 | 0.06 | −0.02 |
| Blank votes | | 376 | 1.76 | −0.48 |
| Turnout | | 21,325 | 46.08 | +5.94 |
| Registered electors | | 46,278 | | |
| Independent gain from Independent | | | | |
^{†} incumbent

=== Ahuriri general ward ===
2025 Ahuriri general ward election
| Party | Candidate | Votes | % | ±% |
|---|---|---|---|---|
| Independent | Roger Brownlie | 3,547 | 46.99 | (new) |
| Independent | Keith Price | 2,946 | 39.03 | (new) |
| Independent | Sally Crown | 2,584 | 34.23 | (new) |
| ACT Local | Ian Bradley | 2,325 | 30.80 | (new) |
| Independent | Louise Burnside | 1,980 | 26.23 | (new) |
| Independent | Karl Goodchild | 1,805 | 23.91 | (new) |
| Independent | Lyndal Johansson | 1,764 | 23.37 | (new) |
| Independent | Juliet Greig | 1,510 | 20.00 | (new) |
| Independent | Benita Newport | 1,158 | 15.34 | (new) |
| Informal votes | | 9 | 0.12 | n/a |
| Blank votes | | 118 | 1.56 | n/a |
| Turnout | | 7,549 | 53.52 | n/a |
| Registered electors | | 14,104 | | |
| Independent win (new seat) | | | | |
| Independent win (new seat) | | | | |
| Independent win (new seat) | | | | |

=== Napier Central general ward ===
2025 Napier Central general ward election
| Party | Candidate | Votes | % | ±% |
|---|---|---|---|---|
| Independent | Richard McGrath (withdrawn, elected mayor) | 3,685 | 71.78 | (new) |
| Independent | Greg 'Grego' Mawson | 3,038 | 59.17 | (new) |
| Independent | Craig Morley | 2,342 | 45.62 | (new) |
| Independent | Te Kira Lawrence | 1,983 | 38.62 | (new) |
| Independent | Lepaio Taiatini | 1,370 | 26.68 | (new) |
| Informal votes | | 2 | 0.04 | n/a |
| Blank votes | | 85 | 1.66 | n/a |
| Turnout | | 5,134 | 38.30 | n/a |
| Registered electors | | 13,404 | | |
| Independent win (new seat) | | | | |
| Independent win (new seat) | | | | |
| Independent win (new seat) | | | | |

=== Taradale general ward ===
2025 Taradale general ward election
| Party | Candidate | Votes | % | ±% |
|---|---|---|---|---|
| Independent | Graeme Taylor^{†} | 4,560 | 64.22 | −5.18 |
| Independent | Ronda Chrystal^{†} | 4,311 | 60.71 | +0.57 |
| Independent | Nigel Simpson^{†} | 3,860 | 54.36 | −14.05 |
| Independent | Terry Cornish | 3,085 | 43.44 | (new) |
| Informal votes | | 1 | 0.01 | +0.00 |
| Blank votes | | 163 | 2.30 | +0.81 |
| Turnout | | 7,101 | 51.26 | +3.95 |
| Registered electors | | 13,852 | | |
| Independent hold | | | | |
| Independent hold | | | | |
| Independent hold | | | | |
^{†} incumbent

=== Te Whanga Māori ward ===
2025 Te Whanga Māori ward election
| Party | Candidate | Votes | % | ±% |
|---|---|---|---|---|
| Independent | Shyann Raihania | 1,049 | 68.07 | (new) |
| Independent | Whare Isaac-Sharland | 764 | 49.58 | (new) |
| Independent | Kirk Kia-maia Leonard | 566 | 36.73 | (new) |
| Informal votes | | 0 | 0.00 | n/a |
| Blank votes | | 45 | 2.92 | n/a |
| Turnout | | 1,541 | 31.33 | n/a |
| Registered electors | | 4,918 | | |
| Independent win (new seat) | | | | |
| Independent win (new seat) | | | | |

=== Referendum on Māori wards ===
| Choice | Votes | % |
|---|---|---|
| I vote to REMOVE Māori wards | 11,656 | 56.86 |
| I vote to KEEP Māori wards | 8,844 | 43.14 |
| Total | 20,500 | 100.00 |
| Valid votes | 20,500 | 96.13 |
| Invalid votes | 3 | 0.01 |
| Blank votes | 822 | 3.85 |
| Total votes | 21,325 | 100.00 |
| Registered voters/turnout | 46,278 | 46.08 |
Source: electionz.com & MCERT

== Central Hawke's Bay District Council ==
2025 Central Hawke's Bay District Council election
- 11 October 2025
- Turnout: 6,134 (56.39% ▲12.08 pp)
- Mayor
| | Ind | Ind |
| Candidate | Will Foley | Alex Walker |
| Party | Independent | Independent |
| Popular vote | 3,854 | 2,209 |
| Percentage | 62.83% | 36.01% |
Mayor before election
Alex Walker
Independent
Elected mayor
Will Foley
Independent
- Councillors
- 9 seats on the governing body of Central Hawke's Bay District Council; 5 seats needed for a majority
| Party | Seats | +/– |
|---|---|---|
| Independent | 9 | 0 |
This lists parties that won seats. See the complete results below.
| Control before | Control after |
|---|---|
| No majority | No majority |

=== 2025 Central Hawke's Bay mayoral election ===
2025 Mayor of Central Hawke's Bay election
| Party | Candidate | Votes | % | ±% |
|---|---|---|---|---|
| Independent | Will Foley | 3,854 | 62.83 | (new) |
| Independent | Alex Walker^{†} | 2,209 | 36.01 | n/a |
| Informal votes | | 0 | 0.00 | n/a |
| Blank votes | | 71 | 1.16 | n/a |
| Turnout | | 6,134 | 56.39 | n/a |
| Registered electors | | 10,878 | | |
| Independent gain from Independent | | | | |
^{†} incumbent

=== At-large ward ===
2025 Central Hawke's Bay at-large ward election
| Party | Candidate | Votes | % | ±% |
|---|---|---|---|---|
| Independent | Gerard Minehan | 4,071 | 66.37 | (new) |
| Independent | Kelly Annand | 2,970 | 48.42 | (new) |
| Independent | Meg Gordon | 1,895 | 30.89 | (new) |
| Independent | Stella McDonald | 1,368 | 22.30 | (new) |
| Informal votes | | 10 | 0.16 | n/a |
| Blank votes | | 209 | 3.41 | n/a |
| Turnout | | 6,134 | 56.39 | n/a |
| Registered electors | | 10,878 | | |
| Independent win (new seat) | | | | |
| Independent win (new seat) | | | | |

=== Aramoana-Ruahine general ward ===
2025 Aramoana-Ruahine general ward election
| Party | Candidate | Votes | % | ±% |
|---|---|---|---|---|
| Independent | Jerry Greer^{†} | 1,730 | 61.02 | n/a |
| Independent | Brent Muggeridge^{†} | 1,607 | 56.68 | n/a |
| Independent | Kate Taylor^{†} | 1,489 | 52.52 | n/a |
| Independent | Simon F.H. Collin | 1,477 | 52.10 | (new) |
| Informal votes | | 0 | 0.00 | n/a |
| Blank votes | | 89 | 3.14 | n/a |
| Turnout | | 2,835 | 59.04 | n/a |
| Registered electors | | 4,802 | | |
| Independent hold | | | | |
| Independent hold | | | | |
| Independent hold | | | | |
^{†} incumbent

=== Ruataniwha general ward ===
2025 Ruataniwha general ward election
| Party | Candidate | Votes | % | ±% |
|---|---|---|---|---|
| Independent | Todd Chote | 1,743 | 62.59 | (new) |
| Independent | Pip Burne^{†} | 1,485 | 53.32 | −28.79 |
| Independent | Kirsty Lawrence | 1,131 | 40.61 | (new) |
| Independent | Tim Gilbertson | 903 | 32.42 | (new) |
| Independent | Graham Stubbs | 808 | 29.01 | (new) |
| Independent | Murray Kenderdine | 536 | 19.25 | (new) |
| Independent | Jenny Nelson-Smith | 488 | 17.52 | (new) |
| Independent | Ben Revell | 160 | 5.75 | (new) |
| Informal votes | | 1 | 0.04 | +0.03 |
| Blank votes | | 52 | 1.87 | +1.85 |
| Turnout | | 2,785 | 57.97 | +13.66 |
| Registered electors | | 4,804 | | |
| Independent gain from Independent | | | | |
| Independent hold | | | | |
| Independent gain from Independent | | | | |
^{†} incumbent

=== Rautahi Māori ward ===
2025 Rautahi Māori ward election
| Party | Candidate | Votes | % | ±% |
|---|---|---|---|---|
| Independent | Amiria Nepe Apatu | 333 | 64.79 | (new) |
| Independent | Te Ata Kura Huata | 160 | 31.13 | (new) |
| Informal votes | | 1 | 0.19 | n/a |
| Blank votes | | 20 | 3.89 | n/a |
| Turnout | | 514 | 40.41 | n/a |
| Registered electors | | 1,272 | | |
| Independent win (new seat) | | | | |

=== Referendum on Māori wards ===
| Choice | Votes | % |
|---|---|---|
| I vote to REMOVE Māori wards | 3,502 | 59.63 |
| I vote to KEEP Māori wards | 2,371 | 40.37 |
| Total | 5,873 | 100.00 |
| Valid votes | 5,873 | 95.75 |
| Invalid votes | 1 | 0.02 |
| Blank votes | 260 | 4.24 |
| Total votes | 6,134 | 100.00 |
| Registered voters/turnout | 10,878 | 56.39 |
Source: electionz.com & MCERT

== See also ==
- 2025 Hawke's Bay Regional Council election
