= Mabel Gunn =

New Zealand nurse and hospital matron

Mabel Winifred Gunn MBE (1 June 1890 – 7 January 1970) was a New Zealand district nurse and hospital matron. She was born in Moorlinch, Somerset, England, on 1 June 1890. She did her nursing training at Guys Hospital.

Gunn worked at Waihi Hospital and St Helens in Christchurch. She retired from Whataroa Hospital in 1964 after 43 years working in South Westland.

In the 1960 Queen's Birthday Honours, Gunn was appointed a Member of the Order of the British Empire, in recognition of her services as matron of Whataroa Hospital.
