= 2025 Hawke's Bay Regional Council election =

Elections in New Zealand

- 11 October 2025
- Turnout: 53,561 (49.01% ▲9.85 pp)
- 11 seats on the governing body of Hawke's Bay Regional Council; 6 seats needed for a majority
Party	Seats	+/–
Independent	11	0
This lists parties that won seats. See the complete results below.
Control before	Control after
No majority	No majority

Chair election
- 29 October 2025

6 of 11 votes needed for majority
	Ind
Candidate	Sophie Siers
Party	Independent
Electoral vote	Unopposed
Chair before election
Hinewai Ormsby
Independent
Elected Chair
Sophie Siers
Independent

The 2025 Hawke's Bay Regional Council election was a local election held from 9 September to 11 October in the Hawke's Bay region of New Zealand, as part of that year's regional council elections and other local elections held nation-wide. Postal voting and the first-past-the-post voting system were used.

The Hawke's Bay Regional Council is made up of 11 councillors elected from 7 constituencies: Ahuriri/Napier (three councillors), Heretaunga/Hastings (three councillors), Wairoa, Ngaruroro, Tamatea/Central Hawke's Bay and two Māori constituencies (Māui ki te Raki and Māui ki te Tonga).

== Key dates ==
- 4 July 2025: Nominations for candidates opened.
- 1 August 2025: Nominations for candidates closed at 12pm.
- 6 August 2025: Candidates announced.
- 9 September 2025: Voting documents were posted and voting opened.
- 11 October 2025: Voting closed at 12pm and preliminary results released.
- 16 October 2025: Final results will be declared.

== Background ==
=== Referendum ===
In October 2021, the Hawke's Bay Regional Council voted to create two Māori constituencies for the 2022 & 2025 elections.

In July 2024, the National-led coalition government passed the Local Government (Electoral Legislation and Māori Wards and Māori Constituencies) Amendment Act 2024 which reinstated the requirement that councils must hold a referendum before establishing Māori wards or constituencies. The council then voted unanimously in August 2024 to affirm their decision to establish the Māori constituencies, thereby triggering a referendum on the constituencies to be held alongside the 2025 local elections.

== Campaign ==
=== Referendum ===
A group called For Wards Hawke’s Bay formed to support the pro-ward position at the referendums in the wider Hawke's Bay region. The group held a meeting on 23 July in Clive chaired by regional council chair Rex Graham, with various speakers including local Presbyterian minister Jill McDonald, Hastings Māori ward councillor Heather Te Au-Skipworth, HB Multicultural Society president Rizwaana Latiff and Hayley Whittaker from the Public Service Association.

== List of candidates ==
=== Incumbents not seeking re-election ===
- Will Foley, incumbent deputy chair and second-term councillor for the Tamatea/Central Hawke's Bay constituency
- Xan Harding, incumbent councillor for the Heretaunga/Hastings constituency
- Charles Lambert, incumbent councillor for the Māui Ki Te Raki Māori constituency
- Martin Williams, incumbent councillor for the Ahuriri/Napier constituency

As of February, deputy chair Will Foley (Tamatea/Central Hawke's Bay), Xan Harding (Heretaunga/Hastings), and Di Roadley (Wairoa) had not decided if they would run again.

Hawke's Bay Today reported on 31 May that Foley would run for mayor of Central Hawke's Bay against incumbent Alex Walker, Foley saying his time on the regional council was up.

=== Councillors ===
==== Ahuriri/Napier general constituency ====
The Ahuriri/Napier general constituency returned three councillors to the regional council.

Candidate	Affiliation (Note: A candidate may leave their affiliation blank, run as an independent, or run with an affiliation to an organisation, local body ticket or political party. Hawke's Bay Regional Council does not allow whānau, hapū, or iwi details to be used for the affiliation.)	Notes
Paul Bailey	Independent	Former regional councillor
Hayley Browne	None	Incumbent Napier city councillor
Syed Khurram Iqbal	None	Chartered engineer
Neil Kirton	None	Incumbent councillor
Hinewai Ormsby	SAFER waterways. STRONGER communities.	Incumbent chairperson
Louise Parsons	Independent	

==== Heretaunga/Hastings general constituency ====
The Heretaunga/Hastings general constituency returned three councillors to the regional council.

Candidate	Affiliation	Notes
Bruce Mackay	None	
Jock Mackintosh	None	Incumbent councillor
Sophie Siers	None	Incumbent councillor
Conrad Waitoa	None	

==== Wairoa general constituency ====
The Wairoa general constituency returned one councillor to the regional council.

Candidate	Affiliation	Notes
Kiri Rangirangi-Hamlin	None	
Di Roadley	None	Incumbent councillor

==== Ngaruroro general constituency ====
The Ngaruroro general constituency returned one councillor to the regional council.

Candidate	Affiliation	Notes
Marcus Ormond	None	Farmer
Jerf van Beek	None	Incumbent councillor

==== Tamatea/Central Hawke's Bay general constituency ====
The Tamatea/Central Hawke's Bay general constituency returned one councillor to the regional council.

Candidate	Affiliation	Notes
Tim Aitken	None	Incumbent councillor for the Central Hawke's Bay District Council
Tony Kuklinski	Independent	
Keri Ropiha	None	

==== Māui ki te Tonga Māori constituency ====
The Māui ki te Tonga Māori constituency returned one councillor to the regional council.

Candidate	Affiliation	Notes
Thompson Hokianga	None	Incumbent councillor

As the only candidate, Hokianga was elected unopposed.

==== Māui ki te Raki Māori constituency ====
The Māui ki te Raki Māori constituency returned one councillor to the regional council.

Candidate	Affiliation	Notes
Michelle McIlroy	None	
Shelton White	None	

== Results ==
=== Wairoa general constituency ===
Wairoa general constituency
Affiliation	Candidate	Votes	%	+/−
Independent	Di Roadley	1,143	62.49	−1.33
Independent	Kiri Rangirangi-Hamlin	532	29.09	(new)
Informal		2	0.11	+0.11
Blank		152	8.31	−1.57
Turnout		1,829	(58.92)	(+1.06)
Registered		3,104		
Independent hold				
incumbent

=== Ahuriri/Napier general constituency ===
Ahuriri/Napier general constituency
Affiliation	Candidate	Votes	%	+/−
Independent	Neil Kirton	10,820	54.78	−14.68
Independent	Louise Parsons	9,287	47.02	(new)
Independent	Hinewai Ormsby	8,676	43.92	−8.90
Independent	Hayley Browne	8,077	40.89	(new)
Independent	Paul Bailey	5,744	29.08	(new)
Independent	Syed Iqbal	4,763	24.11	(new)
Informal		17	0.09	+0.06
Blank		617	3.12	+0.57
Turnout		19,752	(47.80)	(+5.10)
Registered		41,326		
Independent hold				
Independent gain from Independent				
Independent hold				
incumbent

=== Heretaunga/Hastings general constituency ===
Heretaunga/Hastings general constituency
Affiliation	Candidate	Votes	%	+/−
Independent	Jock Mackintosh	9,534	60.08	+0.34
Independent	Sophie Siers	9,507	59.91	+3.88
Independent	Conrad Waitoa	7,459	47.00	(new)
Independent	Bruce Mackay	6,600	41.59	(new)
Informal		3	0.02	−0.12
Blank		1,376	8.67	+4.84
Turnout		15,869	(45.36)	(+9.15)
Registered		34,983		
Independent hold				
Independent hold				
Independent gain from Independent				
incumbent

=== Ngāruroro general constituency ===
Ngāruroro general constituency
Affiliation	Candidate	Votes	%	+/−
Independent	Jerf van Beek	4,370	59.46	n/a
Independent	Marcus Ormond	2,579	35.09	(new)
Informal		0	0.00	n/a
Blank		411	5.59	n/a
Turnout		7,360	(51.90)	n/a
Registered		14,180		
Independent hold				
incumbent

=== Tamatea/Central Hawke's Bay general constituency ===
Tamatea/Central Hawke's Bay general constituency
Affiliation	Candidate	Votes	%	+/−
Independent	Tony Kuklinski	2,197	39.18	(new)
Independent	Tim Aitken	2,189	39.04	(new)
Independent	Keri Ropiha	891	15.89	(new)
Informal		26	0.46	n/a
Blank		304	5.42	n/a
Turnout		5,607	(58.45)	n/a
Registered		9,593		
Independent gain from Independent				

=== Māui ki te Raki Māori constituency ===
Māui ki te Raki Māori constituency
Affiliation	Candidate	Votes	%	+/−
Independent	Michelle McIlroy	1,898	60.72	+19.28
Independent	Shelton White	1,032	33.01	(new)
Informal		0	0.00	−0.11
Blank		196	6.27	−2.24
Turnout		3,126	(51.20)	+25.77
Registered		6,105		
Independent gain from Independent				

=== Māui ki te Tonga Māori constituency ===
Māui ki te Raki Māori constituency
Affiliation	Candidate	Votes
Independent	Thompson Hokianga	Unopposed
Registered		9,928
Independent hold		
incumbent

=== Referendum on Māori constituencies ===
Referendum on Māori constituencies
Choice	Votes	%
I vote to REMOVE Māori constituencies	31,539	48.02
I vote to KEEP Māori constituencies	30,878	47.01
Informal	38	0.06
Blank	3,226	4.91
Turnout	65,681	(48.59)
Registered	135,165	
Result:	Māori constituencies to be abolished at next election.	

== See also ==
- Results of the 2025 New Zealand territorial authority elections in Hawke's Bay
- 2025 Napier City Council election
- 2025 Hastings District Council election
