= 2025 Napier City Council election =

Elections in New Zealand

- 11 October 2025
- Turnout: 21,325 (46.08% ▲5.94 pp)
- Mayor
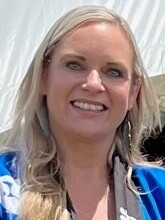
	Ind		Ind
Candidate	Richard McGrath	Kirsten Wise	Nigel Simpson
Party	Independent	Independent	Independent
Popular vote	10,185	6,763	3,989
Percentage	47.76%	31.71%	18.71%
Mayor before election
Kirsten Wise
Independent
Elected mayor
Richard McGrath
Independent
- Councillors
- 11 seats on the governing body of Napier City Council; 6 seats needed for a majority
Party	Seats	+/–
Independent	11	+1
This lists parties that won seats. See the complete results below.

The 2025 Napier City Council election was a local election held from 9 September to 11 October in Napier, New Zealand, as part of that year's territorial authority elections and other local elections held nation-wide.

Voters elected the mayor of Napier and 11 city councillors for the 2025–2028 term of the Napier City Council. Postal voting and the first-past-the-post voting system were used.

Councillor Richard McGrath won the mayoralty, defeating incumbent mayor Kirsten Wise.

In the prior term, the council had voted to introduce a Māori ward for this election; in a referendum on its future held at this election (as part of a nation-wide series of referendums) voters elected to remove the Māori ward for future elections.

== Key dates ==
- 4 July 2025: Nominations for candidates opened
- 1 August 2025: Nominations for candidates closed at 12 pm
- 9 September 2025: Voting documents were posted and voting opened
- 11 October 2025: Voting closed at 12 pm and progress/preliminary results were published
- 16–19 October 2025: Final results were declared.

== Background ==
=== Positions up for election ===
Voters elected the mayor of Napier and 12 councillors from 4 wards. They also elected 4 members of the Hawke's Bay Regional Council. (Note: 3 representing the city exclusively.; 1 representing the wider region from a Māori constituency.)

== Campaign ==
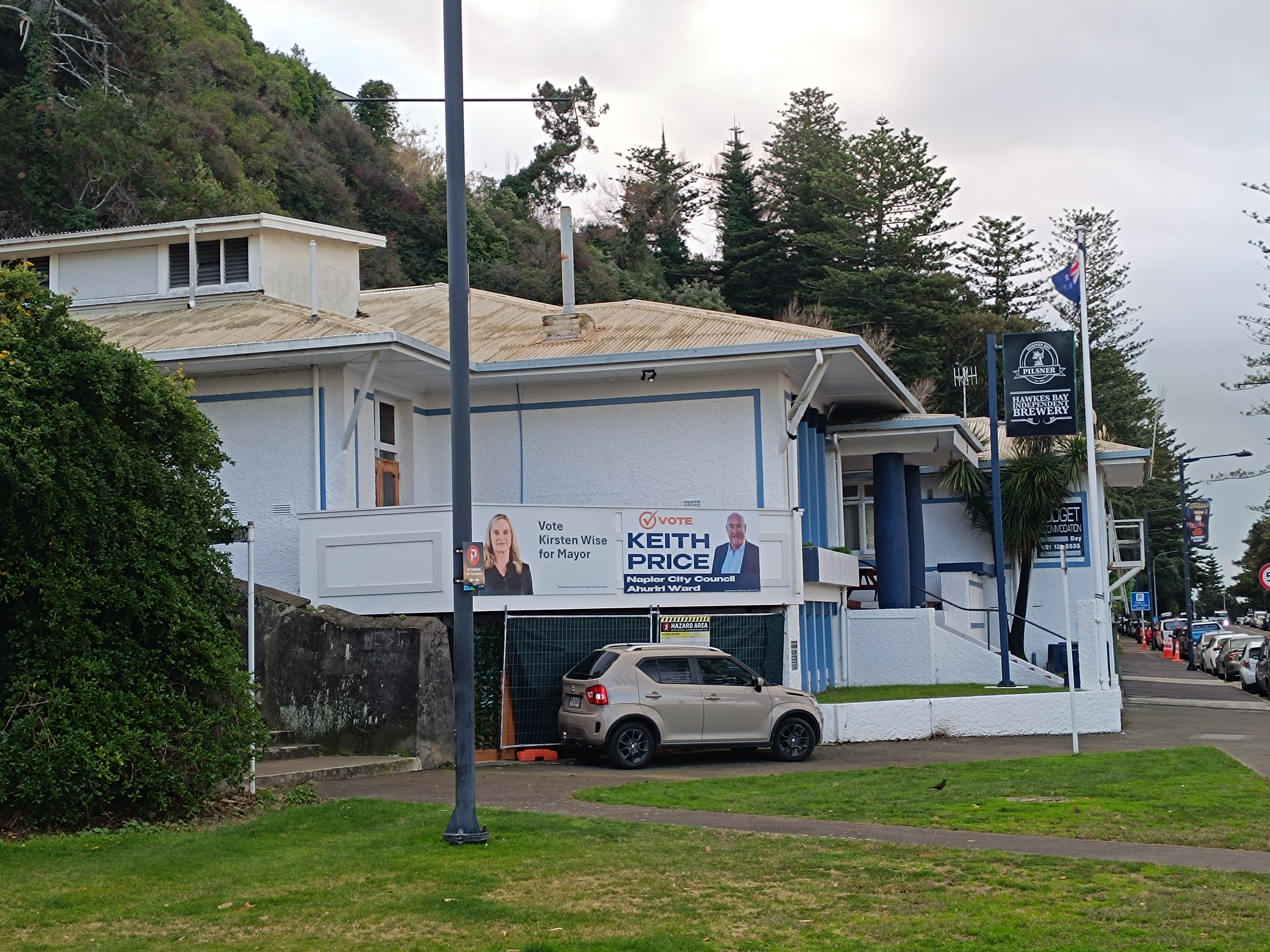
Advertisements seen along Marine Parade

=== Māori wards referendum ===
A group called For Wards Hawke's Bay formed to support the pro-ward position at the referendums in the wider Hawke's Bay region. The group held a meeting on 23 July in Clive chaired by regional council chair Rex Graham, with various speakers including local Presbyterian minister Jill McDonald, Hastings Māori ward councillor Heather Te Au-Skipworth, HB Multicultural Society president Rizwaana Latiff and Hayley Whittaker from the Public Service Association.

Hawke's Bay Today asked the mayoral candidates whether they supported the group; mayor Wise said she had been working closely with them, Richard McGrath said he had no opinion on the group, and Nigel Simpson said he was not familiar with the group and that he was against Māori wards.

=== Incumbents not seeking re-election ===
- Maxine Boag, councillor since 2007
- Annette Brosnan, incumbent deputy mayor and fourth-term councillor
- Hayley Browne, councillor since 2019, instead ran for a seat on the Hawke's Bay Regional Council
- Chad Tareha, first-term councillor for the Taradale ward

== Results ==
=== Composition summary ===
Ward	2022		Elected	
Mayor	Independent	Kirsten Wise	Independent	Richard McGrath
Ahuriri (old)	Independent	Hayley Brown	seat abolished	
Ahuriri (old)	Independent	Keith Price	seat abolished	
Onekawa/Tamatea	Working Together	Richard McGrath	seat abolished	
Onekawa/Tamatea	Working Together	Annette Brosnan	seat abolished	
Nelson Park	Independent	Greg Mawson	seat abolished	
Nelson Park	Independent	Maxine Boag	seat abolished	
Nelson Park	Independent	Sally Crown	seat abolished	
Nelson Park	Independent	Juliet Greig	seat abolished	
Taradale	Independent	Graeme Taylor	Independent	Graeme Taylor
Taradale	Independent	Nigel Simpson	Independent	Nigel Simpson
Taradale	Independent	Ronda Chrystal	Independent	Ronda Chrystal
Taradale	Independent	Chad Tareha	seat abolished	
Ahuriri (new)	new seat		Independent	Roger Brownlie
Ahuriri (new)	new seat		Independent	Keith Price
Ahuriri (new)	new seat		Independent	Sally Crown
Napier Central	new seat		Independent	Greg Mawson
Napier Central	new seat		Independent	Craig Morley
Napier Central	new seat		Independent	Te Kira Lawrence
Te Whanga	new seat		Independent	Shyann Raihania
Te Whanga	new seat		Independent	Whare Isaac-Sharland
^{R} did not run for re-election

=== Mayor ===
Councillor Richard McGrath won the mayoralty, defeating incumbent mayor Kirsten Wise.

Candidate	Affiliation (Note: A candidate may leave their affiliation blank, run as an independent, or run with an affiliation to an organisation, local body ticket or political party. Napier City Council does not allow whānau, hapū, or iwi details to be used for the affiliation.)	Notes
Richard McGrath	Commonsense change, needs before wants	Councillor since 2014. Also ran for re-election as a councillor for the Napier Central general ward.
Nigel Simpson	Independent	Councillor since 2019, stood for the mayoralty in 2022 and lost to Wise. Also ran for re-election as a councillor for the Taradale general ward.
Kirsten Wise	Independent	Incumbent mayor since 2019

2025 Napier mayoral election
Party	Candidate	Votes	%	±%
Independent	Richard McGrath	10,185	47.76	(new)
Independent	Kirsten Wise^{†}	6,763	31.71	−20.10
Independent	Nigel Simpson	3,989	18.71	−21.75
Informal votes		12	0.06	−0.02
Blank votes		376	1.76	−0.48
Turnout		21,325	46.08	+5.94
Registered electors		46,278		
Independent gain from Independent				
^{†} incumbent

==== Ahuriri General Ward ====
Ahuriri general ward returned three councillors to the city council.

Candidate	Affiliation	Notes
Iain Bradley	ACT Local	
Roger Brownlie	Independent	Retailer and orchardist
Louise Burnside	Independent	
Sally Crown	Experienced, Strong, Grounded	Incumbent councillor since 2019
Karl Goodchild	Lower Rates	Previously ran for council in 2022
Juliet Greig	None	Incumbent councillor since 2022
Lyndal Johansson	Independent, fresh voice	
Ben Newport	Independent	
Keith Price	Independent	Incumbent councillor since 2010

2025 Ahuriri general ward election
Party	Candidate	Votes	%	±%
Independent	Roger Brownlie	3,547	46.99	(new)
Independent	Keith Price	2,946	39.03	(new)
Independent	Sally Crown	2,584	34.23	(new)
ACT Local	Ian Bradley	2,325	30.80	(new)
Independent	Louise Burnside	1,980	26.23	(new)
Independent	Karl Goodchild	1,805	23.91	(new)
Independent	Lyndal Johansson	1,764	23.37	(new)
Independent	Juliet Greig	1,510	20.00	(new)
Independent	Benita Newport	1,158	15.34	(new)
Informal votes		9	0.12	n/a
Blank votes		118	1.56	n/a
Turnout		7,549	53.52	n/a
Registered electors		14,104		
Independent win (new seat)				
Independent win (new seat)				
Independent win (new seat)				

==== Napier Central general Ward ====
Napier Central general ward returned three councillors to the city council.

Candidate	Affiliation	Notes
Te Kira Lawrence	Independent	Previously ran for council in 2022
Taiatini Lepaio	Independent	
Greg 'Grego' Mawson	Working with you, for you	Incumbent councillor since 2019
Richard McGrath	Your Community Representative	Incumbent councillor since 2014. Also ran for mayor.
Craig Morley	Get back to basics	

2025 Napier Central general ward election
Party	Candidate	Votes	%	±%
Independent	Richard McGrath (withdrawn, elected mayor)	3,685	71.78	(new)
Independent	Greg 'Grego' Mawson	3,038	59.17	(new)
Independent	Craig Morley	2,342	45.62	(new)
Independent	Te Kira Lawrence	1,983	38.62	(new)
Independent	Lepaio Taiatini	1,370	26.68	(new)
Informal votes		2	0.04	n/a
Blank votes		85	1.66	n/a
Turnout		5,134	38.30	n/a
Registered electors		13,404		
Independent win (new seat)				
Independent win (new seat)				
Independent win (new seat)				

==== Taradale general ward ====
Taradale general ward returned three councillors to the city council.

Candidate	Affiliation	Notes
Ronda Chrystal	Independent	Incumbent councillor since 2019
Terry Cornish	None	Semi-retired businessman
Nigel Simpson	Independent	Incumbent councillor since 2019. Also ran for mayor.
Graeme Taylor	Independent	Incumbent councillor since 2010

2025 Taradale general ward election
Party	Candidate	Votes	%	±%
Independent	Graeme Taylor^{†}	4,560	64.22	−5.18
Independent	Ronda Chrystal^{†}	4,311	60.71	+0.57
Independent	Nigel Simpson^{†}	3,860	54.36	−14.05
Independent	Terry Cornish	3,085	43.44	(new)
Informal votes		1	0.01	+0.00
Blank votes		163	2.30	+0.81
Turnout		7,101	51.26	+3.95
Registered electors		13,852		
Independent hold				
Independent hold				
Independent hold				
^{†} incumbent

==== Te Whanga Māori Ward ====
Te Whanga Māori ward returned two councillors to the city council.

Candidate	Affiliation	Notes
Whare Isaac-Sharland	None	
Kirk Kia-maia Leonard	None	
Shyann Raihania	None	

2025 Te Whanga Māori ward election
Party	Candidate	Votes	%	±%
Independent	Shyann Raihania	1,049	68.07	(new)
Independent	Whare Isaac-Sharland	764	49.58	(new)
Independent	Kirk Kia-maia Leonard	566	36.73	(new)
Informal votes		0	0.00	n/a
Blank votes		45	2.92	n/a
Turnout		1,541	31.33	n/a
Registered electors		4,918		
Independent win (new seat)				
Independent win (new seat)				

=== Referendum on Māori wards ===
Choice	Votes	%
I vote to REMOVE Māori wards	13,327	52.17
I vote to KEEP Māori wards	12,216	47.83
Total	25,543	100.00
Valid votes	25,543	95.46
Invalid votes	5	0.02
Blank votes	1,211	4.53
Total votes	26,759	100.00
Registered voters/turnout	58,377	45.84
Source: electionz.com & MCERT

== See also ==
- 2025 Hastings District Council election
