= Lewis Harris (philanthropist) =

New Zealand farmer, stock dealer and philanthropist

Sir Lewis Edward Harris OBE (25 March 1900 – 6 March 1983) was a New Zealand farmer, stock dealer and philanthropist. He was born in Woodville, New Zealand, on 25 March 1900.

In the 1960 Queen's Birthday Honours, Harris was appointed an Officer of the Order of the British Empire, for philanthropic and social welfare services, especially in the interests of disabled children. He was made a Knight Bachelor, for services to disabled people, in the 1979 Queen's Birthday Honours.
