= Godfrey Bowen =

New Zealand sheep shearer (1922–1994)

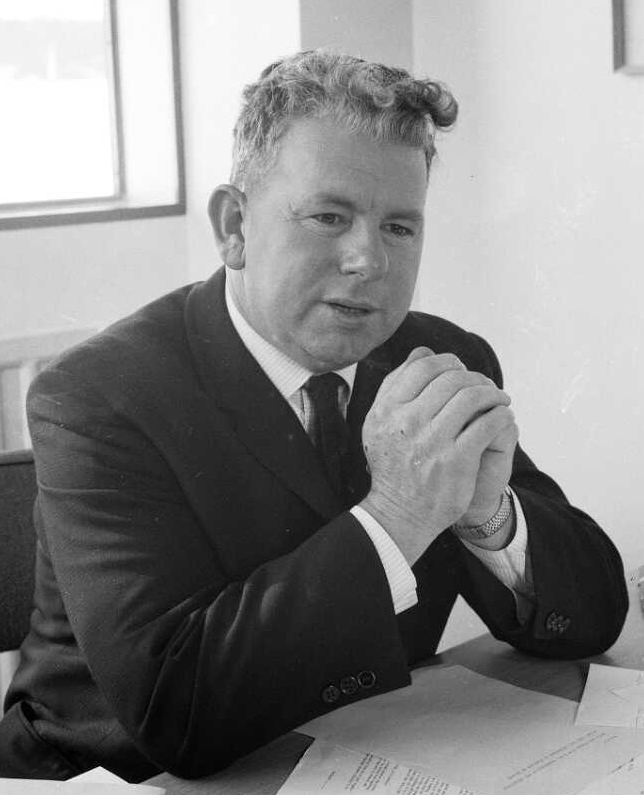
- Bowen after returning from the Soviet Union in August 1963

Walter Godfrey Bowen MBE (13 February 1922 – 2 January 1994) was a New Zealand farmer and world acclaimed sheep shearer. With his brother Ivan, he developed the Bowen Technique, which involved the shearer using his spare hand to stretch the sheep's skin, which improved the quality of the shorn fleece. They also introduced the idea of shearing sheep twice a year, which is now the usual practice in New Zealand.

Bowen set a world record in 1953 by shearing 456 sheep in nine hours.

Bowen, along with George Harford set up the Agrodome in Rotorua, which is still a popular tourist spot to this day. Tourists get to see a variety of sheep on display, see a sheep shorn and go on a tour of the farm.

In the 1960 Queen's Birthday Honours, Bowen was appointed a Member of the Order of the British Empire, and in 1990 he was an inaugural inductee into the New Zealand Sports Hall of Fame. Bowen was also awarded the Star of Lenin and Hero of Labour by Soviet first secretary Nikita Khrushchev for services to farming and shearing in 1963.

Bowen died in Rotorua of a heart attack in 1994. He was survived by his wife and four children. He was buried at Kauae Cemetery in Ngongotahā.
