= Charles Allan Marris =

New Zealand journalist and editor

- Born: 11 September 1876; Melbourne, Victoria, Australia
- Died: 30 June 1947 (aged 70); Porirua, New Zealand
- Occupations: journalist, editor, poet
- Years active: 1913–1946

Charles Allan Marris (11 September 1876 – 30 June 1947) was a New Zealand journalist and editor. As an editor, he "upheld Georgian poetic conventions and discouraged literary modernism", and encouraged the works of Robin Hyde. Marris had a long-standing feud with Denis Glover; in his 1937 satirical poem The Arraignment of Paris, Glover stated Marris was the "arbiter of all our art and letters / presenting rotten apples to his betters". Marris wrote a daily column under the alias Percy Flage in The Evening Post until 1946.

== Early life ==
Charles Allan Marris was born in Melbourne, Victoria, Australia, on 11 September 1876 to Charles Augustus Marris, a law clerk, and Agnes Reid Allan. In his early life, Charles was a schoolteacher in Ballarat and Ipswich. On 6 June 1900, Marris married Ethel Anderson Revitt; with Revitt, he moved to Wellington, and worked at Newtown School as a relieving teacher.

== Editor and journalist ==
Marris became a journalist for The Evening Post in 1913, where he worked as the paper's representative in the press gallery of the parliamentary. In 1914, he became an associate editor for The Sun, where he opened up its pages to local writers. Marris worked for the paper until 1924, published poems by Robin Hyde and A. R. D. Fairburn, and stated he discovered Eileen Duggan. In 1925, he became an editor, and later managing editor, of The New Zealand Times. After that paper merged with The Dominion, he was appointed as editor of the New Zealand Referee and Sporting Record.

Marris published a daily column in The Evening Post until 1946 as "Percy Flage". In 1928, Marris became the literary editor for Art in New Zealand, published by Harry Tombs, where he "ran a campaign against modernist incursions into New Zealand verse". He edited three issues of Rata, a Christmas annual which focused on artwork, poetry, fiction, and photographs, between 1931 and 1933, and edited an anthology entitled New Zealand Best Poems published by Tombs between 1932 and 1943. Due to his Georgian ideals, he was often in conflict with avant-garde poets who centralized around the Caxton Press and Denis Glover. Glover believed Marris represented an unhealthy and outdated literary establishment, with author Lawrence Jones citing Marris, John Schroder, and Alan Mulgan as representative of the enemy of Caxton Press writers. Marris and Glover had a long-standing feud that dated back to at least 1933, when Marris rejected a Glover poem submitted for New Zealand Best Poems. In the satirical poem The Arraignment of Paris, Glover stated Marris was the "arbiter of all our art and letters / presenting rotten apples to his betters". In response to the poem, Marris threatened to sue Glover.

From 1907 to 1911, Marris had over 24 pieces of poetry published in Sydney Bulletin's Red Page, with a piece published in Canterbury University College Review in 1931. Pieces were also published in New Zealand Artists’ Annual and in the New Zealand Railways Magazine. Marris served as President of the PEN New Zealand Centre from 1937 to 1938 and was a member thereof until his death. As an editor, Marris "upheld Georgian poetic conventions and discouraged literary modernism" and favoured authors such as J. C. Andersen, Duggan, Dora Hagemeyer, and Hyde. Marris encouraged Hyde, and arranged publication of her 1935 work The Conquerors and Other Poems.

Marris died on 30 June 1947 in Porirua. He had a daughter, and four sons.
