= Harry Tombs =

Printer, publisher, musician, artist, patron of the arts

- Tombs in 1934
- Born: 11 June 1874; Christchurch
- Died: 2 December 1966 (aged 92)
- Occupation(s): publisher, musician, artist

Harry Hugo Tombs OBE (11 June 1874 – 2 December 1966) was a New Zealand printer, publisher, musician, artist and patron of the arts. In the 1960 Queen's Birthday Honours, Tombs was appointed an Officer of the Order of the British Empire, for services to art and music.

== Biography ==
Harry Hugo Tombs was born on 11 June 1874 in Christchurch, New Zealand, to George Tombs, a printer, and Rosa Ann Hedgman. Harry attended Christchurch West School and the Christchurch Normal School, and attended Christ's College in 1889 and 1890. After his attendance at school, Tombs was an apprentice at his father's printing firm Whitcombe and Tombs; afterwards, he went to Leipzig, where he studied the piano and the violin. Later in South Africa, Tombs worked for Cape Argus. After he performed a season of Gilbert and Sullivan opera and studied art in England, Tombs went back to New Zealand around 1907, when he married Beatrice Atkinson. The couple had one child together, a son, named David.

After his return to New Zealand, Tombs became manager of Whitcombe and Tombs's Wellington branch. He purchased the monthly magazine Progress in 1910 after his firm took over printing of the magazine two years earlier. In 1915, Tombs established N.Z. Building Progress, a "mainstay" for the firm until 1924, when its publication ceased. Tombs established the first New Zealand fine arts press, though it was not the first fine arts journal published in New Zealand, which dates to 1880. Art in New Zealand, a quarterly, was printed from 1928–1944, and Rata, edited by Charles Allan Marris, went from 1931–1933. In addition to Art in New Zealand and Rata, he published Year Book of the Arts in New Zealand, New Zealand Best Poems, and Music in New Zealand, the last of which Vernon Griffiths edited. He continued to publish these fine arts journals despite poor sales.

Tombs orchestrated a showing of his paintings in 1928, which the Dictionary of New Zealand Biography described as "very successful". He regularly showed his paintings at the New Zealand Academy of Fine Arts, and, from 1935–1937, was a council member thereof. His book A Century of Art in Otago was published in 1948. When the Sheffield choir came to New Zealand, he was a violinist in the orchestra. A string quartet regularly played at his home for over 25 years. Tombs served as a New Zealand representative of Trinity College of Music, and helped form the British Music Society's New Zealand Section. After his wife died, he married Evelyn May Rapley on 15 December 1951. In the 1960 Queen's Birthday Honours, Tombs was appointed an Officer of the Order of the British Empire, for services to art and music. Tombs died on 2 December 1966.
