= 1960 Birthday Honours (New Zealand) =

Awards list for New Zealand

The 1960 Queen's Birthday Honours in New Zealand, celebrating the official birthday of Elizabeth II, were appointments made by the Queen on the advice of the New Zealand government to various orders and honours to reward and highlight good works by New Zealanders. They were announced on 11 June 1960.

The recipients of honours are displayed here as they were styled before their new honour.

== Knight Bachelor ==
- George Douglas Robb CMG MD FRCS – a consulting surgeon, of Auckland.

== Order of the Bath ==
=== Companion (CB) ===
Military division

- Rear-Admiral John Michael Villiers OBE – lately on loan to the Royal New Zealand Navy.

== Order of Saint Michael and Saint George ==
=== Knight Commander (KCMG) ===
- The Honourable Eruera Tihema Tirikatene – Minister of Forests, Minister in charge of the Government Printing and Stationery Department, and Associate to the Minister of Maori Affairs.
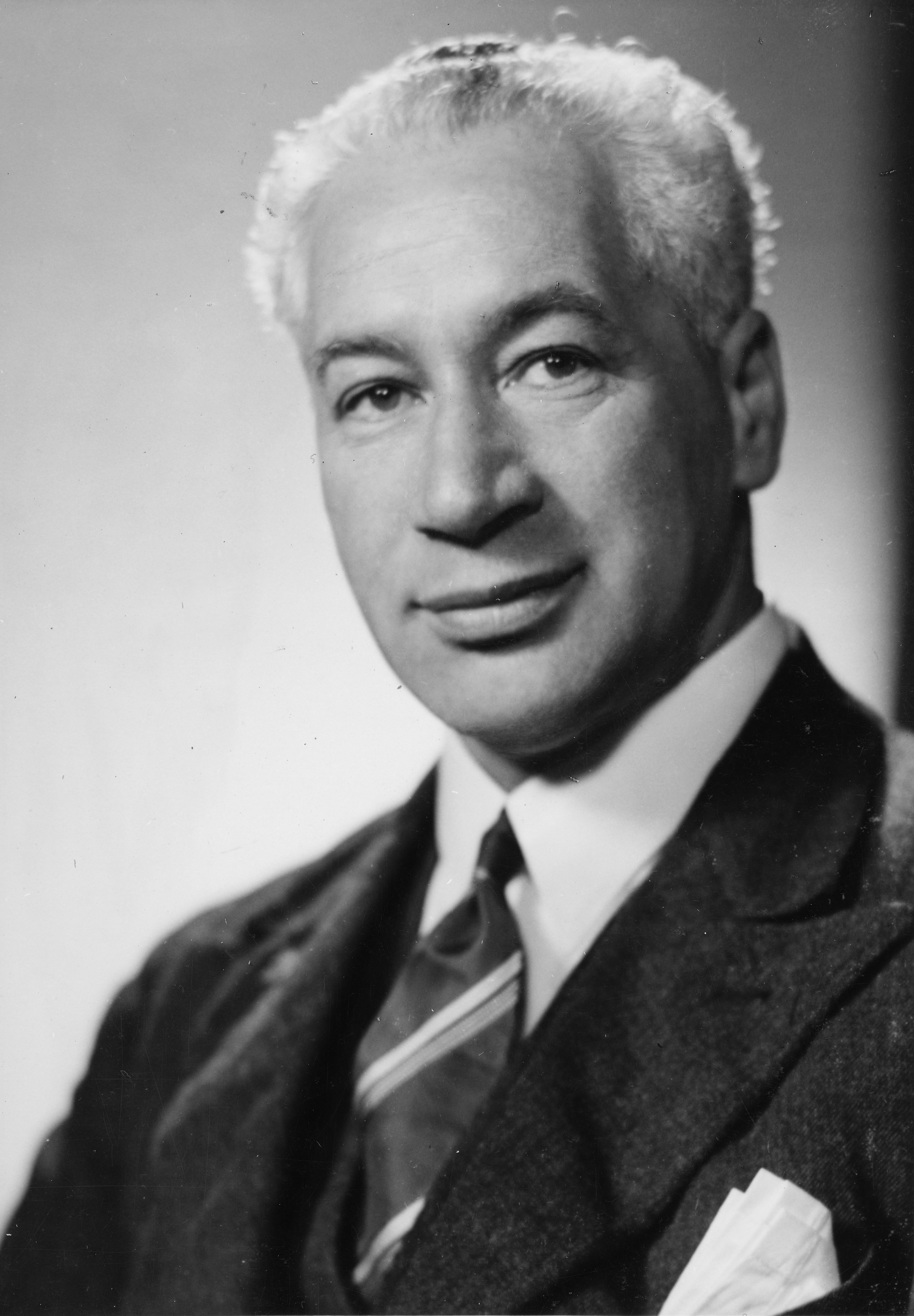
Sir Eruera Tirikatene

=== Companion (CMG) ===
- George Manning – of Christchurch. For services to education and local government.
- Robert McKeen – of Otaki. For services in public affairs as a trade unionist, Member of Parliament (1922–1954), and Speaker of the House of Representatives (1947–1950).
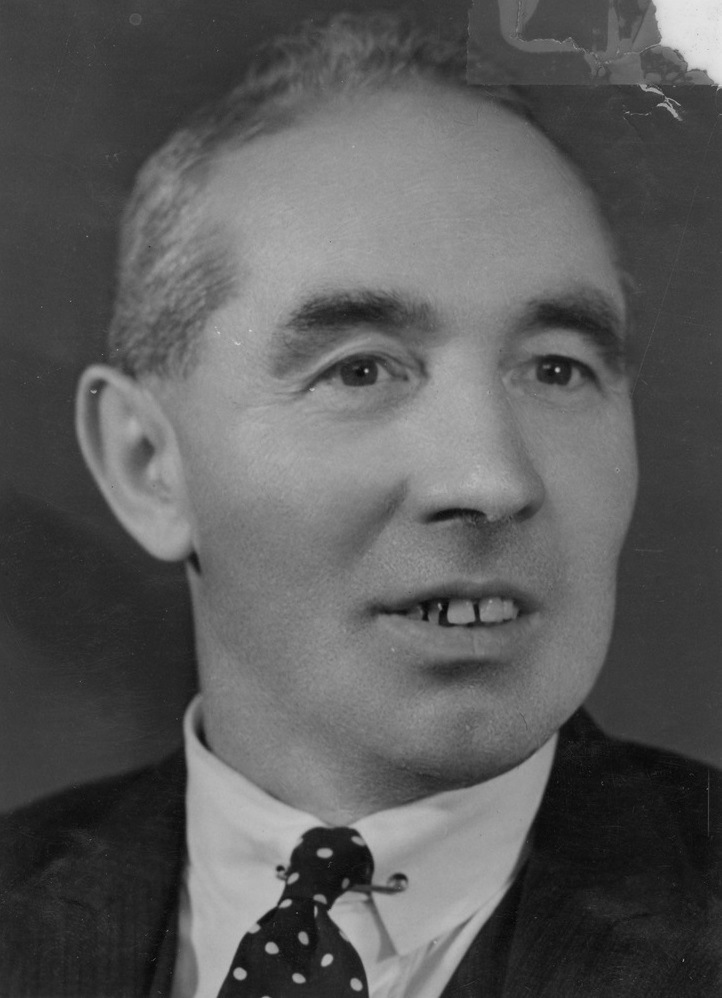
George Manning

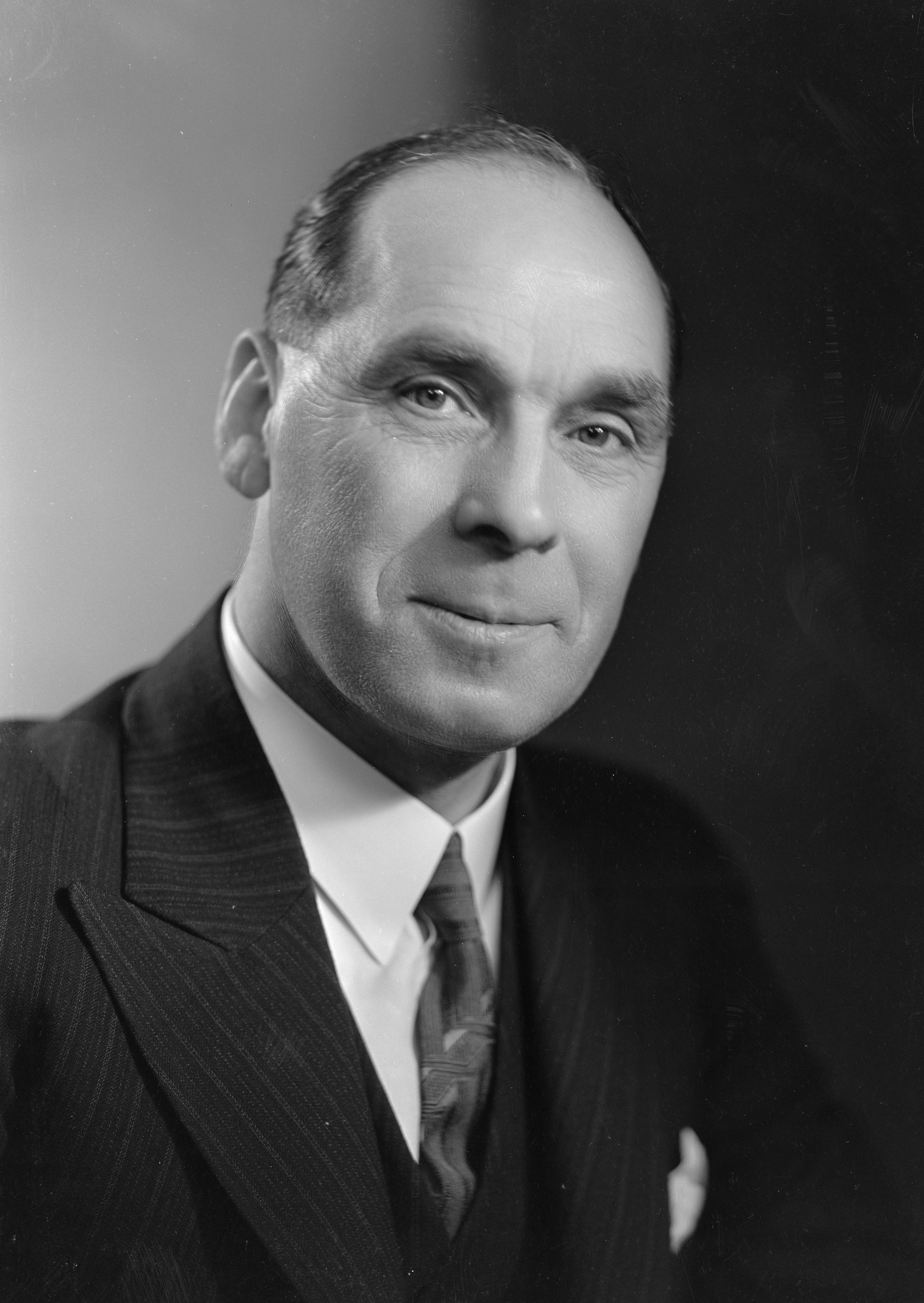
Robert McKeen

== Order of the British Empire ==
=== Commander (CBE) ===
Civil division

- Samuel Thompson Barnett – Secretary for Justice and Controller-General of Prisons, Department of Justice.
- Michael Connelly JP – of Dunedin. For services in the field of local government.
- Alfred Hayward – deputy chairman of the Dairy Board.
- The Honourable Fiame Mata'afa Faumuina Mulinu'u II – prime minister of Western Samoa.

Military division

- Captain Gillespie Hume Edwards RD – Royal New Zealand Naval Reserve.
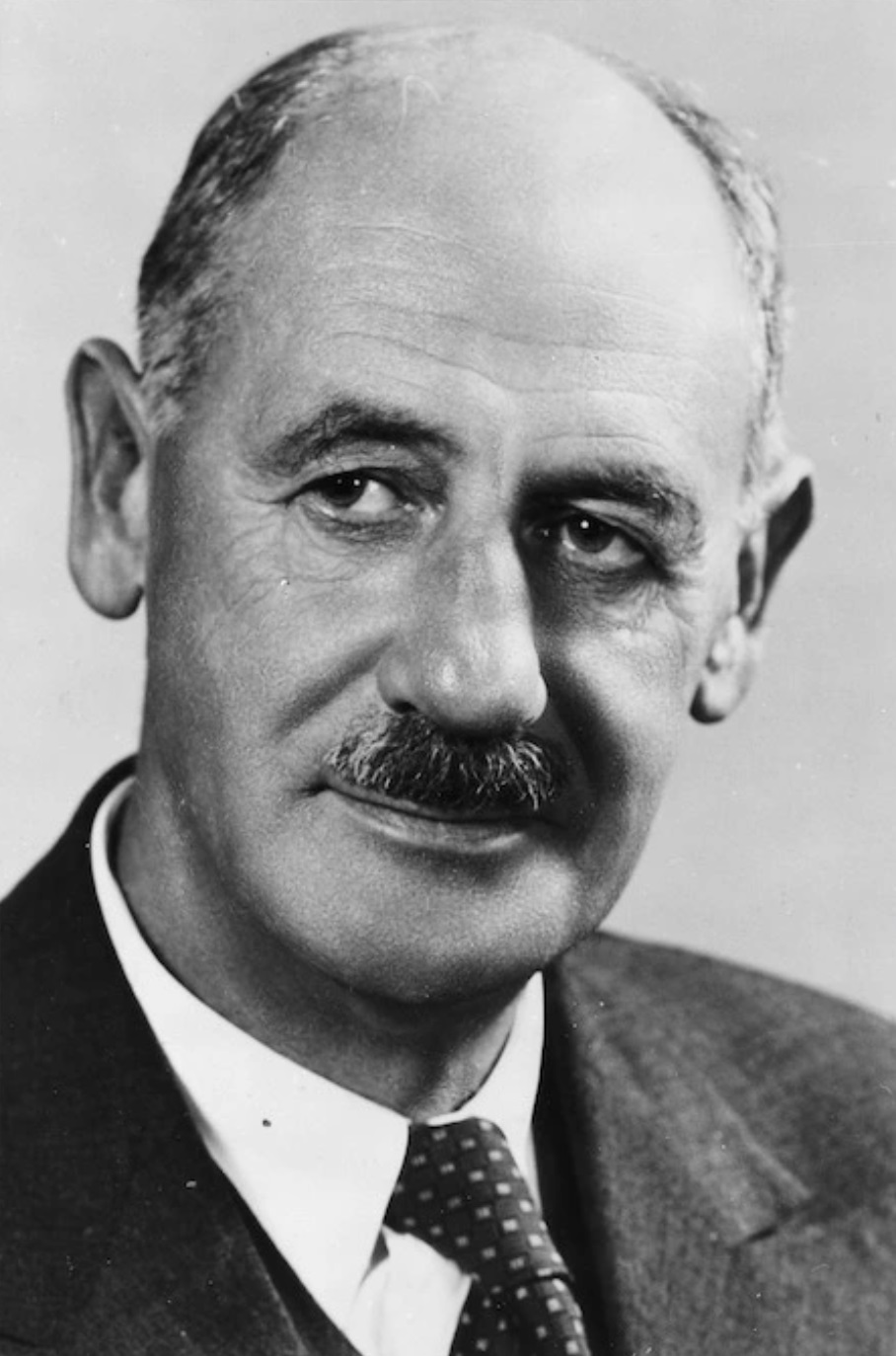
Sam Barnett

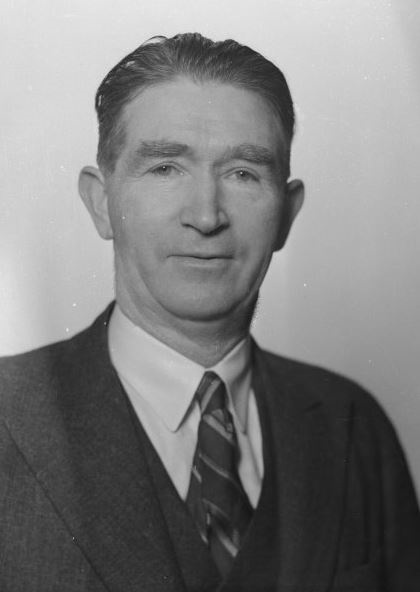
Michael Connelly

=== Officer (OBE) ===
Civil division

- Francis Cornelius Allerby – of Levin. For public services.
- Hugh Richard Jarvis Donald BM BCh – a medical practitioner, of Christchurch.
- Lewis Edward Harris – of Puketapu. For philanthropic and social-welfare services, especially in the interests of handicapped children.
- Charles John Hayward – a member of the Dunedin City Council.
- Frederick Arthur Kitchingham MBE – Crown solicitor, Greymouth (since 1921).
- Leslie John McDonald JP – in recognition of his services as director of the New Zealand Standards Institute (1936–1959), and to education.
- Mamea Matatumua – lately acting Secretary for Samoan Affairs, Western Samoa.
- Bertram Henry Olsson – director of the Naval Research Laboratory, Auckland.
- Īhāia Pōrutu Puketapu – of Lower Hutt. For social welfare services to Māori youth.
- Norman Hargrave Taylor – director of the Soil Bureau.
- Harry Hugo Tombs – of Wellington. For services to art and music.

Military division

- Commander David Lennox Millar VRD – Royal New Zealand Naval Volunteer Reserve.
- Lieutenant-Colonel Denis Lumsden Wood MC ED – Royal New Zealand Infantry Corps (Territorial Force).
- Wing Commander Ivan Reid Mitchell DFC – Royal New Zealand Air Force.
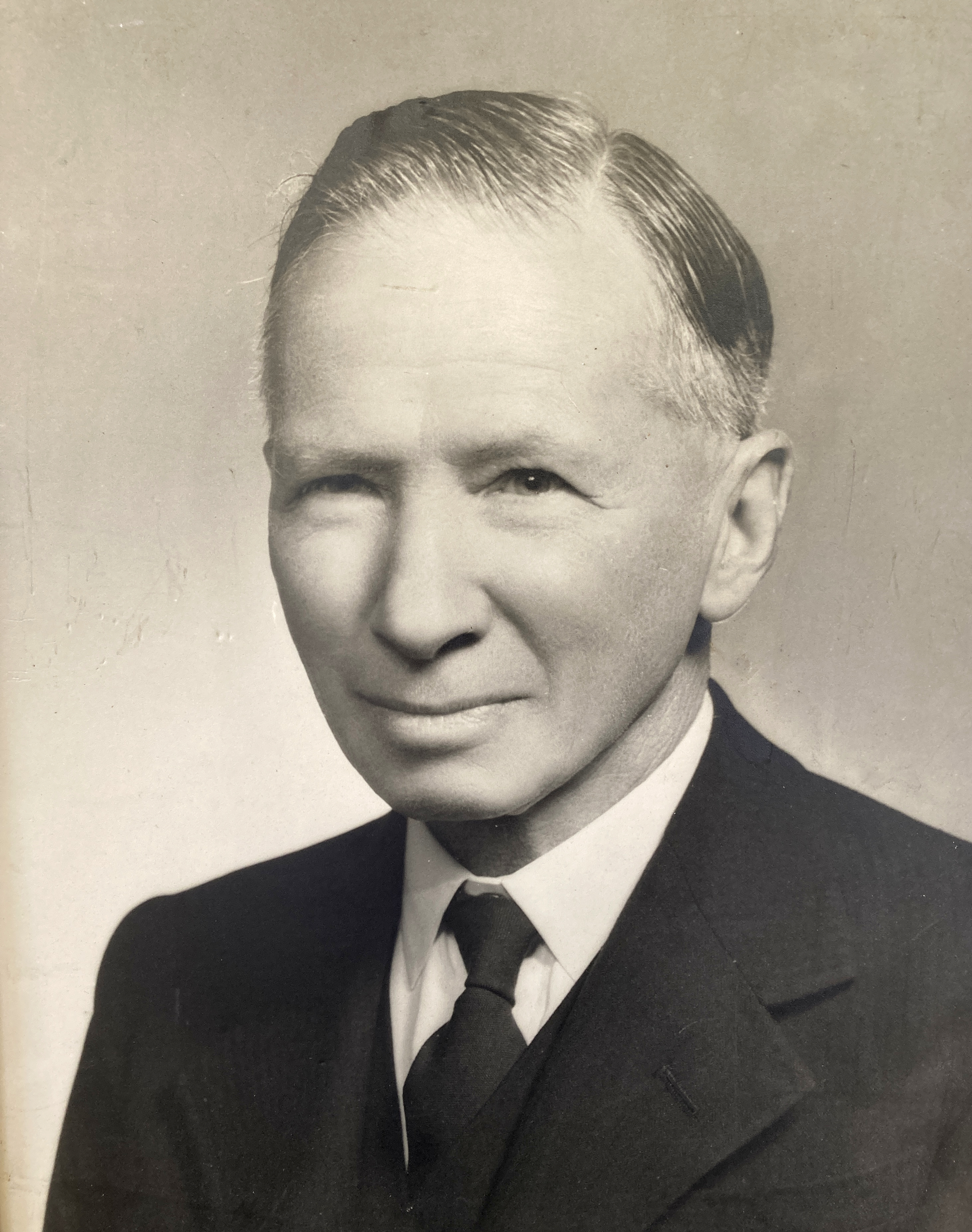
Fred Kitchingham

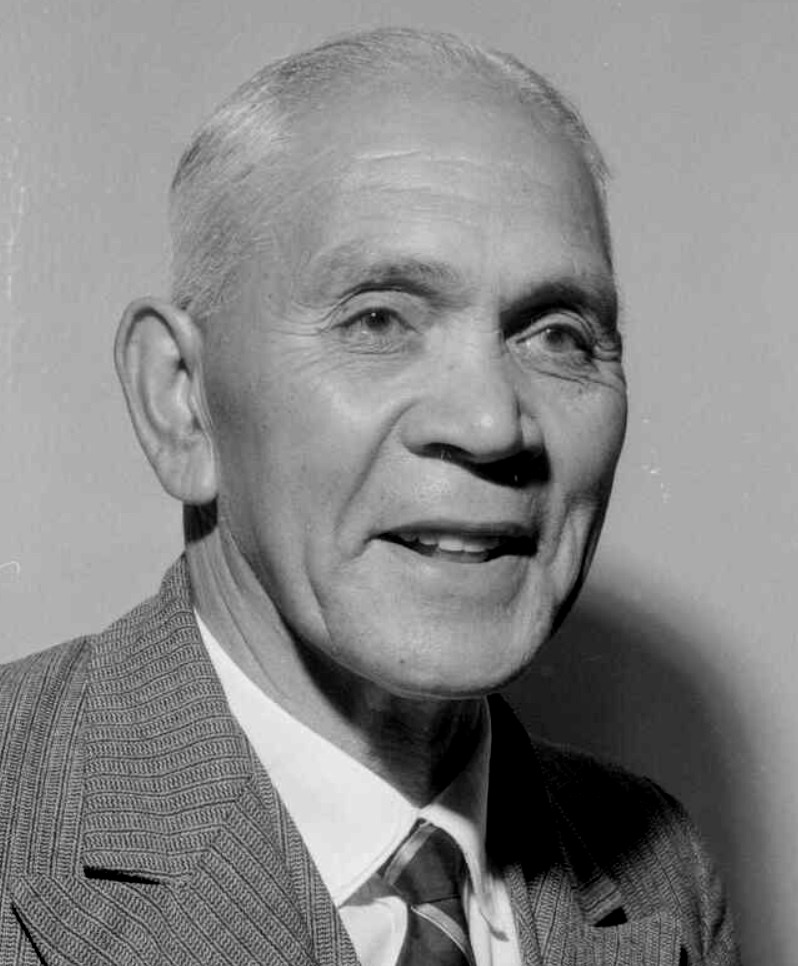
Īhāia Puketapu

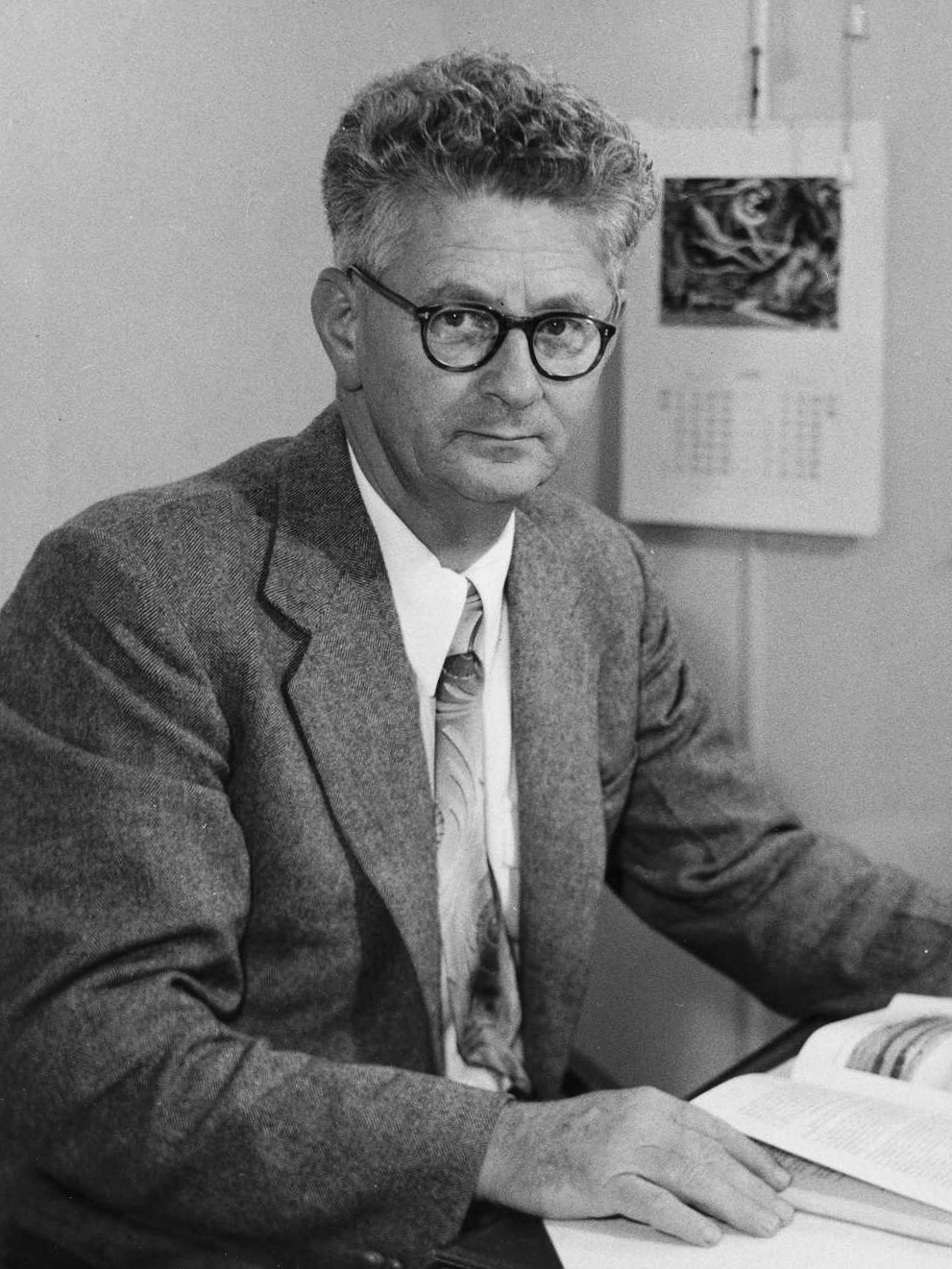
Norman Taylor

=== Member (MBE) ===
Civil division

- Robert William Stanley Botting – of Dunedin. For services in local-body affairs and to sport.
- Walter Godfrey Bowen – chief shearing instructor to the New Zealand Wool Board.
- Margaret Elizabeth Callan – of Auckland. For community services, especially through the Crippled Children's Society.
- The Reverend John Gilman Sharp Dunn – president of the CORSO Council and clerk of the General Assembly of the Presbyterian Church of New Zealand.
- Archer Garside JP – of Onehunga. For services to local government.
- Mabel Winifred Gunn – matron of the Whataroa Hospital, South Westland.
- George Alfred Harris – mayor of Temuka. For municipal and patriotic services.
- Andrew Jacob Haub JP – of New Plymouth. For services in connection with New Zealand justices of the peace.
- Lucy Eva Johnston – matron of the Abbotsford Home for Boys and Girls, Waipawa, and matron-in-charge, St Hilda's Home.
- Mabel Elizabeth Jolly – of Cromwell. For services to education, especially through the Correspondence School Parents' Association.
- Ivy Hazel Fletcher Jones JP – secretary-manager, Auckland Methodist Children's Home and Orphanage.
- David Erskine Sinclair Mason JP – engineer to the Southland Harbour Board.
- George Miller – of Wellington. For services to the community, especially amongst young people, and in the field of sport.
- Donald George Alfred Munro – of Wellington. For services to music.
- Oscar Gerald Smith – of Wellington. For services rendered under the auspices of the Returned Soldiers' Association.
- Eileen Hannah Spencer – of Palmerston North. For social-welfare services.
- Hōne Te Kāuru Taiapa – of Rotorua. For cultural services to the Māori people, especially in the field of wood carving.

Military division

- Warrant Officer First Class Neville William Faithful – New Zealand Regiment (Regular Force).
- Major Ronald Norman Griggs – Royal New Zealand Armoured Corps (Regular Force).
- Warrant Officer Second Class George Tom Holden MM ED – Royal New Zealand Armoured Corps (Territorial Force).
- Major (temporary) Douglas Ronald Orange ED – Royal New Zealand Army Service Corps (Territorial Force).
- Major (temporary) and Quartermaster Gordon William Stanley ED – Royal New Zealand Army Medical Corps (Regular Force).
- Flight Lieutenant William Francis Reece Jackson – Royal New Zealand Air Force.
- Warrant Officer Robert Thomas Francis Lewis – Royal New Zealand Air Force.
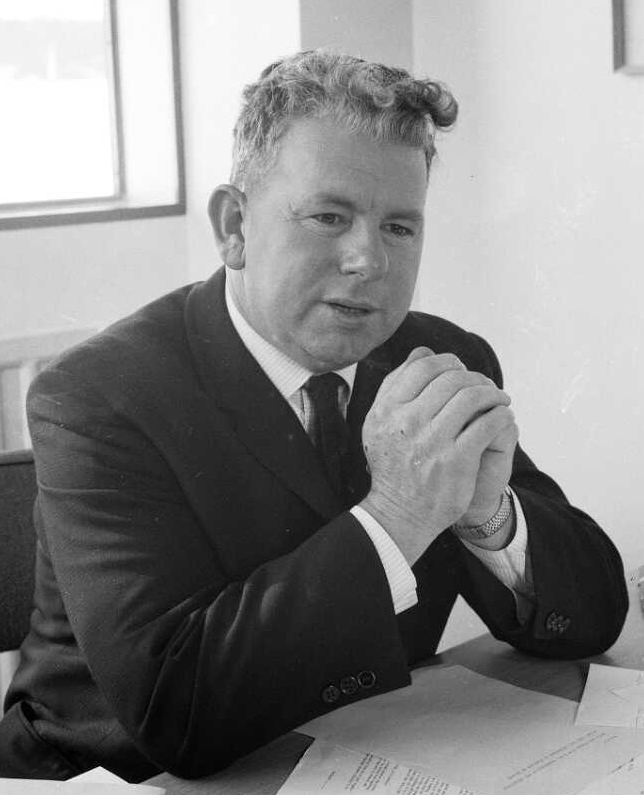
Godfrey Bowen

== Companion of the Imperial Service Order (ISO) ==
- Kenneth John Caverhill – lately director of the State Advances Corporation.
- Edward Stephen Gale – lately Comptroller of Customs, Customs Department.

== British Empire Medal (BEM) ==
Civil division

- Lawrence Gordon – temporary sergeant, New Zealand Police Force.
- George Innes – sergeant, New Zealand Police Force.

Military division

- Chief Petty Officer Frederick Maurice Glasson – Royal New Zealand Naval Volunteer Reserve.
- Chief Petty Officer George Frederick Marshall – Royal New Zealand Navy.
- Chief Petty Officer Cook (S) Gerald Victor Baldwin Martin – Royal New Zealand Navy.
- Chief Electrical Artificer Robert Thomas Noble Moffat – Royal New Zealand Navy.
- Staff-Sergeant (temporary) John Arthur Baker – Royal New Zealand Dental Corps (Regular Force).
- Sergeant (temporary) Douglas Alexander Branks – Royal New Zealand Infantry Corps (Territorial Force).
- Staff-Sergeant Douglas Donald Hamilton – Royal New Zealand Infantry Corps (Territorial Force).
- Staff Sergeant Johnston Henry Robert Love EM – Royal New Zealand Infantry Corps (Territorial Force).
- Staff Sergeant Alexander George Metcalfe – Corps of Royal New Zealand Electrical and Mechanical Engineers (Regular Force).
- Flight Sergeant William Alexander – Royal New Zealand Air Force.
- Sergeant Horace Floyd Williams – Royal New Zealand Air Force.

== Air Force Cross (AFC) ==
- Master Signaller James Alfred Easton – Royal New Zealand Air Force.

== Queen's Police Medal (QPM) ==
- Orme Snow Wilson Power – assistant commissioner, New Zealand Police Force.

== Queen's Commendation for Valuable Service in the Air ==
- Flight Lieutenant Colin William Rudd – Royal New Zealand Air Force.
- Sergeant Engineer Raymond William Tocker – Royal New Zealand Air Force.
