= Lakeland Queen =

Passenger ship in New Zealand

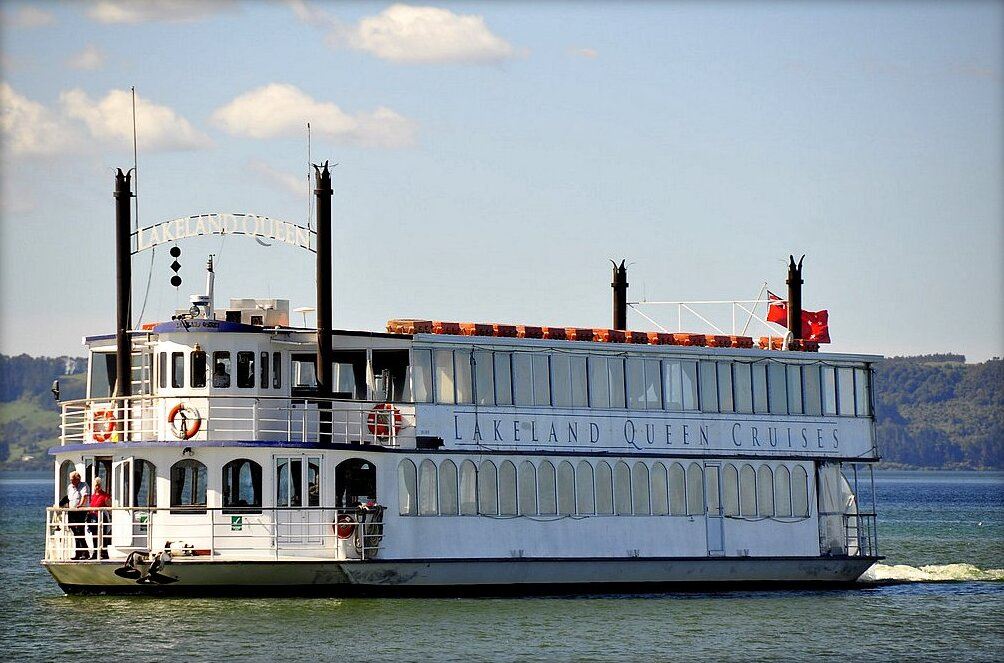
- Lakeland Queen in 2009

History

New Zealand
- Name: Lakeland Queen
- Owner: Damon & Arna Hagaman
- Builder: Lakeland Steel Products
- Laid down: February 1986
- Launched: 26 October 1986
- Commissioned: November 1986
- Refit: 2024–2025
- Status: In service

General characteristics
- Type: Sternwheel paddle boat
- Tonnage: 160 GRT
- Length: 32 m (105 ft 0 in)
- Beam: 8 m (26 ft 3 in)
- Height: 1.4 m (4 ft 7 in)
- Installed power: 240 hp (180 kW) Cummins diesel engine
- Propulsion: 8-bladed stern wheel

Lakeland Queen is a sternwheeler paddle boat that operates cruises on Lake Rotorua in New Zealand. She was built in Rotorua in 1986 by brothers Ian and Doug Stewart of the company Lakeland Steel Products, in the style of the historic Mississippi paddle steamers. Lakeland Queen was launched on 26 October 1986, and is the only sternwheeler passenger vessel in New Zealand. Lakeland Queen is used for breakfast, lunch and dinner cruises and sightseeing, and operates from a dedicated jetty on the Rotorua lakefront. Māori cultural entertainment has been provided on some cruises. The cruises often have live music, with Blues cruises a regular feature. The vessel has also been used for cruises to a wildlife reserve on Mokoia Island, in association with concession holders for the reserve.

There have been multiple owners over the years since launching, and in 2006 after a change of ownership, the vessel was extended with a 10-metre-long (33 ft) section added in the middle, increasing the overall length to 32 metres (105 ft). Lakeland Queen was laid up and in storage on the lakefront at Rotorua for almost four years until August 2025 when it was relaunched and began cruises again, following a major refit. As of December 2025, the vessel and business are for sale.

== History ==
Lakeland Queen was built in Rotorua in 1986 by brothers Ian and Doug Stewart of the company Lakeland Steel Products, in the style of the historic Mississippi paddle steamers. The design was prepared by a naval architect, Ted Ewbank. The vessel has a shallow draft and a flat bottom to suit the shoreline conditions in Lake Rotorua. It is powered by a 240 hp (180 kW) Cummins diesel engine powering a hydraulic system that drives an eight-bladed stern wheel. When originally built, it was 22 m (72 ft) long and 8 m (26 ft) wide. The keel was laid down in February 1986. The hull was substantially complete by October 1986, and it was transported 6 km (3.7 mi) by road from the Stewart brothers premises to the Lake Rotorua foreshore overnight on 25-26 October. The vessel was transported without funnels, paddlewheel, upper deck and pilot house. Two cranes were used to lower the hull into the lake on 26 October, and heavy machinery moved the hull into deeper water where it could float. The remaining components of the vessel were installed in subsequent weeks.

The fitout was largely completed by late November but low lake levels were an impediment to the maiden voyage. Bulldozers were used to deepen the 200 m (660 ft) long channel out from the wharf to a minimum of 55 cm (22 in) so that Lakeland Queen could reach deeper water and passengers services could commence. In mid-1987 the top deck was enclosed to provide additional restaurant space, bringing the capacity up to 120 passengers.

In December 1993, the vessel was sold by the Stewart brothers to two Rotorua businessmen who operated a business Mokoia Island Tours. The vessel was renamed Te Ao Kapurangi, after a 19th century female Maori leader. Evening cruises then included a cultural experience onshore at Mokoia Island. On 26 April 2006, the vessel was put under arrest at the wharf, when the company went into receivership with debts of more than $850,000. The receiver reverted the name of the vessel to Lakeland Queen and she was offered for sale.

Lakeland Queen was bought in July 2006 by a group of local entrepreneurs, including Terry Hammond. The new owners arranged for the vessel to be extended in length, by being cut in half and a new 10-metre-long (33 ft) section added in the middle, increasing the overall length to 32 metres (105 ft). The extension added another enclosed deck, and increased the passenger capacity to 266.

In 2021, Lakeland Queen was withdrawn from service because of a major downturn in tourist numbers following the closure of New Zealand's borders in response to the COVID-19 pandemic. She was laid up and stored onshore at Motutara Point. In late 2023, while the vessel was still laid up, the Lakeland Queen owners Terry and Raewyn Hammond were told that to restart their operation they would need to pay for the replacement of the deteriorated jetty. In addition, they would need to gift the new jetty to the iwi that owns the lake bed, and then lease it back. In January 2024, the owners were given six months to remove the vessel from the iwi-gifted public land where it had been sitting since 2021. The business went into liquidation in March 2024.

In 2024, Damon Hagaman, son of the hotel operator Earl Hagaman, together with Arna Hagaman, purchased the Lakeland Queen and commenced a major refit. The scope of work included rebuilding hydraulic systems, refurbishment of the paddle drive and steering gear, and overhaul of the bow thruster. After almost four years laid up, Lakeland Queen was relaunched into Lake Rotorua on 28 August 2025. Lakeland Queen returned to commercial service on 11 November 2025 following the completion of refurbishment and granting of a liquor licence.

In December 2025, seven weeks after the vessel recommenced commercial service, the Hagaman's put the vessel and business up for sale, stating that "Our goal was to save the Queen, not run it year after year".

== Incidents ==
- On 3 June 2000 at around 10:00 pm, Lakeland Queen lost power on a cruise and was forced to anchor offshore from Sulphur Point in bad weather and rough conditions. The Coastguard rescued 94 passengers and eight crew.
- On 12 March 2007, Lakeland Queen departed at 7:00 pm for an evening cruise, but stormy weather forced the vessel to shelter behind Mokoia Island. Adverse conditions prevented the vessel from docking until 3:00 am. The storm caused a large build-up of lake weed on the foreshore, which led to the cancellation of breakfast and lunch cruises the following day.
- On 30 May 2018, a Volcanic Air Safaris aircraft was taxiing when it crashed into Lakeland Queen. There were no injuries and only minor damage.
