= Hawke's Bay Regional Council =

Hawke's Bay Regional Council Te Kaunihera ā-Rohe o Te Matau-a-Māui
- Regional councils of New Zealand
- Established: 1 November 1989, 36 years ago

Leadership
- Chair: Sophie Siers since 29 October 2025
- Deputy: Jerf van Beek
- CEO: Nic Peet

Structure
- Seats: 11 seats
- Political groups: Independent (11)
- Length of term: 3 years, renewable

Elections
- Voting system: First-past-the-post
- Last election: 11 October 2025
- Next election: 2028

Meeting place
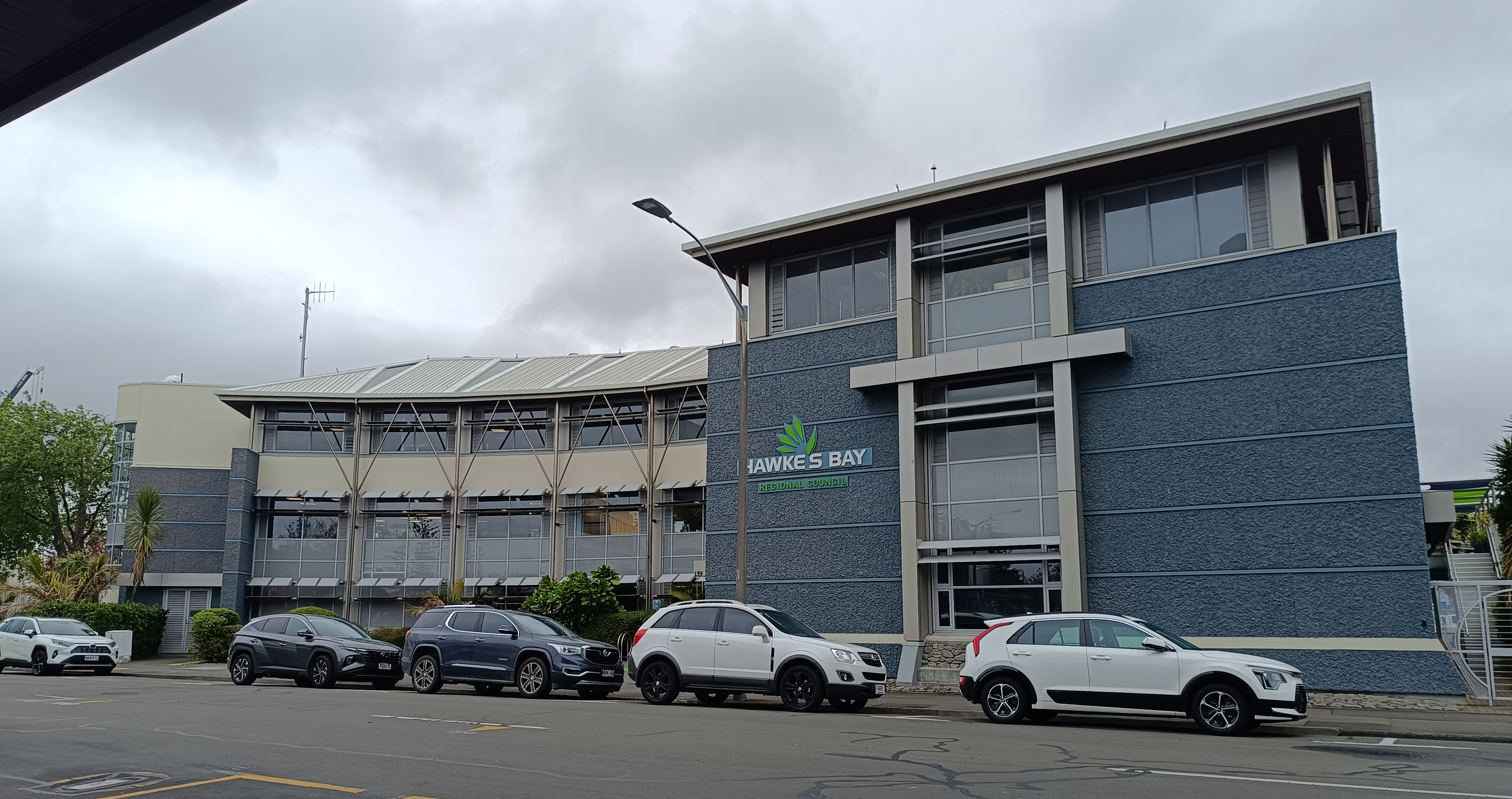
- 159 Dalton Street, Napier

Website
- hbrc.govt.nz

Hawke's Bay Regional Council (Māori: Te Kaunihera ā-Rohe o Te Matau-a-Māui) is the regional council for the Hawke's Bay Region of New Zealand's North Island. It has existed since the 1989 reforms to local government.

The council has 11 councillors and is currently chaired by Sophie Siers.

== History ==
=== Cyclone Gabrielle response ===
In February 2023, Cyclone Gabrielle struck much of New Zealand, including Hawke's Bay. The council was found to have major failings in its response to the disaster. The Ombudsman's office was looking into the council's property buyout scheme, which the council said it welcomed.

== Councillors ==
Councillor	Affiliation (Note: Per 2025 Hawke's Bay Regional Council election unless otherwise specified)	Constituency	In office since
Sophie Siers (Chair)	Independent	Heretaunga/Hastings	
Jerf van Beek (Deputy)	Independent	Ngāruroro	
Di Roadley	Independent	Wairoa	
Neil Kirton	Independent	Ahuriri/Napier	
Hinewai Ormsby	Independent	Ahuriri/Napier	
Louise Parsons	Independent	Ahuriri/Napier	18 October 2025
Jock Mackintosh	Independent	Heretaunga/Hastings	
Conrad Waitoa	Independent	Heretaunga/Hastings	18 October 2025
Tony Kuklinski	Independent	Tamatea/Central Hawke's Bay	18 October 2025
Michelle McIlroy	Independent	Māui ki te Raki Māori	18 October 2025
Thompson Hokianga	Independent	Māui ki te Tonga Māori	

== Regional chair ==
The council elects one of its members as the chair.

Chair	Affiliation	Term start	Term end
?
Hinewai Ormsby	Independent		29 October 2025
Sophier Siers	Independent	29 October 2025	present

== Elections ==
- 1989
- 1992
- 1995
- 1998
- 2001
- 2004
- 2007
- 2010
- 2013
- 2016
- 2019
- 2022
- 2025
