= Results of the 2025 New Zealand territorial authority elections in the Upper South Island =

2025 New Zealand territorial authority elections (Upper South Island)
- 11 October 2025
- Turnout: 54,305 (46.92% ▼2.39 pp)
- 3 of 3 local councils
Party	Councils	+/–
No majority	3	0
This lists parties that won seats. See the complete results below.
- 3 mayors and 40 local councillors
Party	Seats	+/–
Mayors
Independent	3	0
Local councillors
Independent	35	−1
ACT Local	2	+2
Sensible, Affordable and Ethical	2	+2
Labour	1	+1
This lists parties that won seats. See the complete results below.

Elections for the territorial authorities of New Zealand were held from 9 September until 11 October 2025 as part of that year's nation-wide local elections. 709 local councillors and 66 mayors were elected across 66 of 67 councils.

3 territorial authorities are located in the upper part of the South Island. 3 mayors and 40 district and city councillors were elected. All 3 mayors were re-elected and no group gained or held a majority on any council.

== Maps ==

Legend
Independent hold	Independent gain
	SAE gain
	ACT Local gain
	Labour gain

== Summary ==
=== Overall ===
Council	Electoral system	Seats	Mayor	Councillors	Control	Turnout	Details	Refs
Tasman	FPP	14	▌ Independent hold	▌ Independent 12 (▼1) ▌ Sensible, Affordable and Ethical 2 (▲2)	▌ No majority	20,183; 47.75% ▼2.29 pp	Details	
Nelson	STV	12	▌ Independent hold	▌ Independent 11 (▲2) ▌ Labour 1 (▲1)	▌ No majority	18,789; 48.59% ▼4.62 pp	Details	
Marlborough	STV	14	▌ Independent hold	▌ Independent 12 (▼2) ▌ ACT Local 2 (▲2)	▌ No majority	15,333; 44.05% ▼0.08 pp	Details	
3 of 3 councils		40						

=== Mayors ===
Council	Incumbent	Elected	Runner-up	Details	Refs
Tasman	Tim King (Ind)		Timo Neubauer (Ind)	Details	
Nelson	Nick Smith (Ind)		Aaron Stallard (Ind)	Details	
Marlborough	Nadine Taylor (Ind)		Shaun Brown (MFP)	Details	

=== Candidates ===
Party / ticket	Mayors				Councillors			
Party / ticket	2022	Candidates	Elected	+/−	2022	Candidates	Elected	+/−
Independent	3	10	3	0	36	72	35	▼1
ACT Local	no candidates				(new)	4	2	▲2
Sensible, Affordable and Ethical	no candidates				(new)	2	2	▲2
Labour	no candidates				0	1	1	▲1
Independent Green	no candidates				2	1	0	▼2
Money Free Party	0	2	0	0	no candidates			
Citizens	no candidates				1	0	0	▼1
Seats:	3		3	0	38		40	▲2

== Tasman District Council ==
2025 Tasman District Council election
- 11 October 2025
- Turnout: 20,183 (47.75% ▼2.29 pp)
- Mayor
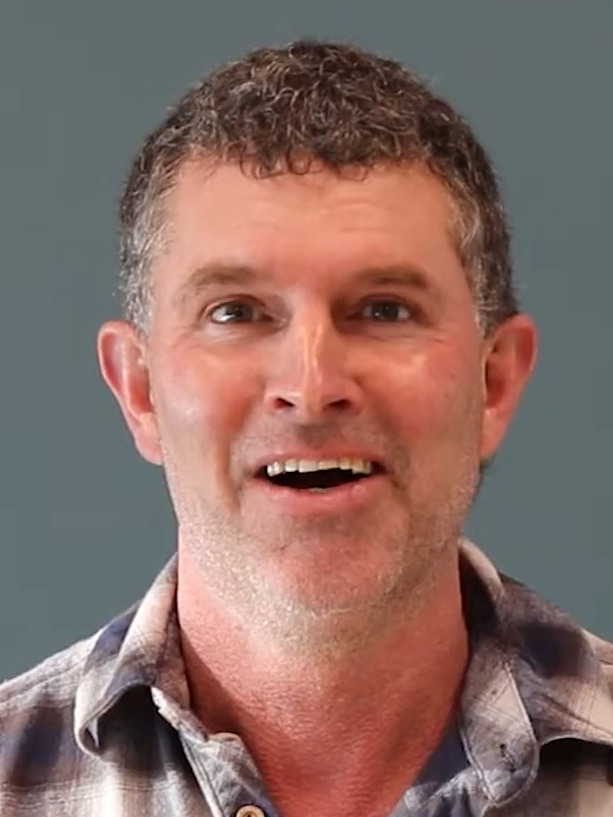

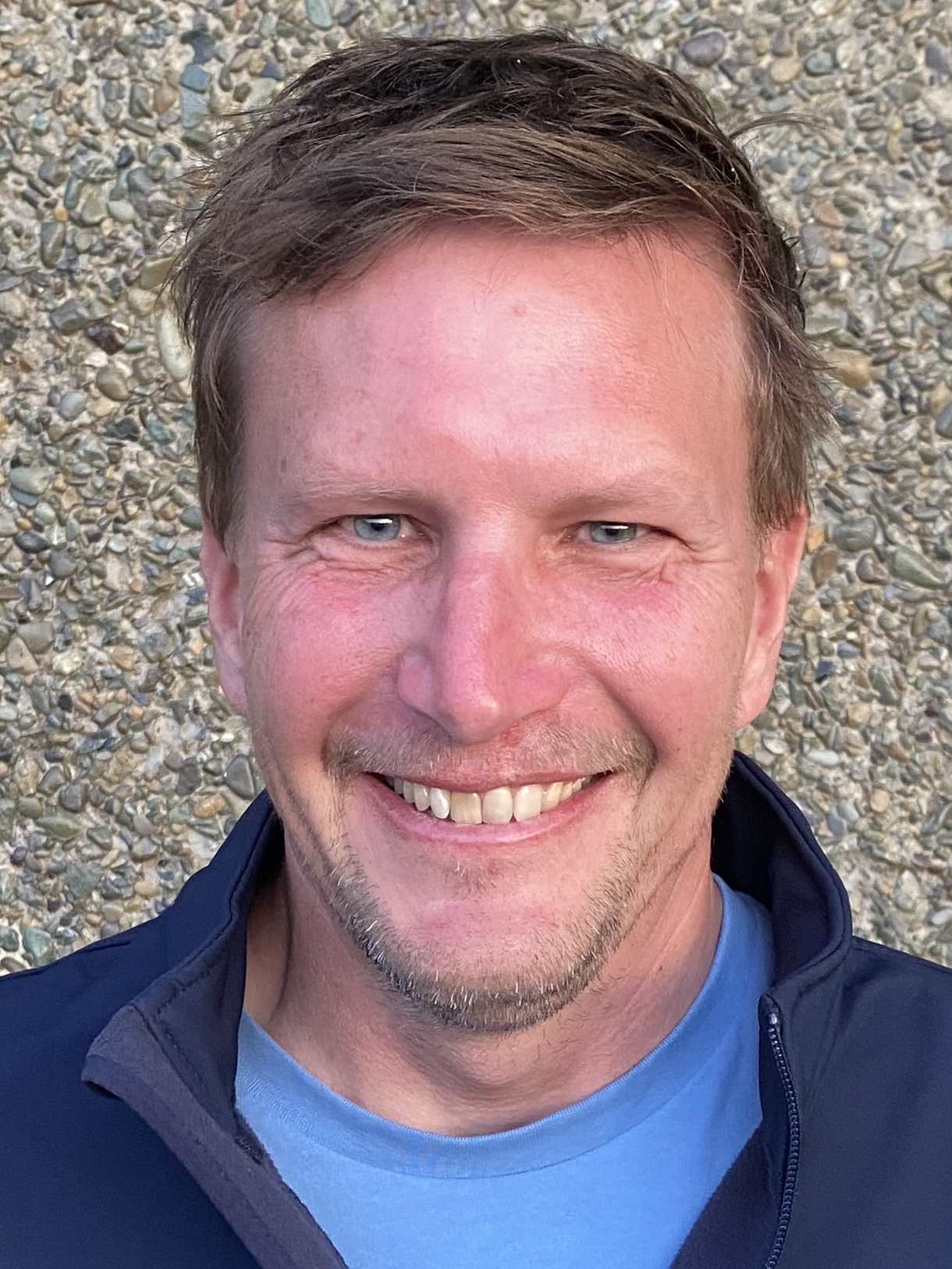

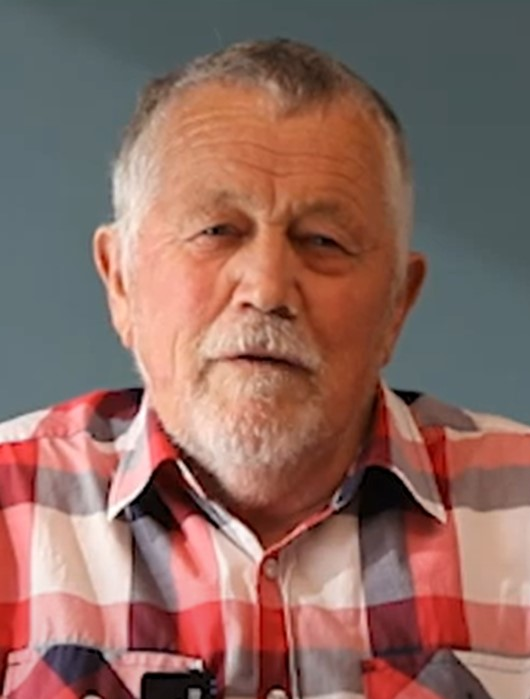

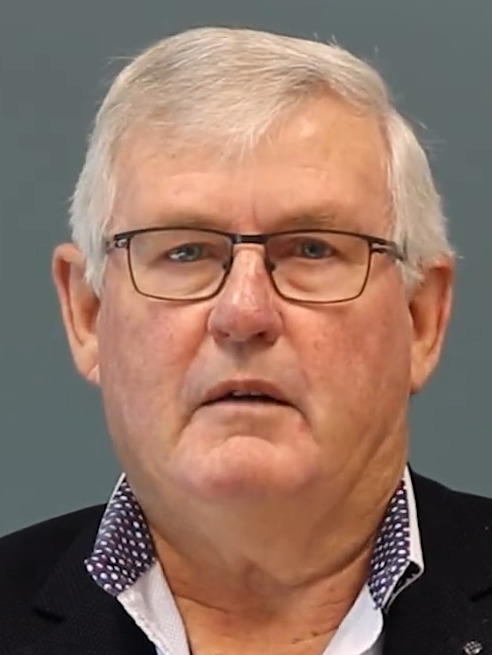
Candidate	Tim King	Timo Neubauer
Party	Independent	Independent
Popular vote	10,209	4,127
Percentage	50.58%	20.45%
Candidate	Richard Johns	Maxwell Clark
Party	Independent	Independent
Popular vote	3,931	1,220
Percentage	19.33%	6.04%
Mayor before election
Tim King
Independent
Elected mayor
Tim King
Independent
- Councillors
- 14 seats on the governing body of Tasman District Council; 8 seats needed for a majority
Party	Seats	+/–
Independent	12	−1
Sensible, Affordable and Ethical	2	+2
This lists parties that won seats. See the complete results below.
Control before	Control after
No majority	No majority

=== 2025 Tasman mayoral election ===
2025 Tasman mayoral election
Party	Candidate	Votes	%	±%
Independent	Tim King^{†}	10,209	50.58	−7.95
Independent	Timo Neubauer	4,127	20.45	(new)
Independent	Richard Sherwood Johns	3,901	19.33	(new)
Independent	Maxwell Clark	1,220	6.04	−6.90
Independent	Richard Osmaston	357	1.77	+0.61
Informal votes		32	0.16	+0.06
Blank votes		337	1.67	−0.25
Turnout		20,183	47.75	−2.29
Registered electors		42,270		
Independent hold				
^{†} incumbent

=== Richmond general ward ===
2025 Richmond general ward election
Party	Candidate	Votes	%	±%
Independent	Jo Ellis^{†}	3,554	55.45	+17.07
Independent	Kit Maling^{†}	3,452	53.86	−9.57
Independent	Timo Neubauer	3,413	53.25	(new)
Sensible, Affordable and Ethical	Mark Greening^{†}	3,064	47.81	+13.22
ACT Local	Daniel Shirley	3,052	47.62	(new)
Independent	Glen Daikee^{†}	2,991	46.67	+13.70
Informal votes		6	0.09	−0.06
Blank votes		107	1.67	−0.51
Turnout		6,409	46.41	−1.74
Registered electors		13,809		
Independent hold				
Independent hold				
Independent gain from Independent				
Sensible, Affordable and Ethical gain from Independent				
^{†} incumbent

=== Motueka general ward ===
2025 Motueka general ward election
Party	Candidate	Votes	%	±%
Independent	Brent Tahi Maru^{†}	3,011	72.47	+8.25
Independent	Trindi Walker^{†}	2,592	62.38	+17.54
Independent	Kerryn Jennifer Ferneyhough	2,271	54.66	(new)
ACT Local	Dave Ross	1,714	41.25	(new)
Informal votes		0	0.00	−0.30
Blank votes		45	1.08	+0.13
Turnout		4,155	46.69	−2.90
Registered electors		8,899		
Independent hold				
Independent hold				
Independent gain from Independent				
^{†} incumbent

=== Moutere-Waimea general ward ===
2025 Moutere-Waimea general ward election
Party	Candidate	Votes	%	±%
Independent	Dave Woods	3,177	57.89	(new)
Sensible, Affordable and Ethical	Dean McNamara	2,771	50.49	(new)
Independent	Mike Kininmonth^{†}	2,719	49.54	+7.59
Independent	Julian Alexander Eggers	2,708	49.34	(new)
Informal votes		7	0.13	+0.06
Blank votes		218	3.97	+1.31
Turnout		5,488	47.62	−3.28
Registered electors		11,525		
Independent gain from Independent				
Sensible, Affordable and Ethical gain from Independent				
Independent hold				
^{†} incumbent

=== Golden Bay general ward ===
2025 Golden Bay general ward election
Party	Candidate	Votes	%	±%
Independent	Mark Hume	1,110	45.36	(new)
Independent	Celia Butler^{†}	1,041	42.54	−26.23
Independent	Axel Downard-Wilke	898	36.70	(new)
Independent	Julian Hall	862	35.23	(new)
Independent	Rodney Taylor Barker	588	24.03	(new)
Informal votes		1	0.04	−0.04
Blank votes		16	0.65	−0.70
Turnout		2,447	58.55	+4.17
Registered electors		4,179		
Independent gain from Independent				
Independent hold				
^{†} incumbent

=== Lakes-Murchison general ward ===
2025 Lakes-Murchison general ward election
Party	Candidate	Votes	%	±%
Independent	John Gully	632	49.65	(new)
Independent	Nicola Shirley Allan	489	38.41	(new)
Independent	Richard Osmaston	111	8.72	+2.53
Informal votes		11	0.86	+0.72
Blank votes		30	2.36	+0.04
Turnout		1,273	50.60	+0.16
Registered electors		2,516		
Independent gain from Independent				

=== Te Tai o Aorere Māori ward ===
2025 Te Tai o Aorere Māori ward election
Party	Candidate	Votes	%	±%
Independent	Paul Te Poa Karoro Morgan	elected unopposed		
Registered electors		1,342		
Independent win (new seat)				

=== Referendum on Māori wards ===
Choice	Votes	%
I vote to REMOVE Māori wards	10,529	56.17
I vote to KEEP Māori wards	8,216	43.83
Total	18,745	100.00
Valid votes	18,745	92.88
Invalid votes	4	0.02
Blank votes	1,434	7.10
Total votes	20,183	100.00
Registered voters/turnout	42,270	47.75
Source: TDC & MCERT

== Nelson City Council ==
2025 Nelson City Council election
- 11 October 2025
- Turnout: 18,789 (48.59% ▼4.62 pp)
- Mayor
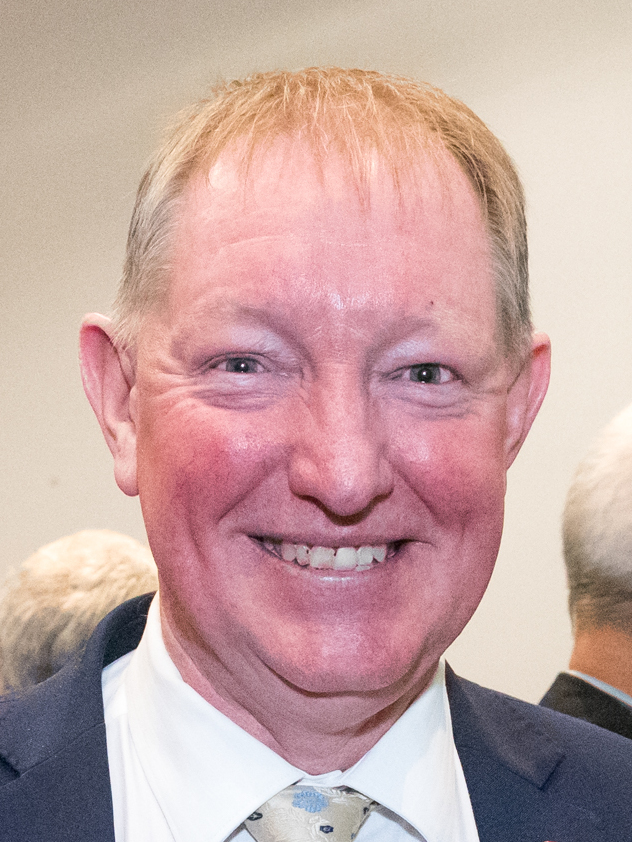
		Ind
Candidate	Nick Smith	Aaron Stallard
Party	Independent	Independent
Primary vote	10,957	6,898
Percentage	58.32%	36.71%
Mayor before election
Nick Smith
Independent
Elected mayor
Nick Smith
Independent
- Councillors
- 12 seats on the governing body of Nelson City Council; 7 seats needed for a majority
Party	Seats	+/–
Independent	11	+2
Labour	1	+1
This lists parties that won seats. See the complete results below.
Control before	Control after
No majority	No majority

=== 2025 Nelson mayoral election ===
2025 Nelson mayoral election
Party	Candidate	Primary votes	%	±%	Iteration	
Party	Candidate	Primary votes	%	±%	#	Votes
Independent	Nick Smith^{†}	10,957	58.32	+12.47	1st	10,957
Independent	Aaron Stallard	6,898	36.71	(new)	1st	6,898
Independent	John Wakelin	308	1.64	+1.36	1st	308
Money Free	Richard Osmaston	288	1.53	+1.10	1st	288
Quota		9,226	49.10	−109.11		
Informal votes		23	0.12	−0.36		
Blank votes		315	1.68	+0.12		
Turnout		18,789	48.59	−4.62		
Registered electors		38,665				
Independent hold on 1st iteration						
^{†} incumbent

=== Nelson at-large ===
2025 Nelson at-large election
Party	Candidate	Primary votes	%	±%	Iteration	
Party	Candidate	Primary votes	%	±%	#	Votes
Independent	Aaron Stallard	5,633	29.98	(new)	1st	5,633
Independent	Tim Skinner^{†}	3,529	18.78	−5.14	7th	4,600
Independent	Nigel Skeggs	2,388	12.71	(new)	8th	4,271
Independent	Chris Baillie	2,360	12.56	(new)	8th	3,465
Independent	Susa Guhl	1,344	7.15	(new)	6th	2,250
Independent	Anne Michele Dickinson	1,000	5.32	(new)	5th	1,366
Independent	Jeremy Matthews	800	4.26	(new)	4th	890
Independent	Keith Palmer	447	2.38	(new)	3rd	529
Independent	Graeme K Tyree	251	1.34	(new)	2nd	538
Quota		4,438	23.62	+0.40		
Informal votes		331	1.76	+0.16		
Blank votes		706	3.76	−1.21		
Turnout		18,789	48.59	−4.62		
Registered electors		38,665				
Independent gain from Independent Green on 1st iteration						
Independent hold on 7th iteration						
Independent gain from Independent Green on 8th iteration						
^{†} incumbent

=== Central general ward ===
2025 Central general ward election
Party	Candidate	Primary votes	%	±%	Iteration	
Party	Candidate	Primary votes	%	±%	#	Votes
Independent	Lisa Austin	1,767	19.07	(new)	1st	1,767
Independent	Pete Rainey^{†}	1,486	16.04	−9.25	9th	1,768
Independent	James Hodgson^{†}	1,137	12.27	+4.88	12th	1,688
Independent	Matty Anderson^{†}	1,215	13.11	(new)	13th	1,711
Independent	Steph Phillips	1,001	10.80	(new)	13th	1,487
Independent	Marie Lindaya	477	5.15	(new)	11th	650
Independent	David North	435	4.69	(new)	10th	571
Independent	Mike Ward	484	5.22	(new)	8th	518
Independent	Lenny Blake	340	3.67	(new)	6th	387
Independent	Tilman Walk	158	1.71	(new)	5th	170
Independent	Sand McDougall	124	1.34	(new)	4th	132
Independent	Jackie Galland	121	1.31	(new)	3rd	122
Independent	Anton Hyman	28	0.30	(new)	1st	28
Quota		1,755	18.94	+0.99		
Informal votes		176	1.90	−1.20		
Blank votes		315	3.40	−3.15		
Turnout		9,266	51.30	−5.34		
Registered electors		18,063				
Independent gain from Independent on 1st iteration						
Independent hold on 9th iteration						
Independent gain from Citizens on 12th iteration						
Independent hold on 13th iteration						
^{†} incumbent

=== Stoke-Tāhunanui general ward ===
2025 Stoke-Tāhunanui general ward election
Party	Candidate	Primary votes	%	±%	Iteration	
Party	Candidate	Primary votes	%	±%	#	Votes
Independent	Campbell Rollo^{†}	1,972	21.78	+10.36	1st	1,972
Independent	Mel Courtney^{†}	1,941	21.44	−2.46	1st	1,941
Labour	Sarah Kerby	1,445	15.96	(new)	7th	1,829
Independent	Trudie Brand^{†}	1,045	11.54	+1.98	10th	1,624
Independent	Balmai Palatchie	598	6.60	+0.80	10th	1,093
Independent	Mike Nicholls	586	6.47	(new)	9th	930
Independent Green	Guy Coulson	487	5.38	(new)	6th	545
Independent	Dan Robinson	262	2.89	(new)	5th	330
Independent	Paul Lacy	249	2.75	(new)	4th	278
Quota		1,717	18.96	+0.67		
Informal votes		185	2.04	−0.68		
Blank votes		285	3.15	−2.20		
Turnout		9,055	47.89	−4.48		
Registered electors		18,907				
Independent hold on 1st iteration						
Independent hold on 1st iteration						
Labour gain from Independent on 7th iteration						
Independent hold on 10th iteration						
^{†} incumbent

=== Whakatū Māori ward ===
2025 Whakatu Māori ward election
Party	Candidate	Primary votes	%	±%	Iteration	
Party	Candidate	Primary votes	%	±%	#	Votes
Independent	Kahu Paki Paki^{†}	elected unopposed				
Registered electors		1,695				
Independent hold on 1st iteration						
^{†} incumbent

=== Referendum on Māori wards ===
Choice	Votes	%
I vote to KEEP Māori wards	10,168	57.26
I vote to REMOVE Māori wards	7,590	42.74
Total	17,758	100.00
Valid votes	17,758	94.51
Invalid votes	2	0.01
Blank votes	1,029	5.48
Total votes	18,789	100.00
Registered voters/turnout	38,665	48.59
Source: electionz.com & MCERT

== Marlborough District Council ==
2025 Marlborough District Council election
- 11 October 2025
- Turnout: 15,333 (44.05% ▼0.08 pp)
- Mayor
		MFP
Candidate	Nadine Taylor	Shaun Brown
Party	Independent	Money Free
Primary vote	13,371	820
Percentage	87.20%	5.35%
Mayor before election
Nadine Taylor
Independent
Elected mayor
Nadine Taylor
Independent
- Councillors
- 14 seats on the governing body of Marlborough District Council; 8 seats needed for a majority
Party	Seats	+/–
Independent	12	−2
ACT Local	2	+2
This lists parties that won seats. See the complete results below.
Control before	Control after
No majority	No majority

=== 2025 Marlborough mayoral election ===
2025 Marlborough mayoral election
Party	Candidate	Primary votes	%	±%	Iteration	
Party	Candidate	Primary votes	%	±%	#	Votes
Independent	Nadine Taylor^{†}	13,371	87.20	+7.72	1st	13,371
Money Free	Shaun Brown	820	5.35	(new)	1st	820
Independent	Ni Fruean	419	2.73	(new)	1st	419
Quota		7,305	47.64	−1.41		
Informal votes		22	0.14	+0.01		
Blank votes		701	4.57	+2.79		
Turnout		15,333	44.05	−0.08		
Registered electors		34,807				
Independent hold on 1st iteration						
^{†} incumbent

=== Marlborough Sounds general ward ===
2025 Marlborough Sounds general ward election
Party	Candidate	Primary votes	%	±%	Iteration	
Party	Candidate	Primary votes	%	±%	#	Votes
Independent	Barbara Faulls^{†}	1,195	40.74	−7.16	1st	1,195
ACT Local	Malcolm Taylor	639	21.79	(new)	3rd	704
Independent	Raylene Innes^{†}	264	9.00	+2.51	6th	738
Independent	Scott Fuller	273	9.31	(new)	6th	490
Independent	Anteisha O'Connell	316	10.77	(new)	5th	399
Independent	Greg Billington	162	5.52	(new)	2nd	198
Quota		712	24.28	−0.12		
Informal votes		46	1.57	+0.76		
Blank votes		38	1.30	−0.31		
Turnout		2,933	46.24	−0.01		
Registered electors		6,343				
Independent hold on 1st iteration						
ACT Local gain from Independent on 3rd iteration						
Independent hold on 6th iteration						
^{†} incumbent

=== Wairau-Awatere general ward ===
2025 Wairau-Awatere general ward election
Party	Candidate	Primary votes	%	±%	Iteration	
Party	Candidate	Primary votes	%	±%	#	Votes
Independent	Scott Adams^{†}	elected unopposed				
Independent	Sally Arbuckle^{†}	elected unopposed				
Independent	Gerald Hope^{†}	elected unopposed				
Registered electors		8,114				
Independent hold on 1st iteration						
Independent hold on 1st iteration						
Independent hold on 1st iteration						
^{†} incumbent

=== Blenheim general ward ===
2025 Blenheim general ward election
Party	Candidate	Primary votes	%	±%	Iteration	
Party	Candidate	Primary votes	%	±%	#	Votes
Independent	David Croad^{†}	1,942	23.05	+6.70	1st	1,942
Independent	Cyril Dawson	1,095	13.00	+8.11	1st	1,095
Independent	Brian Dawson^{†}	713	8.46	+0.51	7th	1,020
Independent	Deborah Dalliessi^{†}	547	6.49	−2.83	14th	1,049
Independent	Thelma Sowman^{†}	600	7.12	−5.38	14th	1,039
ACT Local	John Hyndman	713	8.46	(new)	14th	1,013
Independent	Benjamin Stace	442	5.25	(new)	25th	975
Independent	Tamsin Cooper	449	5.33	(new)	25th	964
Independent	Cathie Bell	424	5.03	(new)	13th	638
Independent	Aimee Payne	377	4.47	(new)	11th	498
Independent	Bob Watson	349	4.14	(new)	9th	413
Independent	Nyara Nyajena	214	2.54	(new)	7th	258
Independent	Buks Lundt	143	1.70	(new)	6th	166
Independent	Vish Prasad	102	1.21	(new)	5th	113
Independent	Ni Fruean	44	0.52	−0.29	4th	49
Independent	Dominique Greenslade	40	0.47	(new)	3rd	42
Quota		1,024	12.15	−0.17		
Informal votes		152	1.80	+1.24		
Blank votes		80	0.95	+0.05		
Turnout		8,426	45.58	+0.57		
Registered electors		18,488				
Independent hold on 1st iteration						
Independent gain from Independent on 1st iteration						
Independent hold on 7th iteration						
Independent hold on 14th iteration						
Independent hold on 14th iteration						
ACT Local gain from Independent on 14th iteration						
Independent gain from Independent on 25th iteration						
^{†} incumbent

=== Marlborough Māori ward ===
2025 Marlborough Māori ward election
Party	Candidate	Primary votes	%	±%	Iteration	
Party	Candidate	Primary votes	%	±%	#	Votes
Independent	Allanah Burgess^{†}	elected unopposed				
Registered electors		1,862				
Independent hold on 1st iteration						
^{†} incumbent

=== Referendum on Māori wards ===
Choice	Votes	%
I vote to REMOVE Māori wards	8,111	58.37
I vote to KEEP Māori wards'	5,786	41.63
Total	13,897	100.00
Valid votes	13,897	90.63
Invalid votes	1	0.01
Blank votes	1,435	9.36
Total votes	15,333	100.00
Registered voters/turnout	34,807	44.05
Source: electionz.com & MCERT
