= 2022 Nelson City Council election =

Local election in New Zealand

- 8 October 2022
- Turnout: 20,897 (53.2%)
- Mayoral election
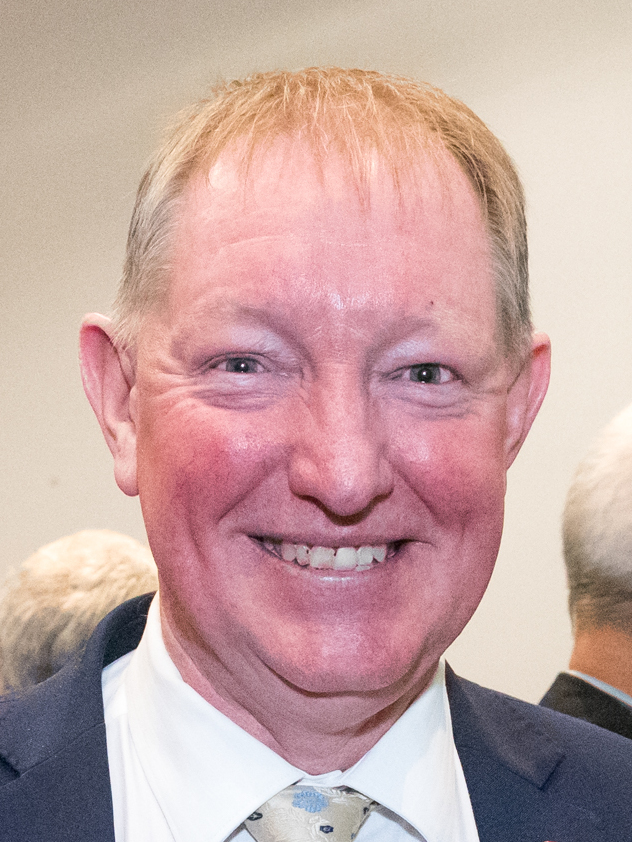

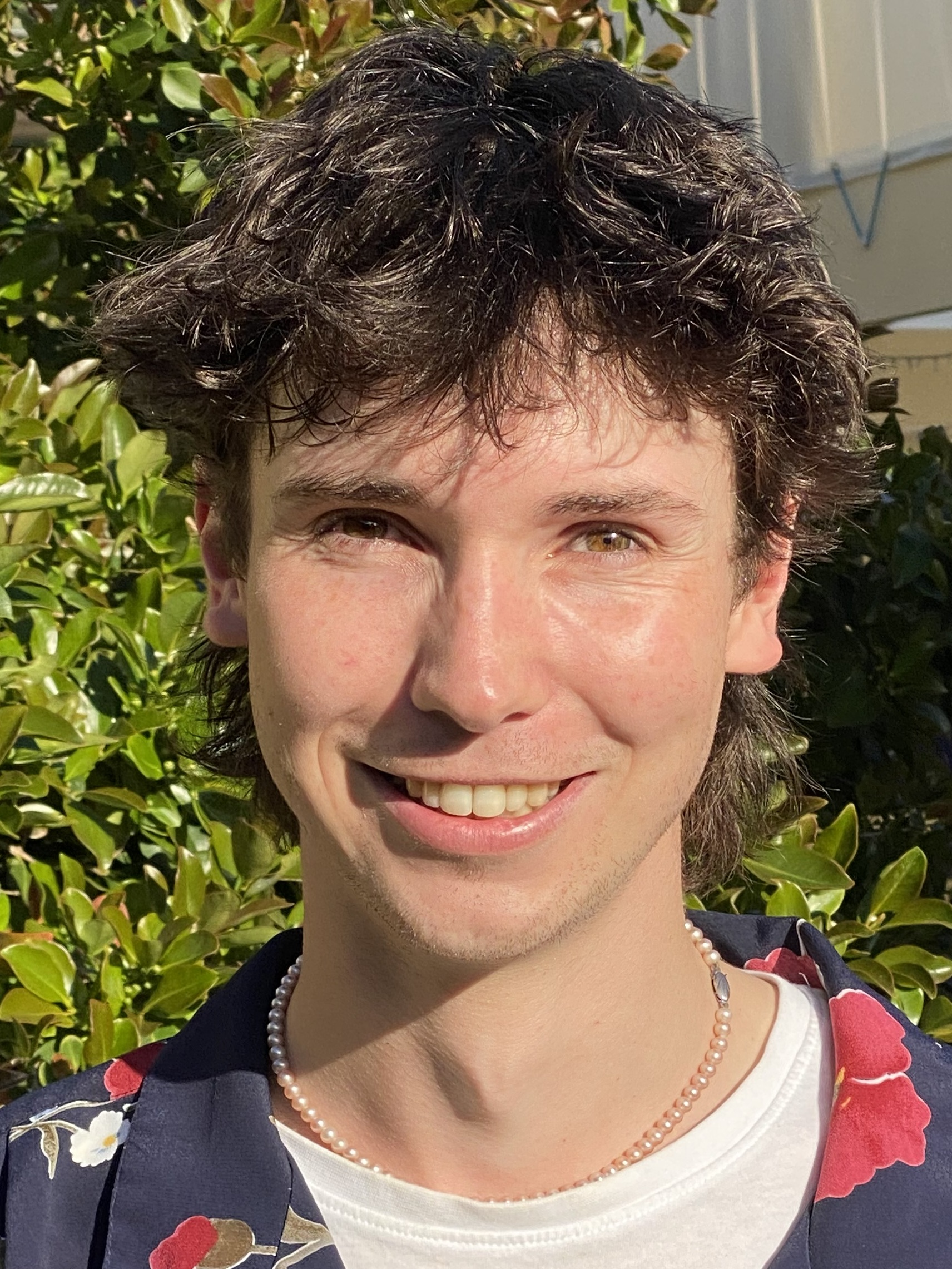

Candidate	Nick Smith	Matt Lawrey
Affiliation	Independent	Independent
Primary vote	9,582	5,750
Percentage	58.32%	27.52%
Final vote	10,569	6,352
Candidate	Rohan O'Neill-Stevens	Tim Skinner
Affiliation	Independent Green	Citizens
Primary vote	2,642	2,159
Percentage	13.98%	10.33%
Final vote	2,921	eliminated
Mayor before election
Rachel Reese
Independent
Elected mayor
Nick Smith
Independent
- Council election
- 12 seats on the Nelson City Council; 7 seats needed for a majority
Party	Seats	+/–
Independent	9	0
Independent Green	2	0
Citizens	1	+1
This lists parties that won seats. See the complete results below.

The 2022 Nelson City Council election was a local election held from 16 September to 8 October in Nelson, New Zealand, as part of that year's nation-wide local elections. Voters elected the mayor of Nelson and 12 city councillors for the 2025–2028 term of the Nelson City Council. Postal voting and the single transferable vote system were used.

Incumbent mayor Rachel Reese did not stand for re-election. Former National MP and government minister Nick Smith won the race, defeating second place Matt Lawrey by over 3,000 votes on final preferences.

== Campaign ==
=== Nelson Citizens Alliance ===
A ticket called the Nelson Citizens Alliance ran nine candidates, including endorsing Tim Skinner for mayor. They would support the endorsed candidates with getting elected but would not have any long term involvement or force cooperation between endorsees. The group was against the Labour government's Three Waters reforms.

== Results ==
=== Mayoral ===
2022 Nelson mayoral election
Party	Candidate	Primary votes	%	±%	Iteration	
Party	Candidate	Primary votes	%	±%	#	Votes
Independent	Nick Smith	9,582	46.12	(new)	5th	10,569
Independent	Matt Lawrey	5,750	27.67	(new)	5th	6,352
Independent Green	Rohan O'Neill-Stevens	2,642	12.72	(new)	5th	2,921
Citizens	Tim Skinner	2,159	10.39		4th	2,253
Independent	Kerry Neal	363	1.75	(new)	3rd	369
Money Free	Richard Osmaston	90	0.43	(new)	2nd	94
Independent	John Wakelin	59	0.28		1st	59
Quota		10,323	49.68			
Informal votes		31	0.15			
Blank votes		102	0.49			
Turnout		20,778	52.90			
Registered electors		39,276				
Independent gain from Independent on 5th iteration						

=== At-large ward ===
At-large ward
Party	Candidate	Primary votes	%	±%	Iteration	
Party	Candidate	Primary votes	%	±%	#	Votes
Independent Green	Rohan O'Neill-Stevens^{†}	5,678	27.32		1st	5,678
Independent	Tim Skinner^{†}	4,998	24.05		1st	4,998
Independent Green	Rachel Sanson^{†}	2,942	14.16		15th	4,608
Independent	Ian Williams	1,209	5.82	(new)	15th	1,915
Citizens	Zoe Byrne	1,236	5.95	(new)	15th	1,870
Independent	Mike Ward	1,141	5.49		14th	1,679
Citizens	Mani Rai	638	3.07	(new)	11th	856
Independent	Marie Lindaya	547	2.63	(new)	10th	784
Independent	Cindy Batt	518	2.49	(new)	7th	616
Independent	Brent Pahl	263	1.27	(new)	5th	294
Independent	Margot Haley	238	1.15	(new)	4th	267
Quota		4,852	23.35			
Informal votes		334	1.61			
Blank votes		1,039	5.00			
Turnout		20,781	52.91			
Registered electors		39,276				
Independent hold on 1st iteration						
Independent hold on 1st iteration						
Independent hold on 15th iteration						
^{†} incumbent

=== Central general ward ===
Central general ward
Party	Candidate	Primary votes	%	±%	Iteration	
Party	Candidate	Primary votes	%	±%	#	Votes
Independent	Pete Rainey	2,661	25.43	(new)	1st	2,661
Independent	Aaron Stallard	2,518	24.07	(new)	1st	2,518
Independent	Matty Anderson	1,309	12.51	(new)	3rd	1,849
Citizens	James Hodgson	778	7.44	(new)	13th	1,672
Citizens	Peter Win	883	8.44	(new)	13th	1,507
Citizens	Cleo Cowdrey	470	4.49	(new)	10th	807
Citizens	Murray Cameron	424	4.05	(new)	9th	562
Independent	Sean Davis	250	2.39	(new)	6th	319
Independent	Dai Mitchell	154	1.47	(new)	5th	202
Quota		1,889	18.06	n/a		
Informal votes		326	3.12	n/a		
Blank votes		689	6.59	n/a		
Turnout		10,462	56.30	n/a		
Registered electors		18,582				
Independent win (new seat) on 1st iteration						
Independent win (new seat) on 1st iteration						
Independent win (new seat) on 3rd iteration						
Independent win (new seat) on 13th iteration						

=== Stoke-Tāhunanui general ward ===
Stoke-Tāhunanui general ward
Party	Candidate	Primary votes	%	±%	Iteration	
Party	Candidate	Primary votes	%	±%	#	Votes
Independent	Mel Courtney	2,381	22.76	(new)	1st	2,661
Independent	Campbell Rollo	1,138	10.88	(new)	11th	1,857
Independent	Trudie Brand	952	9.10	(new)	13th	1,743
Independent	Matthew Benge	762	7.28	(new)	18th	1,583
Independent	Ian Barker	835	7.98	(new)	18th	1,556
Independent	Valmai Palatchie	578	5.52	(new)	12th	1,018
Independent	Harvey Ruru	635	6.07	(new)	10th	813
Independent	Allan Hoult	491	4.69	(new)	8th	727
Citizens	Mike Gane	485	4.64	(new)	6th	583
Citizens	Harry Pearson	452	4.32	(new)	5th	500
Independent	Sarah Minchington	163	1.56	(new)	4th	192
Independent	Rhys Bromell	142	1.36	(new)	3rd	157
Independent	Lyndell Dodunski	97	0.93	(new)	2nd	104
Quota		1,822	18.38	n/a		
Informal votes		271	2.73	n/a		
Blank votes		533	5.38	n/a		
Turnout		9,915	53.36	n/a		
Registered electors		19,026				
Independent win (new seat) on 1st iteration						
Independent win (new seat) on 1st iteration						
Independent win (new seat) on 3rd iteration						
Independent win (new seat) on 13th iteration						

=== Whakatū Māori ward ===
Whakatū Māori ward
Party	Candidate	Primary votes	%	±%	Iteration	
Party	Candidate	Primary votes	%	±%	#	Votes
Independent	Kahu Paki Paki	240	59.41	(new)	1st	240
Independent	Bernie Goldsmith	125	30.94	(new)	1st	125
Quota		183	45.30	n/a		
Informal votes		6	1.49	n/a		
Blank votes		33	8.17	n/a		
Turnout		404	24.22	n/a		
Registered electors		1,668				
Independent win (new seat) on 1st iteration						
