= 2016 Nelson mayoral election =

Local election in New Zealand

- 8 October 2016
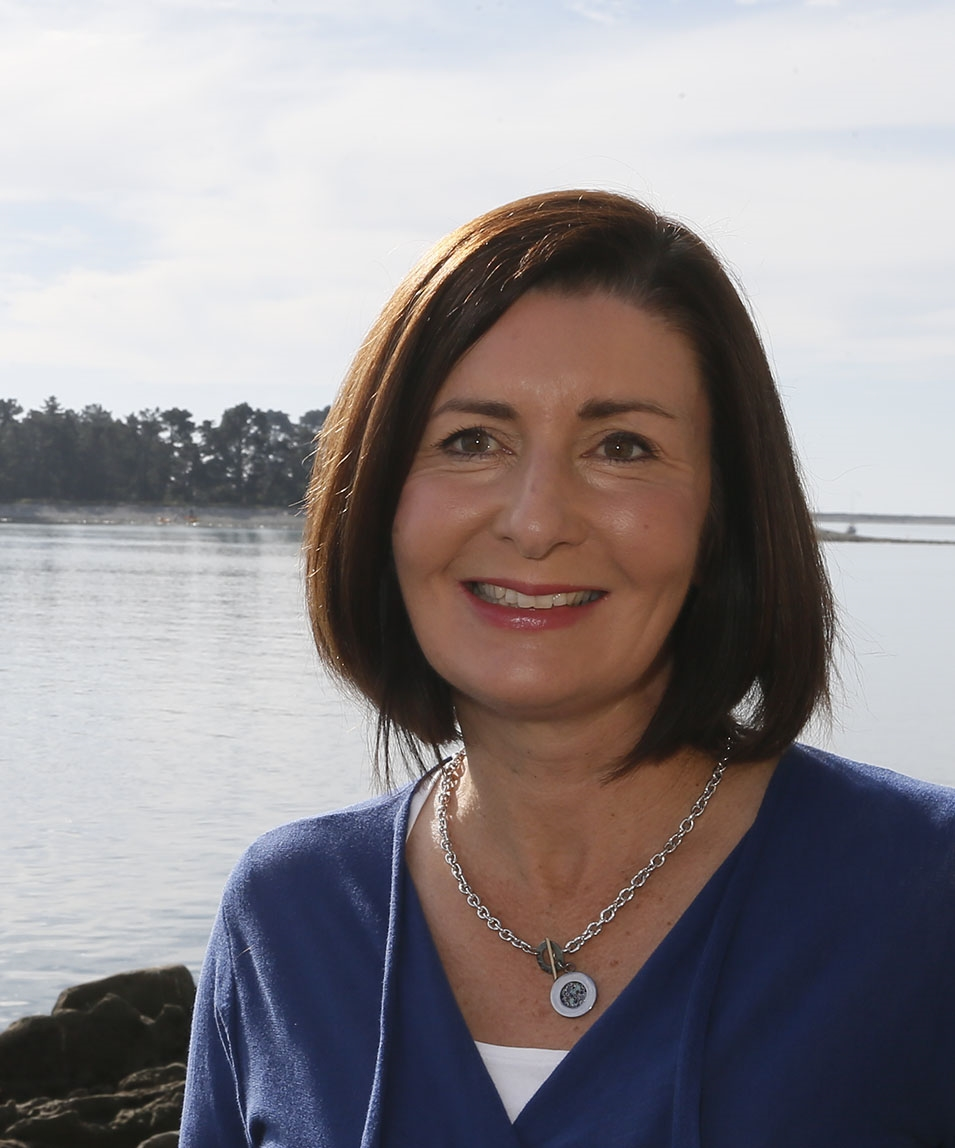
Candidate	Rachel Reese	Pete Rainey	Graeme O'Brien
Party	Independent		Independent
Popular vote	11,364	5,050	1,871
Percentage	60.74%	26.99%	10.00%
Mayor before election
Rachel Reese
Elected mayor
Rachel Reese

The 2016 Nelson mayoral election was part of the New Zealand local elections that were held on 8 October 2016 to elect the Mayor of Nelson, New Zealand.

== Results ==
2016 Nelson mayoral election
Party	Candidate	Votes	%	±%
Independent	Rachel Reese	11,364	60.74	+16.50
None	Pete Rainey	5,050	26.99	
Independent	Graeme O'Brien	1,871	10.00	
Money Free Party	Richard Osmaston	422	2.25	+0.29
Total valid votes		18,707	99.82	
Informal votes		33	0.17	+0.05
Majority		6,314	33.75	+25.58
Turnout		18,740		
