= Richard Harden =

Richard Harden may refer to:

- Richard Harden (cricketer) (born 1965), English cricketer
- Richard Harden (politician) (1916–2000), Northern Irish politician
- Rich Harden (born 1981), Canadian baseball pitcher
