= 2022 Tasman District Council election =

Local election in New Zealand

- 8 October 2022
- Mayoral election
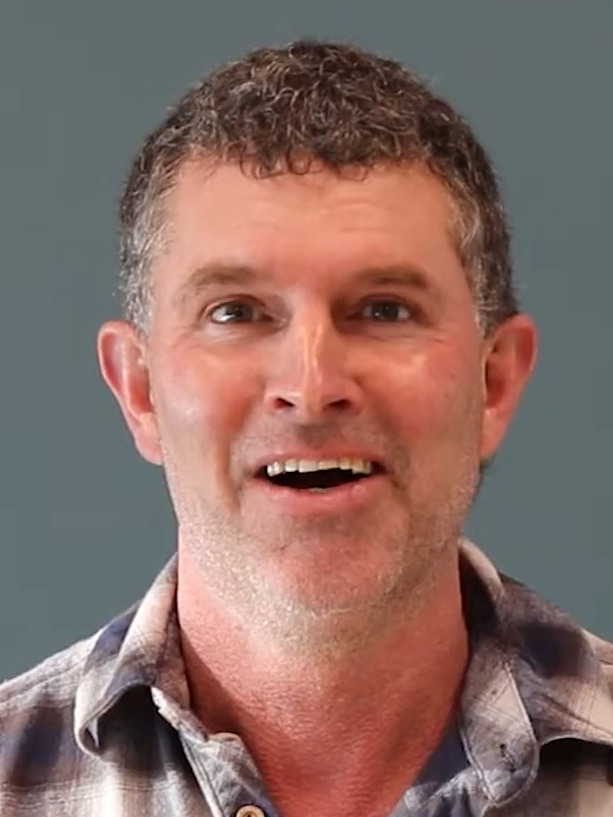

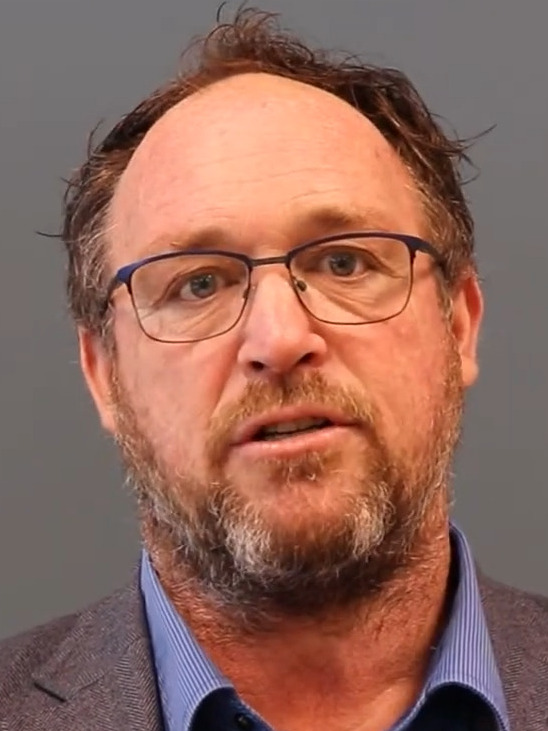

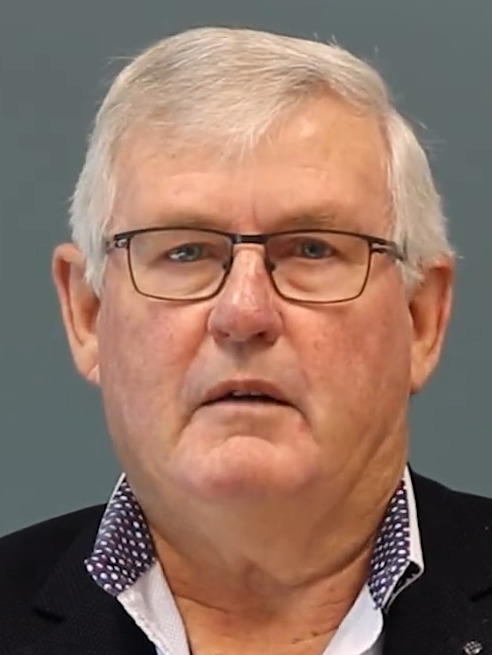

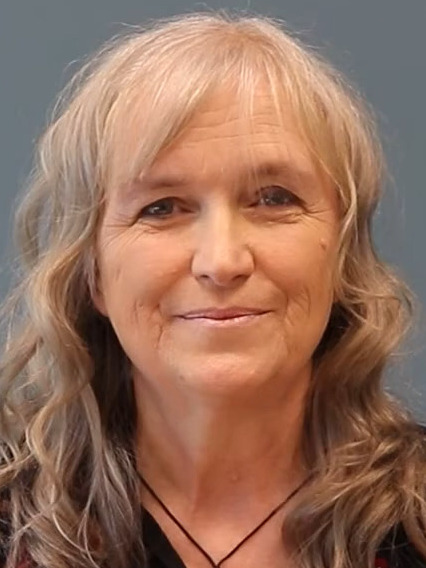
Candidate	Tim King	Mike Harvey
Affiliation	Independent	Independent
Popular vote	12,164	2,926
Percentage	58.53%	14.08%
Candidate	Maxwell Clark	Aly Cook
Affiliation	Independent	Outdoors
Popular vote	2,689	2,239
Percentage	12.94%	10.77%
Mayor before election
Tim King
Independent
Elected mayor
Tim King
Independent
- Council election
- 13 seats on the Tasman District Council; 8 seats needed for a majority
Party	Seats	+/–
Independent	13	0
This lists parties that won seats. See the complete results below.

The 2022 Tasman District Council election was a local election held from 16 September until 8 October in the Tasman District of New Zealand as part of that year's nation-wide local elections. Voters elected the mayor of Tasman and 13 district councillors for the 2022–2025 term of the Tasman District Council. Postal voting and the first-past-the-post voting system were used.

== Results ==
=== Mayor ===
Incumbent mayor Tim King was re-elected to a second term, defeating Mike Harvey, Maxwell Clark (brother of invercargill mayor Nobby Clark), Aly Cook (a singer who ran as the candidate for the anti-vax NZ Outdoors & Freedom Party), and Richard Osmaston. King had first been elected to Tasman District Council as a councillor in the 1998 New Zealand local elections.

2022 Tasman mayoral election
Party	Candidate	Votes	%	±%
Independent	Tim King^{†}	12,164	58.82	
Independent	Mike Harvey	2,926	14.15	(new)
Independent	Maxwell Clark	2,689	13.00	
Outdoors	Aly Cook	2,239	10.83	(new)
Money Free	Richard Osmaston	242	1.17	(new)
Informal votes		21	0.10	
Blank votes		400	1.93	
Turnout		20,681	49.79	
Registered electors		41,536		
Independent hold				
^{†} incumbent

=== Golden Bay ward ===
The two incumbents in the Golden Bay ward, Chris Hill and Celia Butler, were re-elected with large majorities. Phil Smith had withdrawn from the contest after the nominations closed, hence his name did appear on the voting forms.

Golden Bay ward
Party	Candidate	Votes	%	±%
Independent	Chris Hill^{†}	1,691	71.56	
Independent	Celia Butler^{†}	1,625	68.77	
Independent	Quinn Lake	526	22.26	(new)
Independent	James Wolfen-Duvall	486	20.57	(new)
Independent	Phil Smith	50	2.12	(new)
Informal votes		2	0.08	
Blank votes		32	1.35	
Turnout		2,363	54.38	
Registered electors		4,345		
Independent hold				
Independent hold				
^{†} incumbent

=== Lakes–Murchison ward ===
In the Lakes–Murchison ward, Stuart Bryant was successful. He had first been elected as a Tasman District councillor in a June 1999 by-election following the death of councillor Murray Borlase. There were four candidates for the single seat available, with Bryant's closest challenger, Dean McNamara, gaining fewer than half of his votes. McNamara was an incumbent councillor who had represented the Moutere–Waimea ward in the previous two terms.

Affiliation	Candidate	Votes	%
None	Stuart Bryant	711	50.04
No to 3 Waters and irresponsible debt	Dean McNamara	330	23.22
None	Sharon Rogers	253	17.80
None	Richard Osmaston	88	6.19
Informal		2	0.14
Blank		33	2.32
Turnout		1,421	

=== Moutere–Waimea ward ===
In the Moutere–Waimea ward, six candidates contested three available seats. Christeen MacKenzie was the only incumbent returned alongside two newcomers.

Affiliation	Candidate	Votes	%
None	Christeen MacKenzie	3,522	61.27
None	Dan Shallcrass	2,655	46.19
Independent	Mike Kininmonth	2,411	41.95
Local Democracy & Public Service	Jono Trolove	2,061	35.86
None	Kelvin Woodley	1,446	25.16
Common Sense	Dan Robinson	1,405	24.44
Informal		4	0.07
Blank		153	2.55
Turnout		5,748	

=== Motueka ward ===
In the Motueka ward, Trindi Walker and Barry Dowler were incumbent councillors who were re-elected. The poll was topped by Brent Maru, who had previously chaired the Motueka Community Board. A further five candidates had contested this ward.

Affiliation	Candidate	Votes	%
None	Brent Maru	3,035	64.22
None	Trindi Walker	2,119	44.84
None	Barry Dowler	1,892	40.03
Independent	Ian Palmer	1,666	35.25
Independent	Richard Brown	1,369	28.97
Putting People First	Nick Hughes	933	19.74
Upholding integrity	Terina Graham	844	17.86
None	Barbara Lewando	588	12.44
Informal		14	0.30
Blank		45	0.95
Turnout		4,726	

=== Richmond ward ===
In the Richmond ward, there were four vacancies contested by ten candidates. Kit Maling and Mark Greening were two incumbents who got re-elected, joined by two newcomers. Joni Tomsett, who had previously served one term on the Motueka Community Board, just missed out on a seat, being 21 votes behind the fourth-placed candidate. Tomsett was the youngest candidate; she turned 29 on election day.

Affiliation	Candidate	Votes	%
Independent	Kit Maling	4,139	63.43
None	Jo Ellis	2,504	38.38
Sensible, Ethical and Open	Mark Greening	2,257	34.59
None	Glen Daikee	2,151	32.97
None	Joni Tomsett	2,130	32.64
None	Rachel Stevenson	2,038	31.23
None	Maxwell Clark	1,962	30.07
Community focused governance	Ray Griffith	1,572	24.09
None	Tim Tyler	1,545	23.68
Common sense local governance	Adele Terrill	1,340	20.54
Informal		10	0.15
Blank		142	2.18
Turnout		6,525	

By June 2025, councillors Stuart Bryant and Barry Dowler had both announced that they would not seek re-election at the 2025 local elections.

== Community boards ==
There was no election for the Golden Bay Community Board, as the number of nominations (four) matched the number of seats available.

=== Summary ===
Board	Incumbent	Elected
Motueka	Brent Maru	Nick Hughes
Motueka	Richard Charles Horrell	Claire Hutt
Motueka	Joni Tomsett	Terina Graham
Motueka	David Armstrong	
Golden Bay	Dave Gowland	Henry Dixon (Note: Elected unopposed)
Golden Bay	Averill Grant	Robert Hewison
Golden Bay	Grant Knowles	
Golden Bay	Abbie Langford	

=== Details ===
Motueka Community Board
Affiliation	Candidate	Votes	%
None	Brent Maru (Note: Withdrawn, elected as district councillor)	3,326	70.38
None	David Armstrong	2,170	45.92
Putting People First	Nick Hughes	1,736	36.73
None	Claire Hutt	1,533	32.44
Community minded	Terina Graham	1,246	26.36
None	Dana Carter	1,197	25.33
None	Tania Corbett	996	21.07
Independent	Barbara Lewando	783	16.57
Independent	Margaret McCallum	544	11.51
None	Ellie Kamphuis	476	10.07
None	Charmaine Petereit	341	7.22
Informal		3	0.06
Blank		94	2.00
Turnout		4,726	
