= 2025 Nelson City Council election =

Elections in New Zealand

- 11 October 2025
- Turnout: 18,789 (48.59% ▼4.62 pp)
- Mayor
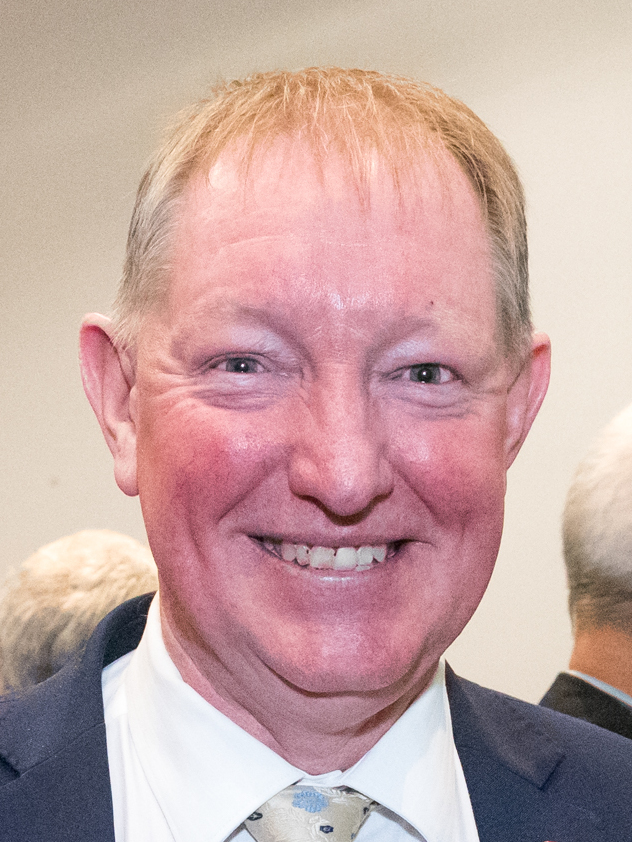
		Ind
Candidate	Nick Smith	Aaron Stallard
Party	Independent	Independent
Primary vote	10,957	6,898
Percentage	58.32%	36.71%
Mayor before election
Nick Smith
Independent
Elected mayor
Nick Smith
Independent
- Councillors
- 12 seats on the governing body of Nelson City Council; 7 seats needed for a majority
Party	Seats	+/–
Independent	11	+2
Labour	1	+1
This lists parties that won seats. See the complete results below.
Control before	Control after
No majority	No majority

The 2025 Nelson City Council election was a local election held from 9 September to 11 October in Nelson, New Zealand, as part of that year's territorial authority elections and other local elections held nation-wide.

Voters elected the mayor of Nelson and 12 city councillors for the 2025–2028 term of the Nelson City Council. Postal voting and the single transferable voting system were used in two four-seat wards, an at-large three-seat contest and two single-winner contests (for mayor and Maori member).

Incumbent mayor Nick Smith won re-election to a second term.

The council introduced a Māori ward at the 2022 election; in a referendum on its future held at this election (as part of a nation-wide series of referendums) voters elected to keep the Māori ward.

== Key dates ==
- 4 July 2025: Nominations for candidates opened
- 1 August 2025: Nominations for candidates closed at 12 pm
- 9 September 2025: Voting documents were posted and voting opened
- 11 October 2025: Voting closed at 12 pm and progress/preliminary results were published
- 16–19 October 2025: Final results were declared.

== Background ==
=== Positions up for election ===
Voters in the city elected the mayor of Nelson and 12 city councillors in 4 separate contests (three in wards and one at-large).

== List of candidates ==
=== Incumbents not seeking re-election ===
- Matthew Benge, incumbent councillor
- Rohan O'Neill-Stevens, deputy mayor since 2022 and councillor since 2019
- Rachel Sanson, incumbent councillor

=== Mayor ===
Candidate	Photo	Affiliation (Note: A candidate may leave their affiliation blank, run as an independent, or run with an affiliation to an organisation, local body ticket or political party. Nelson City Council does not allow whānau, hapū, or iwi details to be used for the affiliation.)	Notes
Richard Osmaston		Money Free Party New Zealand	Previously ran for the mayoralties of Westland, Grey, Buller, Marlborough, Nelson, and Tasman in 2022. Concurrently ran for the mayoralties of four other councils: Tasman, Buller, Grey and Westland.
Nick Smith		Independent	Incumbent mayor since 2022
Aaron Stallard		Independent	Incumbent councillor since 2022. Also ran for re-election as a councillor in the at-large ward.
John Wakelin		Lower Rates	Previously ran for the mayoralty in 2019 and 2022

=== Councillors ===
==== Whakatū Māori ward ====
Whakatū Māori ward returned one councillor to the city council.

Candidate	Affiliation	Notes
Kahu Paki Paki	None	Incumbent councillor

==== Central ward ====
The Central ward returned four councillors to the city council.

Candidate	Photo	Affiliation	Notes
Matty Anderson		Independent	Incumbent councillor
Lisa Austin		Let's Be Ready for Tomorrow – Today	
Lenny Blake		None	
Jackie Galland		None	
James Hodgson		Independent	Incumbent councillor
Anton Hyman		None	
Marie Lindaya		Weaving a Stronger Nelson for 2025	
Sand McDougall		Independent	
David North		None	
Steph Phillips		Independent	
Pete Rainey		Independent	Incumbent councillor
Tilman Ward		Independent	
Mike Ward		None	Previously ran for council in 2022

==== Stoke-Tāhunanui ward ====
The Stoke-Tāhunanui ward returned four councillors to the city council.

Candidate	Photo	Affiliation	Notes
Trudie Brand		None	Incumbent councillor
Guy Coulson		None	Scientist (air quality)
Mel Courtney		Independent	Incumbent councillor
Sarah Kerby		Labour	
Paul Lacy		None	
Mike Nicholls		Independent	
Valmai Palatchie		Independent	
Dan Robinson		Independent	
Campbell Rollo		Independent	Incumbent councillor

==== At-large ward ====
Three councillors were elected at-large to the city council.

Candidate	Photo	Affiliation	Notes
Chris Baillie		Independent	Former ACT MP (2020–2023)
Anne Michele Dickinson		None	
Susa Guhl		Independent	
Jeremy Matthews		None	
Keith Palmer		None	
Nigel Skeggs		Independent	
Tim Skinner		None	Incumbent councillor
Aaron Stallard		Independent	Incumbent councillor since 2022. Also ran for mayor.
Graeme K Tyree		Independent	

== Results ==
Overall turnout for the election was 48.14%, with 18,789 voting papers returned.

With the final results, the following candidates were declared elected:

=== Mayor ===
Incumbent mayor Nick Smith won re-election to a second-term.

2025 Nelson mayoral election
Party	Candidate	Primary votes	%	±%	Iteration	
Party	Candidate	Primary votes	%	±%	#	Votes
Independent	Nick Smith^{†}	10,957	58.32	+12.47	1st	10,957
Independent	Aaron Stallard	6,898	36.71	(new)	1st	6,898
Independent	John Wakelin	308	1.64	+1.36	1st	308
Money Free	Richard Osmaston	288	1.53	+1.10	1st	288
Quota		9,226	49.10	−109.11		
Informal votes		23	0.12	−0.36		
Blank votes		315	1.68	+0.12		
Turnout		18,789	48.59	−4.62		
Registered electors		38,665				
Independent hold on 1st iteration						
^{†} incumbent

=== Council ===
==== At-large ward ====
2025 Nelson at-large election
Party	Candidate	Primary votes	%	±%	Iteration	
Party	Candidate	Primary votes	%	±%	#	Votes
Independent	Aaron Stallard	5,633	29.98	(new)	1st	5,633
Independent	Tim Skinner^{†}	3,529	18.78	−5.14	7th	4,600
Independent	Nigel Skeggs	2,388	12.71	(new)	8th	4,271
Independent	Chris Baillie	2,360	12.56	(new)	8th	3,465
Independent	Susa Guhl	1,344	7.15	(new)	6th	2,250
Independent	Anne Michele Dickinson	1,000	5.32	(new)	5th	1,366
Independent	Jeremy Matthews	800	4.26	(new)	4th	890
Independent	Keith Palmer	447	2.38	(new)	3rd	529
Independent	Graeme K Tyree	251	1.34	(new)	2nd	538
Quota		4,438	23.62	+0.40		
Informal votes		331	1.76	+0.16		
Blank votes		706	3.76	−1.21		
Turnout		18,789	48.59	−4.62		
Registered electors		38,665				
Independent gain from Independent Green on 1st iteration						
Independent hold on 7th iteration						
Independent gain from Independent Green on 8th iteration						
^{†} incumbent

==== Central general ward ====
2025 Central general ward election
Party	Candidate	Primary votes	%	±%	Iteration	
Party	Candidate	Primary votes	%	±%	#	Votes
Independent	Lisa Austin	1,767	19.07	(new)	1st	1,767
Independent	Pete Rainey^{†}	1,486	16.04	−9.25	9th	1,768
Independent	James Hodgson^{†}	1,137	12.27	+4.88	12th	1,688
Independent	Matty Anderson^{†}	1,215	13.11	(new)	13th	1,711
Independent	Steph Phillips	1,001	10.80	(new)	13th	1,487
Independent	Marie Lindaya	477	5.15	(new)	11th	650
Independent	David North	435	4.69	(new)	10th	571
Independent	Mike Ward	484	5.22	(new)	8th	518
Independent	Lenny Blake	340	3.67	(new)	6th	387
Independent	Tilman Walk	158	1.71	(new)	5th	170
Independent	Sand McDougall	124	1.34	(new)	4th	132
Independent	Jackie Galland	121	1.31	(new)	3rd	122
Independent	Anton Hyman	28	0.30	(new)	1st	28
Quota		1,755	18.94	+0.99		
Informal votes		176	1.90	−1.20		
Blank votes		315	3.40	−3.15		
Turnout		9,266	51.30	−5.34		
Registered electors		18,063				
Independent gain from Independent on 1st iteration						
Independent hold on 9th iteration						
Independent gain from Citizens on 12th iteration						
Independent hold on 13th iteration						
^{†} incumbent

==== Stoke-Tāhunanui general ward ====
2025 Stoke-Tāhunanui general ward election
Party	Candidate	Primary votes	%	±%	Iteration	
Party	Candidate	Primary votes	%	±%	#	Votes
Independent	Campbell Rollo^{†}	1,972	21.78	+10.36	1st	1,972
Independent	Mel Courtney^{†}	1,941	21.44	−2.46	1st	1,941
Labour	Sarah Kerby	1,445	15.96	(new)	7th	1,829
Independent	Trudie Brand^{†}	1,045	11.54	+1.98	10th	1,624
Independent	Balmai Palatchie	598	6.60	+0.80	10th	1,093
Independent	Mike Nicholls	586	6.47	(new)	9th	930
Independent Green	Guy Coulson	487	5.38	(new)	6th	545
Independent	Dan Robinson	262	2.89	(new)	5th	330
Independent	Paul Lacy	249	2.75	(new)	4th	278
Quota		1,717	18.96	+0.67		
Informal votes		185	2.04	−0.68		
Blank votes		285	3.15	−2.20		
Turnout		9,055	47.89	−4.48		
Registered electors		18,907				
Independent hold on 1st iteration						
Independent hold on 1st iteration						
Labour gain from Independent on 7th iteration						
Independent hold on 10th iteration						
^{†} incumbent

==== Whakatū Māori ward ====
2025 Whakatu Māori ward election
Party	Candidate	Primary votes	%	±%	Iteration	
Party	Candidate	Primary votes	%	±%	#	Votes
Independent	Kahu Paki Paki^{†}	elected unopposed				
Registered electors		1,695				
Independent hold on 1st iteration						
^{†} incumbent

=== Māori ward poll ===
Choice	Votes	%
I vote to KEEP Māori wards	10,168	57.26
I vote to REMOVE Māori wards	7,590	42.74
Total	17,758	100.00
Valid votes	17,758	94.51
Invalid/blank votes	1,031	5.49
Total votes	18,789	100.00

== See also ==
- 2025 Tasman District Council election
