= 1989 Tasman District Council elections =

Local elections in New Zealand

- 29 March and 14 October 1989
- Mayoral election
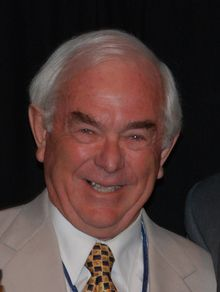
Candidate	Kerry Marshall
Affiliation	Independent
Popular vote	?
Elected mayor
Kerry Marshall
Independent
- Council election
- 16 seats on the Tasman District Council; 9 seats needed for a majority
Party	Seats	+/–
Independent	16	+16
This lists parties that won seats. See the complete results below.

The 1989 Tasman District Council elections were local elections held on 29 March and 14 October in the Tasman District of New Zealand, as part of that year's territorial authority elections and other local elections held nation-wide. These were the inaugural elections for the Tasman District Council, newly established as part of the 1989 reforms to local government.

Voters initially elected the mayor of Tasman and fourteen councillors in March, and later elected two more councillors and community board members in October. All elected members served until the 1992 elections.

== Background ==
Tasman District Council was formed on 1 April 1989.

The Local Government Commission had established Tasman District with six wards and two community boards – at the time called "ward committees". There were to be sixteen district councillors elected across the wards, and one mayor at-large. The wards were Lakes, Richmond, Waimea, Moutere, Motueka, and Golden Bay. Community boards were established for the two latter wards, with six members each plus the ward councillors.

== Elections ==
The election were held in two stages as there had been ongoing discussions whether Golden Bay should become part of Tasman District. Also, the establishment of community boards was not part of the initial discussions. A mayor and fourteen councillors were elected on 29 March 1989 from five wards: Lakes, Richmond, Waimea, Moutere, and Motueka. Those members were to hold office until the October 1992 local elections.

The two Golden Bay councillors were elected on 14 October 1989. At that time, the council's two community boards—Golden Bay and Motueka, with six members each plus the ward councillors—were also elected.

=== Mayoral election ===
There were five mayoral candidates:

- Ted Krammer, who had previously stood for parliament for the National Party.
- Betty McCallum, who stood on a platform of community-led governance.
- Kerry Marshall, who had been mayor of Richmond Borough since 1986 and who chaired the Tasman District Council transition committee.
- Dick Sanders, a partner in a civil engineering consultancy and a member of the Nelson Chamber of Commerce.
- Gwyn Thurlow, a returned serviceman and farmer.

Marshall was the successful mayoral candidate.

=== March 1989 ward elections ===
There were three candidates for the two available positions in the Waimea ward:

- Bob Croy – elected
- Ross Stratford – not elected
- Colleen Twin – elected

In the Lakes ward, Ted Krammer was elected and he served as deputy mayor during the term.

Elaine Henry was elected in the Richmond ward.

In the Moutere ward, Murray Ruddenklau was elected.

In the Motueka ward, district councillors were Elaine Taylor, Kate Light, and John Krammer.

=== October 1989 ward and community board elections ===
As part of the nationwide poll on 14 October 1989, the remaining two councillors were elected in the Golden Bay ward. In addition, the two community boards were elected in the Golden Bay and Motueka wards, with six representatives for each board. Three candidates contested the two available district council seats in the Golden Bay ward. Two of those—Ann Lewis and Harry Holmwood—had been appointed to represent Golden Bay on Tasman District Council prior to the October elections:

- Paul Sangster – 1,256 votes – elected
- Ann Lewis – 1,194 votes – elected
- Harry Holmwood – 1,160 votes – not elected

Nine candidates contested the six Golden Bay Community Board positions:

- Paul Sangster – 1,594 votes – elected
- Jock Lill – 1,490 votes – elected
- June Washbourn – 1,086 votes – elected
- Ann Castle – 902 votes – elected
- Andy Clark – 702 votes – elected
- David James – 665 votes – elected
- Denis Schwass – 637 votes – not elected
- Richard Davies – 572 votes – not elected
- Henry James – 454 votes – not elected

Eight candidates contested the six Motueka Community Board positions:

- David Ogilvie – 3,073 – elected
- Mary Lafrentz – 2,476 – elected
- Miles Canton – 2,429 – elected
- Pat Burnett – 2,269 – elected
- Richard Horrell – 2,138 – elected
- Kelvin Bradley – 2,039 – elected
- Elizabeth Martin – 1,823 – not elected
- Evered Goodall – 1,811 – not elected
