= Aldo Miccio =

New Zealand politician (born c.1971)

Cataldo (Aldo) Miccio
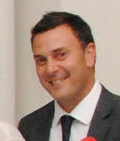
- Aldo Miccio, at the Suter Art Gallery fundraising auction, held at Government House, Wellington, on 19 April 2013.

28th Mayor of Nelson
- In office 2010–2013
- Preceded by: Kerry Marshall
- Succeeded by: Rachel Reese

Personal details
- Born: Cataldo Miccio c.1971 Nelson, New Zealand
- Education: University of Canterbury

Cataldo (Aldo) Miccio (born c.1971) is a New Zealand former local-body politician. He served one term as Mayor of Nelson from 2010 to 2013 and prior to that one term as a Nelson City councillor 2007 to 2010.

== Background ==
Miccio is married to Kimberley and has three children. He was born in Nelson, New Zealand, in 1971. He left New Zealand in 2016 and now resides on the Central Coast of Sydney, Australia.

== Career ==
In 1993 Miccio was chief representative officer in China for a multinational textile company, and in 1994 he became in inaugural member of the New Zealand Shanghai business forum.

Miccio moved to Australia and in 1995 became General Manager of the clothing division at an Australian giftware company. In 1998 he began his own clothing and giftware company, Bissi, which now has offices in Sydney, Melbourne, Hong Kong and Xiamen, China. In 2009 he sold Bissi to a Chinese company, but remains a Director. He met and married his wife while working in Australia.

He is also a Director of AAPI Limited, and his cousin Anthony Romano is the other Director of the company.

Miccio was a trustee of the Summit Nelson Tasman Rescue Helicopter until 2016, a founding member of the Nelson Bays Community Foundation, (Nelson's first community endowments trust), and Trustee and Deputy Chair of Nelson Tasman Hospice.

From August 2012 – July 2014 Miccio was Chairman and Co-Director of NZ Inc Shop, an entity offering exporters of New Zealand-made products the opportunity to sell their goods to China.

Miccio is a Director of Trafalgar Events, the entity responsible for bringing the first NRL trial match to Nelson's Trafalgar Park (between New Zealand Vodafone Warriors and St George Illawarra Dragons). Following this event, Trafalgar Events hosted the first A league football match in Nelson: Wellington Phoenix versus Central Coast Mariners. Trafalgar Events was also behind a new Nelson festival, SNAPAFEST, combining seafood, music and arts, with the inaugural event taking place in September 2016.

He was appointed General Manager at Cooper Watkinson Textiles in October 2014, and in 2017 became Managing Director at Kela Charms Pty Ltd.

== Political career ==
Miccio returned to Nelson in 2002 and became a Nelson City Councillor in 2007 (serving one term) and was elected mayor in 2010 at the age of 39. He was defeated by Rachel Reese at the next election in 2013.

=== Contribution to the 2011 Rugby World Cup ===
Whilst serving as a Nelson City Councillor Miccio was instrumental in securing three Rugby World Cup 2011 matches for the city and did much of the groundwork to ensure the Italian Rugby World Cup team were hosted in Nelson during the event. His success was underpinned by a mention in Martin Snedden's book, A Stadium of 4 Million.

During the Rugby World Cup 2011, Miccio launched Hug an Aussie Day to coincide with the Australian RWC team's arrival in Nelson. The initiative was a response to a perceived atmosphere of antipathy towards Australians brought on by the tournament. The initiative was a huge PR success bringing international TV coverage to the small New Zealand city of Nelson.

=== Contribution to National League Football in Nelson ===
During his time as Nelson's mayor, Miccio was part of the consortium which brought National League Football to Nelson. As the Nelson Falcons Founder and Club Chairman, Miccio helped propel the team to take part in a national final in their second season, having won eight games in a row. In the early 2014 season they were beaten finalists, in the late 2014 season they were champions.

A keen sportsman, Miccio also took part in the charity boxing match, Fight for Victory, whilst he was mayor, and provided a personal grant to help facilitate educational opportunities for promising children at Victory Boxing in Nelson.

Under Miccio's leadership, Nelson City Council achieved much economic success and regional growth, including the following achievements:

- Developed and consulted with the public on the Framing our Future Vision for Nelson 2060
- Brought cruise ships back to Nelson
- Hosted the Iwi Economic Development Summit
- Successfully implemented free parking Tuesdays
- Helped to facilitate the ultra fast broadband roll out
- Gifted land to help Nelson Housing Trust proceed with an affordable housing development at the Brook
- Completed purchase of Theatre Royal and Nelson School of Music
- Completed 2013 Trafalgar Park upgrade
- Approved funding for Trafalgar Centre
- Built the Saxton Field hockey and cricket pavilions and approved the proposed cycle velodrome
- Helped fund Kiwiflyer movie production costs
- Developed economic development opportunities with sister city, Huangshi
- Signed a new sister city Memorandum of Understanding to explore economic opportunities with Yangjiang
- Approved and began work on the Maitai Dam duplicate pipeline to Nelson city significantly increasing water security and the water volume that can be used from the dam
- Successfully bid for the rights to host at least two pool matches at the ICC Cricket World Cup in February 2015.
- Launched The Solar Promise, a nationwide campaign encouraging all NZ councils to embrace solar solutions and make it easier for their communities to go solar.
- Developed a proposal to set up contact centres in Nelson providing new job opportunities.

During his three-year term as mayor there was an average rates rise of just 3.6%, the lowest of any term in the preceding 20 years. Nelson City Council's debt rate was in the bottom 20% of all councils throughout New Zealand.

== Film ==
Miccio made a cameo appearance in the film Kiwi Flyer.

Political offices
Preceded by Kerry Marshall	Mayor of Nelson; 2010–2013	Succeeded by Rachel Reese
