= John Gully (cricketer) =

New Zealand cricketer (born 1957)

John Gully QSM
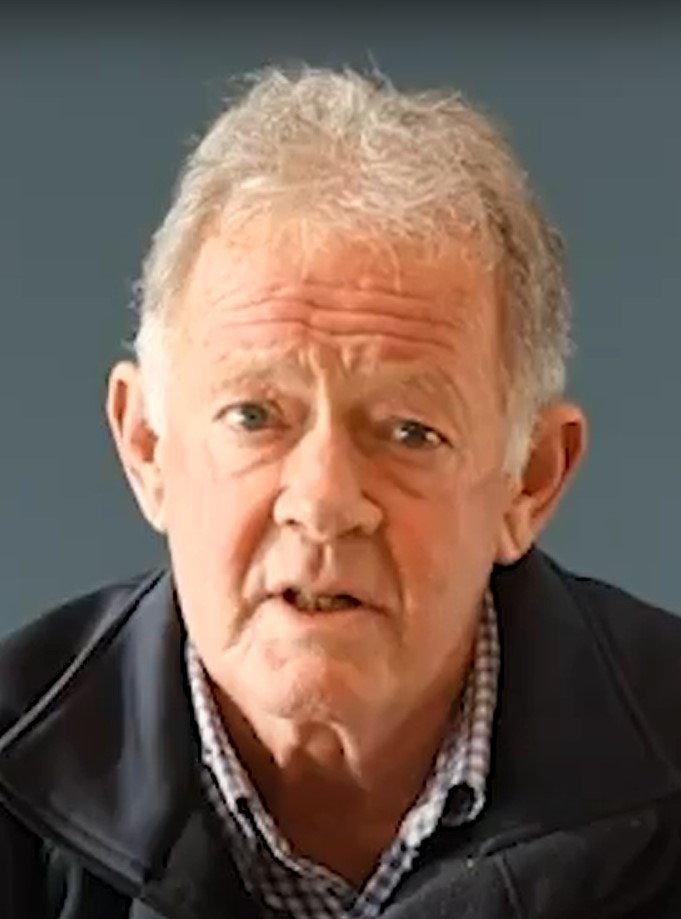
- Gully in 2025

Tasman District Councillor for the Lakes‑Murchison Ward
- Incumbent
- Assumed office 18 October 2025
- Preceded by: Stuart Bryant

Personal details
- Born: 15 July 1957 (age 69) Nelson, New Zealand
- Cricket career

Cricket information
- Batting: Right-handed
- Bowling: Right-arm medium

Domestic team information
- Years: Team
- 1982/83: Canterbury

Career statistics
Competition	First-class
Matches	3
Runs scored	53
Batting average	8.83
100s/50s	0/7
Top score	22
Balls bowled	0
Wickets	0
Bowling average	–
5 wickets in innings	0
10 wickets in match	0
Best bowling	–
Catches/stumpings	3/–
- Source: Cricinfo, 17 October 2020

John Gully QSM (born 15 July 1957) is a New Zealand local politician and former cricketer. He played in three first-class matches for Canterbury in the early 1980s. In the 2025 Tasman District Council election, he was elected as a district councillor to Tasman District Council.

== Biography ==
Gully was born in Nelson on 15 July 1957. He was educated at Nelson College from 1970 to 1974, where he was a prefect in his final year and active in sports. He played in the school's 1st XI cricket team from 1971 to 1974, the 1st XV rugby union team in 1974, and was junior athletics champion in 1972.

Gully played in three first-class matches for Canterbury in 1982/83.

In the 2013 New Year Honours, Gully received the Queen's Service Medal for services to New Zealand–Nepal relations.

Gully stood in the Lakes-Murchison ward in the 2025 Tasman District Council election and was returned as a district councillor.

== See also ==
- List of Canterbury representative cricketers
