= Rohan O'Neill-Stevens =

New Zealand politician (born 2000)

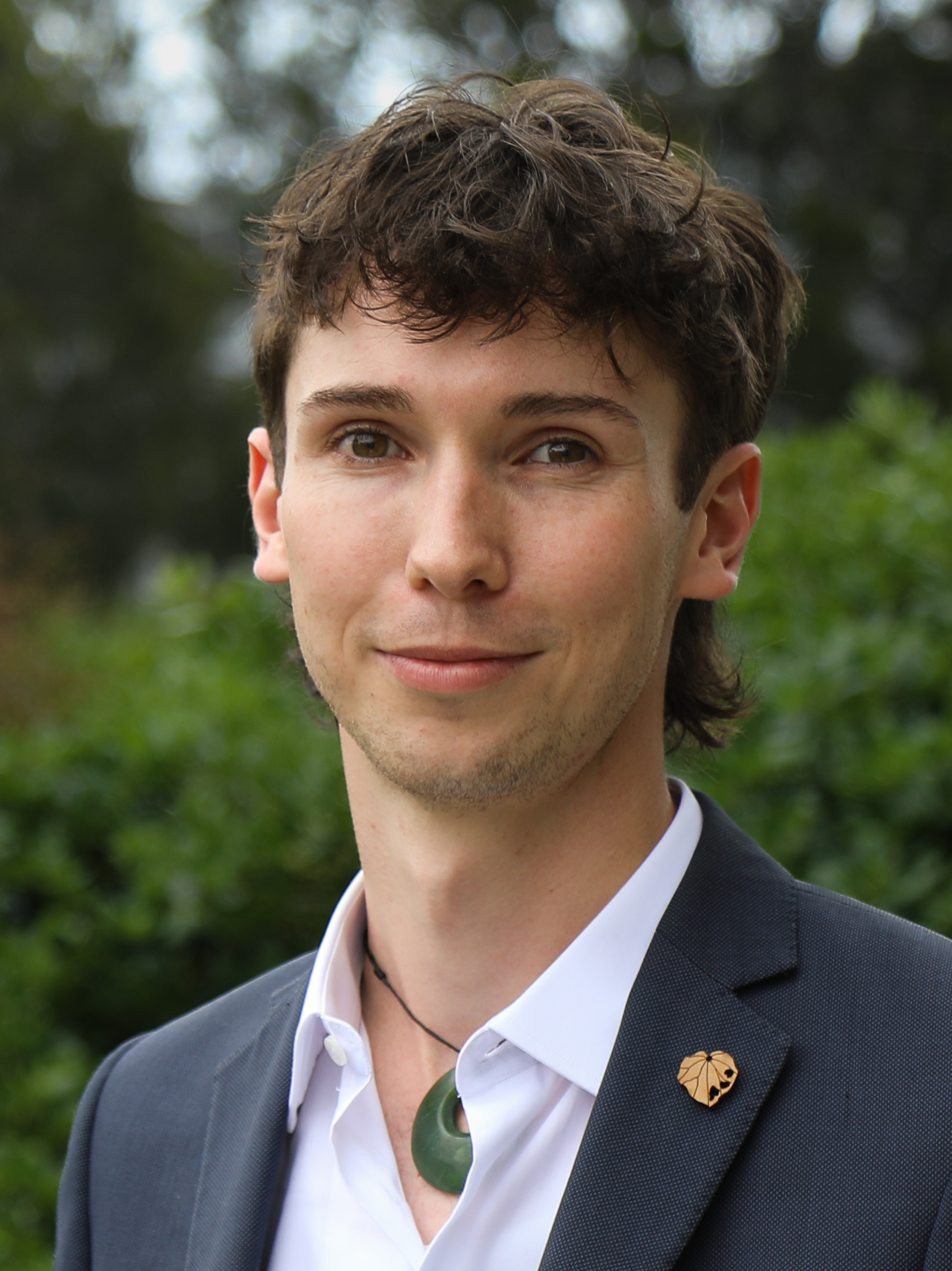
- O'Neill-Stevens in 2026

Member of the New Zealand Parliament for Green party list
- Incumbent
- Assumed office 7 November 2026

20th Deputy Mayor of Nelson
- In office 2022–2025
- Preceded by: Judene Edgar
- Succeeded by: Pete Rainey

Nelson City Councillor
- In office 2019–2025

Personal details
- Born: Rohan Tomas Sean O'Neill-Stevens; 2000 (age 25–26) Nelson, New Zealand

Rohan Tomas Sean O'Neill-Stevens (born 2000) is a New Zealand politician. He has been a Member of Parliament in the House of Representatives for the Green Party of Aotearoa New Zealand since 2026.

In 2019, he was elected to Nelson City Council as its youngest ever councillor, and was reelected in 2022. He did not seek reelection in 2025. He also served as deputy mayor of Nelson from 2022 to 2025.

He stood as the Green Party of Aotearoa New Zealand candidate in the electorate of Nelson for the 2026 general election. He convened their 2023 general election campaign, and previously served as the co-convenor of the party's youth wing.

== Early life and education ==
O'Neill-Stevens is of Māori and European descent, and is of Ngāti Apakura. In 2017, while studying at Nelson College he was awarded a scholarship to attend UWC Robert Bosch College in Germany.

== Political career ==
=== Nelson City Council ===
In the 2019 New Zealand local elections, O'Neill-Stevens was elected to the Nelson City Council, aged 19. O'Neill-Stevens campaigned on issues such as public transport improvements, youth engagement, and housing.

In the 2022 New Zealand local elections, O'Neill-Stevens ran for re-election and for mayor of Nelson, campaigning on three pillars: "a strong city, resilient communities, and healthy nature". He finished in third place for the mayoralty and was reelected as a councillor, as the highest polling At Large candidate. Following the election, O'Neill-Stevens was appointed deputy mayor by Mayor Nick Smith to "provide balance", with Smith highlighting their different political leanings.

While on Council, O'Neill-Stevens led the City Revitalisation Taskforce, overseeing the council's $78 million "Bridge to Better" project, served as Chair of the Arts and Creativity Taskforce and City Centre Business Forum, and as Deputy Chair of the District Licensing and Infrastructure committees. He also served as Co-Chair of Local Government New Zealand's Young Elected Members Committee and as President of Trafinz, the New Zealand Local Authority Traffic Institute.

In June 2025, O'Neill-Stevens announced he would not stand for reelection in the 2025 New Zealand local elections, citing a commitment to be in "the most effective position ... to drive change" and did not rule out a shift to central government. Mayor Nick Smith said he "disappointed for Nelson" that O'Neill-Stevens was not seeking reelection, calling his appointment as deputy mayor as one of his best decisions, and predicted O'Neill-Stevens would be elected to Parliament "sooner rather than later".

=== 2026 general election ===
New Zealand Parliament
Years	Term	Electorate	List	Party
2026–present	55th	List	16	Green

During the 2026 New Zealand general election, O'Neill-Stevens was ranked 16th on the Green Party list. He contested the Nelson electorate. On 7 November, O'Neill-Stevens came third place in the Nelson race, gaining 2,952 votes based on preliminary results. He was elected to the New Zealand Parliament on the Green Party list.

== Political positions ==
=== Housing ===
O'Neill-Stevens supports housing density, calling "subpar and unaffordable housing" a "stain" on New Zealand. He voted against Nelson City Council and Tasman District Council's Future Development Strategy for having "lowballed intensification" and failing to change the way council's approach urban planning.

In August 2023, O'Neill-Stevens was appointed to a Nelson City Council hearings panel as a resource management commissioner, to consider Plan Change 29, the council's controversial proposed housing intensification planning rule changes.

=== Transport ===
O'Neill-Stevens has advocated for public and active transport improvements, and in 2021, moved a motion for Nelson City Council to support free public transport for students, under-25s and community services card holders which was narrowly defeated.

=== Gambling ===
O'Neill-Stevens has spoken out against the harm of gaming machines, and in 2021, he moved a motion to adopt a sinking lid policy to reduce the number of machines in Nelson.

== Personal life ==
O'Neill-Stevens is queer.

In 2014, O'Neill-Stevens' older brother died after falling through a skylight at Wellington Cathedral.
