= 2025 Tasman District Council election =

Local election in New Zealand

- 11 October 2025
- Turnout: 20,183 (47.75 ▼2.29 pp)
- Mayor
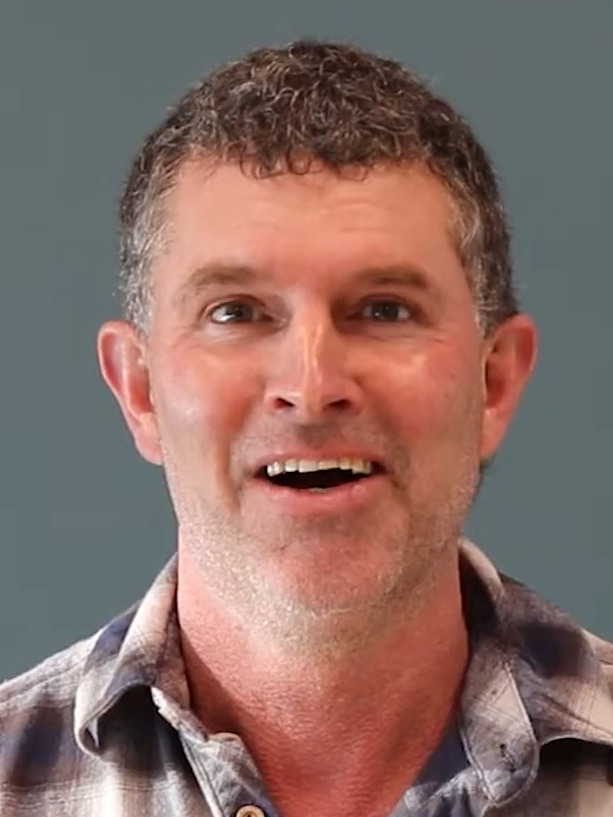

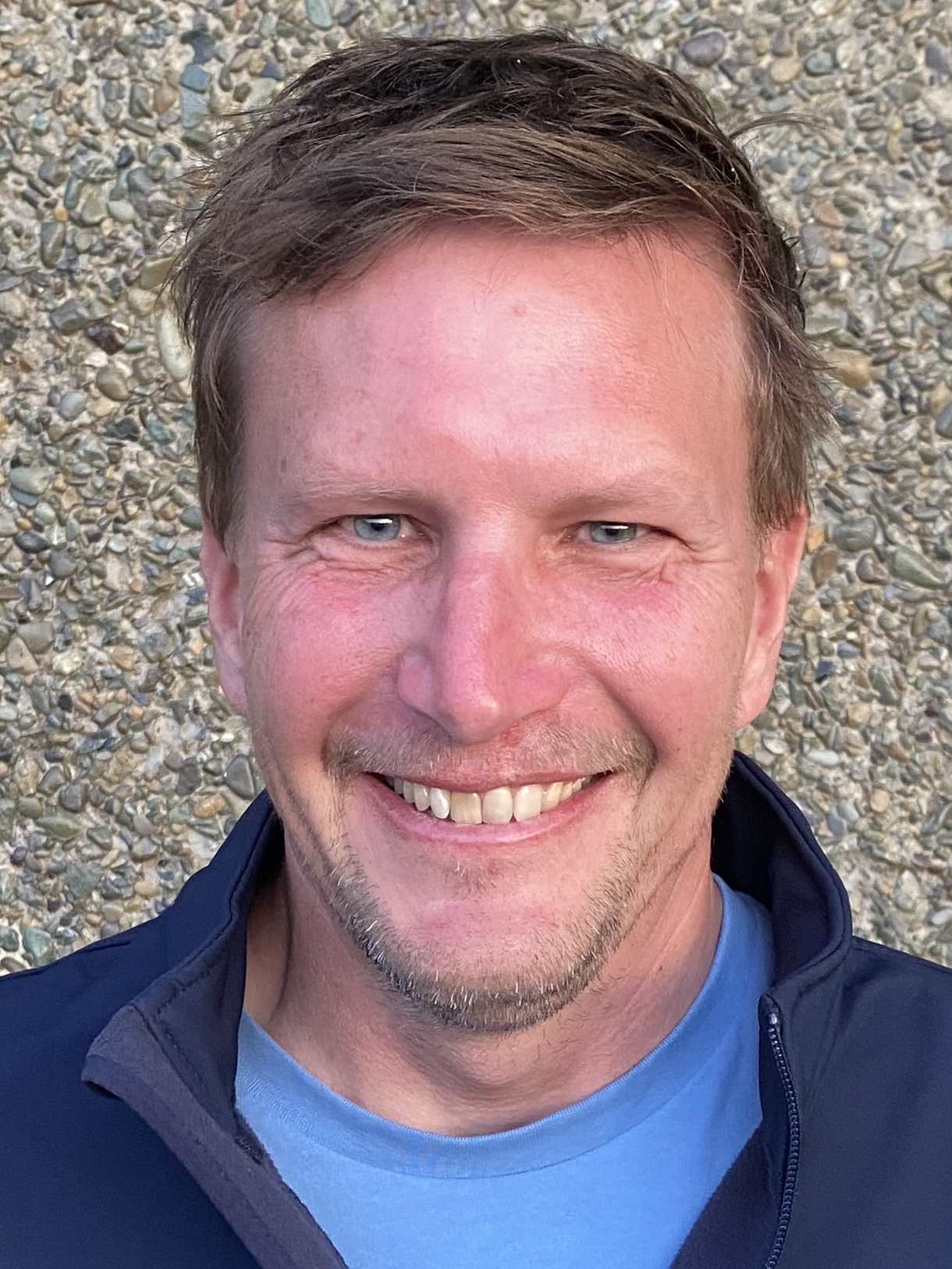

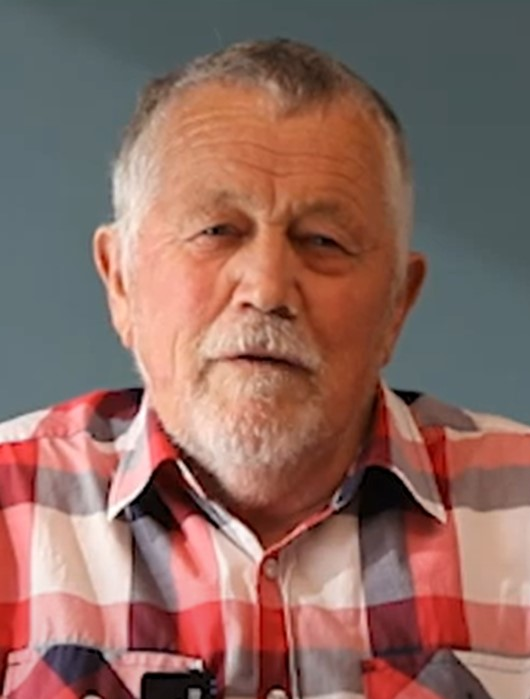

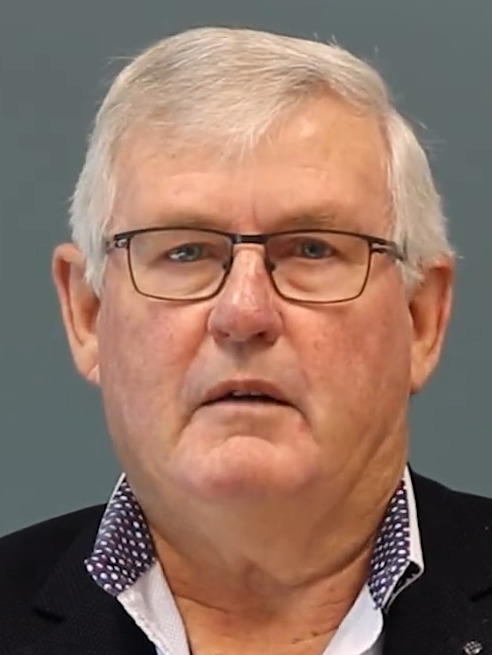
Candidate	Tim King	Timo Neubauer
Party	Independent	Independent
Popular vote	10,209	4,127
Percentage	50.58%	20.45%
Candidate	Richard Johns	Maxwell Clark
Party	Independent	Independent
Popular vote	3,931	1,220
Percentage	19.33%	6.04%
Mayor before election
Tim King
Independent
Elected mayor
Tim King
Independent
- Councillors
- 14 seats on the governing body of Tasman District Council; 8 seats needed for a majority
Party	Seats	+/–
Independent	12	−1
Sensible, Affordable and Ethical	2	+2
This lists parties that won seats. See the complete results below.
Control before	Control after
No majority	No majority

The 2025 Tasman District Council election was a local election held from 9 September to 11 October in the Tasman District of New Zealand, as part of that year's territorial authority elections and other local elections held nation-wide.

Voters elected the mayor of Tasman, 14 district councillors, and eight community board members for the 2025–2028 term of the Tasman District Council. Postal voting and the first-past-the-post voting system were used.

Incumbent mayor Tim King won re-election to a third term.

A Māori ward was introduced for this election, won by Paul Morgan who was unopposed. In a referendum on its future held at this election (as part of a nation-wide series of referendums) voters elected to remove the Māori ward for future elections.

== Key dates ==
The following key dates apply for the 2025 local election:

- 4 July 2025: Nominations for candidates opened
- 1 August 2025: Nominations for candidates closed at 12 noon
- 9 September 2025: Voting documents were posted and voting opened
- 11 October 2025: Voting closed at 12 noon and progress/preliminary results were published
- 17 October 2025: Final results were declared.

== Background ==
=== Positions up for election ===
Voters in the district elected the mayor of Tasman, 14 district councillors in 5 wards, and the members of two community boards (Golden Bay and Motueka).

The district has five geographical wards, which elect thirteen councillors: four councillors for Richmond, three for Moutere–Waimea, three for Motueka, two for Golden Bay, and one for Lakes–Murchison. The mayor and the one Māori ward councillor were elected at-large.

=== Representation ===
The council voted to establish a Māori ward for the 2025 local elections in 2023. The ward was named Te Tai o Aorere Māori and elected one councillor.

The government passed legislation in 2024 on Māori wards that requires councils to hold a binding referendum alongside the 2025 elections if they established Māori wards without holding a referendum; Council voted for the Māori ward to remain for the 2025 election.

The council consulted in 2024 whether the ward representation should change. The elected members decided to make one minor change, with the Totara View area located south of Wakefield shifting from the Lakes–Murchison ward to the Moutere–Waimea ward.

== List of candidates ==
=== Incumbents not seeking re-election ===
- Stuart Bryant (Lakes–Murchison ward), incumbent deputy mayor and district councillor since a June 1999 by-election, retired at the 2025 election.
- Barry Dowler, incumbent councillor for the Motueka ward
- Chris Hill, incumbent councillor for the Golden Bay ward
- Christeen Mackenzie, incumbent councillor for the Moutere / Waimea ward
- Dan Shallcrass, incumbent councillor for the Moutere / Waimea ward

=== Mayoral candidates ===
The first candidate for the mayoralty was Timo Neubauer, who declared his candidacy in early May 2025.

Candidate	Photo	Affiliation (Note: A candidate may leave their affiliation blank, run as an independent, or run with an affiliation to an organisation, local body ticket or political party. Tasman District Council does not allow election slogans to be used for the affiliation.)	Notes
Maxwell Clark		None	Brother of Invercargill mayor Nobby Clark. Previously ran for the mayoralty in 2013, 2016, 2019 and 2022. Also ran for mayor in Invercargill under the name Andrew Clark.
Richard Johns		None	Retiree, and third-time mayoral candidate
Tim King		None	Incumbent mayor since 2019
Timo Neubauer		Independent	Urban designer who lives in Hope. Also ran to be a councillor in the Richmond general ward.
Richard Osmaston		None	Previously ran for the mayoralties of Westland, Grey, Buller, Marlborough, Nelson, and Tasman in 2022. Also ran to be a councillor in the Lakes-Murchison general ward, and concurrently for the mayoralties of four other councils: Nelson, Buller, Grey and Westland.

=== Councillors ===
==== Te Tai o Aorere Māori ward ====
Te Tai o Aorere Māori ward returned one councillor to the district council.

Candidate	Photo	Affiliation	Notes
Paul Morgan		None	CNZM (2022; for services to Māori and business)

==== Richmond general ward ====
Richmond general ward returned four councillors to the district council.

Candidate	Photo	Affiliation	Notes
Glen Daikee		None	Incumbent councillor
Jo Ellis		None	Incumbent councillor
Mark Greening		Sensible, Affordable and Ethical	Incumbent councillor
Kit Maling		Independent	Incumbent councillor
Timo Neubauer		Independent	Also ran for mayor
Daniel Shirley		ACT Local	

==== Motueka general ward ====
Motueka general ward returned three councillors to the district council.

Candidate	Photo	Affiliation	Notes
Kerryn Ferneyhough		None	
Brent Maru		None	Incumbent councillor
David Ross		ACT Local	
Trindi Walker		None	Incumbent councillor

==== Moutere-Waimea general ward ====
Moutere-Waimea general ward returned three councillors to the district council.

Candidate	Photo	Affiliation	Notes
Julian Eggers		Independent	
Michael Kininmonth		None	Incumbent councillor
Dean McNamara		Sensible, Affordable and Ethical	Former two-term councillor who lost his seat in 2022
Dave Woods		None	

==== Golden Bay general ward ====
Golden Bay general ward returned two councillors to the district council.

Candidate	Photo	Affiliation	Notes
Rod Barker		None	
Celia Butler		None	Incumbent councillor
Axel Downard-Wilke		Independent	Transport planner, engineer and Wikipedian
Julian Hall		None	
Mark Hume		None	

==== Lakes-Murchison general ward ====
Lakes-Murchison general ward returned one councillor to the district council.

Candidate	Photo	Affiliation	Notes
Nicola Allan		None	
John Gully		None	
Richard Osmaston		None	Perennial candidate from the Money Free movement; also standing for mayor.

=== Community boards ===
Tasman District Council has two community boards: one covering Golden Bay and the other for the Motueka ward. Four community board members were elected per board.

Golden Bay Community Board
Candidate	Photo	Affiliation	Notes
Sunshine Appleby		Independent	
Clarissa Bruning		None	
Henry Dixon		Independent	Incumbent board member
Axel Downard-Wilke		Independent	Also ran to be a councillor for the Golden Bay general ward.
Grant Knowles		None	Incumbent board member
Mark Raffills		None	
Rodney Ward		Independent	Local businessman

Motueka Community Board
Candidate	Photo	Affiliation	Notes
Ray Hellyer		None	
Claire Hutt		None	Incumbent board member
John Katene		None	
Laura Lusk		None	
David Ogilvie		None	Has previously served in various roles between 1971 and 2022.

== Results ==
With the final results, the following candidates have been declared elected:

=== Summary ===
Ward	Previous	Elected
Mayor	Tim King	Tim King
Golden Bay	Celia Butler	Celia Butler
Golden Bay	Chris Hill^{R}	Mark Hume
Lakes / Murchison	Stuart Bryant^{R}	John Gully
Motueka	Barry Dowler^{R}	Kerryn Ferneyhough
Motueka	Brent Maru	Brent Maru
Motueka	Trindi Walker	Trindi Walker
Moutere / Waimea	Mike Kininmonth	Mike Kininmonth
Moutere / Waimea	Christine Mackenzie^{R}	Dean McNamara
Moutere / Waimea	Dan Shallcrass^{R}	Dave Woods
Richmond	Glen Daikee	Timo Neubauer
Richmond	Jo Ellis	Jo Ellis
Richmond	Mark Greening	Mark Greening
Richmond	Kit Maling	Kit Maling
Te Tai o Aorere Māori	New ward	Paul Morgan
^{R} – an incumbent who did not run for re-election

=== Mayor ===
Incumbent mayor Tim King was elected to a third term, with Timo Neubauer coming in second place.

2025 Tasman mayoral election
Party	Candidate	Votes	%	±%
Independent	Tim King^{†}	10,209	50.58	−7.95
Independent	Timo Neubauer	4,127	20.45	(new)
Independent	Richard Sherwood Johns	3,901	19.33	(new)
Independent	Maxwell Clark	1,220	6.04	−6.90
Independent	Richard Osmaston	357	1.77	+0.61
Informal votes		32	0.16	+0.06
Blank votes		337	1.67	−0.25
Turnout		20,183	47.75	−2.29
Registered electors		42,270		
Independent hold				
^{†} incumbent

=== Council ===
==== Te Tai o Aorere Māori ward ====
2025 Te Tai o Aorere Māori ward election
Party	Candidate	Votes	%	±%
Independent	Paul Te Poa Karoro Morgan	elected unopposed		
Registered electors		1,342		
Independent win (new seat)				

==== Richmond general ward ====
2025 Richmond general ward election
Party	Candidate	Votes	%	±%
Independent	Jo Ellis^{†}	3,554	55.45	+17.07
Independent	Kit Maling^{†}	3,452	53.86	−9.57
Independent	Timo Neubauer	3,413	53.25	(new)
Sensible, Affordable and Ethical	Mark Greening^{†}	3,064	47.81	+13.22
ACT Local	Daniel Shirley	3,052	47.62	(new)
Independent	Glen Daikee^{†}	2,991	46.67	+13.70
Informal votes		6	0.09	−0.06
Blank votes		107	1.67	−0.51
Turnout		6,409	46.41	−1.74
Registered electors		13,809		
Independent hold				
Independent hold				
Independent gain from Independent				
Sensible, Affordable and Ethical gain from Independent				
^{†} incumbent

==== Motueka general ward ====
2025 Motueka general ward election
Party	Candidate	Votes	%	±%
Independent	Brent Tahi Maru^{†}	3,011	72.47	+8.25
Independent	Trindi Walker^{†}	2,592	62.38	+17.54
Independent	Kerryn Jennifer Ferneyhough	2,271	54.66	(new)
ACT Local	Dave Ross	1,714	41.25	(new)
Informal votes		0	0.00	−0.30
Blank votes		45	1.08	+0.13
Turnout		4,155	46.69	−2.90
Registered electors		8,899		
Independent hold				
Independent hold				
Independent gain from Independent				
^{†} incumbent

==== Moutere-Waimea general ward ====
2025 Moutere-Waimea general ward election
Party	Candidate	Votes	%	±%
Independent	Dave Woods	3,177	57.89	(new)
Sensible, Affordable and Ethical	Dean McNamara	2,771	50.49	(new)
Independent	Mike Kininmonth^{†}	2,719	49.54	+7.59
Independent	Julian Alexander Eggers	2,708	49.34	(new)
Informal votes		7	0.13	+0.06
Blank votes		218	3.97	+1.31
Turnout		5,488	47.62	−3.28
Registered electors		11,525		
Independent gain from Independent				
Sensible, Affordable and Ethical gain from Independent				
Independent hold				
^{†} incumbent

==== Golden Bay general ward ====
2025 Golden Bay general ward election
Party	Candidate	Votes	%	±%
Independent	Mark Hume	1,110	45.36	(new)
Independent	Celia Butler^{†}	1,041	42.54	−26.23
Independent	Axel Downard-Wilke	898	36.70	(new)
Independent	Julian Hall	862	35.23	(new)
Independent	Rodney Taylor Barker	588	24.03	(new)
Informal votes		1	0.04	−0.04
Blank votes		16	0.65	−0.70
Turnout		2,447	58.55	+4.17
Registered electors		4,179		
Independent gain from Independent				
Independent hold				
^{†} incumbent

==== Lakes-Murchison general ward ====
2025 Lakes-Murchison general ward election
Party	Candidate	Votes	%	±%
Independent	John Gully	632	49.65	(new)
Independent	Nicola Shirley Allan	489	38.41	(new)
Independent	Richard Osmaston	111	8.72	+2.53
Informal votes		11	0.86	+0.72
Blank votes		30	2.36	+0.04
Turnout		1,273	50.60	+0.16
Registered electors		2,516		
Independent gain from Independent				

=== Māori ward referendum ===
Choice	Votes	%
I vote to keep the Māori ward	8,216	43.83
I vote to remove the Māori ward	10,529	56.17
Total	18,745	100.00
Valid votes	18,745	92.88
Invalid/blank votes	1,438	7.12
Total votes	20,183	100.00

== See also ==
- 2025 Nelson City Council election
