= Richard Harden (cricketer) =

English cricketer (born 1965)

Personal information
- Full name: Richard John Harden
- Born: 16 August 1965 (age 61); Bridgwater, Somerset, England
- Batting: Right-handed
- Bowling: Slow left-arm orthodox
- Role: Batsman
- Relatives: Rachel Reese (wife)

Domestic team information
- Years: Team
- 1985–1998: Somerset
- 1987/88–1990/91: Central Districts
- 1999–2000: Yorkshire
- FC debut: 8 May 1985 Somerset v Australians
- Last FC: 24 May 2000 Yorkshire v Zimbabwe
- LA debut: 14 May 1985 Somerset v Kent
- Last LA: 21 May 2000 Yorkshire v Gloucestershire

Career statistics
Competition	First-class	List A
Matches	253	283
Runs scored	13,336	7,007
Batting average	37.67	30.73
100s/50s	28/70	4/43
Top score	187	108*
Balls bowled	1,478	25
Wickets	20	0
Bowling average	51.15	–
5 wickets in innings	0	–
10 wickets in match	0	–
Best bowling	2/7	–
Catches/stumpings	189/–	86/–
- Source: ESPNcricinfo, 9 October 2009

Richard John Harden (born 16 August 1965) is a former English first-class cricketer. A right-handed batsman, he played for Somerset from 1985 to 1998, receiving his county cap in 1989, and for Yorkshire from 1999 to 2000. He also had two stints playing for Central Districts in New Zealand, and later moved to New Zealand permanently.

Harden runs a financial advice company. He is married to Rachel Reese, whose successful campaign for the mayoralty of Nelson he managed. They married in 2017 after 12 years together. They have three children from previous marriages: her son and daughter, and his son.
