= Rachel Reese =

New Zealand politician (born 1964/65)

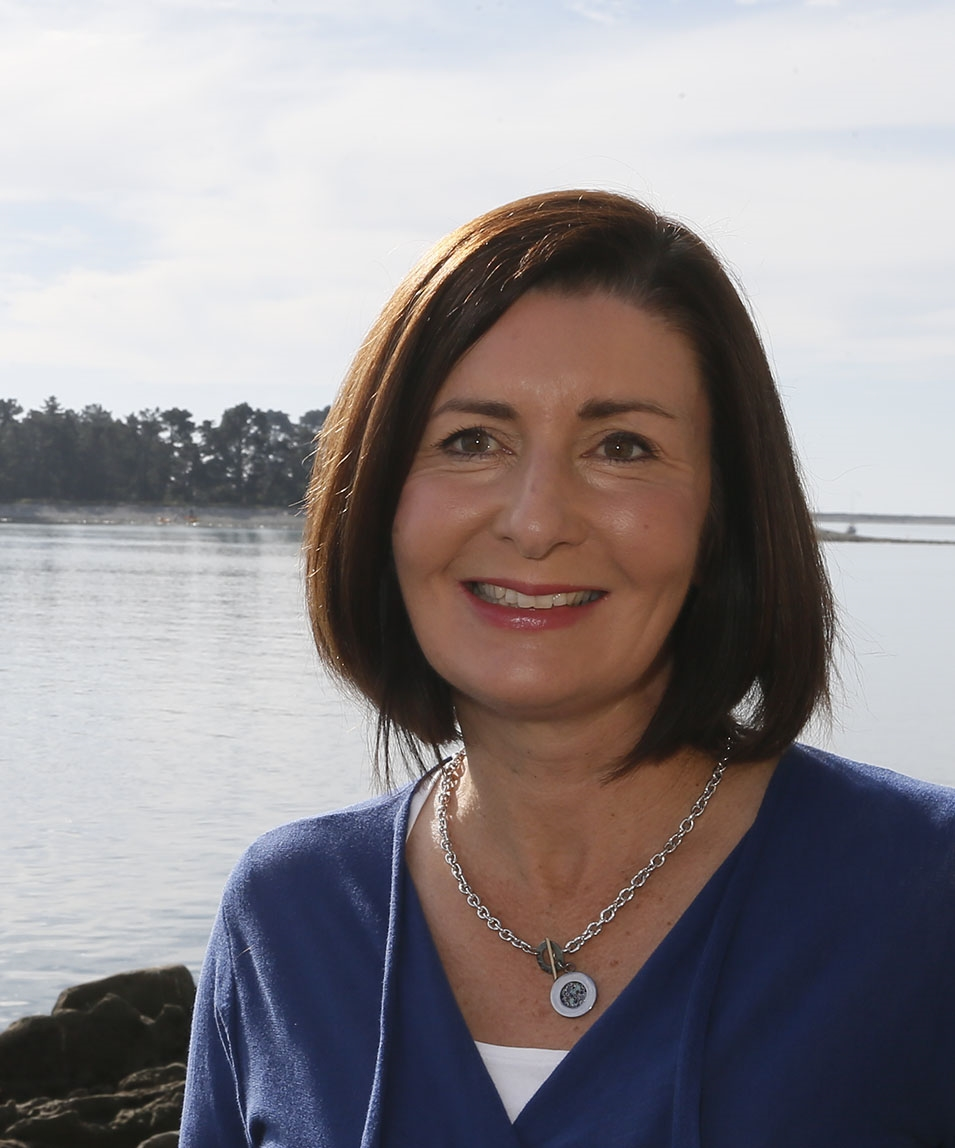
- Reese in 2016

29th Mayor of Nelson
- In office 2013–2022
- Preceded by: Aldo Miccio
- Succeeded by: Nick Smith

Personal details
- Born: Rachel Hadley Reese; 1964 or 1965 (age 61–62) Mosgiel, New Zealand
- Spouse: Richard Harden
- Children: 3
- Education: University of Otago

Rachel Hadley Reese (born 1964 or 1965) is a New Zealand former local-body politician. She was the mayor of Nelson from 2013 to 2022. She was Nelson's first female mayor.

== Early life and education ==
Reese was born in Mosgiel and grew up in Dunedin. She attended St Hilda's Collegiate School, leaving at aged 16 to enter the University of Otago from where she graduated with a commerce degree at age 19. She also has Graduate Diploma in Business Studies (Dispute Resolution) from Massey University and is a qualified Mediator and Arbitrator.

She has worked in Mount Isa and Melbourne in Australia, as well as in Auckland. She moved to Nelson in about 1997, her family having connections in the area, with her parents owning property on Arapaoa Island in the Marlborough Sounds.

Reese is an accredited Resource Management Commissioner (Chair) and a member of the Resource Management Law Association. She ran a Resource Management Consultancy in Nelson for 15 years prior to entering politics.

== Political career ==
Reese was first elected to the Nelson City Council in 2007. She was again elected in 2010 when she became deputy mayor, losing the mayoral race to Aldo Miccio with 4722 votes to his 6077. In 2013 she was elected mayor, beating Miccio by 7477 votes to 6048 in a 48.74% voter turnout.

Rachel Reese romped to victory again in the 2016 local body election securing over 60 per cent of the vote having received 11,364 of a total 18,707 votes. Her closest opponent, current councillor Peter Rainey received 5,050.

In 2016 Reese was elected onto the Local Government New Zealand national council and in June 2017 was nominated for the role of President following the announcement that current President, Lawrence Yule, was standing down. Reese is also Deputy of the Regional Sector and her Central Government appointments have included the Rules Reduction Taskforce, the Local Government RM Advisory Group and the Working Group on Representation, Governance and Accountability of new Water Services Entities.

In 2018 Reese was awarded the Paul Harris Fellowship by the Rotary Club of Nelson for her contribution as a community leader. November 2018 Mayor Reese hosted a celebration of current and former women elected members of Nelson City and Tasman District councils in honour of the 125th anniversary of women’s suffrage in New Zealand and to mark the publication of a booklet titled ‘Women Decision-Makers Nelson and Tasman’ documenting the experiences of 52 women on local government from 1944 to 2018.

October 2019 Reese won her third term as Mayor against a crowded field of contenders including former Nelson MP Mel Courtney and current councillors Bill Dahlberg and Tim Skinner. The 2019 election saw seven women elected onto Nelson City Council (including Reese) and six men - the first time that there had been a majority of women on the council. In another first, Reese appointed former three-term Tasman District Councillor Judene Edgar to be her deputy mayor, marking the first time that there had been a woman mayor and deputy mayor.

In 2019 she was the first New Zealander to be awarded a Vital Voices international fellowship, a programme supporting outstanding women political leaders. Founded by former US Secretaries of State Hillary Clinton and Madeleine Albright, Vital Voices is part of a United States-based programme to increase the capacity, decision-making power and effectiveness of women leaders in public life.

In 2022 she announced that she would not be contesting the mayoralty at the upcoming elections.

== Personal life ==
Reese married her long-time partner, English-born former cricketer Richard Harden, in January 2017. They have three children between them.

Political offices
Preceded by Aldo Miccio	Mayor of Nelson; 2013–2022	Succeeded by Nick Smith
