= Tasman District Council =

Local council in New Zealand

Coordinates: 41.34165°S 173.18696°E

Tasman District Council Te Kaunihera o te tai o Aorere
- Brand logo

Type
- Type: Territorial authority of Tasman District
- Term limits: None

History
- Established: Initial constitution; 1 April 1989; 37 years ago; Reconstitution; 1 November 1989; 36 years ago
- Preceded by: Richmond Borough Council; Motueka Borough Council; Golden Bay County Council; Waimea County Council
- New session started: 18 October 2025

Leadership
- Mayor: Tim King, Ind. since 18 October 2019
- Deputy: Brent Maru, Ind. since 30 October 2025
- CEO: Leonie Rae since 19 February 2024

Structure
- Seats: 15 (including mayor)
- Political groups: Independent (13); SAE (2)
- Length of term: 3 years

Elections
- Voting system: First-past-the-post
- First election: 29 March & 14 October 1989
- Last election: 11 October 2025
- Next election: 14 October 2028

Meeting place
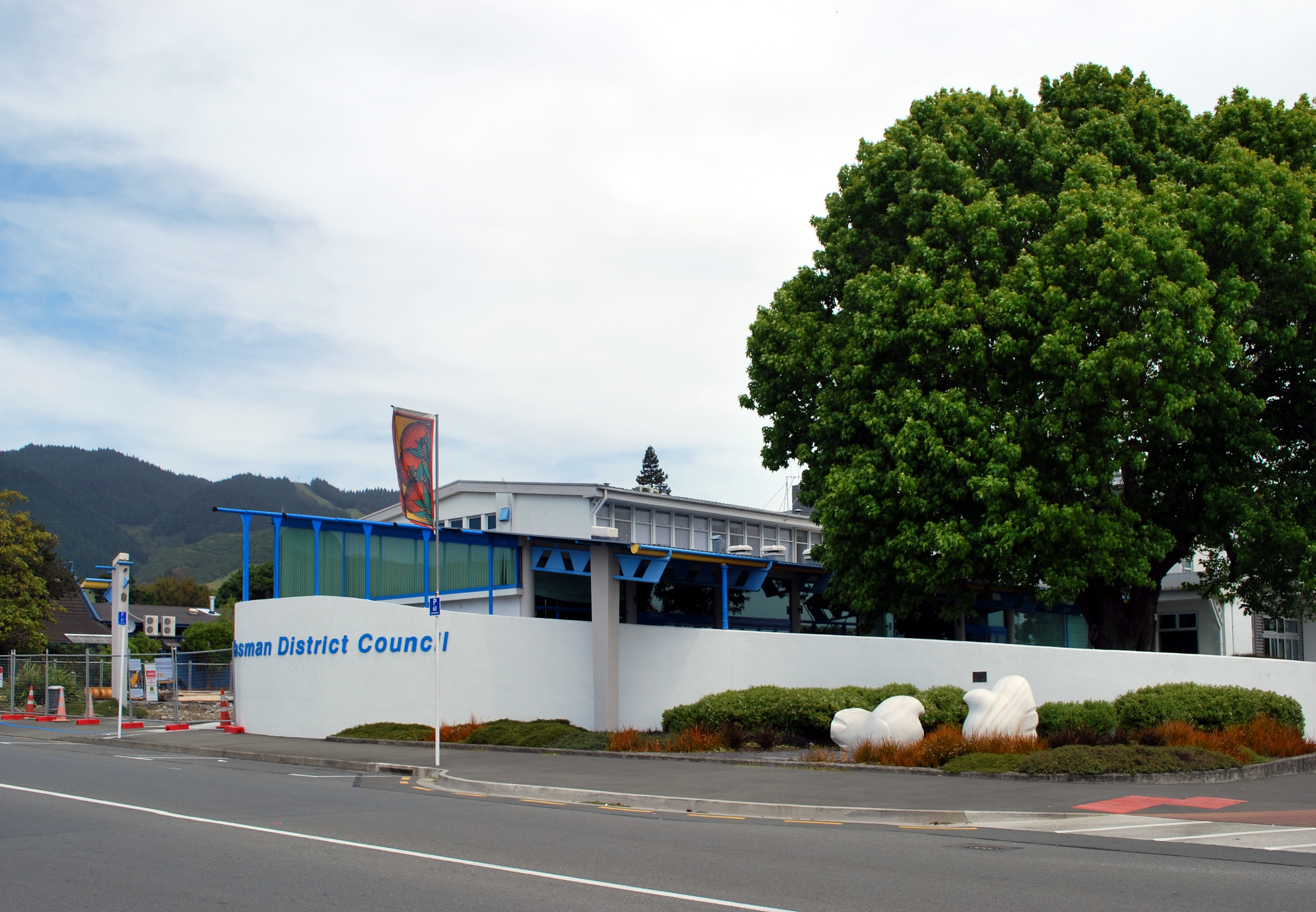
- 189 Queen Street, Richmond

Website
- tasman.govt.nz

Tasman District Council (abbr. TDC; Māori: Te Kaunihera o te tai o Aorere) is the territorial authority for the Tasman District of New Zealand. It serves as the district's local and regional government as a unitary authority. It was initially constituted in April 1989; in November 1989 it was reconstituted anew alongside all local authorities in New Zealand as part of major reforms to local government and gaining the Golden Bay area in that process. Prior to the district council, local government in the area was split between four authorities.

The governing body of the council has 14 councillors and is chaired by the mayor of Tasman (currently Tim King since October 2019).

== History ==
=== Predecessors ===
Tasman District Council was formed on 1 April 1989, replacing Richmond Borough Council, Motueka Borough Council, and Waimea County Council. Golden Bay County Council joined Tasman District on 1 November 1989.

=== Disestablishment of Nelson-Marlborough Regional Council ===
The council was initially one of four authorities (Note: The other three being Nelson City Council, Marlborough District Council and Kaikoura District Council.) in the Nelson-Marlborough Region, until the Nelson-Marlborough Regional Council was disestablished on 1 July 1992; regional responsibilities were transferred to the council making it a unitary authority.

== Governing body ==
=== Mayor ===
One mayor is elected at-large; they chair meetings of the governing body and act as the head of local government in the district.

=== Current composition ===
The current members of the governing body of council are:

Role	Portrait	Name	Affiliation	Ward
Mayor		Tim King	Independent	Elected at-large
Deputy		Brent Maru	Independent	Motueka
Councillor		Trindi Walker	Independent	Motueka
Councillor		Kerryn Ferneyhough	Independent	Motueka
Councillor		Paul Morgan	Independent	Te Tai o Aorere Māori
Councillor		John Gully	Independent	Lakes / Murchison
Councillor		Mark Hume	Independent	Golden Bay
Councillor		Celia Butler	Independent	Golden Bay
Councillor		Dave Woods	Independent	Moutere / Waimea
Councillor		Dean McNamara	Sensible, Affordable and Ethical	Moutere / Waimea
Councillor		Mike Kininmonth	Independent	Moutere / Waimea
Councillor		Jo Ellis	Independent	Richmond
Councillor		Kit Maling	Independent	Richmond
Councillor		Timo Neubauer	Independent	Richmond
Councillor		Mark Greening	Sensible, Affordable and Ethical	Richmond

== Committees ==
Council members meet each month as a full council. There are six council committees: Regulatory, Strategy and Policy, Operations, Audit and Risk, CEO Review and Commercial.

Tasman District Council has representatives on several joint committees with Nelson City Council: Community Development, Engineering Services, Environmental Planning, Tasman Regional Transport, Joint Shareholders Committee, the Nelson Regional Sewerage Business Unit, the Regional Pest Management Joint Committee, and the Saxton Field Committee. The two councils also have a joint District Licensing Committee, which deals with all alcohol licensing matters.

== Community boards ==
The council currently has two community boards, representing the communities of Golden Bay and Motueka.

== Elections ==
The initial elections were held on 29 March 1989 for a mayor and fourteen councillors from five wards: Lakes, Richmond, Waimea, Moutere, and Motueka. Those members were elected until October 1992. The two Golden Bay councillors were elected on 14 October 1989. At that time, the council's two community boards—Golden Bay and Motueka, with six members each plus the ward councillors—were also elected.

=== List ===
==== Council ====
- 1989
- 1992
- 1995
- 1998
- 2001
- 2004
- 2007
- 2010
- 2013
- 2016
- 2019
- 2022
- 2025

==== Mayoral ====
- 1989
- 1992
- 1995
- 1998
- 2001
- 2004
- 2007
- 2010
- 2013
- 2016
- 2019
- 2022
- 2025

== Wards ==
Tasman elects its 13 councillors from five wards: three from Motueka, three from Moutere/Waimea, four from Richmond, one from Murchison and two from Golden Bay. Golden Bay and Motueka wards also have community boards, each with four elected members, who work with the council to support their local community.

== Offices ==
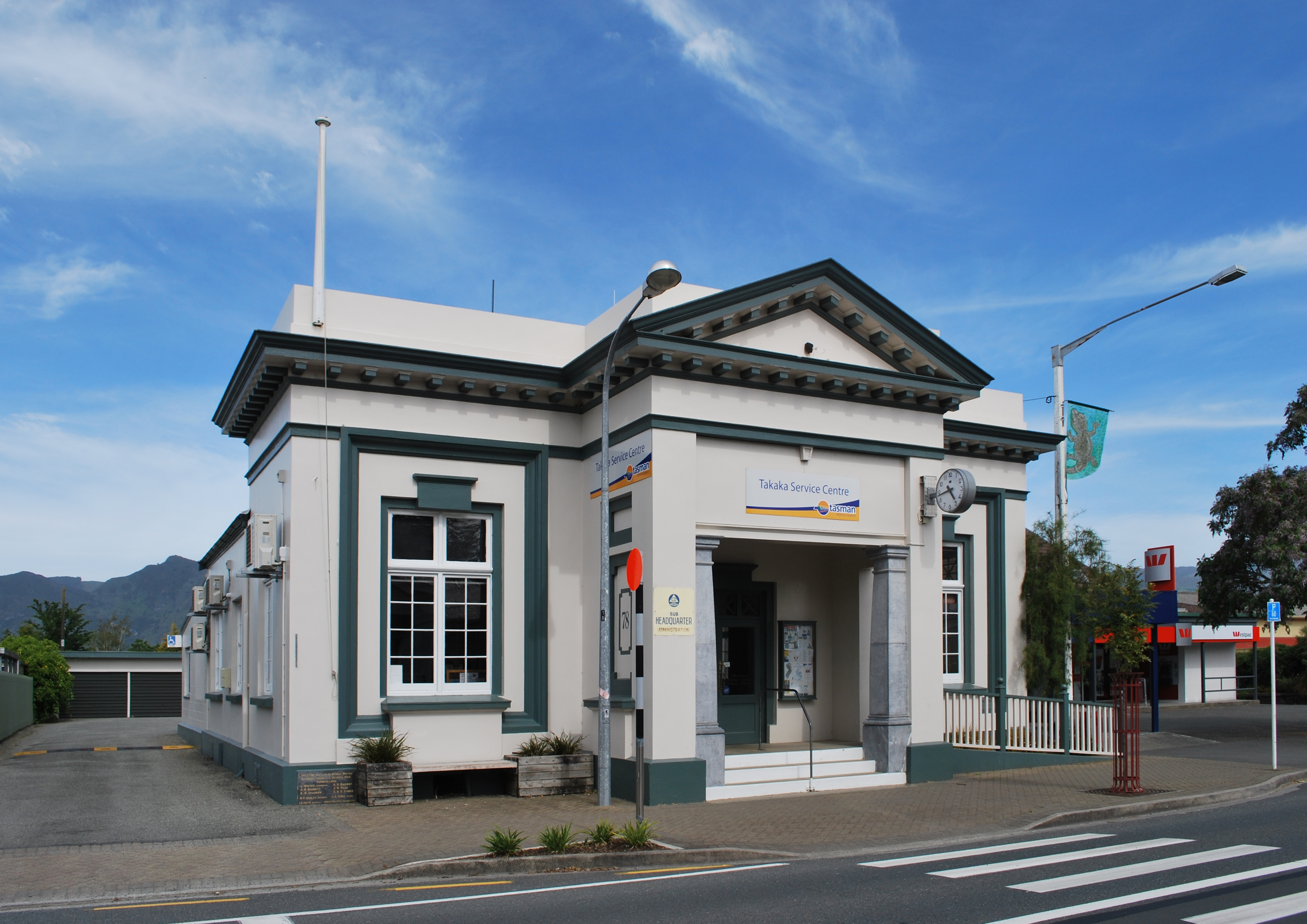
Tākaka service centre

The council chamber is in Richmond and there are service centres at Motueka, Murchison, Richmond and Tākaka.
