= Money Free movement =

Political movement in NZ and UK

The Money Free movement is a political movement that advocates for a resource-based economy, where all work is voluntary. The movement has political parties in New Zealand and the United Kingdom and is aligned with work of the American-based Jacque Fresco, who is the founder of The Venus Project.

The movement has fielded candidates in several elections across at least two countries, but has not won any positions.

== Political activities in New Zealand ==
Money Free Party NZ
- Leader: Richard Osmaston
- Founded: 2014

Website
- moneyfreeparty.org.nz/

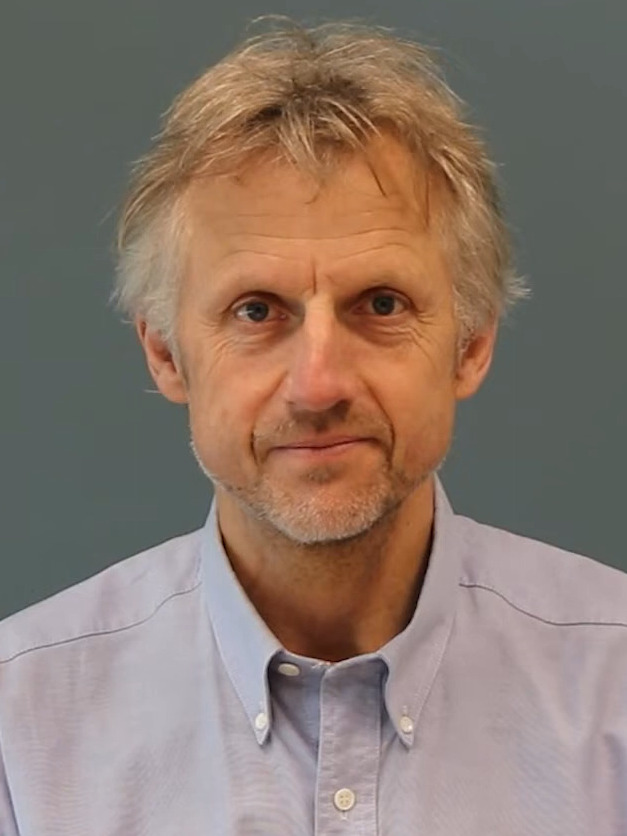
Osmaston in 2022

As of 2023, Money Free Party NZ is led by Richard Osmaston, who founded the party. Osmaston previously ran for mayor of Nelson in 2013 before founding the party in 2014.

=== Elections ===
The party was unable to get enough verified members (500) to register for the 2014 general election. It stood five electorate candidates, but none were successful.

Party members stood for multiple mayoralties in the 2016 local elections, such as Richard Osmaston in Nelson, Gordon Marshall in Porirua, and Ted Howard in Kaikōura. Osmaston also stood for the Moutere / Waimea seat in Tasman District Council in the same year.

In the 2017 general election the party stood four candidates in electorates, winning 293 votes. The party's best result was from Scott Andrew in Palmerston North, who received 142 votes (0.41%, 5th of 5 candidates).

Osmaston stood for mayor of Grey District in 2019, receiving 302 votes compared to the winner's 2,709.

The party ran two candidates in the 2020 New Zealand general election: Richard Osmaston in West Coast-Tasman, and Prince Bhavik in Kaikōura. Neither was successful. During the 2022 local elections, Osmaston ran for six different mayoralties, winning none. Osmaston also stood as a candidate in the 2022 Hamilton West by-election, but was again unsuccessful. The party fielded two candidates in the 2023 general election.

In the 2025 local elections, Osmaston again ran for the mayoralties of Buller, Grey, Nelson and Westland as a Money Free candidate (as well as for mayor and councillor in the Tasman District under no affiliation), while Shaun Brown ran as the party's candidate for the mayoralty of Marlborough. Brown admitted that his run was more about raising awareness of the party than a serious attempt to become mayor.

In the 2026 general election, the party stood three electorate candidates: Osmaston ran again in West Coast-Tasman, Luke Beharrell in Whangārei, and Liam Anderson in Wellington Bays. None of the candidates were successful. Based on preliminary results, Osmaston received 45 votes in West Coast-Tasman, coming 10th out of 11 candidates.

== Political activities in the United Kingdom ==
Money Free Party-UK (MFP-UK) was a registered political party in the UK. It is led by Jodian Rodgers.

It was a registered party in Great Britain from September 2013 until November 2016, when it was statutorily deregistered. In March 2017 the UK Electoral Commission approved its re-registration. It was again deregistered in 2021.

In a 2017 interview, Rodgers advocated putting all resources into common ownership, automating as much labour as possible, and having no leaders.

=== Elections ===
Nick Tapping ran in the 2015 Poole Borough Council election, coming last in the Canford Heath West ward. The Money Free Party was also a registered party for the 2015 general elections.

Jodiah Rodgers contested the Bristol West seat in the 2017 elections. Rodgers came last of five candidates with 101 votes, losing his deposit with just 0.1% of the vote.

== Political activities in the United States ==
An American named Steve Saylor announced on a podcast that he planned to campaign for U.S. president in 2020 as part of the Money Free Party, but never filed as a candidate in any state.

== See also ==
- Egalitarianism
- Free Money Day
- Freedom of association
- Non-monetary economy
- Open-access
- Post-scarcity economy
- Progressive Utilization Theory
  - Progressive Party of Aotearoa New Zealand
- Refusal of work
- Subsistence economy
- Technological fix
- The Venus Project
- The Zeitgeist Movement
- Universal basic income
- Voluntaryism
