= Results of the 2025 New Zealand territorial authority elections =

2025 New Zealand territorial authority elections
- 11 October 2025
- 66 of 67 local councils
Party	Councils	+/–
No majority	66	0
This lists parties that won seats. See the complete results below.
- 66 mayors and 709 local councillors
Party	Seats	+/–
Mayors
Independent	63	+2
Fix Auckland	1	+1
Labour	1	0
Green	1	0
Local councillors
Independent	641	−7
Labour	17	+2
Green	10	+1
ACT Local	6	+6
People's Choice	6	+1
Better Hamilton	4	+4
Te Pāti Māori	3	0
Fix Auckland	2	+2
Other local groups (Note: Includes groups not listed above; groups listed above include nation-wide groups, groups that elected a mayor, or groups with at least 3 councillors.)	20	−7
This lists parties that won seats. See the complete results below.

Elections for the territorial authorities of New Zealand were held from 9 September until 11 October 2025 as part of that year's nation-wide local elections. 711 local councillors and 66 mayors were elected across 66 of 67 councils. Elections weren't held in Tauranga as the city had already held elections the previous year.

== Maps ==

Legend
Independent hold	Independent gain
PC / Labour hold	PC / Labour gain
Green hold	Green gain
	ACT Local gain
	Better Hamilton gain
	Te Pāti Māori gain
	Fix Auckland gain
Other local group hold	Other local group gain

== Summary ==
=== Overall ===
Council	Electoral system	Seats	Mayor	Councillors	Control	Turnout	Details	Refs
Far North	STV	10	▌ Independent hold	▌ Independent 8 (▼2) ▌ YVOC 1 (▲1) ▌ ACT Local 1 (▲1)	▌ No majority	24,556; 50.68% ▲9.15 pp	Details	
Whangārei	STV	13	▌ Independent gain	▌ Independent 12 ( 0) ▌ ACT Local 1 (▲1)	▌ No majority	30,490; 45.50% ▲2.23 pp	Details	
Kaipara	FPP	8	▌ Independent gain	▌ Independent 8 ( 0)	▌ No majority	10,702; 58.39% ▲10.83 pp	Details	
Auckland	FPP	20	▌ Fix Auckland gain	▌ Independent 6 (▼3) ▌ Labour 5 ( 0) ▌ Fix Auckland 2 (▲2) ▌ MPAT 2 (▲1) ▌ City Vision 1 ( 0) ▌ PPF 1 (▼1) ▌ C&R 1 ( 0) ▌ WestWards 1 ( 0) ▌ Team Franklin 1 ( 0)	▌ No majority	350,153; 29.04% ▼6.37 pp	Details	
Thames-Coromandel	FPP	10	▌ Independent gain	▌ Independent 10 (▲1)	▌ No majority	12,272; 48.11% ▼3.34 pp	Details	
Hauraki	FPP	13	▌ Independent hold	▌ Independent 13 ( 0)	▌ No majority	6,120; 40.24% ▼0.32 pp	Details	
Waikato	FPP	13	▌ Independent gain	▌ Independent 13 ( 0)	▌ No majority	20,360; 35.03% ▲2.72 pp	Details	
Matamata-Piako	FPP	12	▌ Independent gain	▌ Independent 12 ( 0)	▌ No majority	11,570; 45.85% ▲4.44 pp	Details	
Hamilton	STV	14	▌ Independent gain	▌ Independent 10 (▼2) ▌ Better Hamilton 4 (▲4)	▌ No majority	38,063; 32.97% ▲3.81 pp	Details	
Waipā	FPP	11	▌ Independent gain	▌ Independent 10 (▼1) ▌ Better Waipa 1 (▲1)	▌ No majority	17,411; 42.27% ▼1.89 pp	Details	
Ōtorohanga	FPP	9	▌ Independent gain	▌ Independent 9 ( 0)	▌ No majority	3,168; 49.90% ▲4.74 pp	Details	
South Waikato	FPP	10	▌ Independent hold	▌ Independent 10 ( 0)	▌ No majority	7,596; 46.05% ▲2.89 pp	Details	
Waitomo	FPP	6	▌ Independent hold	▌ Independent 6 ( 0)	▌ No majority	2,761; 46.15% ▲2.13 pp	Details	
Taupō	FPP	12	▌ Independent gain	▌ Independent 11 (▼1) ▌ Let's Go Taupō 1 (▲1)	▌ No majority	15,866; 56.13% ▲8.86 pp	Details	
Western Bay of Plenty	FPP	9	▌ Independent hold	▌ Independent 9 ( 0)	▌ No majority	15,299; 38.20% ▲0.55 pp	Details	
Rotorua	FPP	10	▌ Independent hold	▌ Independent 9 ( 0) ▌ Te Pāti Māori 1 (▲1)	▌ No majority	21,795; 43.52% ▼4.41 pp	Details	
Whakatāne	FPP	10	▌ Independent Green gain	▌ Independent 10 ( 0)	▌ No majority	12,824; 49.20% ▲3.95 pp	Details	
Kawerau	FPP	8	▌ Independent hold	▌ Independent 8 ( 0)	▌ No majority	2,345; 45.31% ▲3.16 pp	Details	
Kawerau	FPP	7	▌ Independent hold	▌ Independent 7 ( 0)	▌ No majority	3,063; 46.81% ▼7.09 pp	Details	
Gisborne	STV	13	▌ Independent hold	▌ Independent 13 ( 0)	▌ No majority	16,377; 48.07% ▲4.66 pp	Details	
Wairoa	FPP	6	▌ Independent hold	▌ Independent 6 ( 0)	▌ No majority	3,192; 56.05% ▲4.57 pp	Details	
Hastings	FPP	15	▌ Independent gain	▌ Independent 13 (▼1) ▌ Independent Green 1 (▲1) ▌ CARE for Hastings 1 (▲1)	▌ No majority	26,759; 45.84% ▲12.12 pp	Details	
Napier	FPP	11	▌ Independent gain	▌ Independent 11 (▲1)	▌ No majority	21,325; 46.08% ▲5.94 pp	Details	
Central Hawke's Bay	FPP	9	▌ Independent gain	▌ Independent 9 ( 0)	▌ No majority	6,134; 56.39% ▲12.08 pp	Details	
New Plymouth	STV	14	▌ Independent gain	▌ Independent 13 (▼1) ▌ ACT Local 1 (▲1)	▌ No majority	28,625; 46.46% ▲1.44 pp	Details	
Stratford	FPP	11	▌ Independent hold	▌ Independent 11 ( 0)	▌ No majority	3,684; 53.74% ▲10.75 pp	Details	
South Taranaki	FPP	13	▌ Independent gain	▌ Independent 13 (▲1)	▌ No majority	8,438; 45.13% ▲5.80 pp	Details	
Ruapehu	STV	9	▌ Independent hold	▌ Independent 9 ( 0)	▌ No majority	4,302; 51.56% ▲0.67 pp	Details	
Whanganui	FPP	12	▌ Independent hold	▌ Independent 12 ( 0)	▌ No majority	17,024; 50.81% ▲3.34 pp	Details	
Rangitīkei	FPP	11	▌ Independent hold	▌ Independent 11 ( 0)	▌ No majority	5,451; 49.85% ▲3.07 pp	Details	
Manawatū	FPP	11	▌ Independent gain	▌ Independent 8 (▼2) ▌ Independent Green 1 (▲1) ▌ ACT Local 1 (▲1) ▌ Te Kōtui Reo 1 (▲1)	▌ No majority	9,171; 40.29% ▼4.72 pp	Details	
Palmerston North	STV	15	▌ Independent hold	▌ Independent 11 (▲1) ▌ Green 2 ( 0) ▌ Labour 1 ( 0) ▌ Te Pāti Māori 1 (▲1)	▌ No majority	25,060; 42.13% ▲5.40 pp	Details	
Tararua	FPP	9	▌ Independent gain	▌ Independent 9 ( 0)	▌ No majority	7,119; 55.47% ▲6.25 pp	Details	
Horowhenua	FPP	12	▌ Independent hold	▌ Independent 12 ( 0)	▌ No majority	12,214; 47.44% ▲1.30 pp	Details	
Kāpiti Coast	STV	10	▌ Independent hold	▌ Independent 9 (▼1) ▌ Te Pāti Māori 1 (▲1)	▌ No majority	20,481; 46.91% ▲1.14 pp	Details	
Porirua	STV	10	▌ Independent hold	▌ Independent 8 ( 0) ▌ Labour 2 ( 0)	▌ No majority	17,623; 40.95% ▲3.61 pp	Details	
Upper Hutt	FPP	10	▌ Independent gain	▌ Independent 10 ( 0)	▌ No majority	16,728; 50.54% ▲6.59 pp	Details	
Lower Hutt	FPP	13	▌ Independent gain	▌ Independent 11 (▲3)	▌ No majority	33,037; 41.81% ▲0.81 pp	Details	
Wellington	STV	15	▌ Labour gain	▌ Independent 5 (▼3) ▌ Labour 5 (▲1) ▌ Green 4 (▲1) ▌ Independent Together 1 (▲1)	▌ No majority	81,574; 50.57% ▲5.03 pp	Details	
Masterton	FPP	8	▌ Independent gain	▌ Independent 8 ( 0)	▌ No majority	9,564; 47.56% ▼0.20 pp	Details	
Carterton	FPP	8	▌ Independent gain	▌ Independent 8 ( 0)	▌ No majority	4,159; 53.89% ▼6.78 pp	Details	
South Wairarapa	FPP	10	▌ Independent gain	▌ Independent 10 (▲1)	▌ No majority	5,597; 59.89% ▲4.43 pp	Details	
Tasman	FPP	14	▌ Independent hold	▌ Independent 12 (▼1) ▌ SAE 2 (▲2)	▌ No majority	20,183; 47.75% ▼2.29 pp	Details	
Nelson	STV	12	▌ Independent hold	▌ Independent 11 (▲2) ▌ Labour 1 (▲1)	▌ No majority	18,789; 48.59% ▼4.62 pp	Details	
Marlborough	STV	14	▌ Independent hold	▌ Independent 12 (▼2) ▌ ACT Local 2 (▲2)	▌ No majority	15,333; 44.05% ▼0.08 pp	Details	
Buller	FPP	10	▌ Independent gain	▌ Independent 10 ( 0)	▌ No majority	4,199; 55.05% ▲5.82 pp	Details	
Grey	FPP	8	▌ Independent hold	▌ Independent 8 ( 0)	▌ No majority	4,683; 47.37% ▼1.97 pp	Details	
Westland	FPP	8	▌ Independent hold	▌ Independent 8 ( 0)	▌ No majority	3,677; 56.87% ▼3.55 pp	Details	
Kaikōura	FPP	7	▌ Independent hold	▌ Independent 7 ( 0)	▌ No majority	1,881; 61.43% ▼2.87 pp	Details	
Hurunui	FPP	10	▌ Independent hold	▌ Independent 10 ( 0)	▌ No majority	3,337; 34.45% ▼14.96 pp	Details	
Waimakariri	FPP	10	▌ Independent hold	▌ Independent 9 (▼1) ▌ Standing Together 1 (▲1)	▌ No majority	9,540; 48.39% ▼0.06 pp	Details	
Christchurch	FPP	16	▌ Independent hold	▌ Independent 7 (▼1) ▌ PC / Labour 7 (▲1) (Note: ▌ People's Choice 4 (▲1) ▌ People's Choice / Labour 2 ( 0) ▌ Labour 1 ( 0)) ▌ Independent Citizens 2 ( 0)	▌ No majority	107,475; 38.30% ▼6.06 pp	Details	
Selwyn	FPP	10	▌ Independent gain	▌ Independent 10 ( 0)	▌ No majority	26,440; 48.32% ▲5.18 pp	Details	
Ashburton	FPP	9	▌ Independent gain	▌ Independent 9 ( 0)	▌ No majority	10,658; 46.39% ▼4.72 pp	Details	
Timaru	FPP	9	▌ Independent hold	▌ Independent 9 ( 0)	▌ No majority	16,259; 48.39% ▼1.21 pp	Details	
Mackenzie	FPP	7	▌ Independent gain	▌ Independent 7 ( 0)	▌ No majority	2,130; 61.35% ▲5.46 pp	Details	
Waimate	FPP	8	▌ Independent hold	▌ Independent 8 ( 0)	▌ No majority	2,954; 53.52% ▼0.87 pp	Details	
Waitaki	FPP	10	▌ Independent gain	▌ Independent 10 ( 0)	▌ No majority	28,593; 52.52% ▲2.35 pp	Details	
Central Otago	FPP	10	▌ Independent hold	▌ Independent 10 (▼1)	▌ No majority	9,939; 55.47% ▲7.35 pp	Details	
Queenstown Lakes	FPP	11	▌ Independent gain	▌ Independent 11 ( 0)	▌ No majority	12,927; 41.54% ▼2.93 pp	Details	
Dunedin	STV	14	▌ Independent gain	▌ Independent 10 ( 0) ▌ Future Dunedin 1 (▲1) ▌ Building Kotahitaka 1 (▲1) ▌ Labour 1 (▲1) ▌ Green 1 (▲1)	▌ No majority	43,300; 45.72% ▼4.18 pp	Details	
Clutha	FPP	9	▌ Independent gain	▌ Independent 9 (▼3)	▌ No majority	6,614; 53.45% ▲0.35 pp	Details	
Southland	FPP	12	▌ Independent hold	▌ Independent 12 ( 0)	▌ No majority	8,744; 42.36% ▼5.79 pp	Details	
Gore	FPP	11	▌ Independent gain	▌ Independent 11 (▲2)	▌ No majority	4,991; 55.16% ▲1.79 pp	Details	
Invercargill	FPP	12	▌ Independent gain	▌ Independent 12 (▲4)	▌ No majority	17,996; 46.35% ▼6.84 pp	Details	
Chatham Islands	FPP	8	▌ Independent gain	▌ Independent 8 ( 0)	▌ No majority	316; 71.18% ▲17.95 pp	Details	
66 of 67 councils		709						

=== Candidates ===
Party / ticket	Mayors				Councillors			
Party / ticket	2022	Candidates	Elected	+/−	2022	Candidates	Elected	+/−
Independent	61	261	63	▲2	648	1,415	641	▼7
Labour (Note: Excludes joints The People's Choice and Labour candidates)	1	1	1	0	15	20	17	▲2
Green (Note: Includes Green-endorsed independents. Does not include Green-endorsed candidates of other tickets.)	1	2	1	0	9	22	10	▲2
People's Choice (Note: Includes joint The People's Choice and Labour candidates)	no candidates				5	8	6	▲1
ACT Local	no candidates				(new)	34	6	▲6
Better Hamilton	(new)	1	0	0	(new)	9	4	▲4
Te Pāti Māori	no candidates				3	3	3	0
Fix Auckland	(new)	1	1	▲1	(new)	5	2	▲2
Sensible, Affordable and Ethical	no candidates				(new)	2	2	▲2
MPAT	no candidates				1	2	2	▲1
Independent Citizens	no candidates				2	3	2	0
Te Kōtui Reo	no candidates				0	1	1	▲1
CARE for Hastings	no candidates				(new)	2	1	▲1
Let's Go Taupō	no candidates				(new)	3	1	▲1
Building Kotahitaka	(new)	1	0	0	(new)	3	1	▲1
YVOC	(new)	1	0	0	(new)	3	1	▲1
Better Waipa	no candidates				(new)	6	1	▲1
Independent Together	(new)	1	0	0	(new)	6	1	▲1
Standing Together	(new)	1	0	0	(new)	6	1	▲1
Future Dunedin	(new)	1	0	0	(new)	9	1	▲1
Team Franklin	no candidates				1	1	1	0
City Vision	no candidates				1	3	1	0
WestWards	no candidates				1	3	1	0
PPF	no candidates				2	2	1	▼1
C&R	no candidates				2	4	1	▼1
Silly Hat	(new)	2	0	0	no candidates			
Money Free Party	0	5	0	0	no candidates			
Alliance	no candidates				0	1	0	0
Future West	no candidates				0	1	0	0
Te Rūnanga o Ngāti Ruanui Trust	no candidates				0	1	0	0
Radical Action	(new)	1	0	0	(new)	1	0	0
Sovereign NZ	0	1	0	0	0	1	0	0
Animal Justice	0	2	0	0	0	1	0	0
Change for Central	no candidates				(new)	2	0	0
Love Manurewa-Papakura	no candidates				0	2	0	0
Constitution	0	1	0	0	0	2	0	0
We Love Kāpiti	(new)	1	0	0	(new)	6	0	0
Citizens	no candidates				1	0	0	▼1
RDRR	no candidates				1	0	0	▼1
Residents and Ratepayers	no candidates				1	0	0	▼1
Team Integrity	no candidates				1	0	0	▼1
Rangitāne o Manawatū	no candidates				2	0	0	▼2
Working Together	no candidates				2	0	0	▼2
Team Hokonui	1	0	0	▼1	2	0	0	▼2
Team Dunedin	1	0	0	▼1	3	0	0	▼3
LETS GO Invercargill	1	0	0	▼1	4	0	0	▼4
Total:	66	284	66	0	707	1,593	709	▲2

=== Mayors ===
Council	Incumbent	Elected	Runner-up	Details	Refs
Far North	Moko Tepania (Ind)		Ann Court (YVOC)	Details	
Whangārei	Vince Cocurullo (Ind)	Ken Couper (Ind)	Vince Cocurullo (Ind)	Details	
Kaipara	Craig Jepson^{R} (Ind)	Jonathan Larsen (Ind)	Snow Tane (Ind)	Details	
Auckland	Wayne Brown (Fix Auckland)		Kerrin Leoni (Ind)	Details	
Thames-Coromandel	Len Salt (Ind)	Peter Revell (Ind)	Patrick Kerr (Ind)	Details	
Hauraki	Toby Adams (Ind)		Roman Jackson (Ind)	Details	
Waikato	Jacqui Church (Ind)	Aksel Bech (Ind)	Jacqui Church (Ind)	Details	
Matamata-Piako	Adrienne Wilcock (Ind)	Ash Tanner (Ind)	Adrienne Wilcock (Ind)	Details	
Hamilton	Paula Southgate^{R} (Ind)	Tim Macindoe (Ind)	Sarah Thomson (Ind)	Details	
Waipā	Susan O'Regan (Ind)	Mike Pettit (Ind)	Susan O'Regan (Ind)	Details	
Ōtorohanga	Max Baxter^{R} (Ind)	Rodney Dow (Ind)	Cathy Prendergast (Ind)	Details	
South Waikato	Gary Petley (Ind)		Zed Latinovic (Ind)	Details	
Waitomo	John Robertson (Ind)		Janette Osborne (Ind)	Details	
Taupō	David Trewavas (Ind)	John Funnell (Ind)	Zane Cozens (Ind)	Details	
Western Bay of Plenty	James Denyer (Ind)		Margaret Murray-Benge (Ind)	Details	
Rotorua	Tania Tapsell (Ind)		Don Paterson (Ind)	Details	
Whakatāne	Victor Luca (Ind)	Nándor Tánczos (Ind Green)	Victor Luca (Ind)	Details	
Kawerau	Faylene Tunui (Ind)		Carolyn Ion (Ind)	Details	
Ōpōtiki	David Moore (Ind)		Curley Keno (Ind)	Details	
Gisborne	Rehette Stolz (Ind)		Colin Alder (Ind)	Details	
Wairoa	Craig Little (Ind)		Denise Eaglesome-Karekare (Ind)	Details	
Hastings	Sandra Hazlehurst^{R} (Ind)	Wendy Schollum (Ind)	Marcus Buddo (Ind)	Details	
Napier	Kirsten Wise (Ind)	Richard McGrath (Ind)	Kirsten Wise (Ind)	Details	
Central Hawke's Bay	Alex Walker (Ind)	Will Foley (Ind)	Alex Walker (Ind)	Details	
New Plymouth	Neil Holdom^{R} (Ind)	Max Brough (Ind)	David Bublitz (Ind)	Details	
Stratford	Neil Volzke (Ind)		Jono Erwood (Ind)	Details	
South Taranaki	Phil Nixon (Ind)		Clem Coxhead (Ind)	Details	
Ruapehu	Weston Kirton (Ind)		Grant Lethborg (Ind)	Details	
Whanganui	Andrew Tripe (Ind)		Josh Chandulal-Mackay (Ind)	Details	
Rangitīkei	Andy Watson (Ind)		Simon Loudon (Ind)	Details	
Manawatū	Helen Worboys^{R} (Ind)	Michael Ford (Ind)	unopposed	Details	
Palmerston North	Grant Smith (Ind)		Orphée Mickalad (Ind)	Details	
Tararua	Tracey Collis (Ind)	Scott Gilmore (Ind)	Tracey Collis (Ind)	Details	
Horowhenua	Bernie Wanden (Ind)		Justin Tamihana (Ind)	Details	
Kāpiti Coast	Janet Holborow (Ind)		Rob McCann (Ind)	Details	
Porirua	Anita Baker (Ind)		Kathleen Filo (Ind)	Details	
Upper Hutt	Wayne Guppy (Ind)	Peri Zee (Ind)	Wayne Guppy (Ind)	Details	
Lower Hutt	Campbell Barry^{R} (Labour)	Ken Laban (Ind)	Brady Dyer (Ind)	Details	
Wellington	Tory Whanau^{R} (Ind Green)	Andrew Little (Labour)	Karl Tiefenbacher (Ind)	Details	
Masterton	Gary Caffell^{R} (Ind)	Bex Johnson (Ind)	Stella Lennox (Ind)	Details	
Carterton	Ron Mark^{R} (Ind)	Steve Cretney (Ind)	Brian Deller (Ind)	Details	
South Wairarapa	Martin Connelly^{R} (Ind)	Fran Wilde (Ind)	Leah Hawkins (Ind)	Details	
Tasman	Tim King (Ind)		Timo Neubauer (Ind)	Details	
Nelson	Nick Smith (Ind)		Aaron Stallard (Ind)	Details	
Marlborough	Nadine Taylor (Ind)		Shaun Brown (MFP)	Details	
Buller	Jamie Cleine (Ind)	Chris Russell (Ind)	Jamie Cleine (Ind)	Details	
Grey	Tania Gibson (Ind)		Richard Osmaston (MFP)	Details	
Westland	Helen Lash (Ind)		Jacquie Grant (Ind)	Details	
Kaikōura	Craig Mackle (Ind)		John Diver (Ind)	Details	
Hurunui	Marie Black (Ind)		unopposed	Details	
Waimakariri	Dan Gordon (Ind)		Paul Williams (STFW)	Details	
Christchurch	Phil Mauger (Ind)		Sara Templeton (Ind)	Details	
Selwyn	Sam Broughton (Ind)	Lydia Gliddon (Ind)	Sam Broughton (Ind)	Details	
Ashburton	Neil Brown^{R} (Ind)	Liz McMillan (Ind)	Russell Ellis (Ind)	Details	
Timaru	Nigel Bowen (Ind)		Stu Piddington (Ind)	Details	
Mackenzie	Anne Munro^{R} (Ind)	Scott Aronsen (Ind)	Karen Morgan (Ind)	Details	
Waimate	Craig Rowley (Ind)		Sharyn Cain (Ind)	Details	
Waitaki	Gary Kircher^{R} (Ind)	Melanie Tavendale (Ind)	David Wilson (Ind)	Details	
Central Otago	Tamah Alley (Ind)		Charlie Sanders (Ind)	Details	
Queenstown Lakes	Glyn Lewers (Ind)	John Glover (Ind)	Glyn Lewers (Ind)	Details	
Dunedin	Jules Radich (TD)	Sophie Barker (Ind)	Andrew Simms (FD)	Details	
Clutha	Bryan Cadogan^{R} (Ind)	Jock Martin (Ind)	Ken Payne (Ind)	Details	
Southland	Rob Scott (Ind)		Gary Tong (Ind)	Details	
Gore	Ben Bell (Ind)		Nicky Davis (Ind)	Details	
Invercargill	Nobby Clark^{R} (LGI)	Tom Campbell (Ind)	Alex Crackett (Ind)	Details	
Chatham Islands	Monique Croon (Ind)	Greg Horler (Ind)	Monique Croon (Ind)	Details	
^{R} did not run for re-election

=== Local boards ===
For information on local boards refer to 2025 Auckland local board elections.

== Details ==
=== North Island ===
- Results in Northland
  - Far North District Council
  - Whangārei District Council (main)
  - Kaipara District Council
- Results in Auckland
  - Auckland Council
    - Local boards (main)
- Results in the Waikato
  - Thames-Coromandel District Council
  - Hauraki District Council (main)
  - Waikato District Council
  - Matamata-Piako District Council
  - Hamilton City Council (main)
  - Waipā District Council
  - Ōtorohanga District Council
  - South Waikato District Council
  - Waitomo District Council
  - Taupō District Council
- Results in the Bay of Plenty
  - Western Bay of Plenty District Council
  - Rotorua Lakes Council (main)
  - Whakatāne District Council
  - Kawerau District Council
  - Ōpōtiki District Council
- Results in Gisborne
  - Gisborne District Council
- Results in Hawke's Bay
  - Wairoa District Council
  - Hastings District Council (main)
  - Napier City Council (main)
  - Central Hawke's Bay District Council
- Results in Taranaki
  - New Plymouth District Council (main)
  - Stratford District Council
  - South Taranaki District Council
- Results in Manawatū-Whanganui
  - Ruapehu District Council
  - Whanganui District Council (main)
  - Rangitīkei District Council
  - Manawatū District Council
  - Palmerston North City Council (main)
  - Tararua District Council
  - Horowhenua District Council
- Results in Greater Wellington
  - Kāpiti Coast District Council (main)
  - Porirua City Council (main)
  - Upper Hutt City Council (main)
  - Hutt City Council (main)
  - Wellington City Council (main)
  - Masterton District Council
  - Carterton District Council
  - South Wairarapa District Council

=== South Island ===
- Results in the Upper South Island
  - Tasman District Council (main)
  - Nelson City Council (main)
  - Marlborough District Council
- Results in the West Coast
  - Buller District Council
  - Grey District Council
  - Westland District Council
- Results in Canterbury
  - Kaikōura District Council
  - Hurunui District Council
  - Waimakariri District Council
  - Christchurch City Council (main)
  - Selwyn District Council
  - Ashburton District Council
  - Timaru District Council
  - Mackenzie District Council
  - Waimate District Council
- Results in Otago
  - Waitaki District Council
  - Central Otago District Council
  - Queenstown-Lakes District Council (main)
  - Dunedin City Council (main)
  - Clutha District Council
- Results in Southland
  - Southland District Council
  - Gore District Council
  - Invercargill City Council (main)

=== Other ===
- Results in the Chatham Islands
  - Chatham Islands Council

== See also ==
- Results of the 2025 New Zealand regional council elections
- 2025 New Zealand local referendums on Māori wards and constituencies
