= Results of the 2025 New Zealand territorial authority elections in Taranaki =

2025 New Zealand territorial authority elections (Taranaki)
- 11 October 2025
- Turnout: 40,747 (46.75% ▲3.10 pp)
- 3 of 3 local councils
Party	Councils	+/–
No majority	3	0
This lists parties that won seats. See the complete results below.
- 3 mayors and 38 local councillors
Party	Seats	+/–
Mayors
Independent	3	0
Local councillors
Independent	37	0
ACT Local	1	+1
This lists parties that won seats. See the complete results below.

Elections for the territorial authorities of New Zealand were held from 9 September until 11 October 2025 as part of that year's nation-wide local elections. 709 local councillors and 66 mayors were elected across 66 of 67 councils.

3 territorial authorities are located within the Taranaki Region. 3 mayors and 38 district councillors were elected.

== Maps ==

Legend
Independent hold	Independent gain
	ACT Local gain

== Summary ==
=== Overall ===
Council	Electoral system	Seats	Mayor	Councillors	Control	Turnout	Details	Refs
New Plymouth	STV	14	▌ Independent gain	▌ Independent 13 (▼1) ▌ ACT Local 1 (▲1)	▌ No majority	28,625; 46.46% ▲1.44 pp	Details	
Stratford	FPP	11	▌ Independent hold	▌ Independent 11 ( 0)	▌ No majority	3,684; 53.74% ▲10.75 pp	Details	
South Taranaki	FPP	13	▌ Independent gain	▌ Independent 13 (▲1)	▌ No majority	8,438; 45.13% ▲5.80 pp	Details	
3 of 3 councils		38						

=== Mayors ===
Territorial authority	Incumbent	Elected	Runner-up	Details	Refs
New Plymouth	Neil Holdom^{R} (Ind)	Max Brough (Ind)	David Bublitz (Ind)	Details	
Stratford	Neil Volzke (Ind)		Jono Erwood (Ind)	Details	
South Taranaki	Phil Nixon (Ind)		Clem Coxhead (Ind)	Details	
^{R} did not run for re-election

=== Candidates ===
Party / ticket	Mayors				Councillors			
Party / ticket	2022	Candidates	Elected	+/−	2022	Candidates	Elected	+/−
Independent	3	13	3	0	37	83	37	0
ACT Local	no candidates				(new)	2	1	▲1
Te Rūnanga o Ngāti Ruanui Trust	no candidates				0	1	0	0
Te Pāti Māori	no candidates				1	0	0	▼1
Seats:	3		3	0	38		38	0

== New Plymouth District Council ==
2025 New Plymouth District Council election
- 11 October 2025
- Turnout: 28,625 (46.46% ▲1.44 pp)
- Mayor
	Ind	Ind	Ind
Candidate	Max Brough	David Bublitz	Sarah Lucas
Party	Independent	Independent	Independent
Final vote	13,984	6,286	5,763
Percentage	53.72%	24.15%	22.14%
Mayor before election
Neil Holdom
Independent
Elected mayor
Max Brough
Independent
- Councillors
- 14 seats on the governing body of New Plymouth District Council; 8 seats needed for a majority
Party	Seats	+/–
Independent	13	−1
ACT Local	1	+1
This lists parties that won seats. See the complete results below.
Control before	Control after
No majority	No majority

=== 2025 New Plymouth mayoral election ===
2025 New Plymouth mayoral election
Party	Candidate	Primary votes	%	±%	Iteration	
Party	Candidate	Primary votes	%	±%	#	Votes
Independent	Max Brough	not supplied	n/a	(new)	7th	13,984
Independent	David Bublitz	not supplied	n/a	(new)	7th	6,296
Independent	Sarah Lucas	not supplied	n/a	(new)	7th	5,763
Independent	Sam Bennett	not supplied	n/a	n/a	6th	2,676
Independent	John Woodward	not supplied	n/a	(new)	5th	1,978
Independent	Graham Chard	not supplied	n/a	(new)	4th	1,496
Independent	Peter Marra	not supplied	n/a	(new)	3rd	837
Independent	Greg Mackay	not supplied	n/a	n/a	2nd	395
Independent	Bill Simpson	287	1.00	−1.05	1st	287
Quota		14,108	49.29	−0.09		
Informal votes		61	0.21	−0.27		
Blank votes		348	1.22	+0.08		
Turnout		28,625	46.46	+1.44		
Registered electors		61,607				
Independent gain from Independent on 7th iteration						

=== At-large ward ===
2025 New Plymouth District at-large ward election
Party	Candidate	Primary votes	%	±%	Iteration	
Party	Candidate	Primary votes	%	±%	#	Votes
Independent	Murray Chong	9,566	33.42	(new)	1st	9,566
Independent	David Bublitz	4,743	16.57	(new)	1st	4,743
Independent	John Woodward	not supplied	n/a	(new)	22nd	4,702
Independent	Sam Bennett^{†}	not supplied	n/a	n/a	23rd	4,183
Independent	Dinnie Moeahu^{†}	not supplied	n/a	n/a	27th	3,915
Independent	Amanda Clinton-Gohdes^{†}	not supplied	n/a	n/a	27th	3,781
Independent	Mark Coster	not supplied	n/a	(new)	21st	1,893
Independent	Simon Chadwick	not supplied	n/a	(new)	20th	1,210
Independent	Teresa Goodin	not supplied	n/a	(new)	19th	1,011
Independent	Debbie Hancock	not supplied	n/a	(new)	17th	911
Independent	Greg Mackay	not supplied	n/a	n/a	15th	850
Independent	Sarah Ruth Sutherland	not supplied	n/a	(new)	11th	762
Independent	Steve Francis	not supplied	n/a	(new)	9th	589
Independent	Shaun Clare	not supplied	n/a	n/a	8th	519
Independent	Tina Koch	not supplied	n/a	(new)	6th	374
Independent	Wayne Williamson	not supplied	n/a	(new)	5th	354
Independent	Nigel Jones	not supplied	n/a	(new)	3rd	122
Quota		4,627	16.16	+0.84		
Informal votes		329	1.15	−4.63		
Blank votes		533	1.86	−1.83		
Turnout		28,625	46.46	+1.44		
Registered electors		61,607				
Independent gain from Independent on 1st iteration						
Independent gain from Independent on 1st iteration						
Independent gain from Independent on 22nd iteration						
Independent hold on 23rd iteration						
Independent hold on 27th iteration						
^{†} incumbent

=== Kaitake-Ngāmotu general ward ===
2025 Kaitāke-Ngāmotu general ward election
Party	Candidate	Primary votes	%	±%	Iteration	
Party	Candidate	Primary votes	%	±%	#	Votes
Independent	Gordon Travis Brown^{†}	2,832	13.96	−0.04	1st	2,832
Independent	Graham Chard	not supplied	n/a	n/a	10th	2,523
Independent	Moira Irving George	not supplied	n/a	(new)	18th	2,555
ACT Local	Damon Fox	not supplied	n/a	(new)	18th	2,480
Independent	Kerry Vosseler	not supplied	n/a	(new)	19th	2,390
Independent	EJ Barrett	not supplied	n/a	(new)	21st	2,365
Independent	Bryan Vickery^{†}	not supplied	n/a	n/a	21st	2,160
Independent	Adrian Sole	not supplied	n/a	(new)	17th	1,394
Independent	Peter Marra	not supplied	n/a	(new)	16th	779
Independent	Ewen Darling	not supplied	n/a	(new)	15th	681
Independent	Ross Johnston	not supplied	n/a	(new)	13th	634
Independent	Nikki Truman	not supplied	n/a	(new)	11th	544
Independent	Mullet Muzz McDowell	not supplied	n/a	(new)	9th	478
Independent	Pete Buis	not supplied	n/a	(new)	8th	442
Independent	Lani Mackie-Hunt	not supplied	n/a	(new)	7th	385
Independent	David Payne	not supplied	n/a	n/a	6th	341
Independent	Craig Tonkin	not supplied	n/a	(new)	5th	224
Independent	Michael Paul O'Sullivan	not supplied	n/a	n/a	4th	213
Independent	Mike Morresey	not supplied	n/a	(new)	2nd	117
Quota		2,535	12.50	−0.31		
Informal votes		1,296	6.39	+0.37		
Blank votes		1,247	6.15	+0.91		
Turnout		20,286	47.66	+0.85		
Registered electors		42,568				
Independent hold on 1st iteration						
Independent gain from Independent on 10th iteration						
Independent gain from Independent on 18th iteration						
ACT Local gain from Independent on 18th iteration						
Independent gain from Independent on 19th iteration						
Independent gain from Independent on 21st iteration						
^{†} incumbent

=== Kōhanga Moa general ward ===
2025 Kōhanga Moa geneal ward election
Party	Candidate	Primary votes	%	±%	Iteration	
Party	Candidate	Primary votes	%	±%	#	Votes
Independent	Christine Joy Fabish	not supplied	n/a	(new)	2nd	1,542
Independent	Sarah Lucas	not supplied	n/a	(new)	2nd	1,422
Independent	Jeremy Brooking	501	14.17	(new)	1st	501
Quota		1,595	45.12	n/a		
Informal votes		19	0.54	n/a		
Blank votes		327	9.25	n/a		
Turnout		3,535	48.53	n/a		
Registered electors		7,284				
Independent gain from Independent on 2nd iteration						

=== North general ward ===
2025 North general ward election
Party	Candidate	Primary votes	%	±%	Iteration	
Party	Candidate	Primary votes	%	±%	#	Votes
Independent	Gina Alicia Blackburn	not supplied	n/a	(new)	5th	1,115
Independent	Ian Cummings	not supplied	n/a	(new)	5th	918
Independent	Jonathan Marshall	not supplied	n/a	(new)	4th	719
Independent	Dayna Brent Jury	not supplied	n/a	(new)	3rd	548
Independent	Jane Elizabeth Parker-Bishop	not supplied	n/a	(new)	2nd	337
Independent	Bill Simpson	145	4.72	−7.62	1st	145
Quota		1,434	46.66	−0.10		
Informal votes		16	0.52	+0.26		
Blank votes		190	6.18	−0.04		
Turnout		3,073	43.99	−0.26		
Registered electors		6,985				
Independent gain from Independent on 5th iteration						

=== Te Purutanga Mauri Pūmanawa Māori ward ===
2025 Te Purutanga Mauri Pūmanawa Māori ward election
Party	Candidate	Primary votes	%	±%	Iteration	
Party	Candidate	Primary votes	%	±%	#	Votes
Independent	Te Waka McLeod^{†}	1,156	66.78	+2.17	1st	816
Independent	Peter Moeahu	545	31.48	(new)	1st	318
Quota		831	48.01	+3.12		
Informal votes		8	0.46	−0.73		
Blank votes		62	3.58	−5.37		
Turnout		1,731	36.29	+7.58		
Registered electors		4,770				
Independent hold on 1st iteration						
^{†} incumbent

=== Referendum on Māori wards ===
Choice	Votes	%
I vote to REMOVE Māori wards	15,004	55.47
I vote to KEEP Māori wards	12,046	44.53
Total	27,050	100.00
Valid votes	27,050	94.50
Invalid votes	11	0.04
Blank votes	1,564	5.46
Total votes	28,625	100.00
Registered voters/turnout	61,607	46.46
Source: NPDC & MCERT

== Stratford District Council ==
2025 Stratford District Council election
- 11 October 2025
- Turnout: 3,684 (53.74% ▲10.75 pp)
- Mayor
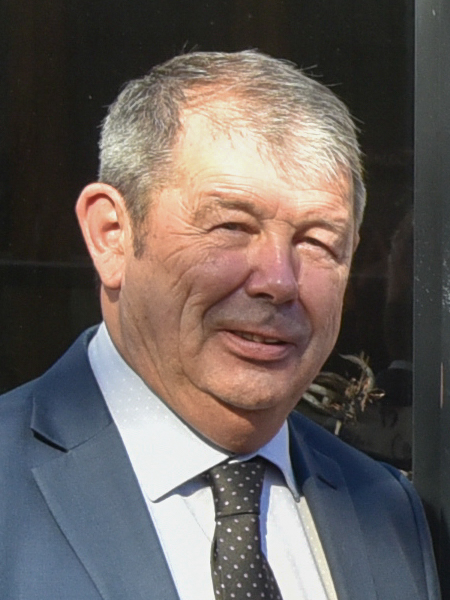
		Ind
Candidate	Neil Volzke	Jono Erwood
Party	Independent	Independent
Popular vote	1,935	1,707
Percentage	52.52%	46.34%
Mayor before election
Neil Volzke
Independent
Elected mayor
Neil Volzke
Independent
- Councillors
- 11 seats on the governing body of Stratford District Council; 6 seats needed for a majority
Party	Seats	+/–
Independent	11	0
This lists parties that won seats. See the complete results below.
Control before	Control after
No majority	No majority

=== 2025 Stratford mayoral election ===
2025 Stratford mayoral election
Party	Candidate	Votes	%	±%
Independent	Neil Volzke^{†}	1,935	52.52	n/a
Independent	Jono Erwood	1,707	46.34	(new)
Informal votes		2	0.05	n/a
Blank votes		40	1.09	n/a
Turnout		3,684	53.74	n/a
Registered electors		6,855		
Independent hold				
^{†} incumbent

=== Stratford Urban general ward ===
2025 Stratford Urban general ward election
Party	Candidate	Votes	%	±%
Independent	Jono Erwood^{†}	1,467	65.35	n/a
Independent	Annette Dudley^{†}	1,385	61.69	n/a
Independent	Josh Best	1,242	55.32	(new)
Independent	Mathew Watt^{†}	1,038	46.24	n/a
Independent	Ellen Elizabeth Hall^{†}	1,028	45.79	n/a
Independent	Jaimie Bertie	1,020	45.43	(new)
Independent	Brendon Christopher Gernhoefer	992	44.19	(new)
Independent	Mike Procter	588	26.19	(new)
Independent	Laurie Gooch	502	22.36	(new)
Independent	Alan Ross Tolland	486	21.65	(new)
Independent	Brad Colin Jones	460	20.49	(new)
Independent	Peter McNamara	305	13.59	(new)
Informal votes		8	0.36	n/a
Blank votes		29	1.29	n/a
Turnout		2,245	55.05	n/a
Registered electors		4,078		
Independent hold				
Independent hold				
Independent gain from Independent				
Independent hold				
Independent hold				
Independent gain from Independent				
^{†} incumbent

=== Stratford Rural general ward ===
2025 Rural general ward election
Party	Candidate	Votes	%	±%
Independent	Steve Beck^{†}	elected unopposed		
Independent	Grant Boyde^{†}	elected unopposed		
Independent	Amanda Kay Harris^{†}	elected unopposed		
Independent	Katherine Sextus	elected unopposed		
Registered electors		2,431		
Independent hold				
Independent hold				
Independent hold				
Independent gain from Independent				
^{†} incumbent

=== Stratford Māori ward ===
2025 Stratford Māori ward election
Party	Candidate	Votes	%	±%
Independent	David Kimball Kinane Chadwick	48	36.64	(new)
Independent	Karley Hemopo	44	33.59	(new)
Te Rūnanga o Ngāti Ruanui Trust	Hemi Haddon	36	27.48	(new)
Informal votes		0	0.00	n/a
Blank votes		3	2.29	n/a
Turnout		131	37.86	n/a
Registered electors		346		
Independent gain from Independent				

=== Referendum on Māori wards ===
Choice	Votes	%
I vote to REMOVE Māori wards	2,170	62.18
I vote to KEEP Māori wards	1,320	37.82
Total	3,490	100.00
Valid votes	3,490	94.73
Invalid votes	2	0.05
Blank votes	192	5.21
Total votes	3,684	100.00
Registered voters/turnout	6,855	53.74
Source: SDC & MCERT

== South Taranaki District Council ==
2025 South Taranaki District Council election
- 11 October 2025
- Turnout: 8,438 (45.13% ▲5.80 pp)
- Mayor
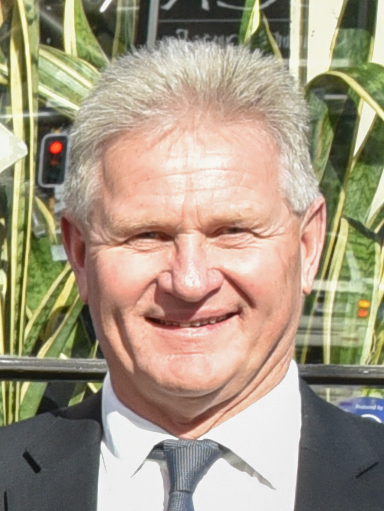
		Ind
Candidate	Phil Nixon	Clem Coxhead
Party	Independent	Independent
Popular vote	5,974	2,177
Percentage	70.80%	25.80%
Mayor before election
Phil Nixon
Independent
Elected mayor
Phil Nixon
Independent
- Councillors
- 13 seats on the governing body of Stratford District Council; 7 seats needed for a majority
Party	Seats	+/–
Independent	13	+1
This lists parties that won seats. See the complete results below.
Control before	Control after
No majority	No majority

=== 2025 South Taranaki mayoral election ===
2025 South Taranaki mayoral election
Party	Candidate	Votes	%	±%
Independent	Phil Nixon^{†}	5,974	70.80	−15.01
Independent	Clem Coxhead	2,177	25.80	(new)
Informal votes		3	0.04	+0.01
Blank votes		284	3.37	−1.33
Turnout		8,438	45.13	+5.80
Registered electors		18,696		
Independent hold				
^{†} incumbent

=== Eltham-Kaponga general ward ===
2025 Eltham-Kaponga general ward election
Party	Candidate	Votes	%	±%
Independent	Mark Charles Bellringer^{†}	585	51.68	n/a
Independent	Karen Jean Cave	578	51.06	(new)
Independent	Steffy Mackay^{†}	499	44.08	n/a
Independent	Tim Taylor	298	26.33	(new)
Informal votes		4	0.35	n/a
Blank votes		44	3.89	n/a
Turnout		1,132	41.47	n/a
Registered electors		2,730		
Independent hold				
Independent gain from Independent				
^{†} incumbent

=== Pātea general ward ===
2025 Pātea general ward election
Party	Candidate	Votes	%	±%
Independent	Robert Northcott^{†}	elected unopposed		
Independent	Brian Stanley Rook^{†}	elected unopposed		
Registered electors		2,168		
Independent hold				
Independent hold				
^{†} incumbent

=== Taranaki Coastal general ward ===
2025 Taranaki Coastal general ward election
Party	Candidate	Votes	%	±%
Independent	Janet Fleming	887	60.50	(new)
Independent	Auran Steven Langton^{†}	860	58.66	n/a
Independent	Bryan Wynyard Roach^{†}	774	52.80	n/a
Informal votes		0	0.00	n/a
Blank votes		46	3.14	n/a
Turnout		1,466	44.71	n/a
Registered electors		3,279		
Independent gain from Independent				
Independent hold				
^{†} incumbent

=== Te Hāwera general ward ===
2025 Te Hāwera general ward election
Party	Candidate	Votes	%	±%
Independent	Andy Beccard^{†}	2,857	74.95	n/a
Independent	Diana Reid^{†}	2,718	71.30	n/a
Independent	Racquel Jane Cleaver-Pittams^{†}	2,600	68.21	(new)
Independent	Heather Brokenshire	2,493	65.40	(new)
Independent	Garth Weir	1,858	48.74	(new)
Independent	Te Aroha Louie Rauhuia Hohaia^{†}	1,117	29.30	n/a
Independent	Ngawai Hernandez-Walden	676	17.73	(new)
Informal votes		1	0.03	n/a
Blank votes		52	1.36	n/a
Turnout		3,812	48.30	n/a
Registered electors		7,893		
Independent hold				
Independent hold				
Independent hold				
Independent gain from Independent				
Independent gain from Independent				
^{†} incumbent

=== Te Kūrae Māori ward ===
2025 Te Kūrae Māori ward election
Party	Candidate	Votes	%	±%
Independent	Leanne Kuraroa Horo^{†}	255	56.29	−7.60
Independent	Caroline Aroha Waiwiri	180	39.74	+8.84
Informal votes		0	0.00	+0.00
Blank votes		18	3.97	−1.24
Turnout		453	41.67	+13.38
Registered electors		1,087		
Independent hold				
^{†} incumbent

=== Te Tai Tonga Māori ward ===
2025 Te Tai Tonga Māori ward election
Party	Candidate	Votes	%	±%
Independent	Cheryl Ngapeita Luke-Maraki	elected unopposed		
Registered electors		1,539		
Independent gain from Te Pāti Māori				

=== Referendum on Māori wards ===
Choice	Votes	%
I vote to REMOVE Māori wards	4,370	54.24
I vote to KEEP Māori wards	3,687	45.76
Total	8,057	100.00
Valid votes	8,057	95.48
Invalid votes	3	0.04
Blank votes	378	4.48
Total votes	8,438	100.00
Registered voters/turnout	18,696	45.13
Source: STDC & MCERT

== See also ==
- 2025 Taranaki Regional Council election
