= Bali Haque =

New Zealand educationalist

Bali Haque MNZM
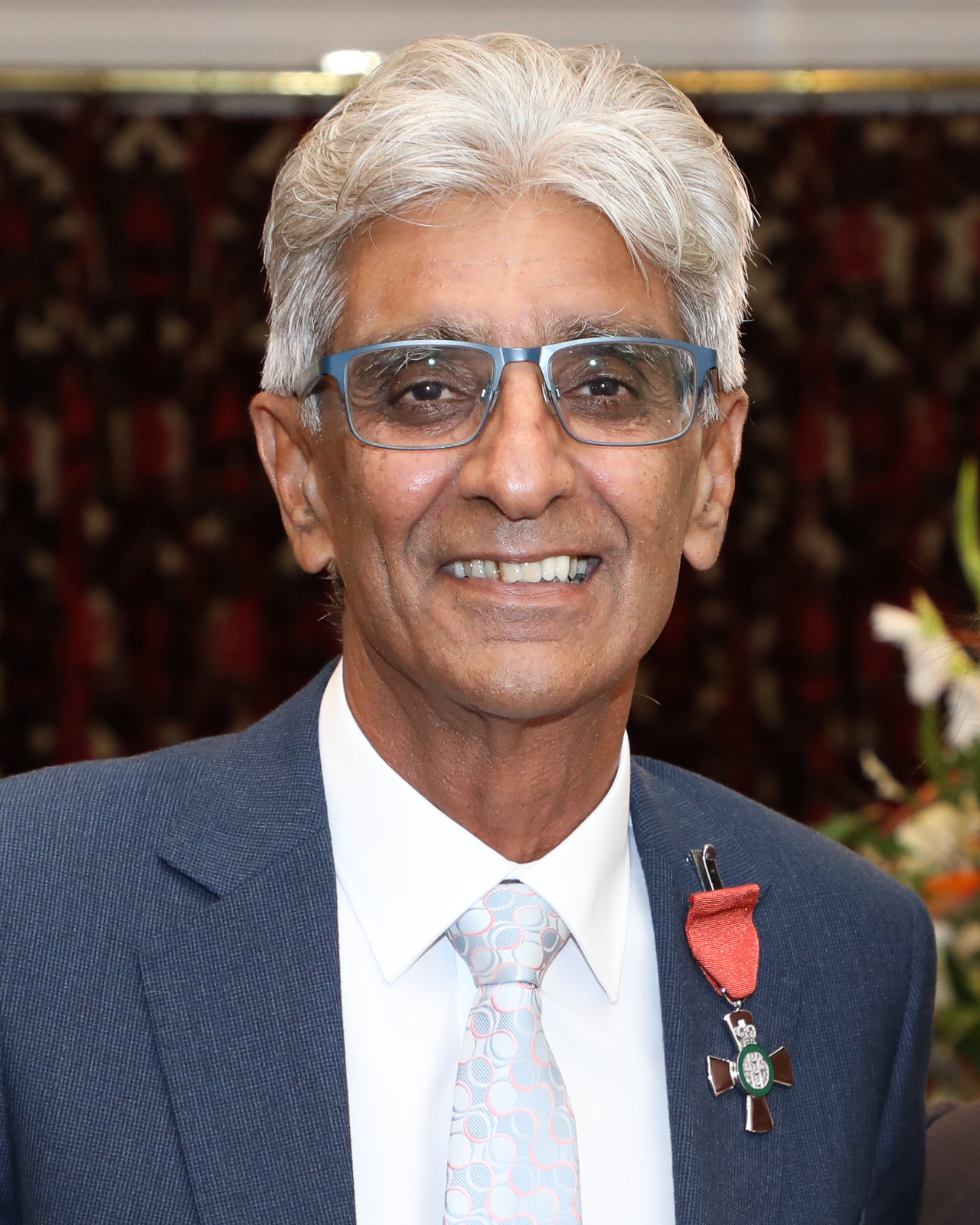
- Haque in 2022
- Born: Pakistan
- Occupation: Educationalist
- Known for: Leadership in New Zealand education; Chairperson of the Independent Taskforce to review Tomorrow's Schools

Iqbal Manzoor Haque MNZM, commonly known as Bali Haque, is a New Zealand educator. His career has included four principalships, advocacy and support in a range of professional associations, serving as deputy chief executive officer of the New Zealand Qualifications Authority (NZQA) and as chair of the Independent Taskforce commissioned by the Sixth Labour Government in 2018 to review Tomorrow's Schools. Haque is a frequent commentator on educational issues and his contributions have been described as "characterised by a scholarly analysis and a socially critical disposition". He has published two books and as of 2023 is a member of the New Plymouth District Council.

== Early life and education ==
Born in Pakistan, Haque moved with his parents when he was three years of age to the United Kingdom. He received his early schooling in London in the 1960s, a period he has noted as difficult because of racism against immigrants at the time. He attended Holloway Comprehensive School in London and gained a BSc(Honours) degree in economics, from Hull University in 1972. Haque completed his teacher training at Garnett College in 1973, and graduated from Massey University in 1995 with the degree of Master of Educational Administration and Leadership (Hons).

== Teaching and principalships ==
Haque began his teaching career in 1975 at Caludon Castle School in the United Kingdom, moving to New Zealand to take up a position teaching economics and accounting at Spotswood College from 1975 to 1977. After two years teaching back in the United Kingdom, Haque returned to New Zealand and was employed as head of economics at Spotswood College from 1982 to 1987, being appointed deputy principal in 1988.

Haque was principal of Tamatea High School from 1992 to 1995, moving to Rosehill College in 1995 where he was principal until 2003. As New Zealand moved toward a change in the assessment system in the country's high schools, Haque commented in 2001 that the proposed National Certificate of Educational Achievement had widespread support but the sector needed to ensure the debate was kept open for all stakeholders, even those schools that disagreed with the changes. Between 2003 and 2006, Haque was principal of Pakuranga College, later acknowledged in 2018 as a former principal of the school, for his leadership role in a Government-appointed taskforce to review key aspects of the New Zealand education system. In 2022, he was one of three former principals of the college honoured for their contributions to the school, when a newly opened facility was named the Haque Building. Partly funded by the Ministry of Education, the Haque Building provided a construction template designed to be flexible to suit "different learning needs and subjects", and as the principal Michael Williams noted, was part of the school's plan to create "modern learning spaces for students".

In 2012, Haque became principal at Tereora College, Cook Islands, holding the position until 2015. Early in his role at the college, Haque expressed concern about the amount of time some students were taking off school and while he acknowledged it was often to attend cultural or sporting events and ultimately the decision rested with the families, they could still be academically disadvantaged by the end of the year. He announced in September 2014 that the college had created an online portal for parents to monitor the progress of their children, providing access to NCEA credit summaries, attendance, timetables and fees. Haque said this information-sharing system was part of the school's learning charter and also ensured that staff were held accountable. The college was selected in 2013 to pilot the Young Entrepreneurs Scheme. Haque explained that for this programme, funded by the New Zealand Agency for International Development, students were required "to go through the process of market research, get a product, sell the product, market it and then do the wrap up in terms of the accounting for it, profits they've made, lost they've made, dividends they pay – absolutely running a business". During the programme, members of the local business community offered mentoring for students to "develop their skills in accounting, marketing, and human resource management". When Tania Morgan retired in 2023 after eight years as principal of Tereora College, she acknowledged Haque as one of the previous principals who exposed her to different leadership styles.

== Professional associations ==
As president (2003/2004) and executive member of the Secondary Principals' Association of New Zealand (SPANZ), Haque provided leadership and advocacy for teachers and principals. SPANZ released a staffing survey in 2003 that raised concerns about the quality of teachers being employed for some subjects. In his role as president, Haque said this reflected "a demand and supply issue" when compromises were likely to be made during a time of shortage due to an increase in roll numbers at secondary schools, but it was important that it did not affect the quality of education as there was little parents could do about this. Later in 2003, when SPANZ challenged the New Zealand government over the impact of financial constraints on secondary schools, Haque claimed the "woefully inadequate" funding was creating anger amongst principals due to "extra demands continually being placed on schools without the resources needed to make them work".

As of 2023, Haque remains a trustee for Toi Foundation, a position he has held since 2018. Between 2020 and 2022, he was a board member at Ako Mātātupu. Teach First NZ, the flagship programme of Ako Mātātupu, trains secondary school teachers within the context of "working to address inequities in the education system through indigenous and socially innovative approaches to teaching and leadership".

== Government appointments ==
=== New Zealand Qualifications Authority ===
Haque joined the New Zealand Qualifications Authority (NZQA) in September 2006 at a time when the organisation was under public scrutiny for issues around achievement levels of students in New Zealand Scholarship examinations. He held the role of deputy chief executive, qualifications division, of NZQA from 2006 until 2011, with the specific responsibility for managing the National Certificate of Educational Achievement (NCEA), in particular establishing "quality assurance of both internal and external assessment and the analysis and publication of results". When achievement data for more than 150,000 secondary students in New Zealand went online in 2007, Haque entered the debate about whether internal assessment was undermining qualifications. He noted that NZQA was implementing Government policy for assessment that was standards-based and used both internal and external measures, concluding that NCEA was "internationally recognised as robust and credible...[and]...each level of the National Qualifications Framework (NQF) is specifically described so that the standards and the qualifications in the NQF can be compared internationally".

An editorial in the New Zealand Herald in 2008 welcomed the announcement of a government review of NCEA, acknowledging that while there had been more "consistency and certainty" of the examination system within the country's secondary schools, there were still issues to be addressed around moderation of internal assessment and the complex question of "credit parity between assessment and unit standards". NZQA agreed that dealing with these issues was key to the review and Haque said it was "a chance to recognise how far that assessment development has come and the validity of much of the criticism". There was debate about the proposed review in the media between politicians Anne Tolley and Chris Carter, but it was noted that it would be done by a panel of experts from across the education sector with the reviewed standards being assessed by NZQA's technical overview group of university professors. Haque concluded it was "a rare opportunity to align the curriculum development process with the assessment development process".

In May 2010, NZQA released the first Annual Report on NCEA and New Zealand Scholarship Data and Statistics (2009). In the report's introduction, co-authored by Haque, the report was said to summarise "the activity and achievement of New Zealand's secondary school students since the full implementation of the National Certificates of Educational Achievement (NCEAs) in 2004", and stated that a strength of the NCEA system was it allowed a student's performance to be analysed over time, and was a move away from norm-referenced testing to show achievement against standards and not relative to other students. Radio New Zealand noted that the data in the Report showed gaps between "Māori and non-Māori, Pasifika and non-Pasifika, and girls and boys...[but]...one of the largest gaps was between rich and poor schools". In reply, Haque said that "factors like decile, student numbers and the courses offered will affect each school's results." Improvements were evident in the Annual Report on NCEA and New Zealand Scholarship Data and Statistics (2010) which recorded:

In 2010 there were encouraging increases in attainment of NCEA qualifications over 2009 across all NCEA levels. In particular, the attainment gaps between Māori and Pasifika candidates on one hand, and European and Asian candidates on the other hand, reduced at all NCEA levels. The attainment gaps between Māori and Pasifika students and students of other ethnicities are now significantly smaller than they were in 2004, the first year of full implementation of NCEA.

In an interview in 2023, Haque reflected on his years as deputy chief executive at NZQA and the structural changes he was involved in to address a demoralised, "inward-looking" culture within the organisation and restore public credibility in a national qualification.

=== Ministerial taskforce to review Tomorrow's Schools ===
The New Zealand Government announced a review of Tomorrow's Schools in 2018 by an independent taskforce to be chaired by Haque. One media commentator noted at the time that in his book Changing our Secondary Schools (2014), Haque had presented the view that while the Tomorrow's Schools model had its problems, he did not advocate doing away with it totally, and in his opinion it was not necessary "to return to the top-down centralised system of old". Writing in the New Zealand Herald in July 2018, Haque had previously claimed the New Zealand model of devolved education had reduced bureaucracy and allowed schools to function within a competitive business model that favoured advantaged communities, but struggled to support schools with large numbers of disadvantaged students. He suggested that the problems would not be solved by "ad hoc tinkering and well meaning intentions".

While the Taskforce's draft review was going through the process of public consultation in December 2018 Haque spoke frequently in the media and at community meetings to clarify the rationale for many of the suggested changes, contending that while most people agreed things needed to be done differently, anxiety was understandable. He said some of the details of the recommendations were likely to change after consultation, and would take several years to fully implement. When questioned about why hubs, which were recommended by the taskforce to replace regional Ministry of Education offices and assume some of the powers held by school boards of trustees, had no elected positions, Haque said it was about better organisation, not representation, and the taskforce's position was that education could "no longer be a political football". In an interview on New Zealand morning television, Haque said the review had been necessary to address the workload of school boards and staff under the current devolved system where there were few incentives for schools to work together. The system, he suggested, created inequalities between and within schools and the proposed education hubs would provide advice, professional development and support for schools to work collaboratively with their communities. At the political level, Haque contended that the report provided "an opportunity for cross-party conversations and an accord [which] all agree to and support". The final report was released to the public in September 2019.

On 4 February 2021, Haque supported calls from the Principals' Federation for the Ministry of Education to provide more leadership in the face of poor results by students in a range of international and national tests. Haque claimed the problem was a system that paid little attention to curriculum development and did not provide good professional development or leadership support for principals. He expressed concern that the government was taking an ad hoc approach and stood by the taskforce's recommendation for the creation of a "new Crown organisation that would operate regional hubs to support schools". Haque argued that some of the reforms had not gone far enough in making "substantial and cultural" changes that would create a real opportunity to "coordinate the health and education reforms". Later he said the goal of the review was to recommend improvements in the education system so everyone got "a fair go", and although "pleasing progress" was being made, the process to implement changes needed to be sped up.

In the lead-up to the 2023 general election, Haque claimed that an overloaded and depleted workforce in the country's schools, combined with curriculum changes and a restructuring of the Ministry of Education, which he said were "incoherent, poorly planned, with impossible timelines", had resulted in an understandable polarisation of conversations about educational issues and policies. In a critique of the government's response to the recommendations of the taskforce, Haque put the case that the implementation of the proposed changes was appalling. He concluded that dysfunction within the Ministry of Education needed to be addressed, cross-party agreements were required to deal with problems in the system and a strong national network of support for schools was necessary if the reforms were to be effectively implemented. In September 2023, Haque restated this position. He agreed with several principals that there had been progress and that COVID-19 had hindered the government in making many of the changes following the review, but he remained disappointed because successive governments had been unable to "resolve significant disparities in student achievement over the past 30 years" and neither of the major political parties in 2023 appeared to "have policies that would achieve more than tinkering at the edges of the school system".

== Local-body politics ==
Haque stood in the Kaitake-Ngāmotu ward in the local-body elections for the New Plymouth District Council in 2022. During the campaign he questioned the timing of the advertising for a new chief executive, saying this should have happened after the elections to allow the new council to develop the job description as an "essential part" of the recruitment process. Later, when an appointment of an interim chief executive went ahead, Haque said he believed the decision was the correct one, although he questioned why a position with a short-term contract had been accorded the status of "full authority". Earlier in the campaign, Haque took the position of supporting the establishment of a Māori ward. He was elected to the New Plymouth District Council, and assumed the role of chairperson of the council's Strategy and Operations Committee.

Haque is not standing for re-election to the New Plymouth District Council in the 2025 local elections.

== Awards and honours ==
In the 2021 Queen's Birthday Honours, Haque was appointed a Member of the New Zealand Order of Merit, for services to education governance. Haque said the award was part of a team effort and he acknowledged his family for their support.

Haque received an honorary doctorate in education from Massey University on 25 November 2022 in recognition of his service to education. Vice-chancellor Professor Jan Thomas said Haque "exemplifies the 'value add' of a professional postgraduate qualification undertaken in mid-career and amply demonstrates the multiple ways in which talented Massey University graduates contribute significantly to the national economic and social good".

In 2005, Haque was a co-recipient of the Service to Education Award from the Secondary Principals' Association of New Zealand.

== Publications ==
- Changing our Secondary Schools (2014). The New Zealand Herald called the book "hard hitting" with some of its suggestions for change, including performance-based pay for teachers, a recommended reduction in holidays and raising awareness of principals behaving "selfishly in the competitive climate set up by New Zealand's education system", likely to be controversial. Haque acknowledged in the same piece that while "most teachers do a great job and that socio-economic factors are most important when looking at the 'tail' of student underachievement", it was important to address issues of competence and management of teachers' workloads. Peter O'Connor from the University of Auckland situated the book within the debate about the impact of the rapid implementation of Tomorrow's Schools into the New Zealand education system in the late 1980s and endorsed Haque's critique of those changes and his suggestion that the focus needed to be on what schools could do to support students "left behind by poverty." O'Connor concluded: "Haque's book is timely because we have witnessed more than 30 years of education reforms in this country and yet we haven't made the real progress such attention suggests we could or should have made. Poorly implemented, poorly thought through policy that has pitted governments against teachers has meant we still haven't addressed some of the big and hard questions facing us."
- New Zealand Secondary Schools and your Child a Guide for Parents (2017). One reviewer said the book provided an "incredibly informative, no-nonsense, and jargon-free" guide for parents and students "navigating secondary school" in New Zealand. Haque noted the book was about addressing a disconnect between schools and families as a result of an increasingly complicated secondary school system. He acknowledged that teachers and principals wanted parents to get more involved, but there was confusion about how schools worked and what families could do if there were problems. Haque contended that the sector had been under pressure to implement changes since the introduction of Tomorrow's Schools and this had overloaded principals, allowed less focus on teaching and learning and increased the confusion. Information is provided in the book for parents on "factors including enrolment zones, understanding the curriculum, school reports, homework and bullying."
