= 2025 Queenstown Lakes District Council election =

Elections in New Zealand

- 11 October 2025
- Turnout: 12,927 (41.54% ▼2.93 pp)
- Mayor
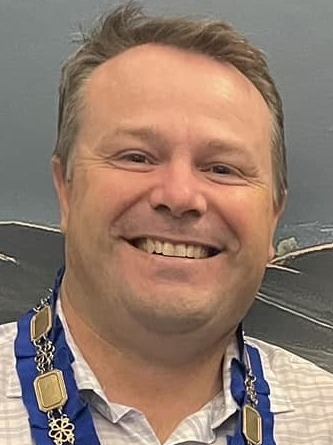
	Ind
Candidate	John Glover	Glyn Lewers
Party	Independent	Independent
Popular vote	4,599	3,244
Percentage	35.58%	25.09%
	Ind	Ind
Candidate	Nik Kiddle	Darren Rewi
Party	Independent	Independent
Popular vote	2,108	1,671
Percentage	16.31%	12.93%
Mayor before election
Glyn Lewers
Independent
Elected mayor
John Glover
Independent
- Councillors
- 11 seats on the governing body of Queenstown Lakes District Council; 6 seats needed for a majority
Party	Seats	+/–
Independent	11	0
This lists parties that won seats. See the complete results below.

The 2025 Queenstown Lakes District Council election was a local election held from 9 September to 11 October in the Queenstown Lakes District of New Zealand, as part of that year's territorial authority elections and other local elections held nation-wide.

Voters elected the mayor of Queenstown Lakes, 11 district councillors, and other local representatives for the 2025–2028 term of the Queenstown Lakes District Council. Postal voting and the first-past-the-post voting system were used.

John Glover won the mayoralty, defeating incumbent mayor Glyn Lewers.

== Key dates ==
- 4 July 2025: Nominations for candidates opened
- 1 August 2025: Nominations for candidates closed at 12 pm
- 9 September 2025: Voting documents were posted and voting opened
- 11 October 2025: Voting closed at 12 pm and progress/preliminary results were published
- 16–19 October 2025: Final results were declared.

== Background ==
=== Positions up for election ===
Voters in the district elected the mayor of Queenstown Lakes, 11 district councillors in 3 wards, and the members of the Wānaka-Upper Clutha Community Board. They also elected several members to the Otago Regional Council. (Note: Four members in the Dunstan general constituency.)

== List of candidates ==
=== Incumbents not seeking re-election ===
- Esther Whitehead, councillor for the Queenstown-Whakatipu ward

=== Mayor ===
Candidate	Affiliation (Note: A candidate may leave their affiliation blank, run as an independent, or run with an affiliation to an organisation, local body ticket or political party. Queenstown-Lakes District Council does not allow whānau, hapū, or iwi details to be used for the affiliation.)	Notes
Al Angus	None	Previously ran for mayor in 2022
John Glover	None	Hotel owner. Ran in the 2023 Arrowtown-Kawarau by-election.
Nik Kiddle	Independent	Mayoral candidate in 2019
Glyn Lewers	None	Incumbent mayor since 2022
Darren Rewi	None	Chair of Mana Tahuna Charitable Trust
Daniel Shand	Independent (Direct Democracy)	Previously ran for the mayoralty in 2022

=== Councillors ===
==== Queenstown-Whakatipu general ward ====
Queenstown-Whakatipu general ward returned four councillors to the district council.

Candidate	Affiliation	Notes
Gavin Bartlett	None	Incumbent councillor
Stephen Brent	None	Lawyer and chair of 45South Community Foundation
Aaron Cowie	Independent	
Craig "Ferg" Ferguson	None	Incumbent councillor
Jon Mitchell	Independent	Previously ran for the mayoralty in 2022
Rene Smith	None	
Matt Wong	Independent	Incumbent councillor

==== Wānaka-Upper Clutha general ward ====
Wānaka-Upper Clutha general ward returned four councillors to the district council.

Candidate	Affiliation	Notes
Barry Bruce	None	Incumbent councillor
Lyal Cocks	None	Incumbent councillor
Craig Gasson	None	
Niki Gladding	Independent	Incumbent councillor for the Queenstown-Whakatipu ward
Nicola King	None	
Yeverley McCarthy	None	
Quentin Smith	None	Incumbent deputy mayor
Cody Tucker	None	Incumbent councillor
Thorsk G Westphal	None	

==== Arrowtown-Kawarau general ward ====
Arrowtown-Kawarau general ward returned three councillors to the district council.

Candidate	Affiliation	Notes
"Q" (Samuel) Belk	None	
Heath Copland	None	Previously ran for council in 2019
Lisa Guy	None	Incumbent councillor
Tim Manning	None	
Melissa White	None	Incumbent councillor

== Results ==
Overall turnout for this election was 41.16%, with 12,927 voting papers returned.

With the final results, the following candidates were declared elected:

=== Mayor ===
John Glover won the mayoralty, defeating incumbent mayor Glyn Lewers.

2025 Queenstown Lakes mayoral election
Party	Candidate	Votes	%	±%
Independent	John Glover	4,599	35.58	(new)
Independent	Glyn Lewers^{†}	3,244	25.09	−9.99
Independent	Nik Kiddle	2,108	16.31	(new)
Independent	Darren Rewi	1,671	12.93	(new)
Independent	Al Angus	874	6.76	+0.19
Independent	Daniel Shand	125	0.97	−0.64
Informal votes		36	0.28	+0.04
Blank votes		270	2.09	−0.33
Turnout		12,927	41.54	−2.93
Registered electors		31,118		
Independent gain from Independent				
^{†} incumbent

=== Councillors ===
==== Queenstown-Whakatipu Ward ====
2025 Queenstown-Whakatipu ward election
Party	Candidate	Votes	%	±%
Independent	Matt Wong^{†}	2,287	61.89	−2.34
Independent	Gavin Bartlett^{†}	2,002	54.18	+7.34
Independent	Stephen Brent	1,924	52.07	(new)
Independent	Jon Mitchell	1,689	45.71	(new)
Independent	Craig 'Ferg' Ferguson	1,648	44.60	(new)
Independent	Aaron Cowie	1,349	36.51	(new)
Independent	Rene Smith	904	24.47	(new)
Informal votes		4	0.11	+0.03
Blank votes		55	1.49	−4.11
Turnout		3,695	35.36	−4.81
Registered electors		10,451		
Independent hold				
Independent hold				
Independent gain from Independent				
Independent gain from Independent				
^{†} incumbent

==== Wānaka-Upper Clutha Ward ====
2025 Arrowtown-Kawarau ward election
Party	Candidate	Votes	%	±%
Independent	Heath Copland	1,927	54.71	(new)
Independent	Melissa White	1,730	49.12	+20.26
Independent	Q (Samuel) Belk	1,703	48.35	(new)
Independent	Lisa Guy^{†}	1,518	43.10	−7.43
Independent	Tim Manning	1,448	41.11	(new)
Informal votes		7	0.20	+0.15
Blank votes		117	3.32	−0.42
Turnout		3,522	41.71	−5.19
Registered electors		8,444		
Independent gain from Independent				
Independent gain from Independent				
Independent gain from Independent				
^{†} incumbent

==== Arrowtown-Kawarau Ward ====
2025 Queenstown-Whakatipu ward election
Party	Candidate	Votes	%	±%
Independent	Matt Wong^{†}	2,287	61.89	−2.34
Independent	Gavin Bartlett^{†}	2,002	54.18	+7.34
Independent	Stephen Brent	1,924	52.07	(new)
Independent	Jon Mitchell	1,689	45.71	(new)
Independent	Craig 'Ferg' Ferguson	1,648	44.60	(new)
Independent	Aaron Cowie	1,349	36.51	(new)
Independent	Rene Smith	904	24.47	(new)
Informal votes		4	0.11	+0.03
Blank votes		55	1.49	−4.11
Turnout		3,695	35.36	−4.81
Registered electors		10,451		
Independent hold				
Independent hold				
Independent gain from Independent				
Independent gain from Independent				
^{†} incumbent

== See also ==
- 2025 Otago Regional Council election
- 2025 Dunedin City Council election
