= 2025 New Plymouth District Council election =

Elections in New Zealand

- 11 October 2025
- Turnout: 28,625 (46.46% ▲1.44 pp)
- Mayor
	Ind	Ind	Ind
Candidate	Max Brough	David Bublitz	Sarah Lucas
Party	Independent	Independent	Independent
Final vote	13,984	6,286	5,763
Mayor before election
Neil Holdom
Independent
Elected mayor
Max Brough
Independent
- Councillors
- 14 seats on the governing body of New Plymouth District Council; 8 seats needed for a majority
Party	Seats	+/–
Independent	13	−1
ACT Local	1	+1
This lists parties that won seats. See the complete results below.

The 2025 New Plymouth District Council election was a local election held from 9 September to 11 October in the New Plymouth District of New Zealand, as part of that year's territorial authority elections and other local elections held nation-wide.

Voters elected the mayor of New Plymouth, 14 district councillors, and other local representatives for the 2025–2028 term of the New Plymouth District Council. Postal voting and the single transferable voting system were used.

Councillor Max Brough won the mayoralty in a landslide, with incumbent mayor Neil Holdom not having stood for re-election.

The council introduced a Māori ward at the 2022 election; in a referendum on its future held at this election (as part of a nation-wide series of referendums) voters elected to remove the Māori ward for future elections.

== Key dates ==
- 4 July 2025: Nominations for candidates opened
- 1 August 2025: Nominations for candidates closed at 12 pm
- 9 September 2025: Voting documents were posted and voting opened
- 11 October 2025: Voting closed at 12 pm and progress/preliminary results were published
- 16–19 October 2025: Final results were declared.

== Background ==
=== Positions up for election ===
Voters in the district elected the mayor of New Plymouth, 14 councillors from 5 wards, and the members of five community boards (Clifton, Inglewood, Kaitake, Puketapu-Bell Block, and Waitara). They also elected members of the Taranaki Regional Council. (Note: 5 members from the district in the New Plymouth general constituency; 2 members from the district in the North Taranaki general constituency; 1 member partially from the district in the Taranaki Māori constituency.)

== List of candidates ==
=== Incumbents not seeking re-election ===
- Tony Bedford, councillor since 2019
- Harry Duynhoven, former mayor (2010–2013) and councillor since a 2015 by-election
- Bali Haque, councillor since 2022
- Anneka Carlson Matthews, councillor since 2019
- Neil Holdom, mayor since 2016
- Marie Pearce, councillor since 2010

=== Mayor ===
Candidate	Affiliation (Note: A candidate may leave their affiliation blank, run as an independent, or run with an affiliation to an organisation, local body ticket or political party. New Plymouth District Council does not allow election slogans to be used for the affiliation.)	Notes
Sam Bennett	Independent	Previously ran for the mayoralty in 2022. Incumbent councillor for the at-large ward. Also ran for re-election as a councillor.
Max Brough	Independent	Incumbent at-large councillor. Previously ran for the mayoralty in 2019.
David Bublitz	Independent	Incumbent deputy mayor and Kaitake-Ngāmotu general ward councillor. Also ran to be a councillor for the at-large ward.
Graham Chard	None	Incumbent chair of the Kaitake Community Board. Also ran to be a councillor for the Kaitake Ngāmotu ward.
Sarah Lucas	None	Inglewood community board member. Also ran to be a councillor for the Kōhanga Moa general ward.
Greg Mackay	None	Previously ran for the mayoralty in 2019 and 2022. Also ran as a councillor in the at-large ward.
Peter Marra	None	Also ran as a councillor in the Kaitake-Ngāmotu general ward
Bill Simpson	None	Also ran to be a councillor for the North general ward
John Woodward	Independent	Former police officer. Also ran to be a councillor for the at-large ward.

==== Withdrawn ====
- Murray Chong, incumbent councillor for the Kaitake-Ngāmotu ward, had indicated in May that he would run for the mayoralty, but instead just ran for re-election as a councillor.
- Murray "Mullet Muzz" McDowell, had previously indicated that he would run for the mayoralty, but instead just ran to be elected as a councillor for the Kaitake-Ngāmotu ward.

=== Councillors ===
==== Te Purutanga Mauri Pūmanawa Māori ward ====
Te Purutanga Mauri Pūmanawa Māori ward returned one councillor to the district council.

Candidate	Affiliation	Notes
Te Waka McLeod	None	Incumbent councillor since 2022
Peter Moeahu	None	Taranaki iwi representative and father of councillor Dinnie Moeahu

==== Kaitake-Ngāmotu general ward ====
Kaitake-Ngāmotu general ward returned six councillors to the district council.

Candidate	Affiliation	Notes
EJ Barrett	None	Disabilities advocate
Gordon Brown	Independent	Incumbent councillor since 2013, and former journalist. Ran again after initially indicating that he would not run for re-election.
Peter Buis	None	
Graham Chard	None	Incumbent chair of the Kaitake Community Board. Also ran for mayor.
Ewen Darling	None	
Damon Fox	ACT Local	Alcohol and Other Drugs (AOD) clinician
Moira Irving George	None	Former Taranaki Regional councillor
Ross Johnston	None	
Lani Mackie-Hunt	None	
Peter Marra	None	Also ran for mayor
Mullet Muzz McDowell	None	Former truck and trailor operator. Previously ran for the mayoralty in 2022.
Michael Morresey	None	Known as the "Flag Man". Chairperson of Hope Walk New Plymouth/Taranaki Charitable Trust.
Michael Paul O'Sullivan	Independent	
David Payne	None	
Adrian Sole	None	
Craig Tonkin	None	
Nikki Truman	None	
Bryan Vickery	None	Incumbent councillor, and former broadcaster
Kerry Vosseler	None	Former owner of Chaos Cafe

==== Kōhanga Moa general ward ====
Kōhanga Moa general ward returned one councillor to the district council.

Candidate	Affiliation	Notes
Jeremy Brooking	None	
Christine Fabish	None	Incumbent chairperson of the Inglewood community board
Sarah Lucas	None	Incumbent member of the Inglewood community board. Also ran for mayor.

==== North general ward ====
North general ward returned one councillor to the district council.

Candidate	Affiliation	Notes
Gina Alicia Blackburn	None	
Ian Cummings	Independent	
Dayna Brent Jury	None	
Jonathan Marshall	Independent	Incumbent chair of the Waitara community board
Jane Parker-Bishop	None	Incumbent deputy chairperson of the Waitara community board
Bill Simpson	None	Previously ran for council in 2022. Also ran for mayor.

==== At-large ward ====
Five councillors were elected at-large to the district council.

Candidate	Affiliation	Notes
Sam Bennett	Independent	Incumbent councillor. Also ran for mayor.
David Bublitz	Independent	Incumbent deputy mayor and councillor. Also ran for mayor.
Simon Chadwick	None	
Murray Chong	None	Incumbent councillor.
Shaun Clare	None	
Amanda Clinton-Gohdes	None	Incumbent councillor
Mark Coster	Independent	
Steve Francis	None	
Teresa Goodin	None	
Tina Koch	None	
Debbie Hancock	Independent	
Nigel Jones	None	
Greg Mackay	None	Also ran for mayor
Dinnie Moeahu	None	Incumbent councillor
Sarah Sutherland	None	
Wayne Williamson	None	
John Woodward	Independent	Former police officer. Also ran for mayor

== Results ==
=== Summary ===
Ward	Previous	Elected
Mayor	Neil Holdom^{R}	Max Brough
At-large ward	Sam Bennett	Murray Chong
At-large ward	Max Brough	David Bublitz
At-large ward	Amanda Clinton-Gohdes	John Woodward
At-large ward	Harry Duynhoven^{R}	Sam Bennet
At-large ward	Dinnie Moeahu	Dinnie Moeahu
Kaitake-Ngāmotu General Ward	David Bublitz	Gordon Brown
Kaitake-Ngāmotu General Ward	Gordon Brown	Graham Chard
Kaitake-Ngāmotu General Ward	Anneka Carlson Matthews^{R}	Moira Irving George
Kaitake-Ngāmotu General Ward	Murray Chong	Damon Fox
Kaitake-Ngāmotu General Ward	Bali Haque^{R}	Kerry Vosseler
Kaitake-Ngāmotu General Ward	Bryan Vickery	EJ Barrett
Te Purutanga Mauri Pūmanawa (Māori Ward)	Te Waka McLeod	Te Waka McLeod
Kōhanga Moa General Ward	Marie Pearce^{R}	Christine Fabish
North Ward	Tony Bedford^{R}	Gina Blackburn
^{R} – an incumbent who did not run for re-election

=== Mayor ===
2025 New Plymouth mayoral election
Party	Candidate	Primary votes	%	±%	Iteration	
Party	Candidate	Primary votes	%	±%	#	Votes
Independent	Max Brough	not supplied	n/a	(new)	7th	13,984
Independent	David Bublitz	not supplied	n/a	(new)	7th	6,296
Independent	Sarah Lucas	not supplied	n/a	(new)	7th	5,763
Independent	Sam Bennett	not supplied	n/a	n/a	6th	2,676
Independent	John Woodward	not supplied	n/a	(new)	5th	1,978
Independent	Graham Chard	not supplied	n/a	(new)	4th	1,496
Independent	Peter Marra	not supplied	n/a	(new)	3rd	837
Independent	Greg Mackay	not supplied	n/a	n/a	2nd	395
Independent	Bill Simpson	287	1.00	−1.05	1st	287
Quota		14,108	49.29	−0.09		
Informal votes		61	0.21	−0.27		
Blank votes		348	1.22	+0.08		
Turnout		28,625	46.46	+1.44		
Registered electors		61,607				
Independent gain from Independent on 7th iteration						

=== At-large ward ===
2025 New Plymouth District at-large ward election
Party	Candidate	Primary votes	%	±%	Iteration	
Party	Candidate	Primary votes	%	±%	#	Votes
Independent	Murray Chong	9,566	33.42	(new)	1st	9,566
Independent	David Bublitz	4,743	16.57	(new)	1st	4,743
Independent	John Woodward	not supplied	n/a	(new)	22nd	4,702
Independent	Sam Bennett^{†}	not supplied	n/a	n/a	23rd	4,183
Independent	Dinnie Moeahu^{†}	not supplied	n/a	n/a	27th	3,915
Independent	Amanda Clinton-Gohdes^{†}	not supplied	n/a	n/a	27th	3,781
Independent	Mark Coster	not supplied	n/a	(new)	21st	1,893
Independent	Simon Chadwick	not supplied	n/a	(new)	20th	1,210
Independent	Teresa Goodin	not supplied	n/a	(new)	19th	1,011
Independent	Debbie Hancock	not supplied	n/a	(new)	17th	911
Independent	Greg Mackay	not supplied	n/a	n/a	15th	850
Independent	Sarah Ruth Sutherland	not supplied	n/a	(new)	11th	762
Independent	Steve Francis	not supplied	n/a	(new)	9th	589
Independent	Shaun Clare	not supplied	n/a	n/a	8th	519
Independent	Tina Koch	not supplied	n/a	(new)	6th	374
Independent	Wayne Williamson	not supplied	n/a	(new)	5th	354
Independent	Nigel Jones	not supplied	n/a	(new)	3rd	122
Quota		4,627	16.16	+0.84		
Informal votes		329	1.15	−4.63		
Blank votes		533	1.86	−1.83		
Turnout		28,625	46.46	+1.44		
Registered electors		61,607				
Independent gain from Independent on 1st iteration						
Independent gain from Independent on 1st iteration						
Independent gain from Independent on 22nd iteration						
Independent hold on 23rd iteration						
Independent hold on 27th iteration						
^{†} incumbent

=== Kaitāke-Ngāmotu general ward ===
2025 Kaitāke-Ngāmotu general ward election
Party	Candidate	Primary votes	%	±%	Iteration	
Party	Candidate	Primary votes	%	±%	#	Votes
Independent	Gordon Travis Brown^{†}	2,832	13.96	−0.04	1st	2,832
Independent	Graham Chard	not supplied	n/a	n/a	10th	2,523
Independent	Moira Irving George	not supplied	n/a	(new)	18th	2,555
ACT Local	Damon Fox	not supplied	n/a	(new)	18th	2,480
Independent	Kerry Vosseler	not supplied	n/a	(new)	19th	2,390
Independent	EJ Barrett	not supplied	n/a	(new)	21st	2,365
Independent	Bryan Vickery^{†}	not supplied	n/a	n/a	21st	2,160
Independent	Adrian Sole	not supplied	n/a	(new)	17th	1,394
Independent	Peter Marra	not supplied	n/a	(new)	16th	779
Independent	Ewen Darling	not supplied	n/a	(new)	15th	681
Independent	Ross Johnston	not supplied	n/a	(new)	13th	634
Independent	Nikki Truman	not supplied	n/a	(new)	11th	544
Independent	Mullet Muzz McDowell	not supplied	n/a	(new)	9th	478
Independent	Pete Buis	not supplied	n/a	(new)	8th	442
Independent	Lani Mackie-Hunt	not supplied	n/a	(new)	7th	385
Independent	David Payne	not supplied	n/a	n/a	6th	341
Independent	Craig Tonkin	not supplied	n/a	(new)	5th	224
Independent	Michael Paul O'Sullivan	not supplied	n/a	n/a	4th	213
Independent	Mike Morresey	not supplied	n/a	(new)	2nd	117
Quota		2,535	12.50	−0.31		
Informal votes		1,296	6.39	+0.37		
Blank votes		1,247	6.15	+0.91		
Turnout		20,286	47.66	+0.85		
Registered electors		42,568				
Independent hold on 1st iteration						
Independent gain from Independent on 10th iteration						
Independent gain from Independent on 18th iteration						
ACT Local gain from Independent on 18th iteration						
Independent gain from Independent on 19th iteration						
Independent gain from Independent on 21st iteration						
^{†} incumbent

=== Kōhanga Moa general ward ===
2025 Kōhanga Moa geneal ward election
Party	Candidate	Primary votes	%	±%	Iteration	
Party	Candidate	Primary votes	%	±%	#	Votes
Independent	Christine Joy Fabish	not supplied	n/a	(new)	2nd	1,542
Independent	Sarah Lucas	not supplied	n/a	(new)	2nd	1,422
Independent	Jeremy Brooking	501	14.17	(new)	1st	501
Quota		1,595	45.12	n/a		
Informal votes		19	0.54	n/a		
Blank votes		327	9.25	n/a		
Turnout		3,535	48.53	n/a		
Registered electors		7,284				
Independent gain from Independent on 2nd iteration						

=== North general ward ===
2025 North general ward election
Party	Candidate	Primary votes	%	±%	Iteration	
Party	Candidate	Primary votes	%	±%	#	Votes
Independent	Gina Alicia Blackburn	not supplied	n/a	(new)	5th	1,115
Independent	Ian Cummings	not supplied	n/a	(new)	5th	918
Independent	Jonathan Marshall	not supplied	n/a	(new)	4th	719
Independent	Dayna Brent Jury	not supplied	n/a	(new)	3rd	548
Independent	Jane Elizabeth Parker-Bishop	not supplied	n/a	(new)	2nd	337
Independent	Bill Simpson	145	4.72	−7.62	1st	145
Quota		1,434	46.66	−0.10		
Informal votes		16	0.52	+0.26		
Blank votes		190	6.18	−0.04		
Turnout		3,073	43.99	−0.26		
Registered electors		6,985				
Independent gain from Independent on 5th iteration						

=== Te Purutanga Mauri Pūmanawa Māori ward ===
2025 Te Purutanga Mauri Pūmanawa Māori ward election
Party	Candidate	Primary votes	%	±%	Iteration	
Party	Candidate	Primary votes	%	±%	#	Votes
Independent	Te Waka McLeod^{†}	1,156	66.78	+2.17	1st	816
Independent	Peter Moeahu	545	31.48	(new)	1st	318
Quota		831	48.01	+3.12		
Informal votes		8	0.46	−0.73		
Blank votes		62	3.58	−5.37		
Turnout		1,731	36.29	+7.58		
Registered electors		4,770				
Independent hold on 1st iteration						
^{†} incumbent

=== Māori Ward Poll ===
Choice	Votes	%
I vote to REMOVE the Māori ward	15,004	55.47
I vote to KEEP the Māori ward	12,046	44.53
Total	27,050	100.00
Valid votes	27,050	94.50
Invalid/blank votes	1,575	5.50
Total votes	28,625	100.00
