= Chatham Islands Council =

Local government authority for the Chatham Islands in New Zealand

- Brand logo

Type
- Type: Territorial Authority of Chatham Islands
- Term limits: None

History
- Established: 1 November 1995; 30 years ago
- Preceded by: Chatham Islands County Council
- New session started: 17 October 2025

Leadership
- Mayor: Greg Horler, Ind. since 17 October 2025
- Deputy: Celine Gregory-Hunt, Ind. since 5 November 2025
- CEO: Bob Penter since March 2026

Structure
- Seats: 9 (including mayor)
- Political groups: Independent (9)
- Length of term: 3 years

Elections
- Voting system: First-past-the-post
- First election: 14 October 1995
- Last election: 11 October 2025
- Next election: 14 October 2028

Meeting place
- 13 Waitangi Tuku Road, Waitangi

Website
- cic.govt.nz

Chatham Islands Council (abbr. CIC) is the territorial authority for the Chatham Islands in New Zealand. It serves as the territory's local government. The current entity has existed since 1995, prior to which the Chatham Islands County Council was the local authority.

The governing body of the council has 8 councillors and is chaired by the mayor of Chatham Islands (currently Greg Horler since October 2025).

== History ==
=== Predecessors ===
The Chatham Islands were incorporated into the Colony of New Zealand by the British in 1842. The first local government set up in the islands was the Chatham Islands Māori Council in 1900.

Chatham Islands County was established in 1901, though the Chatham Islands County Council was not established until 1926.

=== Reform ===
Succeeding the county council, the Chatham Islands Council was established on 1 November 1995 by the Chatham Islands Council Act 1995. The council's purpose is to administer the Chatham Islands and the adjoining sea, known as the "Chatham Islands Territory".

== Governing body ==
=== Mayor ===
One mayor is elected at-large; they chair meetings of the governing body and act as the head of local government in the territory.

=== Current composition ===
The current members of the governing body of council are:

Role	Portrait	Name	Affiliation
Mayor		Greg Horler	Independent
Deputy		Celine Gregory-Hunt	Independent
Councillor		Keri Day	Independent
Councillor		Graeme Hoare	Independent
Councillor		Bridget Gibb	Independent
Councillor		Jenna Hoverd	Independent
Councillor		Jacqui Southcombe	Independent
Councillor		Nathaniel Whaitiri	Independent
Councillor		Georgia Murchie (Note: Elected in the 2026 by-election.)	Independent

== Powers, functions and services ==
In New Zealand's local government system of territorial authorities and regional councils, Chatham Islands Council is unique. Under the Local Government Act 2002, it is a district council. No separate region exists for the Chatham Islands but unlike Auckland Council, the Chatham Islands Council is not formally designated as a unitary authority. Despite this it has select responsibilities that are usually assigned to a regional council.

The Chatham Islands Council Act 1995 modifies legislation including the Resource Management Act 1991 and Building Act 2004 so that Chatham Islands Council can perform its regional council functions. The council is excluded from some regional council functions. For example, it has no responsibility for public transport under the Land Transport Management Act 2003.

Environment Canterbury carries out some regional council functions (including freshwater, biosecurity, resource management consent and compliance, navigational safety and emergency management) for the Chatham Islands under contract. In 2025, Chatham Islands Council was in negotiations with Auckland Council's council-controlled organisation Watercare for water services delivery.

Under the Chatham Islands Council Act 1995, the council can levy dues on goods entering or leaving its district. This revenue-gathering power is unique to the Chatham Islands Council.

== Chief executive ==
In December 2025, the Controller and Auditor-General of New Zealand launched an investigation into the Council's "sensitive expenditure and procurement" policies. Paul Eagle announced he would step down as council chief executive at the end of February 2026. Mayor Greg Horler had sought and obtained Eagle's resignation after obtaining a draft copy of the Auditor-General's report. In mid-March 2026, Auditor-General Grant Taylor released his report which found that previous mayor Monique Croon had allocated NZ$500,000 worth of funding from the Council's expenditure to renovate his council-owned house with new bathroom fittings, stainless steel benches, cabinets and NZ$18,000 worth of high-end Miele kitchen appliances. This funding allocation had come at a time when the cash-strapped council had been unable to fund and provide basic services.

== Elections ==
The Chatham Islands Council comprises a mayor and eight councillors, all elected at-large by a first-past-the-post system.

In February 2026, councillor Pita Thomas resigned from the council. A by-election to fill the vacancy left by Thomas was to be held from 4 May to 5 June 2026, but the council received no nominations. In June 2026, the council reopened the by-election process, taking nominations for candidates between 11 June and 9 July 2026. Five nominations were received and the by-election took place between 17 August and 18 September 2026. The by-election was won by Georgia Murchie.
