= Mayor of the Chatham Islands =

Head of local government of the Chatham Islands

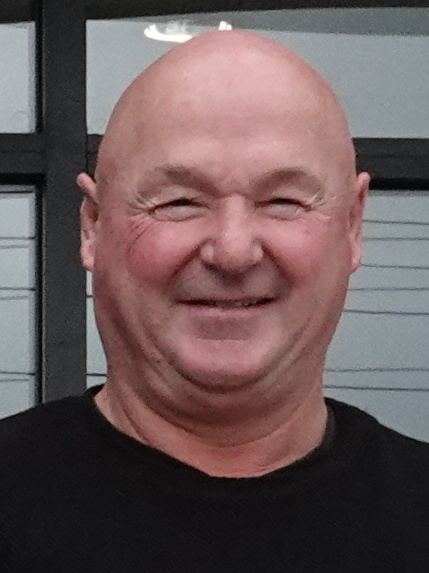
- Incumbent; Greg Horler since 2025
- Style: His Worship
- Term length: Three years
- Inaugural holder: Patrick Smith
- Formation: 1995
- Website: Official website

The Mayor of Chatham Islands is the head of the local government of the Chatham Islands, New Zealand, and presides over the Chatham Islands Council.

Patrick Smith served as mayor of the Chatham Islands from 1992 until his retirement in 2010.

Smith was succeeded by deputy mayor Alfred Preece, who acted as mayor until he was elected to the position in 2010. Preece had initially been invited to run for council by Mayor Smith. He is the son of Alfred "Bunty" Preece QSO, a former chairman of the Chatham Islands County Council. Monique Croon succeeded Preece in 2019.

Greg Horler is the current mayor of the Chatham Islands. He was first elected in the 2025 local elections.

== List of mayors ==
No.	Name	Term
1	Patrick Smith QSO	1992–2010
2	Alfred Preece	2010–2019
3	Monique Croon	2019–2025
4	Greg Horler	2025–present

== List of deputy mayors ==
Name	Term	Mayor
Joseph Thomas	1998–?	Smith
Alfred Preece	2001–2010	Smith
Jeffrey Clarke	2010–2019	Preece
Greg Horler	2019–2022	Croon
Keri Lea Day	2022–2025	Croon
Celine Gregory-Hunt	2025–present	Horler

== Mayoral elections ==
Mayoral elections take place in the Chatham Islands every 3 years, as part of the wider local elections in New Zealand. Under section 10 of the Local Electoral Act 2001, a "general election of members of every local authority or community board must be held on the second Saturday in October in every third year" from the date the Act came into effect in 2001.

=== 2001 Chatham Islands mayoral election ===
This was the first election held following the Local Electoral Act 2001. Patrick Smith won re-election, retaining the mayoralty.

=== 2004 Chatham Islands mayoral election ===
This election was held using the single transferable vote (STV) system.

Once again, Patrick Smith won re-election.

=== 2007 Chatham Islands mayoral election ===
The Chatham Islands retained the STV system used in the prior election. Patrick Smith won re-election.

=== 2010 Chatham Islands mayoral election ===
For this election, the Chatham Islands Council abolished STV and adopted first-past-the-post voting.

On 31 January 2010, Patrick Smith resigned from the mayoralty, and was immediately succeeded as acting mayor by his deputy, Alfred Preece. Preece ran for the 2010 election and retained the mayoralty on 9 October, defeating challenger Joseph Tapara.

2010 Chatham Islands mayoral election
Party	Candidate	Votes	%	±%
Independent	Alfred Preece (incumbent)	180	75.6%	N/A
Independent	Joseph Tapara	58	24.4%	N/A
Total votes		238	100%	

=== 2013 Chatham Islands mayoral election ===
Tapara unsuccessfully tried to oust Preece a second time in October 2013, only to be defeated by an even wider margin.

2013 Chatham Islands mayoral election
Party	Candidate	Votes	%	±%
Independent	Alfred Preece (incumbent)	172	85.1%	+9.5%
Independent	Joseph Tapara	30	14.9%	−9.5%
Total votes		202	100%	

=== 2016 Chatham Islands mayoral election ===
Preece won re-election.

2016 Chatham Islands mayoral election
Party	Candidate	Votes	%	±%
Independent	Alfred Preece (incumbent)	191	73.2%	−11.9%
Independent	Phillip Christiansen	57	21.8%	N/A
Independent	Noel Donaldson	13	5%	N/A
Total votes		261	100%	

=== 2019 Chatham Islands mayoral election ===
Alfred Preece did not run for the 2019 mayoral election, allowing Monique Croon to take the mayoralty.

2019 Chatham Islands mayoral election
Party	Candidate	Votes	%	±%
Independent	Monique Croon	96	32.8%	N/A
Independent	Greg Horler	86	29.6%	N/A
Independent	Jack Daymond	56	19.1%	N/A
Independent	Keri Lea Day	41	14%	N/A
Independent	Alfie Johanson	14	4.8%	N/A
Total votes		293	100%	

=== 2022 Chatham Islands mayoral election ===
Croon successfully ran for re-election. Although the election was officially non-partisan, it was analysed within the wider context of polarised public opinion regarding the Sixth Labour Government's Three Waters reform programme. Croon was one of three elected mayors to strongly support Three Waters (in contrast, 6 mayors gave it soft support, 14 were on the fence, 30 gave it soft opposition and 13 gave it strong opposition). After her election victory, Croon gave an interview on Te Ao Māori News.

2022 Chatham Islands mayoral election
Party	Candidate	Votes	%	±%
Independent	Monique Croon (incumbent)	124	51.7%	+18.9%
Independent	Greg Horler	116	48.3%	+18.7%
Total votes		240	100%	
Turnout		240	53%	

=== 2025 Chatham Islands mayoral election ===
Croon ran for re-election but was defeated by Greg Horler.

2025 Chatham Islands mayoral election
Affiliation	Candidate	Votes	%
Independent	Greg Horler	212	67.73
Independent	Monique Croon	95	30.35
Informal		0	0.00
Blank		6	1.92
Turnout		313	70.98
Registered		441	
Independent gain from Independent			
