= List of Chatham Islands Council elections =

Elections have been held every three years for the governing body of Chatham Islands Council since its inception in 1995. A number of by-elections have also occurred in that period.

== 2019 Chatham Islands Council election ==
2019 Chatham Islands Council election
- 12 October 2019
- Turnout: 293 (70.60%)
- Mayor
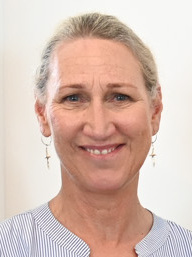

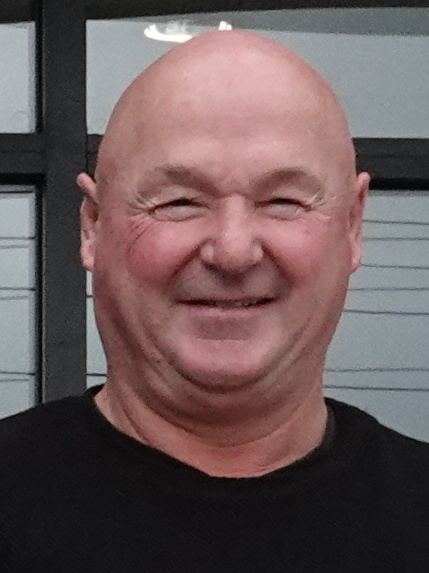
Candidate	Monique Croon	Greg Horler
Party	Independent	Independent
Popular vote	96	86
Percentage	32.76%	29.35%
Mayor before election
Alfred Preece
Independent
Elected mayor
Monique Croon
Independent
- Councillors
- 8 seats on the governing body of Chatham Islands Council; 5 seats needed for a majority
Party	Seats	+/–
Independent	8	0
This lists parties that won seats. See the complete results below.

=== 2019 Chatham Islands mayoral election ===
2019 Chatham Islands mayoral election
Party	Candidate	Votes	%	±%
Independent	Monique Croon	96	32.76	
Independent	Greg Horler	86	29.35	
Independent	Jack Daymond	56	19.11	
Independent	Keri Lea Day	41	13.99	
Independent	Alfie Johanson	14	4.78	
Informal votes		0	0.00	
Blank votes		0	0.00	
Turnout		293	70.60	
Registered electors		415		
Independent hold				
^{†} incumbent

=== 2019 council at-large ===
2019 Chatham Islands Council election
Party	Candidate	Votes	%	±%
Independent	Celine Gregory-Hunt	210	72.16	
Independent	Richard Steven Joyce^{†}	206	70.79	
Independent	Oscar Nilsson	192	65.98	
Independent	Keri Lea Day^{†}	180	61.86	
Independent	Graeme Hoare	177	60.82	
Independent	Jason Seymour^{†}	175	60.14	
Independent	Amanda Seymour	172	59.11	
Independent	Greg Horler	170	58.42	
Independent	Nigel Clancy Ryan^{†}	167	57.39	
Independent	Alfie Johanson	152	52.23	
Informal votes		0	0.00	
Blank votes		0	0.00	
Turnout		291	70.12	
Registered electors		415		
Independent gain from Independent				
Independent hold				
Independent gain from Independent				
Independent hold				
Independent gain from Independent				
Independent hold				
Independent gain from Independent				
Independent gain from Independent				
^{†} incumbent

== 2022 Chatham Islands Council election ==
2022 Chatham Islands Council election
- 8 October 2022
- Turnout: 240 (53.22%)
- Mayor
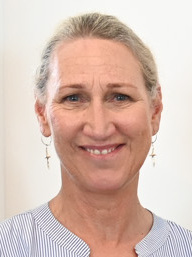

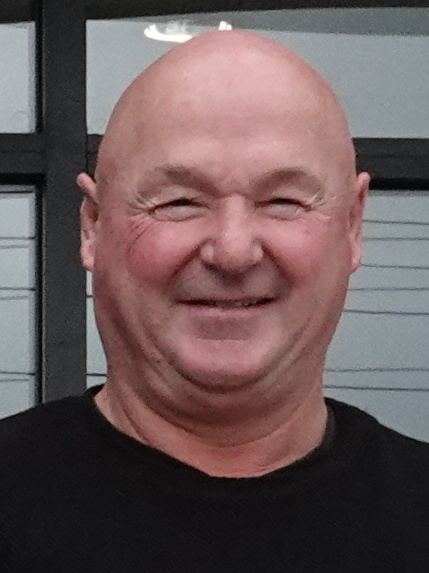
Candidate	Monique Croon	Greg Horler
Party	Independent	Independent
Popular vote	124	116
Percentage	51.67%	48.32%
Mayor before election
Monique Croon
Independent
Elected mayor
Monique Croon
Independent
- Councillors
- 8 seats on the governing body of Chatham Islands Council; 5 seats needed for a majority
Party	Seats	+/–
Independent	8	0
This lists parties that won seats. See the complete results below.

=== 2022 Chatham Islands mayoral election ===
2022 Chatham Islands mayoral election
Party	Candidate	Votes	%	±%
Independent	Monique Croon^{†}	124	51.67	
Independent	Greg Horler	116	48.33	
Informal votes		0	0.00	
Blank votes		0	0.00	
Turnout		240	53.22	
Registered electors		451		
Independent hold				
^{†} incumbent

=== 2022 council at-large ===
2022 Chatham Islands Council election
Party	Candidate	Votes	%	±%
Independent	Keri Lea Day^{†}	elected unopposed		
Independent	Celine Gregory-Hunt^{†}	elected unopposed		
Independent	Graeme Hoare^{†}	elected unopposed		
Independent	Greg Horler^{†}	elected unopposed		
Independent	Richard Joyce^{†}	elected unopposed		
Independent	Judy Kamo	elected unopposed		
Independent	Nigel Ryan	elected unopposed		
Independent	Amanda Seymour^{†}	elected unopposed		
Registered electors		451		
Independent hold				
Independent hold				
Independent hold				
Independent hold				
Independent hold				
Independent gain from Independent				
Independent gain from Independent				
Independent hold				
^{†} incumbent

== 2025 Chatham Islands Council election ==
2025 Chatham Islands Council election
- 11 October 2025
- Turnout: 316 (71.18% ▲17.95 pp)
- Mayor
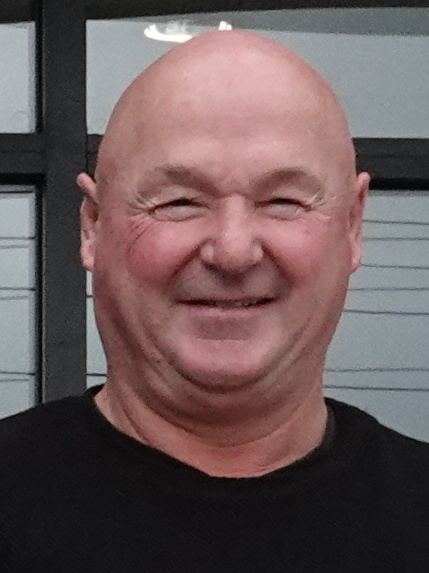

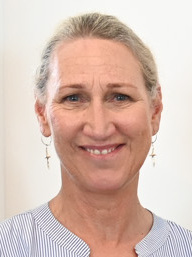
Candidate	Greg Horler	Monique Croon
Party	Independent	Independent
Popular vote	212	95
Percentage	67.09%	30.06%
Mayor before election
Monique Croon
Independent
Elected mayor
Greg Horler
Independent
- Councillors
- 8 seats on the governing body of Chatham Islands Council; 5 seats needed for a majority
Party	Seats	+/–
Independent	8	0
This lists parties that won seats. See the complete results below.
Control before	Control after
No majority	No majority

=== 2025 Chatham Islands mayoral election ===
2025 Chatham Islands mayoral election
Party	Candidate	Votes	%	±%
Independent	Greg Horler	212	67.09	+18.76
Independent	Monique Croon^{†}	95	30.06	−21.61
Informal votes		0	0.00	+0.00
Blank votes		6	1.90	+1.90
Turnout		316	71.17	+17.95
Registered electors		444		
Independent gain from Independent				
^{†} incumbent

=== 2025 council at-large ===
2025 Chatham Islands Council election
Party	Candidate	Votes	%	±%
Independent	Nathaniel Whaitiri	205	64.87	(new)
Independent	Graeme Hoare^{†}	202	63.92	n/a
Independent	Jacquie Southcombe	172	54.43	(new)
Independent	Keri Lea Day^{†}	167	52.85	n/a
Independent	Bridget Gibb	161	50.95	(new)
Independent	Celine (Bubbles) Gregory-Hunt^{†}	158	50.00	n/a
Independent	Pita Thomas	139	43.99	(new)
Independent	Jenna Hoverd (elected on lot draw)	129	40.82	(new)
Independent	Amanda Seymour^{†}	129	40.82	n/a
Independent	Jack Daymond	110	34.81	(new)
Independent	Rennae Edmonds	107	33.86	(new)
Independent	Judy Kamo^{†}	103	32.59	n/a
Independent	Loretta Lanauze	98	31.01	(new)
Independent	Trescia Lawson	63	19.94	(new)
Informal votes		3	0.95	n/a
Blank votes		1	0.32	n/a
Turnout		316	71.17	n/a
Registered electors		444		
Independent gain from Independent				
Independent hold				
Independent gain from Independent				
Independent hold				
Independent gain from Independent				
Independent hold				
Independent gain from Independent				
Independent gain from Independent				
^{†} incumbent

== 2026 Chatham Islands Council by-election ==
=== Background ===
In February 2026, councillor Pita Thomas resigned from the council. A by-election to fill the vacancy left by Thomas was to be held from 4 May to 5 June 2026, but the council received no nominations. In June 2026, the council reopened the by-election process, taking nominations for candidates between 11 June and 9 July 2026. Five nominations were received and the by-election took place between 17 August and 18 September 2026. The by-election was won by Georgia Murchie.

=== 2026 council at-large ===
2026 Chatham Islands Council by-election (Note: Turnout percentage calculated based on turnout and registered figures; source gives turnout percent excluding 4 special votes. Blank votes are listed as 0 as if there were any the election result would have said so.)
Party	Candidate	Votes	%	±%
Independent	Georgia Murchie	125	57.60	(new)
Independent	Jack Daymond	48	22.12	−13.02
Independent	Alfie Johanson	18	8.29	(new)
Independent	Loretta Lanauze	17	7.83	−23.48
Independent	Iwiroa (Wigs) Wairua	6	2.76	(new)
Informal votes		3	1.38	+0.42
Blank votes		0	0.00	−0.32
Turnout		217	48.44	−22.54
Registered electors		448		
Independent gain from Independent				
