= Results of the 2025 New Zealand territorial authority elections in the West Coast =

2025 New Zealand territorial authority elections (West Coast)
- 11 October 2025
- Turnout: 12,559 (52.37% ▲0.15 pp)
- 3 of 3 local councils
Party	Councils	+/–
No majority	3	0
This lists parties that won seats. See the complete results below.
- 3 mayors and 26 local councillors
Party	Seats	+/–
Mayors
Independent	3	0
Local councillors
Independent	26	0
This lists parties that won seats. See the complete results below.

Elections for the territorial authorities of New Zealand were held from 9 September until 11 October 2025 as part of that year's nation-wide local elections. 709 local councillors and 66 mayors were elected across 66 of 67 councils.

3 territorial authorities are located in the West Coast Region. 3 mayors and 26 district councillors were elected. 2 of 3 mayors were re-elected and no group gained or held a majority on any council.

== Maps ==

Legend
Independent hold	Independent gain

== Summary ==
=== Overall ===
Council	Electoral system	Seats	Mayor	Councillors	Control	Turnout	Details	Refs
Buller	FPP	10	▌ Independent gain	▌ Independent 10 ( 0)	▌ No majority	4,199; 55.05% ▲5.82 pp	Details	
Grey	FPP	8	▌ Independent hold	▌ Independent 8 ( 0)	▌ No majority	4,683; 47.37% ▼1.97 pp	Details	
Westland	FPP	8	▌ Independent hold	▌ Independent 8 ( 0)	▌ No majority	3,677; 56.87% ▼3.55 pp	Details	
3 of 3 councils		26						

=== Mayors ===
Council	Incumbent	Elected	Runner-up	Details	Refs
Buller	Jamie Cleine (Ind)	Chris Russell (Ind)	Jamie Cleine (Ind)	Details	
Grey	Tania Gibson (Ind)		Richard Osmaston (MFP)	Details	
Westland	Helen Lash (Ind)		Jacquie Grant (Ind)	Details	

=== Candidates ===
Party / ticket	Mayors				Councillors			
Party / ticket	2022	Candidates	Elected	+/−	2022	Candidates	Elected	+/−
Independent	3	7	3	0	26	47	26	0
Money Free	0	3	0	0	no candidates			
Seats:	3		3	0	26		26	0

== Buller District Council ==
2025 Buller District Council election
- 11 October 2025
- Turnout: 4,199 (55.05% ▲5.82 pp)
- Mayor
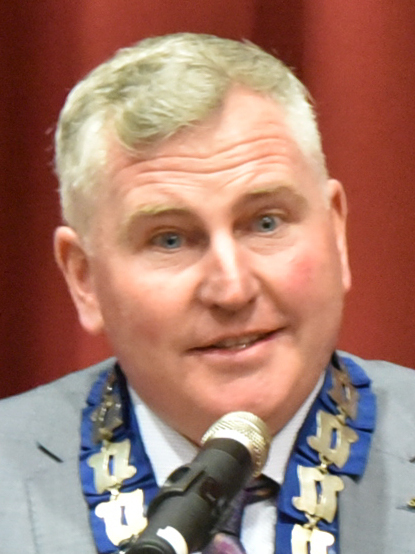
	Ind		Ind
Candidate	Chris Russell	Jamie Cleine	Linda Webb
Party	Independent	Independent	Independent
Popular vote	1,432	1,331	1,329
Percentage	34.10%	31.70%	31.65%
Mayor before election
Jamie Cleine
Independent
Elected mayor
Chris Russell
Independent
- Councillors
- 10 seats on the governing body of Buller District Council; 6 seats needed for a majority
Party	Seats	+/–
Independent	10	0
This lists parties that won seats. See the complete results below.
Control before	Control after
No majority	No majority

=== 2025 Buller mayoral election ===
2025 Buller mayoral election
Party	Candidate	Votes	%	±%
Independent	Chris Russell	1,432	34.10	(new)
Independent	Jamie Cleine ^{†}	1,331	31.70	−26.92
Independent	Linda Webb	1,329	31.65	(new)
Money Free	Richard Osmaston	45	1.07	−1.96
Informal votes		2	0.05	−0.03
Blank votes		60	1.43	−3.30
Turnout		4,199	55.05	+5.82
Registered electors		7,628		
Independent gain from Independent				
^{†} incumbent

=== Seddon ward ===
2025 Seddon ward election
Party	Candidate	Votes	%	±%
Independent	Toni O'Keefe^{†}	elected unopposed		
Independent	Rosalie Sampson^{†}	elected unopposed		
Registered electors		1,454		
Independent hold				
Independent hold				
^{†} incumbent

=== Inangahua ward ===
2025 Inangahua ward election
Party	Candidate	Votes	%	±%
Independent	Dave Hawes	elected unopposed		
Independent	Linda Webb^{†}	elected unopposed		
Registered electors		1,248		
Independent gain from Independent				
Independent hold				
^{†} incumbent

=== Westport ward ===
2025 Westport ward election
Party	Candidate	Votes	%	±%
Independent	Shayne Barry	1,460	50.28	(new)
Independent	Colin Reidy^{†}	1,176	40.50	−0.13
Independent	Philip Rutherford	1,167	40.19	(new)
Independent	Ray Curnow	1,136	39.12	(new)
Independent	Dave Hingston	1,113	38.33	(new)
Independent	Paul Reynolds	1,104	38.02	(new)
Independent	Stephanie Newburry	1,100	37.88	(new)
Independent	Nick Gear	1,029	35.43	(new)
Independent	Ross Wylde	1,005	34.61	(new)
Independent	Pat O'Dea	878	30.23	(new)
Independent	Veronica L De Friez	725	24.97	(new)
Independent	Andrew Basher^{†}	720	24.79	−20.71
Independent	Philip Grafton^{†}	717	24.69	−28.46
Independent	Andrew Beaumont	559	19.25	−14.37
Independent	Jim Hilton	517	17.80	(new)
Independent	Pauline Hamill	488	16.80	(new)
Independent	Grant Weston^{†}	484	16.67	−35.73
Informal votes		7	0.24	+0.12
Blank votes		1	0.03	−1.95
Turnout		2,904	58.95	+8.61
Registered electors		4,926		
Independent gain from Independent				
Independent hold				
Independent gain from Independent				
Independent gain from Independent				
Independent gain from Independent				
Independent gain from Independent				
^{†} incumbent

== Grey District Council ==
2025 Grey District Council election
- 11 October 2025
- Turnout: 4,683 (47.37% ▼1.97 pp)
- Mayor
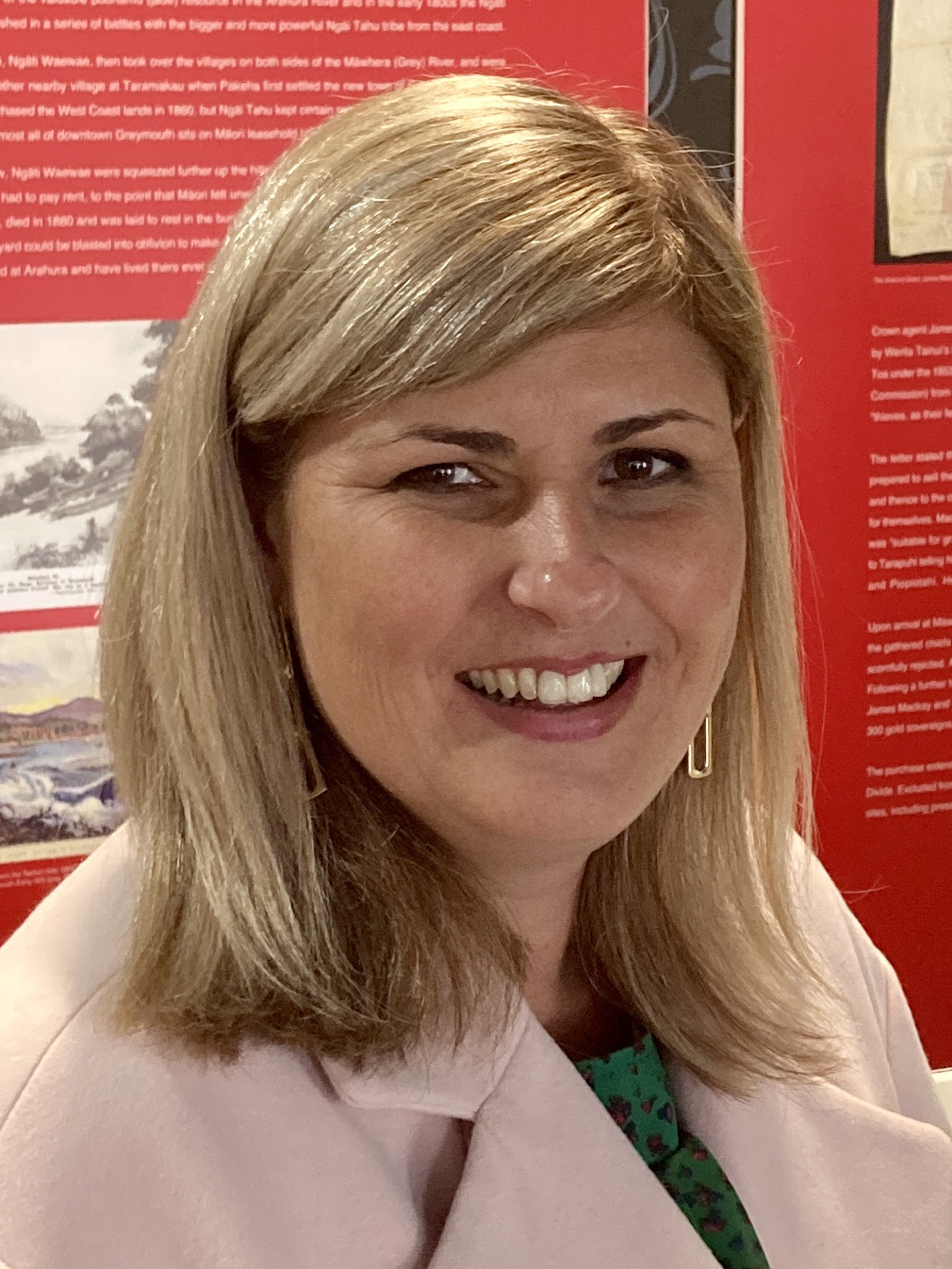

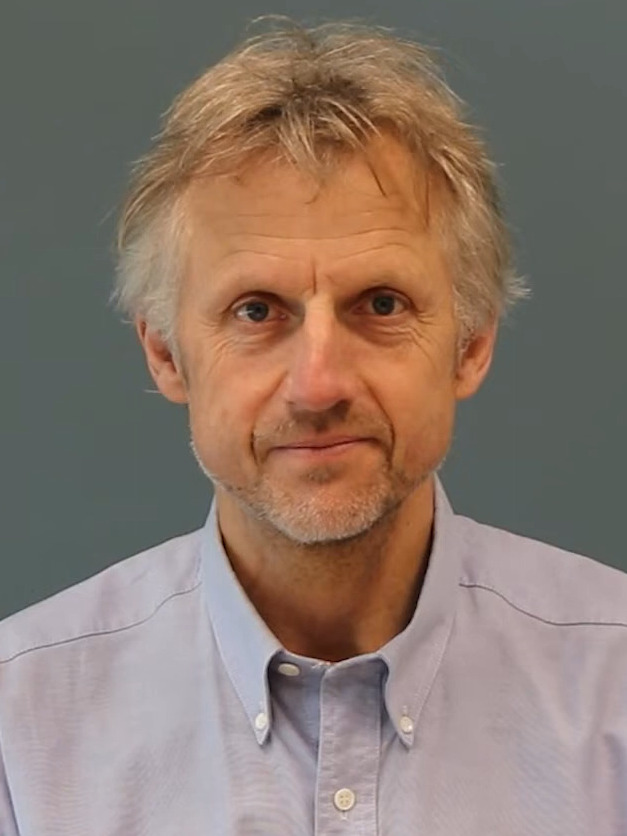
Candidate	Tania Gibson	Richard Osmaston
Party	Independent	Money Free
Popular vote	3,683	515
Percentage	78.65%	11.00%
Mayor before election
Tania Gibson
Independent
Elected mayor
Tania Gibson
Independent
- Councillors
- 8 seats on the governing body of Grey District Council; 5 seats needed for a majority
Party	Seats	+/–
Independent	8	0
This lists parties that won seats. See the complete results below.
Control before	Control after
No majority	No majority

=== 2025 Grey mayoral election ===
2025 Grey mayoral election
Party	Candidate	Votes	%	±%
Independent	Tania Gibson^{†}	3,683	78.65	−9.10
Money Free	Richard Osmaston	515	11.00	+3.65
Informal votes		9	0.19	+0.11
Blank votes		475	10.14	+5.44
Turnout		4,683	47.37	−1.97
Registered electors		9,886		
Independent hold				
^{†} incumbent

=== Northern ward (Grey) ===
2025 Northern ward election
Party	Candidate	Votes	%	±%
Independent	Kate Kennedy^{†}	elected unopposed		
Registered electors		1,189		
Independent hold				
^{†} incumbent

=== Central ward ===
2025 Central ward election
Party	Candidate	Votes	%	±%
Independent	Peter Brent Davy^{†}	982	63.89	(new)
Independent	Timothy Mora^{†}	890	57.91	−17.50
Independent	Jack O'Connor^{†}	770	50.10	−11.14
Independent	Kaia Beal	616	40.08	(new)
Independent	Ritchie Mathieson	427	27.78	(new)
Informal votes		2	0.13	+0.07
Blank votes		45	2.93	+1.29
Turnout		1,537	44.10	−2.49
Registered electors		3,485		
Independent gain from Independent				
Independent hold				
Independent hold				
^{†} incumbent

=== Southern ward (Grey) ===
2025 Southern ward election
Party	Candidate	Votes	%	±%
Independent	Paulette Birchfield	904	58.14	(new)
Independent	Rex MacDonald^{†}	746	47.97	−32.06
Independent	Terry Donaldson	711	45.72	(new)
Independent	John Canning^{†}	393	25.27	−22.56
Informal votes		1	0.06	+0.06
Blank votes		36	2.32	−0.46
Turnout		1,555	55.46	−0.25
Registered electors		2,804		
Independent gain from Independent				
Independent hold				
^{†} incumbent

=== Eastern ward ===
2025 Eastern ward election
Party	Candidate	Votes	%	±%
Independent	Pesty Gibson^{†}	elected unopposed		
Independent	Robert Mallinson^{†}	elected unopposed		
Registered electors		2,408		
Independent hold				
Independent hold				
^{†} incumbent

== Westland District Council ==
2025 Westland District Council election
- 11 October 2025
- Turnout: 3,677 (56.87% ▼3.55 pp)
- Mayor
	Ind	Ind	Ind
Candidate	Helen Lash	Jacquie Grant	Logan Courtney
Party	Independent	Independent	Independent
Popular vote	1,609	1,601	360
Percentage	43.76%	43.54%	9.79%
Mayor before election
Helen Lash
Independent
Elected mayor
Helen Lash
Independent
- Councillors
- 8 seats on the governing body of Westland District Council; 5 seats needed for a majority
Party	Seats	+/–
Independent	8	0
This lists parties that won seats. See the complete results below.
Control before	Control after
No majority	No majority

=== 2025 Westland mayoral election ===
2025 Westland mayoral election
Party	Candidate	Votes	%	±%
Independent	Helen Lash^{†}	1,609	43.76	+12.81
Independent	Jacquie Grant	1,601	43.54	(new)
Independent	Logan Courtney	360	9.79	(new)
Money Free	Richard Osmaston	33	0.90	+0.48
Informal votes		2	0.05	−0.05
Blank votes		72	1.96	+1.02
Turnout		3,677	56.87	−3.55
Registered electors		6,466		
Independent hold				
^{†} incumbent

=== Northern ward (Westland) ===
2025 Northern ward election
Party	Candidate	Votes	%	±%
Independent	Reilly Burden^{†}	974	62.48	+1.78
Independent	Greg Maitland	749	48.04	(new)
Independent	Euan Mackenzie	682	43.75	(new)
Independent	Jane Neale^{†}	610	39.13	−11.74
Independent	Lez Morgan	519	33.29	(new)
Informal votes		1	0.06	+0.06
Blank votes		40	2.57	−0.73
Turnout		1,559	57.74	−4.30
Registered electors		2,700		
Independent hold				
Independent gain from Independent				
Independent gain from Independent				
^{†} incumbent

=== Hokitika ward ===
2025 Hokitika ward election
Party	Candidate	Votes	%	±%
Independent	Carol Martin	822	52.69	(new)
Independent	Joseph Walker	776	49.74	(new)
Independent	Steven Gillett^{†}	712	45.64	−3.08
Independent	Donna Baird^{†}	594	38.08	−9.67
Independent	Phil Barker	523	33.53	(new)
Independent	Flow In	361	23.14	(new)
Independent	Martin Bolland	261	16.73	(new)
Informal votes		1	0.06	+0.06
Blank votes		22	1.41	+0.13
Turnout		1,560	59.82	−3.48
Registered electors		2,608		
Independent gain from Independent				
Independent gain from Independent				
Independent hold				
^{†} incumbent

=== Southern ward (Westland) ===
2025 Southern ward election
Party	Candidate	Votes	%	±%
Independent	Brian Manera^{†}	elected unopposed		
Independent	Janella Munns	elected unopposed		
Registered electors		1,158		
Independent hold				
Independent gain from Independent				
^{†} incumbent

== See also ==
- 2025 West Coast Regional Council election
