= 1942 Auckland Rugby League season =

The 1942 Auckland Rugby League season was its 34th. The season was extremely hampered by World War II with so many men away at war. The Auckland Rugby League reduced the number of teams in the senior grade from 9 to 6, and there were few reserve grade matches and no senior B competition what so ever. Many clubs were forced to focus on their junior teams and schoolboy sides.

The Fox Memorial Shield was won by Manukau for the second time in its history following its first title in 1936. They finished with a 13 win, 2 loss record, comfortably ahead of the amalgamated City-Otahuhu side in second place with a 10 win, 5 loss record. The City-Otahuhu side had won all 5 of their first round matches to win the Rukutai Shield. The Roope Rooster was won by Richmond Rovers who beat the amalgamated Marist-North Shore side 13-6 in the final. This was the 7th time Richmond had won the Roope Rooster trophy. A week later the Stormont Shield was won by Manukau who defeated Richmond 11 to 5.

The J. F. W. Dickson medal for a senior player went to Owen Hughes of the City-Otahuhu club who was adjudged the most sportsmanlike player in the code for the season, while the junior medal was awarded to Arnold Jones of the Glenora club. They were presented at the board meeting on September 23. The following week the veteran player Lindsay Simons of the North Shore club was also presented with a medal.

There were only three representative matches played. On July 11 Auckland hosted South Auckland (northern Waikato) at Carlaw Park and won 49 to 16. Then on August 29 Auckland Māori (Tamaki) beat Auckland Pākēha 10 points to 8. The same two teams met again on September 28, this time a 23-all draw was the result. The year was also marked by the deaths of several players while at war.

Preceded by 1941	34th Auckland Rugby League season 1942	Succeeded by 1943

== Auckland Rugby League News ==
=== ARL Chairman nomination ===
On March 6 the trustees of Carlaw Park announced that Mr. J. W. Watson, J.P., had been nominated for the chairmanship of the Auckland Rugby League control board to succeed Mr. G. Grey Campbell, who was not available for re-election due to “business and health reasons and was retiring from the position after nine years. Watson was the manager and director of Heards Limited and had been a “keen supporter of rugby league for many years”. He had been “actively associated with the Manukau club and of late years has been a member of the New Zealand Rugby League Council, representing Wellington [Rugby] League”. Mr. Grey Campbell was nominated by Mr. John A. Lee to succeed him as president as he was retiring from the position.

=== Annual report ===
On March 23 the Auckland Rugby League released its annual report. It showed that despite the “overshadowing effect of the war, it was able at the end of the season to show a profit of £309”. There had been a “consensus of opinion of the leaders of governments and military authorities... that recreational sport such as football should be carried on”. It was said that the “war made serious inroads among the players, while in other directions rugby league played its part in the war effort in New Zealand. Since the commencement of the war Carlaw Park has, without cost, been placed at the disposal of many essential units engaged in war activities”. The accounts showed that the main source of revenue, which was from gate receipts had dropped from £4486 in 1940 to £3923 in 1941 which was a drop of £563. However the working account only showed a reduction of £271. In terms of referees it was noted that over 10 percent of referees had enlisted, and many others were engaged in war production work and therefore unable to work on Saturdays. This had meant that on many occasions some members had had to referee two or three matches on a single day.

=== Annual meeting ===
The 32nd annual meeting was scheduled for March 25 at the Auckland Rugby League rooms in the Grey Buildings in Courthouse Lane on Wednesday at 7:45 pm. President John A. Lee spoke at the meeting and said that it was “apparent that the war had made inroads, not only into the administration of the game, but also to the clubs, which had lost the services of many good players. “You have a duty to perform in carrying on the game and in providing competition for all who remain”.

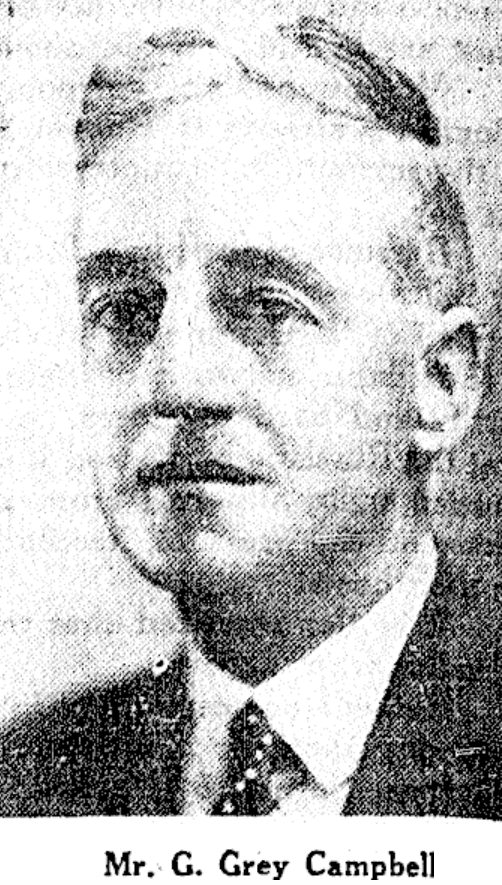

He also paid tribute to the retiring chairman Mr. G. Grey Campbell. Campbell said that “he had spent nine happy years as chairman and he was now handing over the reins of office at a difficult time. However, he was assured of the assistance of a very loyal crew of officials. He thanked Messrs. I. Culpan (secretary) and J. E. Knowling (treasurer) for their loyal support. Mr. J. W. Watson was welcomed as the newly appointed chairman. The following officials were elected: Patron, Mr. J. B. Donald; president, Mr. G. Grey Campbell; vice-patrons, Messrs. J. F. W. Dickson, J. A. Lee, M.P.; chairman, Mr. J. W. Watson; deputy-chairman, Mr. E. J. Phelan; auditors, Messrs. Garrard and Bennett; hon. solicitor, Mr. H. M. Rogerson; secretary, Mr. I Culpan; treasurer, Mr. Mr J. E. Knowling, Mr. R. Doble; management committee, Messrs. J. W. Probert, E. Chapman, Jim Clark, V. Rose, T. Wilson. T. Davis, William Mincham, and R. Doble.

On April 16 a “Presentation Social Night” was held to honour the retired chairman, Mr. G. Grey Campbell at Lewis Eady Hall on Queen Street. Chairman Mr. J. W. Watson presided over the evening and the main presentation of a silver tea service was given by Mr. E. J. Phelan, the deputy chairman. Phelan “related many instances of the business sagacity of” Campbell, “who had put into the management of the code all his powers ad talents”. During the evening other presentations were made to Campbell, including the Junior Board (secretary's satchel), schoolboys (dinner service), ladies (barometer), referees (clock), and senior clubs (two fireside chairs). The chairman of the Auckland Rugby Union, Mr. A. A. Baker said “I would like to pay a high tribute to the sportsmanship of Mr. Campbell... it had been a pleasure to have worked with him in the interests of sport generally”., while Mr. F. Baker, chairman of the Auckland Football Association, said his “common sense had made for harmonious relations among the winter sportsmen”. Campbell in his reply thanks Ivan Culpan, and Mr. J. E. Rowling for their help and also his wife for her support.

=== Senior competition amalgamations and protest ===
At the April 8 meeting of the board of control it was announced that nine teams had been nominated for the senior grade competition however a decision was not made immediately as to whether all the teams would be accepted without learning more about their relative strength first. Mr. R. Doble said that it was originally intended to limit the senior championship to seven clubs, with a preference for six well-balanced teams. It was decided to defer the draw until the following Wednesday (April 15).

A deputation from an army unit regarding the entry of a team in the senior grade was heard. They said that a number of prominent players would be available each Saturday, but several of them were registered with local clubs. Chairman Watson said transfers to the Army team from local clubs would not be favourably considered.

At the April 15 board meeting it was decided to omit the Manukau club from the senior grade, and also not accept the nomination from a military team from the motor transport pool. The Motor Transport Pool team later decided to enter a team to play rugby union. They would ultimately win the Gallaher Shield (the ARU senior club rugby competition) later in the year. Otahuhu Rovers however did have their nomination accepted as they had sent in a list of 25 players, most of whom were engaged in essential trades. Mr. William Mincham expressed disappointment at the “laxity of the clubs in submitting the personnel of teams. He said every support had been given to club secretaries but it was apparent that the full strength of clubs was not known”. The board would look at the teams on the field in a preliminary round on April 18 to see their strength and then decide on the final sides to begin the championship proper.

Following the preliminary games on April 18 the ARL control board met in the evening and decided to merge several senior sides “so that the identity of the clubs will not be lost during wartime competition”. The clubs who would merge were North Shore and Marist, Newton and Mount Albert, City and Otahuhu, while Manukau, Richmond, and Ponsonby would remain as stand alone senior sides. It was remarked that the Mount Albert club did not approve of joining up with the Newton club. In fact prior to their first combined match the Mount Albert club published a notice in the Auckland Star that stated “patrons and members of the Mt. Albert Rugby League Club kindly note that the Mt Albert-Newton team is in no way connected with the well-known Mt Albert Rugby League Football Club which plays under the blue and gold colours”.

Prior to the start of the season the Otahuhu club received a letter from the military authorities that said “we cannot let men off for sport if it is not their weekend free. It would not be fair to my officers and men if special leave were granted for football”. The Auckland Rugby League considered the letter at their weekly meeting on April 30 and they had two other similar letters from the camps at Papakura and Avondale.

The second week of preliminary matches was something of a mess when neither the North Shore nor Mount Albert clubs contributed any players to their amalgamated sides leaving Newton and Marist to play as themselves. While in the City-Otahuhu combined side both clubs fielded their own team for a half each. Following the weekend the ARL board met to review the amalgamation scheme. Chairman Watson said “he had met members of the two clubs concerned, and thought that the prospect of the dissenting clubs (North Shore and Mount Albert) as at present constituted, coming into the scheme most remote”. Mr. E. J. Phelan “urged that cooperation was desired”. On May 13 the ARL received a letter from the Mount Albert club asking them to reconsider the amalgamation scheme. The board decided to replay that the decision could not be changed. It was decided to run the senior competition for three rounds with the board holding the right to curtail the season if it was necessary.

In June after the 6th round of matches North Shore Albions called a special meeting and eventually decided to confirm their amalgamation. Until that time none of their players had taken part in any matches played by the side. Negotiations were carried out by Messrs. Joe Sayegh (president), and Jack Kirwan (secretary) who represented the Marist club, while Messrs. Horace H. Hunt, and J. Mann represented the North Shore club. It was then reported that six North Shore players would be available for the following Saturday. Chairman of the ARL, Mr. Watson said that the North Shore club had agreed to the scheme for the duration of the war.

=== Availability of senior players in military camps ===
Despite requests early in the season for senior league players to be made available for Saturday games the league was repeatedly told that this would not be possible. Then during the season the Otahuhu club requested leave for one of their players but the commanding officer of the camp said "I regret I am unable to allow any men extra leave for sport other than for Rugby Union and hockey teams on Saturdays". Upon seeing the letter at the board meeting on June 24 chairman Mr. J. W. Watson, "thought the time had arrived when strong action should be taken on this question of the feeling in some military quarters against the league code. He realised that any complaint might be visited upon the player concerned, but action should be taken in view of the Minister of Defence, Mr. Fred Jones, that no bias would be shown towards league players and that leave would be granted to them equally with any other game of football". Members spoke strongly on the issue and it was decided to communicate directly with the Minister of Defence immediately.

=== Refusal for league team to travel ===
In August a trip to Wellington by the Manukau league side to play a Wellington was not allowed by the railway authorities, however one by a rugby union team was allowed. Chairman Watson “went on to detail efforts made in trying to overcome this alleged affront to rugby league. He had interviewed railway officials at Auckland who admitted that permission had been granted for an Auckland Rugby Union team to go to Wellington for a football match, while a similar application for a league team had been refused. They said they could not give any reason for this discrimination, and were instructed by Wellington not to give any reason”. Chairman Watson “concluded that protests had been forwarded to prominent members of Parliament and of the War Cabinet”. A week later a telegram was received at the meeting of the board of control on September 2 from the Minister of Railways, Mr. Bob Semple, “stating that permission had been granted for the Māori league team [Manukau] to visit Wellington on September 12 for the purpose of playing a match on [the] Basin Reserve”. Chairman Watson said that “the question of the application had been placed before the acting Prime Minister, the Hon. Daniel Giles Sullivan, and all connected with the code would be pleased with the amended decision”.

=== Richmond v M.T.P. proposed match ===
On October 6 it was reported that Chairman Watson had stated that “at the request of Military Transport Pool (winner of the Gallagher Shield, Auckland rugby's chief club trophy) a match has been arranged for next Saturday at Carlaw Park against Richmond (holder of the Roope Rooster)”. The gate was said to be divided between the M.T.P. regimental fund, the St. John Ambulance and the Auckland Rugby League. The match would be clashing with the rugby match between Auckland and the Third New Zealand Division military side. The ARL even began to advertise the match in the newspapers despite no assurances from the ARU that the match would be permitted on their part. The president of the M.T.P. Rugby Football Club, Captain J. Todd was surprised by the advertisements and “he declared that the match had been definitely cancelled last Monday. You can take it from me that the M.T.P. team cannot play”. He went on to say “owing to unforeseen circumstances he had considered that it was not possible for his club team to take part in the match. For that reason he had communicated to the chairman of the Auckland Rugby League last Monday the fact that the M.T.P. team would not be available this Saturday. The following day it was reported that “as far as the league is concerned the match between M.T.P. and Richmond is definitely on, not withstanding Captain Todd's statement, said Chairman Watson. He went on to say “I would like to point out that M.T.P. men are rugby league players. “We know” added Mr Watson that the team is still anxious to play this game”. Five of the M.T.P. team had been selected for the Auckland representative side in their match. Watson said “it is important to bear in mind that this is an Auckland Rugby Union representative team and not a military team. We know of no authority that any military officer has empowering him to determine the code of football soldiers under his command should play when away from military duties... as members of the M.T.P. team have been available to play rugby union football every Saturday of the past season we can only presume that there should be no military duties to interfere with the personnel of the team playing the game they desire on any one particular Saturday”. On October 7 at the ARL board meeting it was decided that the match would most likely be cancelled and that a final decision would be made on the 8th. It was announced later in the afternoon that the match would no longer be able to proceed.

Just days later a match was advertised to be played at Western Springs between a side named “All Golds” and Auckland Māori. The side listed for the All Golds featured a large number of rugby league players who had spent the season in the M.T.P. side so it appears to be an effort on their part to arrange their own match. The match was being provided by the NZ RL Old Boys’ Association which had been established a year prior. The Auckland Rugby League stated in an advertisement that the match was not under their jurisdiction, “nor has it our authority”.

=== Reserve grade competition ===
Due to the low numbers of senior players the competition did not begin and a decision on it running at all was deferred until following the 2nd round of senior matches. Ultimately there was no proper reserve grade competition though some reserve grade sides played matches during the season.

=== Carlaw Park ===
Carlaw Park continued, as it had done in previous years to be used by the military for training purposes. It was used on January 18 by the Auckland City Battalion for an all day parade. During the offseason the lease of the ground had been secured for a further 21 years. At the board of control meeting on April 8 it was stated that “satisfactory arrangements were being made for the erection of suitable dispersal gates for the speedy release of patrons at Carlaw Park in the event of an emergency”. It was decided to make entry for Carlaw Park matches sixpence for soldiers and visiting men of Allied nations. Returned soldiers would be admitted for free. The ordinary entry fee was 1 shilling for the ground, sixpence for ladies and sixpence for the grandstand. At the May 27 board meeting the room rearrangement underneath the Carlaw Park grandstand was discussed as the board had given 3 of them to the E.P.S. fire service. At the board meeting on July 29 Mr. W. Foreshaw was presented with a wallet and a cheque to thank him for being in charge of the players’ gate at Carlaw Park for 21 years as a volunteer. Chairman Watson said “the great success of the code had been due to the services rendered by men of the stamp of Foreshaw”.

=== War effort contributions ===
At the board meeting on May 27 Mr. J. W. Probert said that “the time has arrived for the people to do all they can for the Liberty Loan”. He said “that though the league had given the Home Guard the use of Carlaw Park and the Fire Section of the E.P.S. the free use of rooms under the grandstand, the league could still do more in this time of national stress. The need was urgent and he proposed that the board take up £100 in the loan”. Chairman Mr. J. W. Watson “was in full agreement with the proposal, to which the board agreed”. Days later the Reserve Bank recorded that it had received £100 for the Liberty Loan from the Auckland Rugby League.

=== Old timers’ passes ===
It was decided on April 22 that former senior players would be given senior match passes for the season based on how many senior games they had played. For 50 matches they would receive a one season pass; 60, two seasons; 70, three seasons; and so on up to 100 games with a limit of a six years’ pass to any player.

=== Life membership ===
A subcommittee met at the board meeting on June 11 to discuss the criteria for life membership. The committee was chaired by Mr. G Grey Campbell (the retired board chairman). Their recommendations “included that the honour, character and standing of the recipient must be taken into account; that the League should have the right of recalling the honour if the recipient brought dishonour upon the code, and that life membership only be granted on a four-fifths majority of the board”. The recommendations of the subcommittee were all approved.

==== Thomas (Scotty) McClymont ====
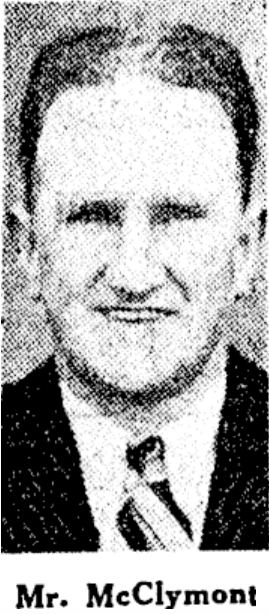

On April 1 Thomas McClymont was nominated by the Richmond Rovers club for life membership of Auckland Rugby League and it was agreed to. He had played 100 matches for the Ponsonby United seniors from 1913 to 1924, along with 17 appearances for Auckland (1919–22), and 16 for New Zealand (1919–24). He had also coached Richmond Rovers for several seasons in the mid 1930s as well as coaching Auckland and New Zealand. In 2007 he was inducted into the New Zealand Legend of League. Messrs R. Doble and T. Davis supported the recommendation and “both drew attention to the long and faithful service Mr. McClymont had given to the code, “As a selector, player, and advisor”, said Mr. Doble, “he has proved an outstanding personality in the code”.

==== Mr. George Chapman ====
On May 6 life membership was granted to Mr. George Chapman of Ellerslie in recognition of 30 years service to the code. His nomination was by the junior control board.

=== Auckland representative side ===
At the May 13 board of control meeting Mr. A. J. (Dougie) McGregor, Bill Cloke, and Stan Prentice were appointed Auckland selectors for the season. All three were past Auckland club, representative, and New Zealand team players.

=== Obituaries ===
==== Laurence Douglas Mills ====
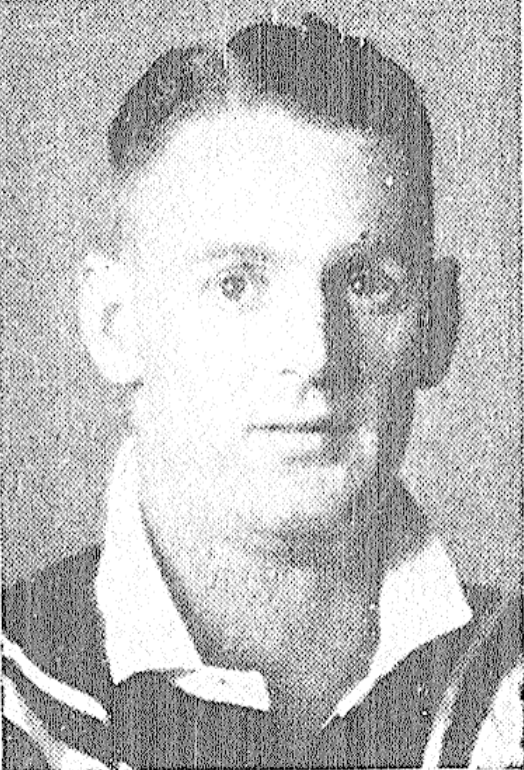

It was reported in mid January that Private Laurence Douglas Mills had been killed in the Western Desert campaign of North Africa on December 1, 1941. Mills was the son of Ephraim and Irene Winifrede Mills of Grey Lynn. He had been a Richmond schoolboy player and moved through the various grades until debuting for the senior side in 1938. He played for Richmond seniors from 1938 to 1940, scoring 26 tries. He also represented Auckland Pākehā in 1940, and was selected for the aborted New Zealand tour of England and Wales in 1939 at the age of just 20. He had been educated at Mount Albert Grammar School and departed with the Third Echelon. His only brother, Ray, had departed with an earlier draft. He was memorialised at El Alamein War Cemetery in Egypt.

==== Malcolm Vernon Cato ====
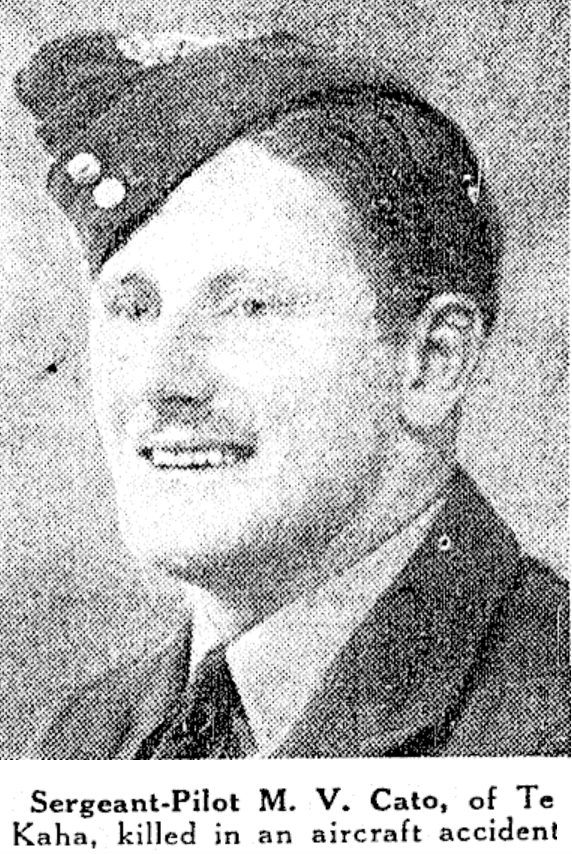

In early August it was reported that Malcolm (Mal) Vernon Cato had been killed in an aircraft accident while serving on July 16. He was 25 years of age at the time of his death. Cato had been “educated at the Te Kaha School, where his father was native schoolmaster, and then at Mount Albert Grammar School." He belonged to the North Shore Rugby Club and also played senior rugby league for Mount Albert after joining them in late 1939 and playing the 1940 season and the early part of 1941 before his departure overseas. Cato was "a keen student of the Māori language... and very popular among Māoris in the Te Kaha district. When news of his death was received, a tangi was held in his memory". The Mount Albert senior players wore armbands as a mark of respect for their match on August 1 with Ponsonby. The Mount Albert senior players wore armbands as a mark of respect for their match on August 1 with Ponsonby. At the board meeting on August 5 a “motion of sympathy was carried in silence with” his relatives. Cato was buried at Beck Row (St John's) Churchyard, Mildenhall, Suffolk, England.

== Fox Memorial Shield (senior grade championship) ==
=== Preliminary rounds ===
After the first round the Auckland Rugby League looked to enforce their amalgamation decision however both North Shore and Mount Albert refused to join with Marist and Newton respectively therefore those sides played as themselves. City and Otahuhu did play 'together' however they played one half each in their match with Ponsonby. There was no scoring provided for any of the matches aside from a mention that B Sullings scored a try in Richmond's round 1 win over Ponsonby, and E Cowley scored 2 tries in Newtons round 2 win over Marist. Later in the season it was also mentioned that Tommy Chase had scored 102 points to that point in the season and as he had only scored 92 points in the Fox Memorial matches it is implied that he kicked 5 goals in the preliminary matches. The first round saw a number of players on weekend leave.

=== Round 1 ===
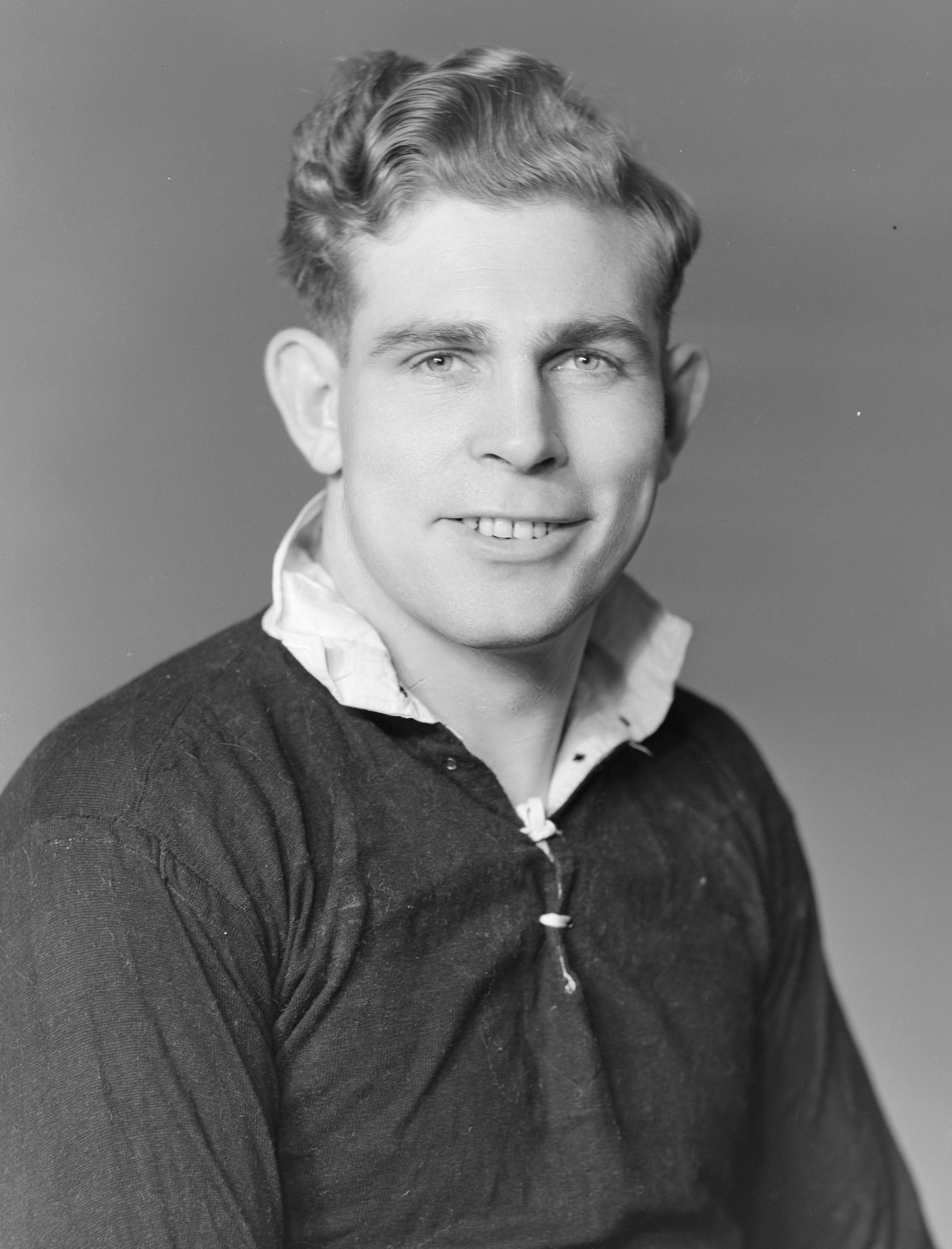
Johnny Simpson the Marist forward.

There was very little coverage of the scoring details in the preliminary round. Bob Sullings, a 32 year old right winger who had played in New South Wales scored a try for Richmond after moving to Auckland a year prior. He was a police officer. Johnny Simpson scored two tries in the forwards for Marist and was outstanding.

18 April	Richmond	7-5	Ponsonby	Carlaw Park 1
3:00	Try: Bob Sullings; Con: Unknown; Pen: Unknown		Try: Unknown; Con: Unknown	Referee: George Kelly

18 April	Mount Albert	22-5	Newton	Carlaw Park 1
1:45	Try: Unknown 22 pts		Try: Unknown 5 pts	Referee: Emmet Pope

18 April	City	10-10	Otahuhu	Carlaw Park 2
3:00	Try: Unknown 10 pts		Try: Unknown 10 pts	Referee: J O'Shannessey

18 April	North Shore	24-13	Marist	Carlaw Park 2
1:45	Try: Unknown 24 pts		Try: Johnny Simpson 2, Unknown; Con: Unknown 2	Referee: A Pearson

	Date		Score		Score	Referee	Venue
Round 2	2 May	Manukau	25	Richmond	8	George Kelly	Carlaw Park 1, 3:00
-	2 May	City-Otahuhu	8	Ponsonby	7	A Pearson	Carlaw Park 1, 1:45
-	2 May	Newton	36	Marist	16	Stuart Billman	Carlaw Park 2, 3:00

=== Fox Memorial standings ===
Team	Pld	W	D	L	F	A	Pts
Manukau	15	13	0	2	283	110	26
City-Otahuhu	15	10	0	5	247	133	20
Ponsonby United	15	7	0	8	120	210	14
Newton-Mount Albert	15	6	0	9	160	208	12
Richmond Rovers	15	5	0	10	148	186	10
Marist-North Shore	15	4	0	11	126	237	8

=== Fox Memorial results ===
==== Round 1 ====
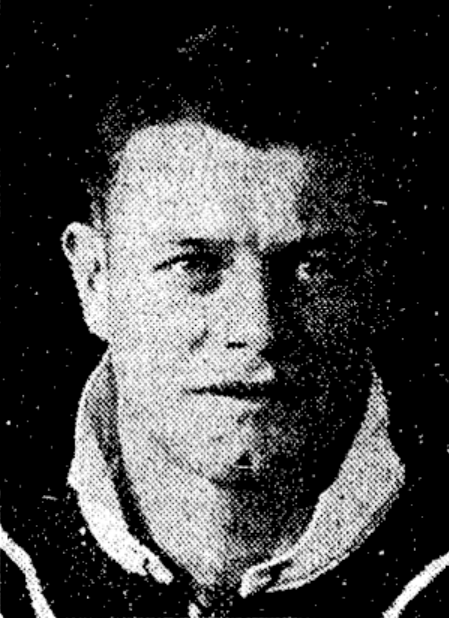
Jack Satherley returned from retirement for Richmond. He had represented New Zealand in 1937 and 1938.

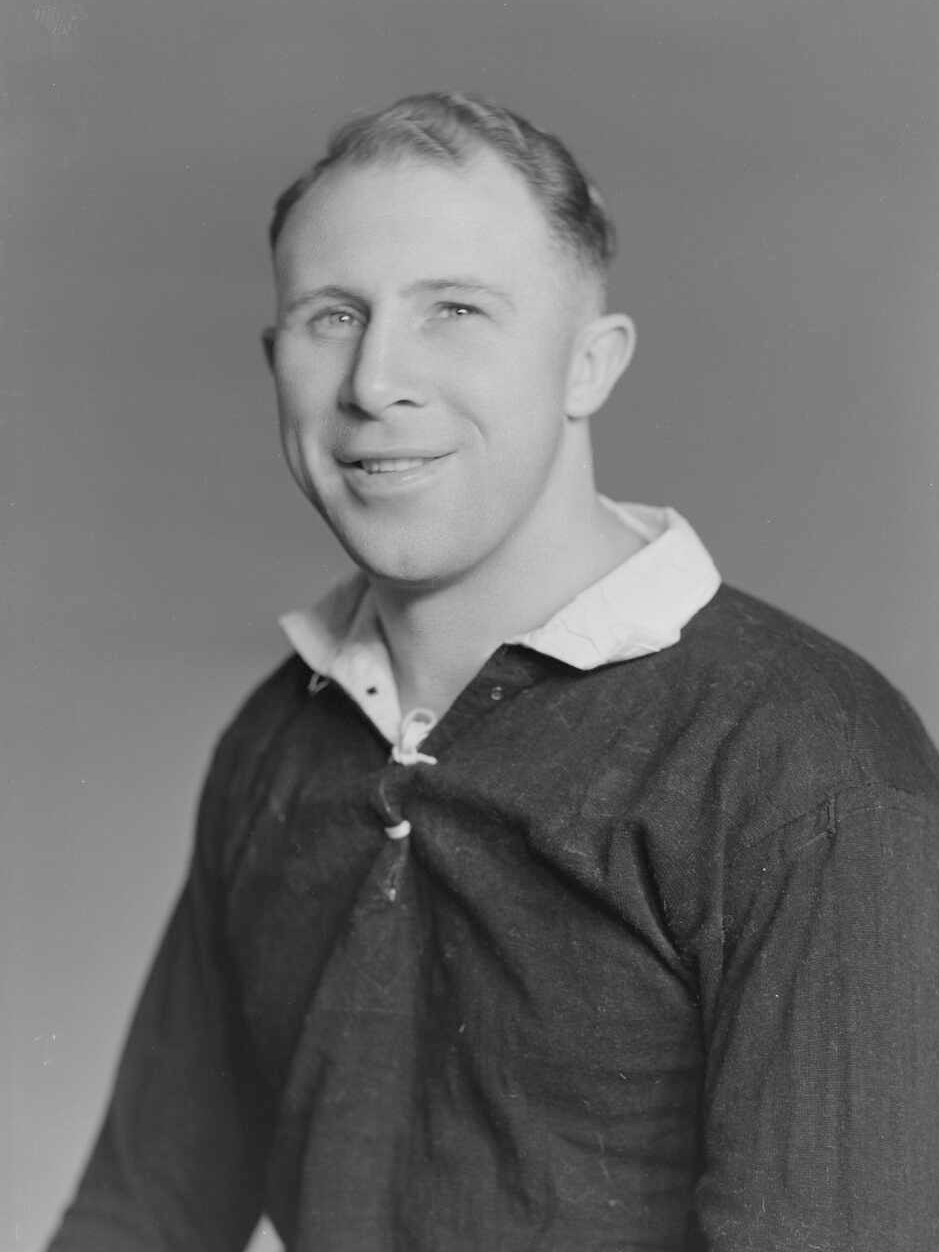
Bob Scott

In the match between Ponsonby and Newton-Mt Albert the referee, H. Tate was injured after becoming “involved in a forward struggle during the last few minutes and injured his leg”. He had to be taken to Auckland Hospital. Ponsonby beat the combined Newton-Mount Albert side 15-6 with W Briggs, their forward scoring a try and kicking a conversion and a penalty while fullback Bob Scott scored a try and kicked a conversion. The Newton-Mount Albert side was hampered in the backs when their good centre three-quarter, Colin Cowley had to leave the field with an injury early in the game. In the City-Otahuhu v Manukau game the combined teams forwards were outstanding and Peter McManus at centre three-quarter repeatedly broke through in the backs. Ray Halsey was their other stand out back on the field and scored two tries. Hawea Mataira (City-Otahuhu) was the outstanding forward on the field. Jack Satherley came out of retirement, not having played for Richmond since 1939 and remarkably scored 3 tries from the hooker position.

9 May	City-Otahuhu	10-7	Manukau	Carlaw Park 1
3:00	Try: Ray Halsey 2 Pen: Jimmy Mullins, Alan Donovan		Try: W Butler; Pen: Tommy Chase 2	Referee: Stuart Billman

9 May	Ponsonby	15-6	Newton-Mt Albert	Carlaw Park 1
1:45	Try: Carr, Bob Scott, W Briggs; Con: W Briggs, Bob Scott; Pen: W Briggs		Pen: Roy Niwa 3	Referee: H Tate

9 May	Richmond	22-10	Marist-North Shore	Carlaw Park 2
3:00	Try: Jack Satherley 3, William Kinney 2, Ron McGregor; Con: Charles Webb 2		Try: Don McLeod, Gerry Hughes; Con: Cyril Wiberg; Pen: Cyril Wiberg	Referee: George Kelly

==== Round 2 ====
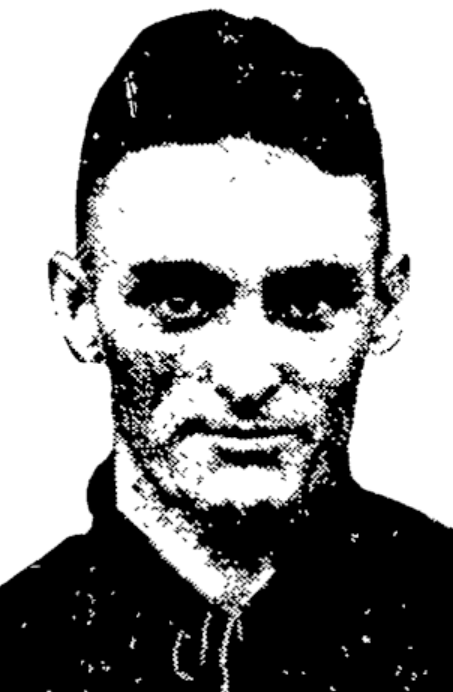
Ted Mincham kicked two goals for Richmond. He was in his 15th season of first grade rugby league and had represented New Zealand in 1935 and 1936 along with numerous other representative sides.

Two players were ordered off in the Ponsonby v Richmond match. The judicial committee decided to issue “a warning against any rough play” in future matches. Davies scored twice for Richmond in their backs. Charles Webb scored two conversions and two penalties, while Ted Mincham also kicked two penalties. N McKay played well at five eighth for the Newton-Mount Albert side. He was a good cricketer and played for the Auckland Junior side and then later senior cricket as well as captaining the Newton senior league side in future seasons.

16 May	Richmond	27-4 (9-2)	Ponsonby	Carlaw Park 1
3:00	Try: Davies 2, Ron McGregor, Jack Satherley, Henry Sale; Con: Charles Webb 2 Pen: Charles Webb 2, Ted Mincham 2		Pen: James Morrell 2	Referee: George Kelly

16 May	City-Otahuhu	27-7	Newton-Mt Albert	Carlaw Park 1
1:45	Try: Kenneth Finlayson, Alan Legge, Ray Halsey, V Gordon, B Taylor; Con: Alan Donovan 3 Pen: Alan Donovan 3		Try: Joseph; Pen: Roy Niwa 2	Referee: Stuart Billman

16 May	Manukau	33-5	Marist-North Shore	Carlaw Park 2
1:45	Try: Thew 2, Joe Murray, Aubrey Thompson, Steve Watene, Jack Major; Con: Tommy Chase 5 Pen: Tommy Chase		Try: Maurice Costello; Pen: Cyril Wiberg	Referee: Jack Hawkes

==== Round 3 ====
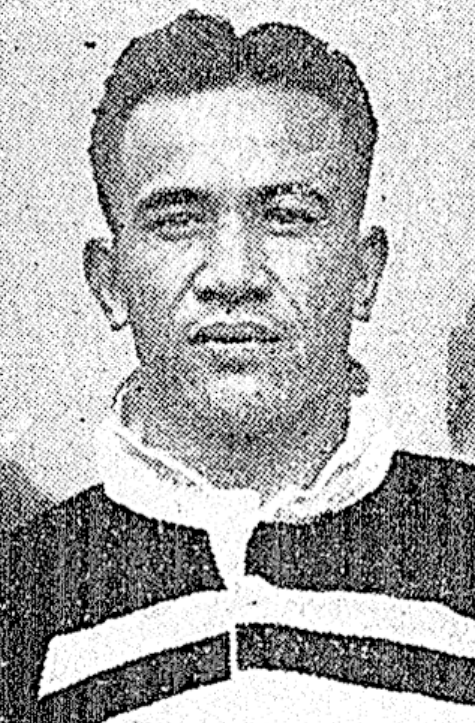
Tommy Chase

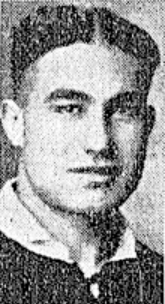
Hawea Mataira

The games were played before a "fair attendance"at Carlaw Park. Mount Albert decided that their players would bury “the hatchet and threw in their lot to amalgamate with Newton”. It was reported that “between the two teams a good all-round thirteen is possible”. They defeated the Marist-North Shore side 13 points to 2. There were four Mount Albert players added to the Newton players for the match. Though as North Shore had still not decided to contribute players to the opposition side their win was effectively over Marist. The only exception was Lindsay Simons. Marist five eighth Phil Donovan was said to have hung on to the ball too often which may have cost the side three tries. Veteran hooker for the Newton side, Maurice Quirke played there and won his team a lot of ball which was said to ultimately be the difference. He was in his tenth season for them. He also finished his career having played five games for Auckland, debuting in 1934 and playing again later in this season. Also in the Newton-Mt Albert side was Duncan, a third grade player from the previous year. He was "outstanding", showed speed, and was "a tiger for work". Manukau and Richmond met in the main game with both teams unbeaten. Manukau won 13-6 after taking a 5-0 halftime lead. The positional play of Tommy Chase and Joe Murray was instrumental and they could both turn defence into attack. Ivan Gregory had rejoined the side and as he moved into his accustomed position of centre three-quarter Chase moved into the five eighths to partner Murray, with the versatile Joe Broughton going to wing. The try to centre Ivan Gregory came after Broughton "raced past several Richmond defenders". Broughton was said to be in "remarkably good" form. He had been with the senior side since they were allowed back into the senior grade in 1936 and had played well over 70 games for them in that time. For Richmond their inside backs didn't work "smoothly" and struggled to get clean ball to their outside backs, but Ron McGregor was very good at centre and "handed on good passes" to his wings William Kinney and Davies after running with "splendid dash". Kinney on the left wing impressed and on one occasion dummied when confronted by Manukau wing, Butler, and scored "the best try of the day". In the other match City-Otahuhu beat Ponsonby 12-6 after an impressive display from halfback Doug Hutchison who "was in everything going", Alan Donovan at five eighth "played constructive football of a high order", while Jimmy Mullins at second five "made many clever openings". Their regular three quarters were not available and Nicholas on debut "was attractive when the ball came his way" on the wing. In their forwards Hawea Mataira was criticised for holding on to the ball too long which potentially cost two tries.

23 May	Manukau	13-6 (5-0)	Richmond	Carlaw Park 1
3:00	Try: Wiremu Te Tai, Jack Major, Ivan Gregory; Con: Tommy Chase; Pen: Tommy Chase		Try: Perkins, William Kinney	Referee: Emmet Pope

23 May	City-Otahuhu	12-6	Ponsonby	Carlaw Park 1
1:45	Try: Jimmy Mullins, Doug Hutchison; Con: Jimmy Mullins, Alan Donovan; Pen: Alan Donovan		Try: Hughes, William Thomas	Referee: Stuart Billman

23 May	Newton-Mt Albert	13-2	Marist-North Shore	Carlaw Park 2
3:00	Try: N McKay, Les Clement, Basil Cranch; Con: Les Clement, Basil Cranch		Pen: Cyril Wiberg	Referee: George Kelly

==== Round 4 ====
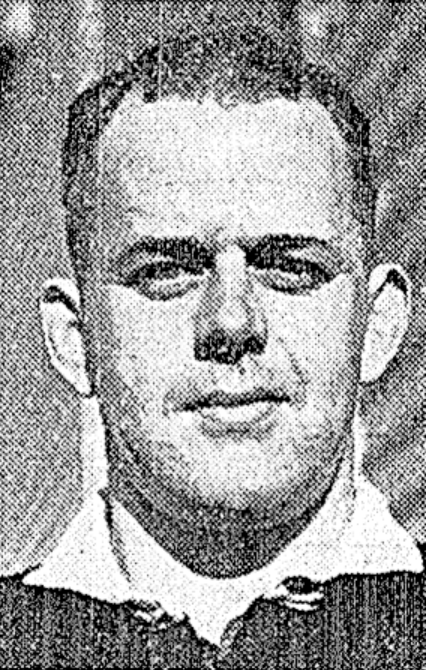
Bert Leatherbarrow in his 12th season of senior rugby league. He played one match for New Zealand in 1939 on their aborted tour of England against Dewsbury.

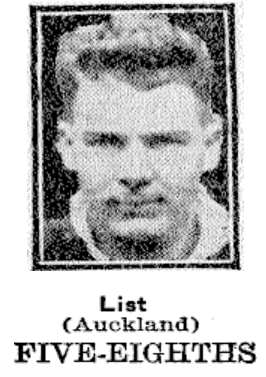
Claude List was remarkably in his 18th season of senior rugby league having debuted for Kingsland Rovers in 1925. He debuted for New Zealand in 1928 and played for them four times up until 1932

. The attendance was described as "fair" for the second week in a row. Alf Broadhead in his 9th season for Richmond was ordered off a few minutes into their match with City-Otahuhu which "severely penalised" them and was a key part of their 25-4 loss. The evidence of the incident was heard in committee and it was decided to take no action against him. Afterwards Chairman Watson spoke generally, appealing “to all players to support the referees in their difficult task”. The issue had arisen due to the “habit of senior players disputing referees’ decisions, with William Mincham, the delegate to the Referees Association saying it “was becoming a common complaint and he endorsed the remarks of the chairman”. Broadhead had played over 110 games for Richmond in his career making him one of their most capped players. His brother Stan had also played several times in the senior side in the past two seasons. The combined team only trailed 6-4 at halftime but the combined team ran away with the game in the second half. For the City-Otahuhu side their forwards won them the game. Hawea Mataira played a fine game and showed skill in the open and got the backs going. Two other forwards who stood out were brothers Norm Johnson and Joffre Johnson who showed speed in the open and the ability to handle the ball cleanly. The Herald remarked that "few players of recent years have impressed more" than them. Owen Hughes, who was in his tenth season of senior league played at full back and defended well. He had spent most of his years playing in the backline in various positions before moving into the forwards in recent seasons. Ray Halsey played on the wing and scored two tries. Halsey had played for Marist from 1937 to 1939 scoring 15 tries, then transferred to Papakura where he played the 1940-41 seasons and score 12 tries. With Papakura no longer in the senior grade he transferred to the Otahuhu club. For Manukau in their 10-5 win against Newton-Mount Albert, Toi, a winger from Northland scored on debut but this was to be his only try for them. Basil Cranch who usually played on the wing was at centre for the combined side. He made some handling errors but on other occasions got his wings away and showed excellent judgement in putting Moore away for a try. Bert Leatherbarrow played at hooker for them while fellow ex-international Claude List also appeared now aged 40.

30 May	City-Otahuhu	25-4 (6-4)	Richmond	Carlaw Park 1
3:00	Try: Ray Halsey 2, K Simons, Walter Findlater, Joffre Johnson, Norm Johnson; Con: Alan Donovan, Jimmy Mullins		Pen: Charles Webb 2	Referee: Stuart Billman

30 May	Manukau	10-5	Newton-Mt Albert	Carlaw Park 1
1:45	Try: Toi, W Butler; Pen: Tommy Chase 2		Try: Moore; Pen: Basil Cranch	Referee: Emmet Pope

30 May	Marist-North Shore	7-2	Ponsonby	Carlaw Park 2
1:45	Try: Dave McWilliams; Pen: Cyril Wiberg 2		Pen: James Morrell	Referee: H Tate

==== Round 5 ====
Manukau fielded a very large forward pack, even with Steve Watene absent they at times placed just five men in the scrum giving them an extra man in the backs against Ponsonby. The result was that all five of their tries came from back movements with Tommy Chase scoring one and converting three of them in their 21-3 win. Their fullback, Ralph Martin at full back "gave a fine exhibition of positional play... he fielded cleanly and placed his kicks with good length and judgement". Roy Niwa was said to have played his best game since transferring from Taranaki scored 14 points through two tries, two conversions, and two penalties, helping Newton-Mount Albert beat Richmond 23-17. Niwa was well supported by James Silva in the five eithths and Les Clement at halfback "gave good service". Richmond re-ordered their back line and it functioned well, such that at halftime they had an 8-5 lead. C Williams moved into halfback, switching places with Charles Webb who went to first five eighth. At second was Ron McGregor, and William Kinney took his centre three-quarter spot. Davies and J McDonald were the wingers. It was remarked that Webb was "alert in search of openings" and the players outside him had the pace to make the most of it. The City-Otahuhu were missing some regular players, and Marist ran them close. Maurice Costello nearly scored after the five eighth pierced the defence and then short punted but the ball just beat him before he could ground near the goal. Then later Dave McWilliams made a "spirited dash" from 30 yards but was pushed out in the corner. For the winners who were described as "disappointing", the "clever play" of Doug Hutchison at halfback, and Jimmy Mullins and Alan Donovan in the five eighths helped them to win.

6 June	Newton-Mt Albert	23-17 (5-8)	Richmond	Carlaw Park 1
3:00	Try: Roy Niwa 2, Les Clement, Jack Zane-Zaninovich, Moore; Con: Roy Niwa 2 Pen: Roy Niwa 2		Try: Davies, J McDonald, C Williams, Jack Satherley, William Kinney; Pen: Jack Satherley	Referee: Emmet Pope

6 June	Manukau	21-3 (13-3)	Ponsonby	Carlaw Park 1
1:45	Try: W Butler, Jack Major, Joe Murray, Tommy Chase, George Shilton; Con: Tommy Chase 3		Try: William Thomas	Referee: J O'Shannessey

6 June	City-Otahuhu	6-0	Marist-North Shore	Carlaw Park 2
3:00	Try: Reginald Martin, Kenneth Finlayson			Referee: H Tate

==== Round 6 ====
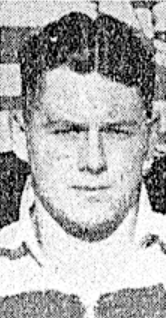
Arthur Kay (Ponsonby five eighth)

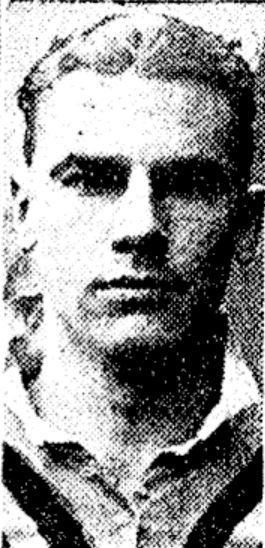
Brian Riley (Ponsonby)

It was decided at the end of the first round with City-Otahuhu undefeated and with Manukau with one loss (in round 1 to City-Otahuhu) that their match would act as a semi-final for the senior championship. If City-Otahuhu won they would win the competition, however it was decided after their loss that the competition would continue for its full duration of 3 rounds. Prior to the start of the games Chairman J.W. Watson “extended a welcome to members and nurses of overseas forces and the Manukau team gave a spirited haka”. Manukau's hooker, Aubrey Thompson "shone in open play, and with determined running got two tries in the early stages of the game". George Shilton and McLean also scored tries. Tommy Chase converted three of them with one right from the edge of the field. Once again Ralph Martin at full back showed fine positional play and kicked well and it was said "on the present season's form Martin has no superior in the code in Auckland". On the wing for City-Otahuhu, Ray Halsey got a spectacular try after "quickly seizing a chance and running with fine determination". He would have had more chances during the day if not for the good covering by the Manukau backs. For Richmond Ron McGregor at centre was "speedy" and ran his wings into good position with the result that William Kinney scored twice and J McDonald once. Kinney was reported to have been in his first season in the seniors and "was doing remarkably well", he handled the ball "splendidly" and had a "big turn of speed". Kinney had in fact debuted for the senior side in the preliminary rounds of the previous season and made a more official debut in the Phelan Shield knockout competition later in the same season. Referee Stuart Billman refereed his 100th match involving first grade club teams when he took control of the Newton-Mount Albert v Ponsonby match although it is unlikely the league was aware of this fact as record keeping was relatively poor at the time. He became just the third referee to achieve the feat after Les Bull and Percy Rogers. For Newton-Mount Albert their inside backs, Les Clement at halfback, and Charlie Renton and N McKay giving "good service". McKay was steadily improving and made several openings for the outside backs. Maurice Quirke was once again very good at hooker. Des Williams was "outstanding" for Ponsonby at halfback. In 1941 he gave "high class displays" when paired with five eighths Arthur Kay, and Brian Riley, two Ponsonby stalwarts who had both played for New Zealand. It was reported after the round that North Shore Albions had officially decided to "bury the hatchet" and provide players to the combined team with Marist. The club held a special meeting with negotiations being carried out by Joe Sayegh (president), Jack Kirwan (secretary) of the Marist club, and North Shore being represented by Horace Hunt and J Mann. It was reported that six North Shore players would be available for the following round.

13 June	Manukau	20-12	City-Otahuhu	Carlaw Park 1
3:00	Try: Aubrey Thompson 2, George Shilton, McLean; Con: Tommy Chase 3 Pen: Tommy Chase		Try: Ray Halsey, Hawea Mataira; Con: Alan Donovan 2 Pen: Alan Donovan	Referee: George Kelly

13 June	Richmond	13-8	Marist-North Shore	Carlaw Park 1
1:45	Try: William Kinney 2, J McDonald; Con: Charles Webb; Pen: Ted Mincham		Try: Harry Dickson, Dave McWilliams; Con: Cyril Wiberg	Referee: H Tate

13 June	Newton-Mt Albert	14-8	Ponsonby	Carlaw Park 2
3:00	Try: N McKay, Joseph, Maurice Quirke, Basil Cranch; Con: Basil Cranch		Try: Manuel, Des Williams; Con: Des Williams	Referee: Stuart Billman

==== Round 7 ====
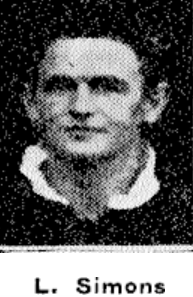
Lindsay Simons (North Shore)

Round 7 was the first time that North Shore had made an official contribution of players to the amalgamated side with Marist. A meeting between representatives of the two clubs during the week had resulted in North Shore decide to contribute 6 players to the side for Saturday. They were forwards Jack Rutherford, Horace Hunt, Tom Field, Lindsay Simons (though he had previously played), and backs C Meredith (full back), and Penman. In the match between Newton-Mount Albert and City-Otahuhu won 16-10 by the former both sides fielded two fullbacks new to the position. The scores were tied 5-5 at halftime. N McKay played well there for Marist-North Shore, but Jimmy Mullins for City-Otahuhu's loss from the second five eighths positions upset their inside attack. Ray Halsey was showing good form on the right wing for the City-Otahuhu side. He was said to have a "fine physique and speed, but is showing a tendency to try and crash past opponents instead of looking for a supporting player". Doug Hutchison at halfback was "easily the best of the City backs". On the opposite side Moore on the wing scored two tries as the result of being up with the play. For Ponsonby, Rapana debuted at full back. A former rugby player he showed clean fielding, good positional play and kicked with good length though on occasion over the sideline on the full and straight to the full back. He was said to be much more heavily built than the average fullback. He went on to play for Ponsonby for two more seasons. Ponsonby won 8-5 over Richmond with tries scored by Beasley and Hughes with Hughes also converting one. Richmond's lone try came when William Kinney on the left wing showed "sheer speed" to get around his opposite and then beat a converging defence to get to the try line. Davies then converted from a wide angle. On the wing for Manukau, Butler was "splendid" and scored four tries, while Tommy Chase "gave a first class display of goal kicking" with all five goal from "a long range".

20 June	Newton-Mt Albert	16-10 (5-5)	City-Otahuhu	Carlaw Park 1
3:00	Try: Moore 2, Les Clement, Jack Zane-Zaninovich; Con: Roy Niwa 2		Try: Norm Johnson, Alan Donovan; Con: Alan Donovan; Pen: Alan Donovan	Referee: Stuart Billman

20 June	Ponsonby	8-5	Richmond	Carlaw Park 1
1:45	Try: Hughes, Beasley; Con: Hughes		Try: William Kinney; Con: Davies	Referee: Emmet Pope

20 June	Manukau	37-9	Marist-North Shore	Carlaw Park 2
3:00	Try: W Butler 4, Aubrey Thompson 3, Joe Murray, Lipscombe; Con: Tommy Chase 5		Try: Dave McWilliams; Con: C Meredith; Pen: C Meredith 2	Referee: George Kelly

==== Round 8 ====
The standout player from round 8 was Alan Donovan who scored 23 points for City-Otahuhu in their 44-3 win over Ponsonby. He scored 3 tries and converted 7 of their 10 tries. Ray Halsey on the wing also scored 3 tries. After the matches the Auckland Star wrote a small piece on the leading point scorers for the competition to date. Roy Niwa, who had moved north from New Plymouth where he had been playing rugby had moved into 3rd position (38 points) after kicking 5 goals in Newton-Mt Albert's 24-15 win over Marist-North Shore. Tommy Chase was second with 53 points and Alan Donovan was first with 56 points. The Auckland Star said that he had been standing out as a "brilliant attacking five eighth in deep drives into the Ponsonby back formation before sending the ball on". The Ponsonby tackling was "weak", with only Hogan and Carr who "did their best with resolute stopping". The Manukau hooker, Aubrey Thompson on current form "must be rated as the teams best forward" according to the press. He essentially won them the match over Richmond by 11 points to 10 when they trailed 8-10 with time almost up. Thompson got the ball ten yards from the Richmond line and "acceleration and changes of pace and direction got him past two opponents who converged on him and a final dive landed him over the line much to the delight of Manukau supporters". Richmond played extremely well in the backs, especially considering halfback/five eighth Charles Webb was absent, with Jack Magill "giving an excellent exhibition of full back play" and William Kinney on the wing showing "brilliance" and was "one of the fastest players in the game".

27 June	City-Otahuhu	44-3 (16-3)	Ponsonby	Carlaw Park 1
3:00	Try: Alan Donovan 3, Ray Halsey 3, Norm Johnson, K Simons, Kenneth Finlayson, Alan Legge; Con: Alan Donovan 7		Try: Des Williams	Referee: H Tate

27 June	Manukau	11-10	Richmond	Carlaw Park 1
1:45	Try: Aubrey Thompson 2, W Butler; Con: Tommy Chase		Try: Leo Davis, J McDonald; Con: Leo Davis; Drop: C Williams	Referee: Jack Hawkes

27 June	Newton-Mt Albert	24-15	Marist-North Shore	Carlaw Park 2
3:00	Try: Brady, Bert Leatherbarrow, W.C. McKinnon, Jack Ginders; Con: Roy Niwa 4 Pen: Roy Niwa 2		Try: Dave McWilliams 2, Horace Hunt; Con: C Meredith, Cyril Wiberg; Pen: Cyril Wiberg	Referee: A Pearson

==== Round 9 ====
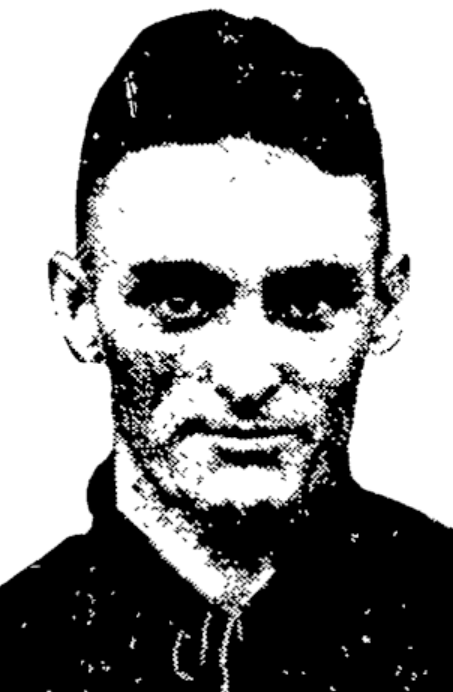
Ted Mincham came on as a replacement for William Kinney and scored a try and kicked a conversion to help give Richmond their one point win.

Manukau fielded Tommy Chase and Joe Murray in the five eighths and Steve Watene in the rare position of centre three-quarter. Watene was said to be a "tower of strength". With this good combination the wings got a "fair share of the ball" and Butler scored two tries and was "outstanding". Their forwards combined well with the backs and showed good inter-change passing and if not for faulty handling at times they could have won by more. Once again Roy Niwa played a "fine game" for the Newton-Mount Albert side on the wing. He converted both of their tries and kicked a penalty. He "ran fast and fearlessly in attack, and defended in a stubborn way". Moore had less chances on the other wing but "played well", and Basil Cranch at centre opened up play well for them. Manukau only led 8-2 at halftime but took over in the second half. Richmond trailed City-Otahuhu 0-7 at halftime but had all the play in the second half and won by a point. Veteran back Ted Mincham had come on to replace William Kinney on the wing and scored a try in their second half revival. Ron McGregor scored their second try and Mincham's conversion gave them the winning lead of 8-7. Mincham was then outstanding in the team's defence towards the end. For the losers Robert Grotte gave a good display at second five eighth opening up the play for his outsides and kicking for his wings well. It was the former New Zealand representative's first game of the season. K Simons, Smith, and Ray Halsey made a good three quarter line with Halsey giving another "fine display on attack". C Meredith who was said to have come "over with a reputation" from rugby union "has not been a success at full back". His fielding of the ball was said to be good but his kicking lacked direction and he didn't open up play for his three quarters. Penman at centre and Harry Dickson on the wing were impressive. Tom Field was their best forward and he was well supported by Horace Hunt in his 12th season of senior football and Don McLeod in his 4th. An annoying habit was noted in the Auckland Star that the games were being kicked off far beyond the advertaised start times. The #1 field early game was kicked off at 2:04 rather than the scheduled 1:45 and although it was ended early at 3:12 the main game scheduled for 3:00 was not able to be started until 3:17. Matches in this era had very loose running time and were generally only 30 to 35 minutes per half at the discretion of the referee.

4 July	Manukau	23-12 (8-2)	Newton-Mt Albert	Carlaw Park 1
3:00	Try: W Butler 2, Turei, Aubrey Thompson, Pita Ririnui; Con: Tommy Chase 3 Pen: Tommy Chase		Try: Joe Ginders, Herbert Zane-Zaninovich; Con: Roy Niwa 2 Pen: Roy Niwa	Referee: George Kelly

4 July	Richmond	8-7 (0-7)	City-Otahuhu	Carlaw Park
1:45	Try: Ted Mincham, Ron McGregor; Con: Ted Mincham		Try: Robert Grotte; Con: Jimmy Mullins; Pen: Jimmy Mullins	Referee: J O'Shannessey

4 July	Marist-North Shore	15-5	Ponsonby	Carlaw Park 2
3:00	Try: Penman, Harry Dickson, Skinner; Con: Cyril Wiberg; Pen: Cyril Wiberg, C Meredith		Try: Beasley; Pen: Hogan	Referee: Stuart Billman

==== Round 10 ====
It was decided that at the end of the second round of games “it was proposed to adhere to a decision to play a third round in the senior championship”. A “Victory Trophy, a gift of war bonds” (£10) would go to the team with the most competition points in the matches remaining. Manukau's loss meant that City-Otahuhu closed to within 2 competition points of them on the table. The games were played in heavy rain on slippery Carlaw Park grounds with a greasy ball. Ponsonby scored an upset win over Manukau after greatly reinforcing their side. Len Jordan who had come over from Northcote & Birkenhead Ramblers 2 years earlier turned out, along with Arthur Kay, Percy Herkt (who had played for Papakura and then Wellington), and Marsh (a 17 stone ex Manukau player), Roy Nurse, and Hughes. Several of them were said to be on leave from overseas and might be available for another week. Jordan would go on to represent New Zealand, curiously he did not play for Ponsonby in 1941 despite playing 4 games and scoring 2 tries in 1940. It was said that the reinforcements were a "well kept secret" with not even the management committee knowing about them and if it had been known then the match might have been billed as the main attraction. In the first half Kay sent the ball on to Hughes who passed to Joran who :cut the defence to ribbons, gave several Manukau players the perfect dummy and raced over". For Manukau their only points came from the boot of Tommy Chase. Of his three penalties, two were from over 40 yards out on the angle, while Kay also kicked well for Ponsonby. C Day was on his debut as a 1st grade referee in the Ponsonby v Manukau match. K McArthur the North Shore halfback from previous seasons played his first game for the combined Marist-North Shore side. He "did excellent work in attack and defence" against City-Otahuhu. The combined side whowed how strong they were when they still won 10-5 despite not having Hawea Mataira, Kenneth Finlayson, Norm Johnson, Joffre Johnson, Ray Halsey, and J Hutchison. Their five eighth Alan Donovan continued his excellent form by scoring a try and kicking a conversion and penalty while K Simon scored their other try. Richmond narrowly avoided defeat when they beat Newton-Mount Albert 8-7 after a successful late C Williams penalty kick near the posts. They had led 6-0 at halftime but a converted try and penalty put the underdogs in front. The game was of a scrambling nature but both forward packs played good wet weather football. The Newton-Mount Albert side was reinforced in the backs by Harry Emus who kicked a conversion and a penalty though it was not a day for a winger in the conditions, while in their forwards one of the best front rowers in the competition over recent season, prop Richard Shadbolt played. Both teams full backs played very well. N McKay for Newton-Mount Albert "came through the day without evident fault, while Magill was unlucky on one occasion, he slipped while trying to force when the ball went over the Richmond try-line between the posts" and Basil Cranch came through to score. For Richmond J McDonald, Ron McGregor, and William Kinney were useful, while C Williams was good at halfback.

18 July	Richmond	8-7 (6-0)	Newton-Mt Albert	Carlaw Park 1
3:00	Try: William Kinney, John Crookall; Pen: C Williams		Try: Basil Cranch; Con: Harry Emus; Pen: Harry Emus	Referee: J O’Shannessey

18 July	City-Otahuhu	10-5	Marist-North Shore	Carlaw Park 1
1:45	Try: Alan Donovan, K Simons; Con: Alan Donovan; Pen: Alan Donovan		Try: Penman; Pen: Cyril Wiberg	Referee: Jack Donovan

18 July	Ponsonby	11-6	Manukau	Carlaw Park 2
3:00	Try: Len Jordan; Con: Arthur Kay; Pen: Arthur Kay 3		Pen: Tommy Chase 3	Referee: C Day

==== Round 11 ====
Merv Devine made his first appearance of the season for Richmond. He had joined them in 1938 after previously having represented Wairarapa, Manawatu, and Wellington in rugby union. For Ponsonby Roy Nurse, Len Jordan, and Arthur Kay "all played well" with Jordan scoring the crucial try in their 7-6 win. Percy Herkt, who had debuted for them the previous week after having previously played for Wellington and Papakura "played a great game in the forwards". He had become well known in the competition as he had a "flowing black beard". Marsh in his second game of the season for Ponsonby (he had transferred the year prior) also "put in some hard solo runs which took a lot of stopping". William Kinney on the wing for Richmond scored a try after a cross kick from J McDonald, and then Jack Magill scored a rare full back try for the same side after "a brilliant run" from centre Ron McGregor took him to the Ponsonby full back Panapa. McGregor passed the ball back on the inside to Magill who ran in wide of the posts. Richmond had led 3-0 at halftime and held the lead until 70 minutes had passed before "the winning try came from fast chain passing from the backs and Kay and Edgar Morgan changed direction to send Jordan "a clear run between the posts". In the City-Otahuhu match against Newton-Mt Albert the 3 Johnson brothers were all absent along with Hawea Mataira and Kenneth Finlayson however they still managed to win anyway. On the Newton-Mt Albert side Edgar Tredea made his first appearance of the season. He had been trained as a pilot officer but was hoping to be available to play some more matches. Jack Hemi likewise made his first appearance of the season for Manukau in the five eighth position. He "put in several dodgy runs" and was expected to speed up their attack. Manukau was said to be handicapped by not having an experienced hooker after Jack Rutherford had left the side at the end of the previous season. He had transferred to the Marist-North Shore side and was opposed to them in this game. Despite the fact that he was securing the ball for his team and McArthur at half back was playing well they were unable to take real advantage of it and lost 15-5.

25 July	Ponsonby	7-6 (0-3)	Richmond	Carlaw Park 1
3:00	Try: Len Jordan; Con: Arthur Kay; Pen: Arthur Kay		Try: William Kinney, Jack Magill	Referee: Emmet Pope

25 July	Manukau	15-5	Marist-North Shore	Carlaw Park 1
1:45	Try: Joe Murray 2, Taylor; Con: Tommy Chase 3		Try: Don McLeod; Con: C Meredith	Referee: George Kelly

25 July	City-Otahuhu	18-10	Newton-Mt Albert	Carlaw Park 2
3:00	Try: K Simons 2, Alan Donovan, V Gordon; Con: Alan Donovan 3		Try: Moore, Pone; Con: Roy Niwa; Pen: Roy Niwa	Referee: Stuart Billman

==== Round 12 ====
The Mt Albert players wore armbands to respect their teammate Malcolm (Mal) Cato who had been killed in action. Maurice Quirke (Newton-Mt Albert), and Marsh (Ponsonby) were both sent off in their match with each other. The judicial committee subsequently suspended both players for “four club playing Saturdays for misconduct on the field”. Both clubs appealed the decision a week later and the issue was taken in committee. Chairman Watson “stated afterwards that the penalty had been altered from four playing club days to four playing Saturdays”. Tommy Chase brought his season points tally to 102 after kicking 5 goals in Manukau's win over City-Otahuhu. It was his goal kicking which decided the game which City-Otahuhu had led 6-4 at half time with both teams only scoring one try each. It was said that City-Otahuhu was without the services of the Johnson brothers, though one of the four obviously played as "Johnson" was their lone try scorer. It was said that referee Jack Donovan "handled the game firmly and was justly severe on illegal tripping". Donovan's brother Alan was playing at five eighth for the City-Otahuhu side. Jack Hemi was said to be always a "thorn in the side" of the opposition for Manukau and their best back with his "weaving runs and ability to force openings", while Joe Murray also "played splendidly" and Butler also "did a lot of useful work on the wing". Steve Watene played at centre three-quarter until late in the match when he switched places with George Shilton in the forwards. Wiremu Te Tai, Aubrey Thompson, and Pita Ririnui were all "outstanding among the forwards". For City-Otahuhu, Ray Halsey was good on the wing while Alan Donovan and Doug Hutchison were prominent on attack and defense and Kenneth Finlayson hooked well. Donovan at five eighth also "paired well" with Robert Grotte the former New Zealand representative half back. The combined side was strengthened by the addition of Jim Gould on the wing "where he showed fine speed and initiative". Ponsonby beat Newton-Mount Albert 13-4 with tries to Roy Nurse, Len Jordan, and halfback Des Williams who was said to have played "easily his best game this season, and pave the way for three tries". There was "perfect understanding" between Arthur Kay and Jordan in the five eighths and Nurse who was playing in the new position of centre three-quarter, away from his usual position on the wing. Referee R. Rowland was on debut in the Marist-North Shore v Richmond match. For the combined side Eric Chatham (North Shore) played his first game of the season and scored a try. His five eighth partner Dave McWilliams was "the best back on the ground and his ability would be seen amongst stronger company". In the Richmond side their most impressive backs were their young five eighths, J McDonald and Deason. Both scored tries along with William Kinney.

1 August	Manukau	13-9 (4-6)	City-Otahuhu	Carlaw Park 1
3:00	Try: George Shilton; Con: Tommy Chase; Pen: Tommy Chase 4		Try: Mick Johnson; Pen: Alan Donovan 3	Referee: Jack Donovan

1 August	Ponsonby	13-4	Newton-Mt Albert	Carlaw Park 1
1:45	Try: Des Williams, Roy Nurse, Len Jordan; Con: Arthur Kay; Pen: Arthur Kay		Pen: Basil Cranch 2	Referee: C Day

1 August	Marist-North Shore	23-11	Richmond	Carlaw Park 2
3:00	Try: Jack Rutherford, Eric Chatham, Jimmy White, Horace Hunt, C Meredith; Con: C Meredith 2 Pen: C Meredith 2		Try: Deason, William Kinney, J McDonald; Con: C Williams	Referee: R Rowland

==== Round 13 ====
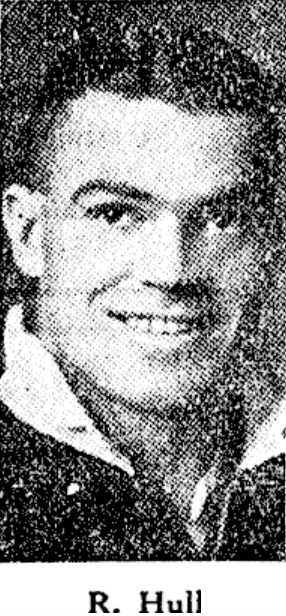
Richard (Dick) Hull, debuted for Ponsonby. He had played rugby for Wellington, Auckland and the North Island and would go on to represent Auckland (1943) and the North Island (1944) at rugby league.

With Manukau's 19-3 win over Richmond they had secured their second ever Fox Memorial title after their first in 1936. Their win had put them 6 points clear of their nearest rival (City-Otahuhu) with just 2 rounds remaining. Richmond made a good game of it and at halftime the scores were locked at 0-0. In the second half Manukau played Wiremu Te Tai off the scrum essentially giving them an extra back and this caused more interplay between the backs and forwards resulting in five tries with Tommy Chase converting two of them. Their five eighths Jack Hemi, and Joe Murray were under heavy defence all day but Hemi "on one occasion got away to record a spectacular try". Butler on the wing "played dashing football" and Ralph Martin "played his usual safe game at full back". Richmond were so under manned that Deason and Davies had to be played in the forwards and Charles Webb, a halfback was played on the wing. Ron McGregor was the outstanding player in their back line, getting to play in his regular position. Their full back was Jack Magill who "was extremely safe, and kicked with good length and direction". Jimmy White and Harry Dickson "revealed speed and plenty of dash" on the wings for Marist-North Shore in a 13-3 against Newton-Mount Albert. In the forwards, Horace Hunt and Don McLeod "excelled and Rutherford did his job well as a hooker". For Marist-North Shore their five eighths Dave McWilliams and Maurice Costello were enterprising on attack" and combined well. Richard (Dick) R. Hull made his surprise debut for Ponsonby. He was an ex-Wellington and Auckland representative and had played for the North Island side in 1936. For Ponsonby it was said in the Herald that there is "no more improved half back in the code than [Des] Williams whose anticipation and smart runs from the base of the scrum stamp him as an ideal player". Jordan and Kay were also playing well but it was suggested that they lack a hooker.

8 August	Manukau	19-3 (0-0)	Richmond	Carlaw Park 1
3:00	Try: George Shilton, Tom Butler, Thew, Jack Hemi, Wiremu Te Tai; Con: Tommy Chase 2		Try: Leo Davies	Referee: Stuart Billman

8 August	Marist-North Shore	13-3 (13-?)	Newton-Mt Albert	Carlaw Park 1
1:45	Try: Horace Hunt, Maurice Costello, Don McLeod; Con: C Meredith 2		Try: Les Clement	Referee: Jack Hawkes

8 August	Ponsonby	23-11	City-Otahuhu	Carlaw Park 2
3:00	Try: Roy Nurse, Arthur Kay, James Morrell, Len Jordan, Des Williams; Con: Arthur Kay 3 Pen: Arthur Kay		Try: Jim Gould; Con: Alan Donovan; Pen: Alan Donovan, Mullins 2	Referee: George Kelly

==== Round 14 ====
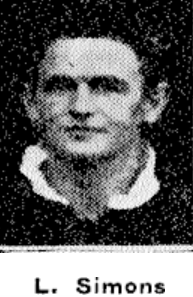
Lindsay Simons kicked 2 penalties for Marist-North Shore. He debuted for North Shore in 1927 as a 17 year old. In 1929 he played for Auckland and trialed for New Zealand. Simons also played for Wellington in 1930 before returning to Auckland.

Ordinarily when the 1st grade title had been decided the ARL would make the decision to conclude the competition and move into the Roope Rooster knockout competition however with the Victory Trophy (war bonds) being awarded to the team with the best record in the final round it was decided to continue the full season of 3 rounds and 15 matches for each team. Playing in his second game of rugby league the Auckland Star wrote that Richard (Dick) Hull "was the outstanding forward for Ponsonby against Marist-North Shore. He worked untiringly in the tight and showed how to open up the game with long passing to get his backs going. Hull is a forward of the type which Ponsonby has needed and it is now able to field a heavy weight pack. Partnered in the front row with Hull as Squires, 15st, and if in the matches to come, Sullivan another 15st forward, and Marsh 17st, are fielded, the pack will be one of the heaviest in the code". Ponsonby won 10-4 with tries to Arthur Kay, who converted both, and Roy Nurse. For Marist-North Shore their scorer was 32 year old veteran Lindsay Simons. He picked two penalties and had started the game in the loose forwards but when full back Cyril Wiberg went off injured, Simons covered that position and "played in a cool and resourceful way". His penalties made the score 5-4 before with a minute to go, a pass was dropped and Nurse picked it up to seal the victory. Nurse played at centre "and was in good form", while Len Jordan was "useful" in the five eighths with Kay. Their outstanding back however was Des Williams at half back. Rapana at full back showed "improved form". In Manukau's 27-8 win over Newton-Mount Albert in the curtain-raiser, the feature was their captain, Tommy Chase's six goals which took his season total to 116 points. In City-Otahuhu's 13-6 win against Richmond Mick Johnson scored a try for the winners. He was one of the four brothers who was representing the side though most of them had been unavailable recently.

15 August	Ponsonby	10-4 (5-0)	Marist-North Shore	Carlaw Park 1
3:00	Try: Arthur Kay, Roy Nurse; Con: Arthur Kay 2		Pen: Lindsay Simons 2	Referee: George Kelly

15 August	Manukau	27-8	Newton-Mt Albert	Carlaw Park 1
1:45	Try: Taylor 2, Wiremu Te Tai 2, Mikaere; Con: Tommy Chase 5 Pen: Tommy Chase		Try: Basil Cranch; Con: Basil Cranch; Pen: Basil Cranch	Referee: Emmet Pope

15 August	City-Otahuhu	13-6	Richmond	Carlaw Park 1
3:00	Try: Mick Johnson, Doug Hutchison, K Simons; Con: Alan Donovan; Drop: Alan Donovan		Try: Deason, William Kinney	Referee: H Tate

==== Round 15 ====
Manukau won the Victory Trophy (war bonds) with their defeat of Ponsonby. Both teams were undefeated in the final round with 4 wins each, and their match with each other effectively decided the trophy. For much of the game the score was close with the scores tied 2–2 after 60 minutes before Manukau put on 26 points to win comfortably 28–2. They were said to have given "a remarkable exhibition of interplay, and in a series of raids forwards and backs thrust onward in a way that made the Ponsonby defence, excellent up to that point, crumble...". Jack Hemi and Joe Murray in the five eighths "were the pivot of the attack" with Hemi scoring one try and Murray two, and Ralph Martin at full back "gave a clever display and started passing movements from many positions". William Inglis debuted for them on the wing "and made a good impression". In their forwards Aubrey Thompson (two tries) and Wiremu Te Tai (one try) were "outstanding" and Pita Ririnui and Steve Watene "did splendid work in the loose", though Watene was criticised in the Herald for trying to "unnecessarily use his strength". Ponsonby's forwards included Pat McKenzie (Wellington), and K. Ward (Hawke's Bay), both former rugby players with 15st 5lb McKenzie having played for Wellington B. Ward was 12st 6lb and fast, being "useful in the open play". Both were said to have played well in the loose play, handling cleanly and with McKenzie "sending out long passes for his backs to collect". Dick Hull gave another "fine display" and made the scrum very solid. The New Zealand Herald remarked that “the speed and splendid handling of both backs and forwards stamped Manukau as a brilliant combination which compares favourably with the best seen at Carlaw Park since it was opened in 1921. Hawea Mataira turned out for City-Otahuhu for the first time since round 1 scored a try in their easy 33-5 win over Marist-North Shore. Owen Hughes hooked well for the winners and also got involved with the backs where his career had started and scored two tries. The City-Otahuhu backs of Alan Donovan, Doug Hutchison, K Simons, and Jim Gould all combined effectively. Newton-Mount Albert "shaded" Richmond 8 points to 2, with fullback N McKay scoring a fine solo try. Les Clement at halfback and Zane-Zaninovich and Colin Cowley showed "perfect understanding" in the inside backs.

22 August	Manukau	28-2	Ponsonby	Carlaw Park 1
3:00	Try: Joe Murray 2, Aubrey Thompson 2, Jack Hemi, Wiremu Te Tai; Con: Tommy Chase 4 Pen: Steve Watene		Pen: Arthur Kay	Referee: Stuart Billman

22 August	Newton-Mt Albert	8-2	Richmond	Carlaw Park 1
1:45	Try: Les Clement, N McKay; Con: Basil Cranch		Pen: Jack Magill	Referee: George Kelly

22 August	City-Otahuhu	33-5	Marist-North Shore	Carlaw Park
3:00	Try: Owen Hughes 2, Mick Johnson, Eugene Donovan, Jim Gould, K Simons, Doug Hutchison, Hawea Mataira, Alan Donovan; Con: Alan Donovan 3		Try: Bruce Graham; Con: Lindsay Simons	Referee: Emmet Pope

=== Roope Rooster ===
==== Round 1 ====
It was decided after the first round matches that the Phelan Shield would not be competed for this year. It was traditionally played for as a knockout trophy between teams who had been eliminated in the first round of the Roope Rooster competition. Manukau were upset in round 1 which made the Roope Rooster draw easier to complete as they had made arrangements to travel to Wellington to play the local representative side the following weekend. Manukau only scoring two points was as big of a surprise as the loss. The winners made "low-hard" tackles throughout the game upset their backs. Bruce Graham was the standout player for Marist-North Shore and "frequently led the pack in sweeping sorties" and scored a "fine try". Horace Hunt captained the side and proved very able "rallying the forwards to greater efforts" and Graham, Tom Field, and Don McLeod responded, while Jack Rutherford hooked well, and Skinner at lock "was in all attacks". Dave McWilliams and Maurice Costello spoiled the tactics of Manukau and contained Jack Hemi and Joe Murray. Costello scored two tries and was said to be possibly the best back on the ground. Lindsay Simons was useful at fullback and "was a reliable last line of defence". In Ponsonby's 15-5 win over Newton-Mount Albert, W Briggs and Edgar Morgan were the most prominent of the forwards in the loose, while Dick Hull played another solid game. N McKay for the losers was the better of the fullbacks, fielding the ball well, kicking with judgment, and defending resolutely. While J Rapana at fullback for Ponsonby also played a clever game, and showed steady improvement, and was said to be "the outstanding Ponsonby player". Roy Nurse on the wing "played a splendid game". Len Jordan and Arthur Kay "were prominent on attack" in the five eighths.

5 September	Ponsonby	15-5 (10-0)	Newton-Mt Albert	Carlaw Park 1
3:00	Try: Carr, Len Jordan, Marsh; Con: Arthur Kay 2 Pen: Arthur Kay		Try: Les Clement; Pen: Basil Cranch	Referee: J O'Shannessey

5 September	Marist-North Shore	14-2	Manukau	Carlaw Park 1
1:45	Try: Maurice Costello 2, Bruce Graham, Tom Field; Con: Lindsay Simons		Pen: Tommy Chase	Referee: Stuart Billman

==== Semi finals ====
"Several heavy showers made conditions unpleasant, and the attendance was only fair" at Carlaw Park. In Marist-North Shore's 14-14 win over City-Otahuhu, their second five eighth, Eric Chatham "showed fine speed and initiative in attack" in the centre-three quarter position. He had played at second five eighth the previous season. He got very good service from Dave McWilliams and Maurice Costello in the five eighths. Benny Crocker was "a tower of strenghth" at halfback. Tom Field and Horace Hunt "stood out with their clever play, good handling and speed in open play" while Skinner, a "light forward" was involved in raiding play. For City-Otahuhu, Hawea Mataira led them well in the forwards and brothers Norm Johnson and Joffre Johnson support him well. The score had been 3-2 to City-Otahuhu at halftime but the second half saw 24 of the matches 29 points scored and six tries. Jack Rutherford's hooking for Marist-North Shore "played a decisive part in the victory". Jack Satherley reappeared for Richmond at hooker which was a crucial factor in their 7-6 win over Ponsonby. Jack Magill at fullback "played one of his best games this season" and saved the team on several occasions. Their outstanding forward was John Crookall.

12 September	Marist-North Shore	15-14 (2-3)	City-Otahuhu	Carlaw Park 1
3:00	Try: Tom Field, Horace Hunt, Maurice Costello; Con: Lindsay Simons 2 Pen: Lindsay Simons		Try: Hawea Mataira, Alan Donovan, Peter McManus, Joffre Johnson; Con: Alan Donovan	Referee: George Kelly

12 September	Richmond	7-6	Ponsonby	Carlaw Park 1
1:45	Try: Jack Satherley; Con: Jack Magill; Pen: Jack Magill		Try: Arthur Kay, W Briggs	Referee: Jack Donovan

==== Final ====
Richmond's 13-6 win over the combined Marist-North Shore side was their 7th Roope Rooster title. The feature of the match was the "great struggle" between the forwards. Bruce Graham was outstanding for Marist-North Shore while J Williams and McLeod "gave Richmond fine service". Their captain, Horace Hunt was absent through injury. For Richmond their young back Ron McGregor was heavily involved in all of their tries. The fullbacks, Jack Magill for Richmond, and Lindsay Simons, for Marist-North Shore "both gave faultless exhibitions of fielding, and kicked with good length and direction. Magill was slightly superior in getting to the ball and running his supports into position. William Kinney scored a spectacular try using his try in the first half for Richmond. But he was injured early and carried off on a stretcher, and replaced by J Robertson.

19 September	Richmond	13-6	Marist-North Shore	Carlaw Park 1
3:00	Try: William Kinney, Henry Sale, Ron McGregor; Con: Jack Magill 2		Try: Penman, Williams	Referee: Stuart Billman

=== Stormont Shield ===
Manukau's 11-5 win saw them win the Stormont Shield for the second consecutive year after the 1941 win, which was the first in their history. V.A. Ensor a Waikato rugby player turned out for Richmond and played particularly well, while J. Inglis, a former Wairarapa rugby player debuted for Manukau and scored a try. Henry Sale "again took a prominent part in raiding". Aubrey Thompson, the former Onewhero player led the pack and handled the ball flawlessly. Steve Watene and Pita Ririnui sat out the game and Jack Brodrick played and "his colourful play found high favour with the spectators". Manukau fielded an extremely experienced back line with Ralph Martin at fullback, Butler and Tommy Chase on the wings, Joe Murray at centre three-quarter, Williams Inglis in the five eighths, along with Jack Hemi. Murray and Inglis switched places during the game. Williams Kinney on the left wing and Ron McGregor at centre-three quarter were excellent in the outside backs for Richmond. Chase's try came after he, Thompson, and Murray handled multiple times before Chase raced over.

26 September	Manukau	11-5 (6-0)	Richmond	Carlaw Park 1
3:00	Try: Tommy Chase, Aubrey Thompson, J Inglis; Pen: Jack Hemi		Try: William Kinney; Pen: Jack Magill	Referee: Jack Donovan

=== Top try scorers and point scorers ===
The try and point scoring lists were made up from the preliminary round games, the championship, Roope Rooster, and Stormont Shield games. Aubrey Thompson the Manukau hooker was the top try scorer with 16 tries with William Kinney, a Richmond winger second with 13.

Top try scorers
Rk	Player	Team	Games	Tries
1	Aubrey Thompson	Manukau	18	16
2	William Kinney	Richmond	18	13
3	Tom Butler	Manukau	15	10
4	Ray Halsey	City-Otahuhu	11	9
5	Alan Donovan	City-Otahuhu	17	8
6=	Joe Murray	Manukau	17	7
6=	K Simons	City-Otahuhu	11	7
8=	Les Clement	Newton-Mount Albert	15	6
8=	Dave McWilliams	Marist-North Shore	15	6
8=	Jack Satherley	Richmond	18	6

Top point scorers
Rk	Player	Team	G	T	C	P	DG	Pts
1	Tommy Chase	Manukau	19	3	38	19	0	123
2	Alan Donovan	City-Otahuhu	17	8	25	12	1	100
3	Roy Niwa	Newton-Mount Albert	11	2	11	11	0	50
4	Aubrey Thompson	Manukau	18	16	0	0	0	48
5	Arthur Kay	Ponsonby	8	4	9	8	0	46
6	William Kinney	Richmond	18	13	0	0	0	39
7=	Tom Butler	Manukau	15	10	0	0	0	30
7=	Basil Cranch	Newton-Mount Albert	14	4	4	5	0	30
9	C Meredith	Marist-North Shore	6	2	6	5	0	28
10	Ray Halsey	City-Otahuhu	11	9	0	0	0	27

== Other Club Matches and Lower Grades ==
=== Manukau match in Wellington ===
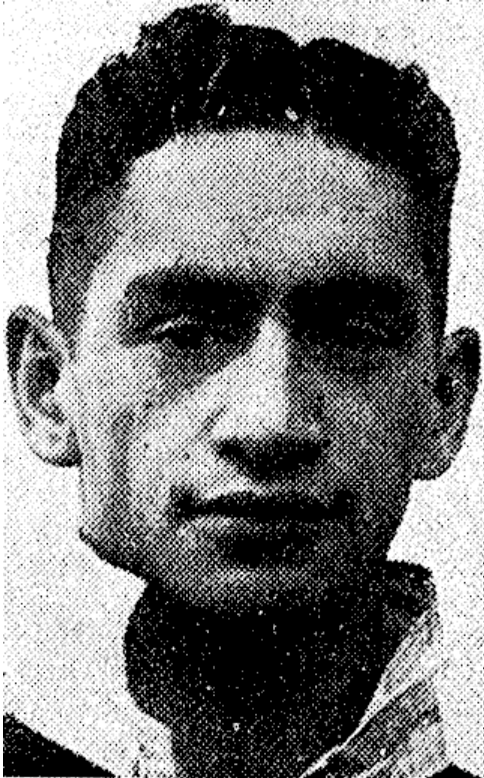
Jack Hemi scored 14 points for Manukau in their win.

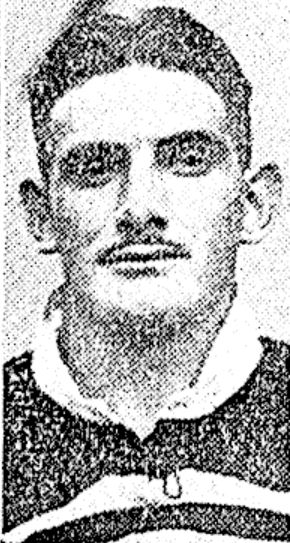
Jack Brodrick played just his second game of the season. He only played a very small number of games for Manukau from 1940 to 1944.

On September 12 Manukau played against Wellington at the Basin Reserve in Wellington. Permission for the team to travel to Wellington to play the match was initially refused before "special authority of the government" was then given. Manukau opened proceedings on a "slippery field" after a storm on Friday with a haka. They opened the game in a "breezy way" but the Wellington side put up a strong challenge and it wasn't until late in the game that the visitors secured the victory. The Manukau team was managed by Mr. H. De Wolfe. Jack Hemi apparently impressed the crowd when "right at the start he landed his kick off between the posts". He went on to score 14 points from 2 tries, 3 conversions and a penalty. Wellington had the "light but steady northerly" wind in the first half and took advantage but by half time the scores were evened up at 7-7. Wellington lost Mataira in the first half when he broke his collarbone. The best player on the field was said to be Mick Solomon, Dave Solomon's cousin, who was the star Richmond player from recent seasons. Gordon Matson captained the Wellington side and played "constructive football". He played at five eighth and halfback before he retired injured. He "learned his football at Otahuhu where he went through the grades to senior ranks". Jack Brodrick played a rare game for Manukau at this stage of his career and scored a try. Hemi played at centre-three quarter, with Joe Murray at five eighth and William Inglis at second five eighth. Inglis was said to have played a good game and was unlucky not to score. Late in the game Manukau captain Tommy Chase injured his hand and went off the field. The Dominion newspaper said that there were two balls used during the match and one was a rugby union ball which was "fatter" than a rugby league ball and the mishandling during the game could have been put down to that. The match was refereed by George Kelly from Auckland who had traveled with the side.

12 September	Wellington	**17-23 (7-7)**	Manukau	Basin Reserve, Wellington
2:45	Try: Gordon Matson, G Courtenay, R Penman; Con: Mick Solomon 2 Pen: Gordon Matson		Try: Tom Butler, Jack Hemi 2, Wiremu Te Tai, Jack Brodrick; Con: Jack Hemi 3 Pen: Jack Hemi	Referee: George Kelly

=== Lower grade sides including schools ===
There was almost no coverage whatsoever of the junior grades in 1942. With the war dominating so much of the media's attention there were no match fixtures published and no results published either aside from some Papakura results which appeared in the Franklin Times. Grades were made of the following teams with the strong possibility of additional unknown teams (winning team in bold):

- Reserve Grade:Otahuhu, City, Newton, Manukau, Richmond, and Ponsonby
- Senior B: Ellerslie, Green Lane, and City
- Third Grade: **Glenora**, Ellerslie United, Green Lane, City Rovers
- Fourth Grade: **Ellerslie United**, City Rovers, Mount Albert United, Ponsonby United
- Fifth Grade: **Richmond Rovers**, Ellerslie United, Otahuhu Rovers
- Sixth Grade: **Richmond Rovers**, Ellerslie United, Ponsonby United, Mount Albert, and Green Lane
- Seventh Grade: **Point Chevalier**, Ellerslie United, Marist Old Boys, Ponsonby United, and Green Lane. Point Chevalier won the championship with a 12 win no loss record, scoring 319 points, against just 2. Des White played for Point Chevalier side.

Schoolboys

- **Senior** (Lou Rout trophy): Ellerslie, Glenora, Green Lane, Mount Albert, Newton, Papakura, Point Chevalier, Ponsonby, and R.V.
- Intermediate: (Newport and Eccles Memorial Shield): Green Lane, Marist, Mount Albert, Papakura, Point Chevalier, and Richmond
- Junior: Green Lane, Marist, Mount Albert, Northcote, Panmure, and Papakura
- Seven-a-side: Otahuhu, Marist, Mount Albert, and Green Lane

==== Auckland Primary Schools v South Auckland Primary Schools ====
On July 11 an Auckland Primary Schools representative side took on the South Auckland (northern Waikato) primary schools side.

11 July	Auckland Primary Schools	**14-3**	South Auckland Primary Schools	Carlaw Park 1
1:45	Try: Jury 2, Mackie, Hunter; Con: Norris		Try: Berriman

On October 31 the Auckland Rugby League Schoolboys Gala took place at Carlaw Park. A match was played between an A and B team with the A team winning 8 points to 3. The Otahuhu Workshops Band provided music during the day. Running races were held during the event along with a goal kicking competition which was won by Pitcher of Pt Chevalier (Senior), Roy Moore of Green Lane (Intermediate), and Scudder of Panmure (Junior). Other events included a tug-of-war, and relays. Roy Moore would later play for New Zealand from 1952 to 56.

== Representative season ==
The Auckland team was selected by A. J. McGregor, Bill Cloke, and Stan Prentice, and was managed by James (Jim) Clark.

On August 22 Auckland named a junior representative team to play against a South Auckland (northern Waikato) representative side. It was: Lake, and F Johnstone (Mt Albert), Jones, W Smith, and Dracevitch (Glenora), Jack Osborne, Fielder, Harkness, and Nugent (Green Lane), Price, B Simpson, and Granich (Ellerslie), Ryan, and Barnes (Pt Chevalier), and Godfrey, and Redfern (Avondale).

=== Auckland v South Auckland (Waikato) ===
The crowd for the match was described as the largest of the season to that point. In addition to the 13 who played for Auckland the following players were named reserves: William Kinney (Richmond), Dave McWilliams (Marist), Pita Ririnui (Manukau), and W Findlater (City). Future New Zealand international Ron McGregor was on representative debut aged just 18. Hawea Mataira was initially named in the Auckland starting side but was unable to play and Pita Ririnui took his place. Tommy Chase captained the Auckland team.

11 July	Auckland	49-16	South Auckland	Carlaw Park 1
3:00	Try: Ron McGregor, Ray Halsey, Tommy Chase, Joe Murray 4, Leo Davis, Aubrey Thompson 2, George Shilton; Con: Tommy Chase 8		Try: O Brooks, J Connolly; Con: O Brooks 2 Pen: O Brooks	Referee: Stuart Billman

=== Auckland Māori (Tāmaki) v Auckland Pākehā ===
The now annual match between Auckland Māori and Auckland Pākēha was played at Carlaw Park on August 29. The proceeds went to the injured player fund.

29 August	Auckland Māori	10-8	Auckland Pākēha	Carlaw Park 1
3:00	Try: Tom Butler, Aubrey Thompson; Con: Jack Hemi 2		Try: William Kinney, Arthur Kay; Con: Alan Donovan	Referee: Jack Hawkes

=== Auckland Māori (Tāmaki) v Auckland Pākehā ===
The return match was played on October 5 and saw a high-scoring draw. A curtain-raiser was played between Green Lane and Glenora and saw a player, Colin Campbell concussed and taken to Auckland Hospital. A day after his condition was described as "fair".

5 October	Auckland Māori (Tāmaki)	23-23	Auckland Pākehā	Carlaw Park 1
3:00	Try: Steve Watene, Pita Ririnui, Aubrey Thompson 2, George Shilton; Con: Jack Hemi 4		Try: William Kinney, Williams, Arthur Kay, Leo Davis, Dick Hull; Con: Arthur Kay 2 Pen: Arthur Kay 2	Referee: Lieutenant Jack Donovan

=== Unofficial representative match (All Golds v Māori XIII) ===
On October 17 a team named the All Golds played against a Māori XIII side. The All Golds team was essentially the M.T.P (Military Transport Pool) side which won the Gallaher Shield. Efforts had been made for the M.T.P. side to play Richmond a week prior but the Auckland Rugby Union said the match would not be possible and it was ultimately cancelled. As the team was made up almost entirely of rugby league players (with several Kiwis) they formed an unofficial team to play a Māori side. The Māori team was made up largely of the Auckland Māori side. The match was played at Western Springs and as it was not being played under the auspices of the Auckland Rugby League a makeshift referee was needed, which turned out to be Arthur Kay.

17 October	All Golds	18-9 (8-6)	Māori XIII	Western Springs Stadium
3:00	Try: Ivan Gregory, James Silva, George Mitchell 2 Con: Bob Scott 3		Try: Joe Murray, Wiremu Te Tai 2	Referee: Arthur Kay

=== Auckland representative matches played and scorers ===
No	Name	Club Team	Play	Tries	Con	Pen	Points
1	Tommy Chase	Manukau	1	1	8	0	19
2	Joe Murray	Manukau	1	4	0	0	12
3	Aubrey Thompson	Manukau	1	2	0	0	6
4	Leo Davis	Richmond	1	1	0	0	3
4	Ray Halsey	City-Otahuhu	1	1	0	0	3
4	Ron McGregor	Richmond	1	1	0	0	3
4	George Shilton	Manukau	1	1	0	0	3
8	Tom Butler	Manukau	1	0	0	0	0
8	Norm Johnson	City-Otahuhu	1	0	0	0	0
8	Ralph Martin	Manukau	1	0	0	0	0
8	Maurice Quirke	Newton-Mt Albert	1	0	0	0	0
8	Pita Ririnui	Manukau	1	0	0	0	0
8	C.W. Williams	Richmond	1	0	0	0	0

=== Auckland Māori representative matches played and scorers ===
No	Name	Club Team	Play	Tries	Con	Pen	Points
1	Jack Hemi	Manukau	2	0	6	0	12
1	Aubrey Thompson	Manukau	2	3	0	0	9
1	Tom Butler	Manukau	2	1	0	0	3
1	Pita Ririnui	Manukau	2	1	0	0	3
1	George Shilton	Manukau	2	1	0	0	3
1	Steve Watene	Manukau	1	1	0	0	3
1	Tommy Chase	Manukau	2	0	0	0	0
1	Jack Major	Manukau	2	0	0	0	0
1	Joe Murray	Manukau	2	0	0	0	0
1	Nikaere	Manukau	2	0	0	0	0
1	J Rapana	Manukau	2	0	0	0	0
1	J Sullivan	Ponsonby	2	0	0	0	0
1	Wiremu Te Tai	Manukau	2	0	0	0	0
1	Fleet	Manukau	1	0	0	0	0
1	Ralph Martin	Manukau	1	0	0	0	0
1	Hawea Mataira	City-Otahuhu	1	0	0	0	0
1	Jack McLeod	Richmond	1	0	0	0	0

=== Auckland Pākēha representative matches played and scorers ===
No	Name	Club Team	Play	Tries	Con	Pen	Points
1	Arthur Kay	Ponsonby	2	2	2	2	14
1	William Kinney	Richmond	2	2	0	0	6
1	Leo Davis	Richmond	2	1	0	0	3
1	Dick Hull	Ponsonby	2	1	0	0	3
1	Des Williams	Ponsonby	1	1	0	0	3
1	Alan Donovan	City-Otahuhu	1	0	1	0	2
1	Eugene Donovan	City-Otahuhu	2	0	0	0	0
1	Norm Johnson	City-Otahuhu	2	0	0	0	0
1	Jack Magill	Richmond	2	0	0	0	0
1	Don McLeod	Marist	2	0	0	0	0
1	Ron McGregor	Richmond	2	0	0	0	0
1	Roy Nurse	Ponsonby	2	0	0	0	0
1	Len Jordan	Ponsonby	1	0	0	0	0
1	C Williams	Richmond	1	0	0	0	0

== Annual General Meetings and Club News ==
=== Auckland Rugby League Junior Management Committee ===
They held their annual meeting in the Auckland Rugby League rooms on Courthouse Lane on Tuesday, March 31 at 8 pm. Mr. E. Chapman was elected chairman and the present board was re-elected. The junior control board appointed the following officers:- Chairman, Mr. E. Chapman, deputy chairman, Mr. C. Howe, secretary, Mr. W. F. Clarke, Mr. Chapman was appointed as delegate to the senior board. The junior control board resolved at its weekly meeting prior to the start of the season to increase the weights in all junior grades by 5lb at weighing in with no restriction on normal growth of players during the season. This was considered a war time measure designed to meet clubs wishes. The age restrictions in all grades would remain unaltered.

=== Auckland Rugby League Primary School Management Committee ===
Nominations were received for 36 schoolboy teams and four seven-a-side teams. Forty eight footballs were presented to the schoolboy committee.

=== Auckland Rugby League Referees Association ===
The Auckland referees elected Mr. A. C. Gallagher as their representative on the Referees Appointment Board. At the April 15 board meeting the Referees’ Association advised that Mr. M. Renton had been elected as deputy to Mr. Percy Rogers on the Referees’ Appointments Board. Mr. T. Carey was appointed the junior representative on the referees appointment committee.

=== Avondale Rugby League Football Club ===
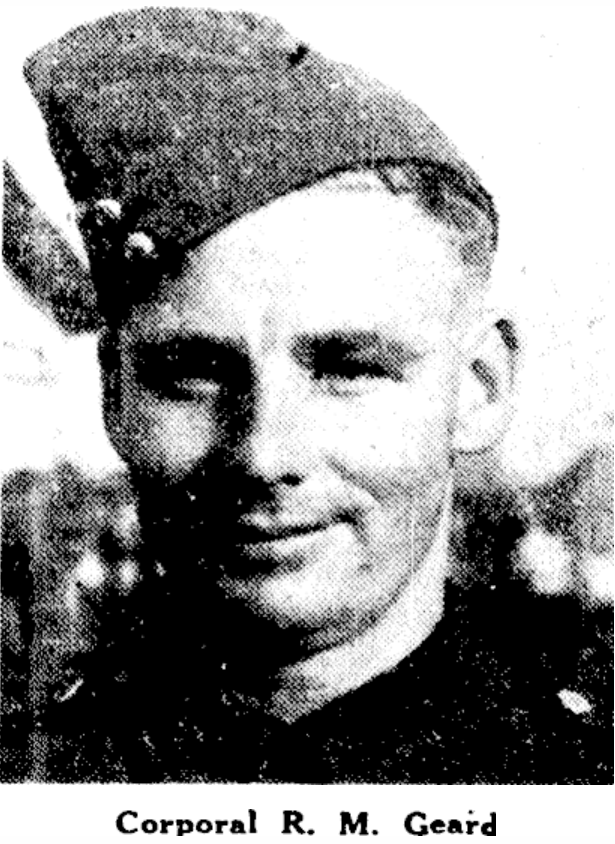

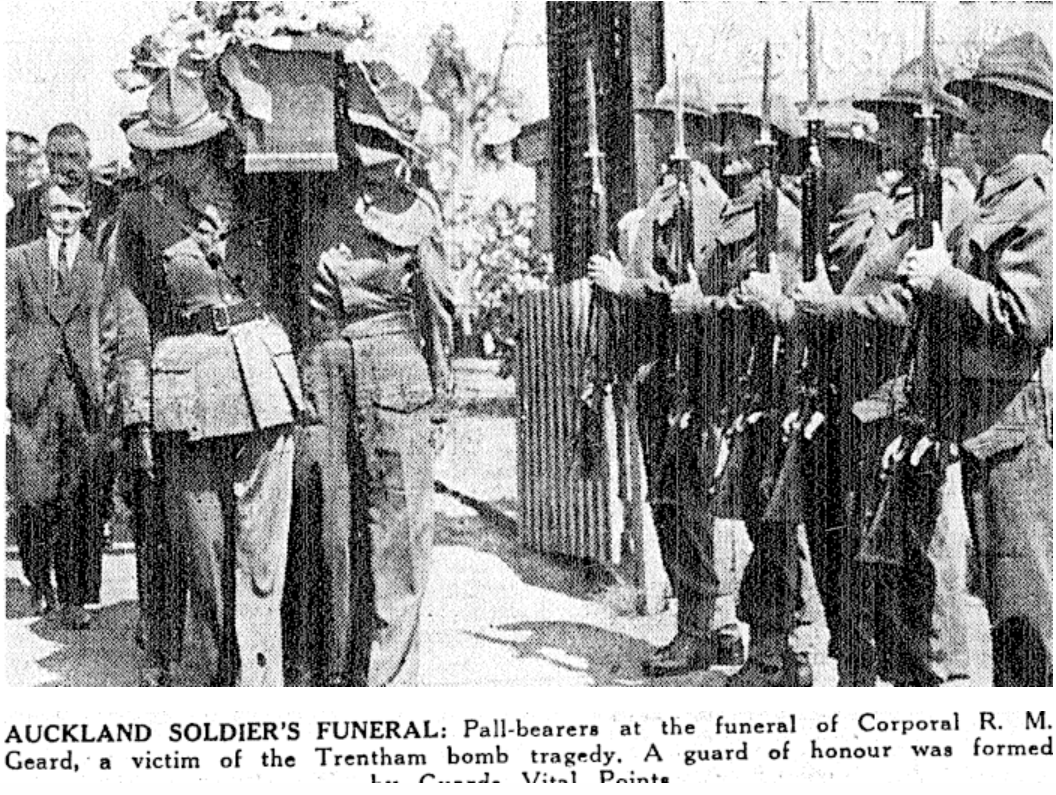

On February 7, Avondale junior player, Richard Mark Geard was killed accidentally by a bomb explosion at Trentham Military Camp after he had been a member of the territorials for four months. He was at the Army School of Instruction at Trentham and on a special course after being called to service by ballot. His death occurred during a demonstration being given to a class of officers and non-commissioned officers undergoing instruction in the practical use of bombs. A bomb which had had its fuse lit was about to be thrown when it detonated. Four men were killed instantly including Geard, 4 were seriously injured with one dying later, and eight others injured. He was buried at Waikumete Cemetery in Glen Eden, Auckland. He was aged just 19 at the time of his death. The club held their annual meeting on Wednesday, April 15 in the Labour Party Rooms on St George's Road at 8 pm. Their secretary was H. W. Green.

=== City Rovers Football Club ===
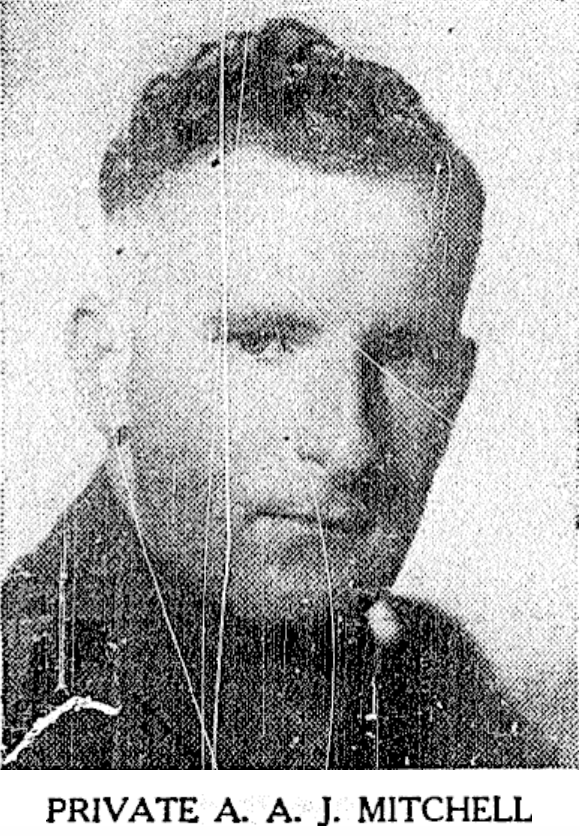

It was reported on January 21, 1942, that Private William Vuglar who was initially reported missing had in fact been captured and was a prisoner of war. He was a member of the City rugby league club. Vuglar had been captured on December 13, 1941, and was held at the Prisoner of War – Stalag VIII-B (later 344) camp in Lamsdorf, Poland. In March it was reported that Private Andrew Albert James Mitchell had been killed in the Middle East. He was 24 years of age and had played for the City Rovers club for about six years prior to his departure for war. His death occurred on December 5, 1941, in the sinking of the SS Chakdina. The ship was carrying 380 wounded, including 97 New Zealanders from Tobruk Harbour. At 9 pm an enemy plane dropped a torpedo into one of its after holds and the ship sank in 3 1/2 minutes. Around 400 on board were killed, including some German and Italian POWs. City Rovers held their annual meeting at the Auckland Rugby League rooms at Courthouse Lane on Tuesday, 24 March at 7:30 pm. Their secretary Ernie Asher advertised the meeting. City held a practice for all grades at 3 pm at Carlaw Park on April 11 and advertised that future trainings would be on Tuesday and Thursday evenings.

=== Ellerslie United Football Club ===
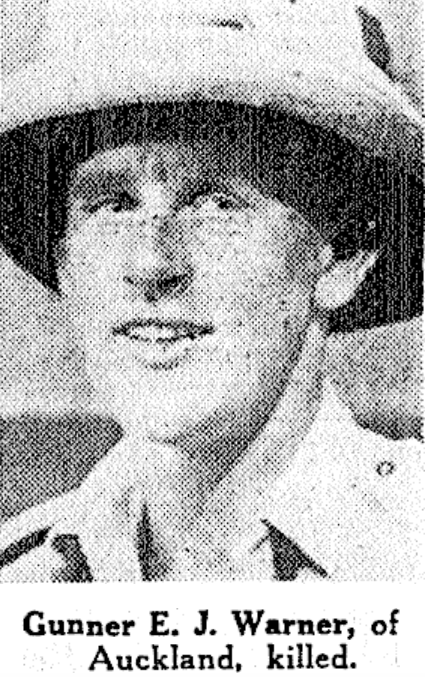

It was reported on January 12 that Ernest John Warner had been killed in the Western Desert campaign in North Africa on December 1, 1941. He was a member of the Ellerslie club and was part of the fifth grade side which won the 1939 knock-out competition. He died the day before his 22nd birthday. Ellerslie held their annual meeting on Thursday, March 19 at 8 pm at the Parish Hall in Ellerslie. At their annual meeting it was noted that they had 21 members on active service. Tribute was paid to the memory of Private Gordon Bert Osborne and Gunner E. J. Osborne, who had been killed in action. Gordon had been killed on December 1, 1941, in the Western Desert campaign, North Africa. He was buried at Knightsbridge War Cemetery, Acroma, Libya. Their annual report reviewed the performances of their six grade sides with special reference being made to their senior B side and their seventh grade side. The later team won the championship and knockout and were presented with caps by Mr. T. Kane who represented the junior control board. Mr. George Chapman, a life member was also in attendance. Their honorary secretary was Mr. G. Whaley. They held a training for all grades at the Ellerslie Reserve on Saturday, April 11 at 2 pm.

It was reported on November 2 that Arthur Gibson Osborne had received a commission in the R.N.Z.A.F. and been posted to the Middle East. He was an Ellerslie league player. His only brother Private Gordon Osborne, who had also played for Ellerslie, was killed in December 1941 in the first Libyan battle.

=== Glenora Rugby League Football Club ===
Glenora held their annual meeting on Monday, March 30 at the Toc H Hall. G Malam was acting secretary.

=== Green Lane Football Club ===
Green Lane held their annual meeting at their headquarters in Green Lane on Wednesday, March 25 at 7:30 pm.

=== Manukau Rugby League Football Club ===
On January 12, Harold Lancelot Hughes died aged 53. He was originally a rugby player for Parnell in his younger years before becoming involved with the Manukau rugby league club where he became a selector, and then later a referee. He was working at the Railway Department in Onehunga, where he lived at the time of his death. Manukau advertised their annual meeting for Monday, March 16 at 7:45 pm at the Training Shed on Galway Street in Onehunga. On May 19 Manukau called a meeting at their Training Shed on Galway Street to elect a secretary-treasurer.

=== Marist Brothers League Football Club ===
On Thursday the 19th of March, Marist held their annual meeting at the Auckland Rugby League clubrooms on Courthouse Lane. The notice was advertised by their honorary secretary Jack Kirwan. Marist held a practice at Carlaw Park on Saturday, April 11 at 2 pm.

=== Mount Albert League Football Club ===
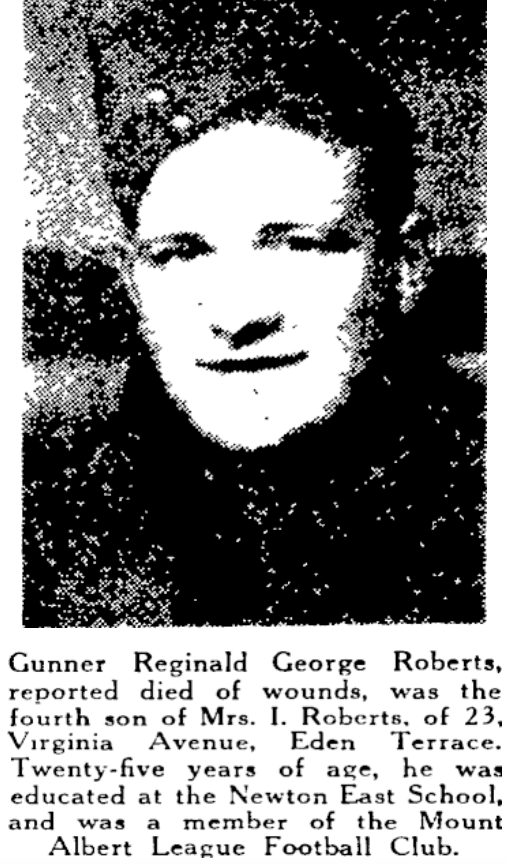

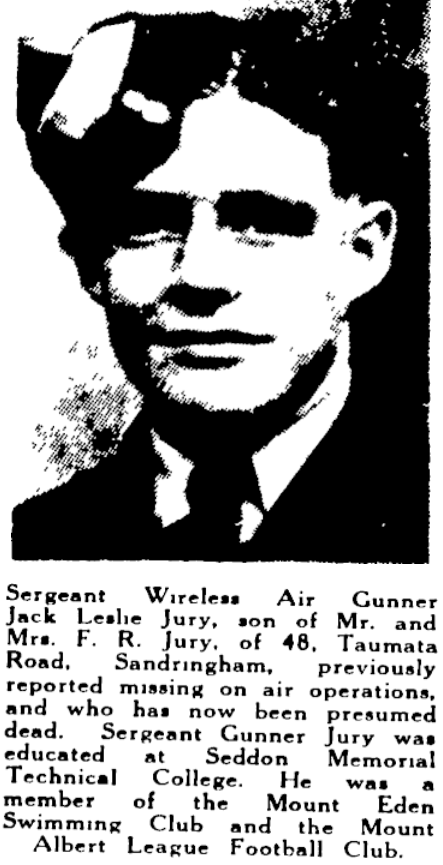

Mount Albert announced their annual meeting for March 23 at the King George Hall in Mt Albert at 7:30 pm. Mt Albert's former captain, Martin Hansen was welcomed back from war in the Middle East at the board of control meeting on April 1. On May 21 Mount Albert held a special meeting of members and players at the Pavilion Fowlds Park, Morningside for the purpose of forming a committee to carry on the activities of the club. Mr. B. Brigham was the president of the club. On the 21st of July it was reported that Gunner Reginald George Roberts had died from wounds in the war. He had been educated at Newton East School and was a member of the Mount Albert rugby league club. He was a gunner in the 14 Light Anti-Aircraft Regiment and was killed on July 5, 1942, at the age of 25 in the Western Desert campaign, North Africa. Roberts was buried at El Alamein War Cemetery, Egypt. On August 22 the Mount Albert club advertised in the newspaper: “will relatives or friends of members of the Mt. Albert Rugby League Club who are prisoners of war kindly send addresses to the Sec., Mr. F. W. Clement, 168 Blockhouse Bay Rd., Avondale”.

It was reported in September that former Mount Albert player Jack Leslie Jury, who had previously been reported missing in action was now presumed dead. He had gone missing while on air operation on August 12, 1942. Jury's rank had been a Sergeant Gunner, and was educated at Seddon Memorial Technical College. He was aged 20 at the time of his death and was memorialised at Jonkerbos War Cemetery, Gelderland, Netherlands.

=== Newton Rangers League Football Club ===
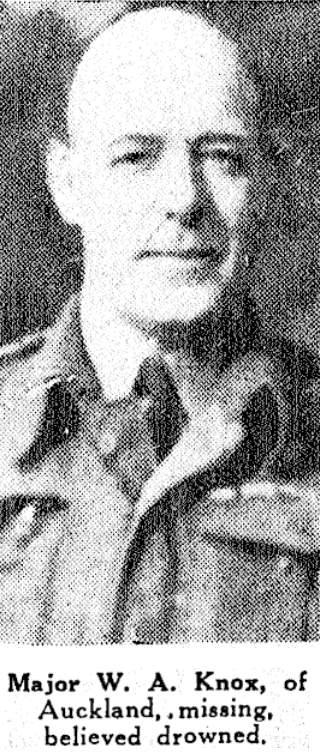

On January 5 it was reported that Newton member, Major William Andrew Knox was "wounded and missing". It was later found that he had died on December 5, 1941. He was serving with the New Zealand Artillery, 7 Anti Tank Regiment at the time of his death. He had also served in World War I and was aged 48. His death occurred due to the sinking of the SS Chakdina. The ship was carrying 380 wounded, including 97 New Zealanders such as Knox from Tobruk Harbour. At 9 pm an enemy plane dropped a torpedo into one of its after holds and the ship sank in 3 and a half minutes. Around 400 on board were killed, including some German and Italian POWs. The sinking also claimed the life of Andrew Mitchell of the City Rovers club. Knox had served in the Field Artillery in World War 1. In 1941 Knox was transferred into the New Zealand Ordnance Corps as the officer commanding of the NZ Divisional Ordnance Field Park and was granted the rank of temporary major. He was injured after driving over a land mine and admitted to a casualty clearing station on 29 November 1941. Only 18 of the New Zealanders on board survived with all those remaining presumed drowned. The Newton Rangers 32nd annual meeting was scheduled for Monday, March 16 at 7:45 pm at the Auckland Rugby League rooms in Grey's Building, Courthouse Lane.

=== North Shore Albions League Football Club ===
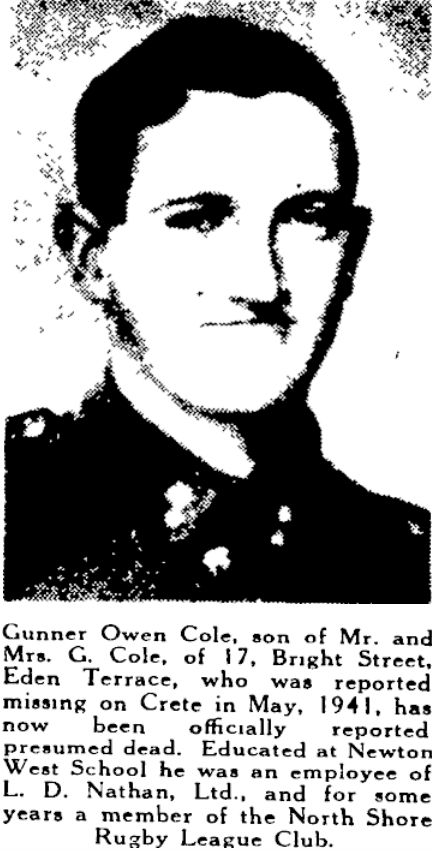
Owen Cole

In September 1942 it was reported that Owen Cole, who had been reported missing was now officially presumed dead. He had in fact been killed the year prior on September 4, 1941. He worked for Newton West School, and worked for L.D. Nathan Ltd. and was "for some years a member of the North Shore Albions club. Cole had been captured as a prisoner of war on June 1, 1941. In biographical notes on his Auckland Museum Cenotaph page it was stated: "Owen Cole was the son of George Henry Leonard and Elizabeth Jane Cole, of Auckland City, New Zealand. The youngest of seven children, Owen Cole grew up in Eden Terrace. He was considered quiet and reserved, partly because he was born with a cleft palate and did not always speak clearly.

He was killed by the German Troops on his third breakout from a prison camp on the Greek Island of Crete. According to family members, the German army had told Gunner Cole that if he tried to escape again they would shoot him. In September 1941, Pte Cole, Pte Blank (23 Bn) and four other soldiers after escaping from POW Camp were surrounded by German troops. They surrendered, but were lined up and two were killed; one of whom was Cole, the other is unknown. His diary was found in the 1990s among thousands of wartime documents unearthed in a Moscow vault. The documents were apparently seized by Josef Stalin's Red Army when it invaded Nazi Germany. The diary ends two weeks after Gunner Cole and a friend first escaped from the Crete Prison. His five war medals were given to Owen's oldest sister, Myrtle".

It was reported on January 3 that a former North Shore junior player, Private Ernest Henry Leaity of the 21st Auckland Battalion had been killed in action. He had been killed on December 1, 1941, in the Western Desert campaign in North Africa. He was buried at Knightsbridge War Cemetery in Acroma, Libya. He grew up in Devonport and was memorialised on Lake Road in that suburb.

North Shore Albions held their annual meeting at Buffalo Hall, Devonport on March 5 at 8 pm. North Shore advertised their first practice for all grades in mid April, and their senior coach was once again Allan Seagar with M. W. Coghlan as the honorary secretary. North Shore called for a special meeting of players and committee at their Football Shed in Devonport at 7:30 pm on Monday the 15th of June to discuss the amalgamation with Marist Old Boys.

=== Otahuhu Rugby League Football Club ===
Otahuhu held their annual meeting at their training shed on Fairburn Rd in Otahuhu on Tuesday, March 18 at 7:45 pm. M. Ritchie was their honorary secretary for the season.

=== Papakura Rugby League Football Club ===
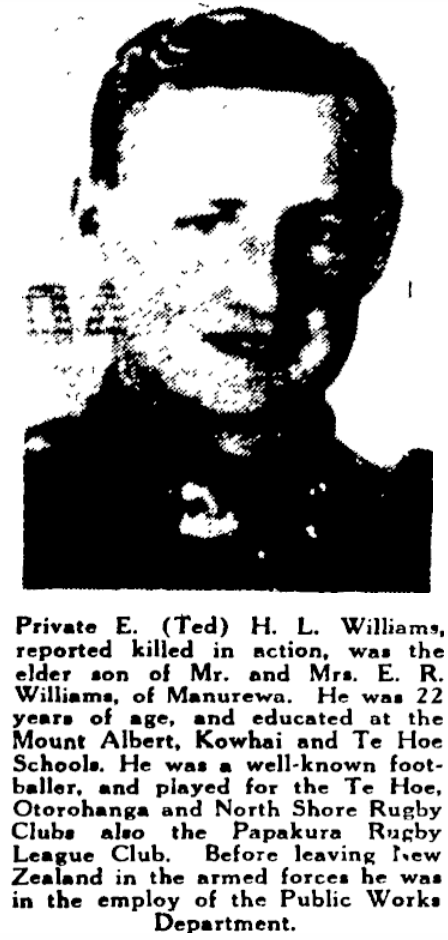

In late January it was reported that Papakura senior B player Lance-Corporal Robert Leslie Gibson, who had been reported killed in action on November 26 was in fact a prisoner of war. He had been captured on December 13 with the 24th Battalion, and was held prisoner at the Prisoner Of War camp in Salonike, Greece, and then Stalag VIII-B in Łambinowice, Germany, and later P.G. 103, Treviso, Italy. He was an employee of the Ōtāhuhu workshops. The Papakura club advertised that their annual general meeting would be held in the Scout Hall, Papakura on Monday, 9 March. At their annual meeting in April it was reported that the club was in a strong financial position. Due to the “war conditions the club decided to concentrate its efforts on running the lower grades and schoolboys’ teams”. Their report stated that 80 members were in the armed forces. The following officers were elected:- Patron, Mr. H. A. Pollock; president, Mr. L. McVeigh; vice presidents, last years re-elected; treasurer, Mr. N. G. Topp; executive, Messrs. W. Leighton, A. Hill, A. Gyde, A. Scharbeger, W. Lacassie, R. Bates, A. Burgess, E. Clarke, F. Osborne; secretary to be elected by committee. The club also decided to place its social rooms at the disposal of the Emergency Precaution Service in case of emergency. In May the Papakura club applied for the use of Prince Edward Park with the secretary stating in a letter to the Papakura Borough Council that the club intended on confining its activities to schoolboy football only. The council therefore reduced their ground fees from £10 to £5. On June 15 it was reported that the Papakura club had asked to “cancel the application for the use of the playing area on Prince Edward Park. We have been granted permission to play on the local school ground”, so stated Mr. A. L. Lewis, the honorary secretary of the club in a letter to the Papakura Borough Council. It went on to say that “owing to transport difficulties all schoolboy teams have to travel by train and the school ground is more convenient”. He thanked the council for “past consideration, and added that the club hoped to have the privilege of playing on the park again when conditions became normal”. The council agreed to the cancellation.

On July 15 it was reported that Private E. (Ted) H. L. Williams had been killed in action. He was 22 years of age. He had been educated at Kowhai School in Mount Albert, and Te Hoe School in Ōtorohanga. He had played rugby for the North Shore club in Auckland and also for the Papakura rugby league club. He was part of the 24 Infantry Battalion and was killed in action on June 28 in the Western Desert, North Africa. Williams was buried at El Alamein War Cemetery, Egypt. On the evening of July 31 a recreation hut was opened in Papakura with the Mayor of Auckland, Mr. J. A. C. Allum in attendance and the Mayor of Papakura, Mr. S. Evans presiding. The hut had been fitted with a billiards table, writing tables and various games. A piano was lent for the duration of the war by the Papakura Rugby League Club.

=== Point Chevalier Rugby League Football Club ===
On April 7 they held their annual meeting at the Social Club Hall on Point Chevalier Road at 6 pm. They announced practice for all grades on April 18 at 2 pm at Walker Park. Their honorary secretary was A. G. Daniels. On June 2 it was reported that Stanley (Stan) George of Grey Lynn had gained his commission as pilot officer in the R.A.F.. He had been educated at Grey Lynn School and Seddon Memorial Technical College. He played rugby league for the Point Chevalier club and left for the war aged 23 in 1941. In a match at Walker Park in Point Chevalier on June 20 a 17-year-old player, Noel Mitchell was admitted to Auckland Hospital after suffering a concussion injury during a match. His condition was not listed as serious that evening.

=== Ponsonby United Football Club ===
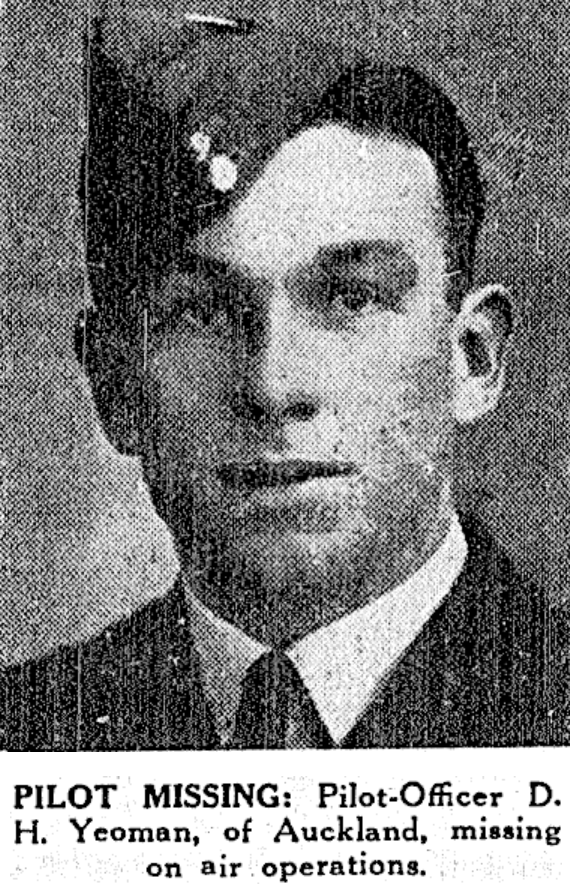

In March it was reported that Pilot-Officer Dallas Harley Yeoman was missing as a result of air operations in the Middle East. He had been educated at Ponsonby School and the Seddon Memorial Technical College. He played for the Ponsonby senior reserves in 1936 and 1937 before moving to Wellington. He was not killed however and at the completion of the war he enlisted in the Jayforce and served there until 1948. On June 16 Ponsonby notified the board that its junior schoolboys and seven-a-side teams were being coached by a woman and suggested that this was "perhaps unique in the world of sport".

=== Richmond Rovers Football Club ===
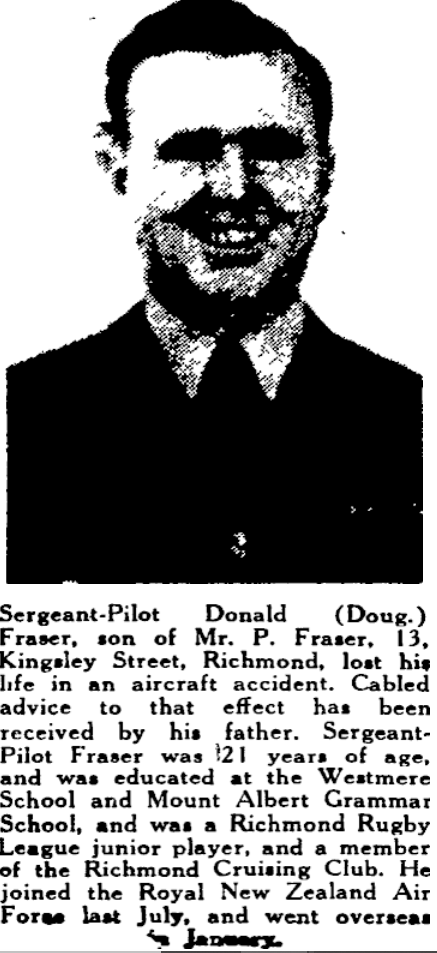

In February it was reported that former senior player Keith Walker Fletcher had been promoted to the rank of sub-lieutenant in the Navy. He played for the senior side from 1936 to 1939 after moving to Auckland from Palmerston North. He was the brother of Eric Fletcher who also played for Richmond, and New Zealand. The Richmond club advertised their annual meeting to be held at their club rooms in Grey Lynn Park on Tuesday, March 10 at 7:45 pm. It was reported in June that Sergeant-Pilot Donald (Doug) Fraser lost his life in an aircraft accident. He was 22 years of age and had been a Richmond junior. He had joined the Royal New Zealand Air Force in July 1941 and went overseas in January. He was killed on June 12. Fraser was buried at Carlisle Cemetery, Cumberland, England.

On October 23 it was reported that Sergeant Pilot Andrew Kronfeld, aged 24 was promoted to the rank of pilot officer. At the time he was serving with a fighter unit in India. He had been educated at Mount Albert Grammar School and later played rugby for Ponsonby before joining the Richmond club where he played for their senior side prior to his enlistment.

== Transfers and registrations ==
On 3 June at the board meeting an application was received from the Wellington League to transfer Harold Milliken, the ex-All Black and New Zealand league representative from the Papakura club to Petone. The transfer was granted pending New Zealand Rugby League's permission.
