= 1929 Dunedin mayoral election =

Local election in New Zealand

- 1 May 1929
- Turnout: 15,625
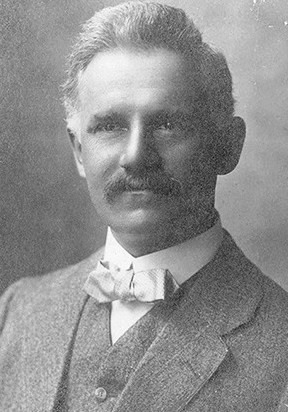

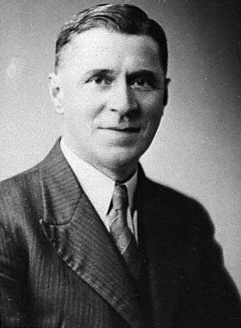
Candidate	Robert Black	Charles Hayward	Fred Jones
Party	Citizens'	Independent	Labour
Popular vote	5,701	4,792	3,811
Percentage	36.48	30.66	24.39
Mayor before election
William Taverner
Elected mayor
Robert Black

The 1929 Dunedin mayoral election was part of the New Zealand local elections held that same year. In 1929, elections were held for the Mayor of Dunedin plus other local government positions including twelve city councillors. The polling was conducted using the standard first-past-the-post electoral method.

== Mayoral results ==
1929 Dunedin mayoral election
Party	Candidate	Votes	%	±%
Citizens'	Robert Black	5,701	36.48	
Independent	Charles Henry Hayward	4,792	30.66	
Labour	Fred Jones	3,811	24.39	
Independent	John McDonald	1,321	8.45	
Majority		909	5.81	
Turnout		15,625		

== Council results ==
1929 Dunedin local election
Party	Candidate	Votes	%	±%
Citizens'	James Clark	7,562	48.39	
Citizens'	John Shacklock	7,123	45.58	
Labour	Jim Munro	7,029	44.98	
Citizens'	Frank Leonard Lawrence	6,704	42.90	
Citizens'	Walter Alexander Scott	6,517	41.70	
Citizens'	Francis William Mitchell	6,235	39.90	
Citizens'	Harold Tapley	6,154	39.38	
Independent	Herbert Cecil Campbell	6,032	38.60	
Citizens'	John Wilson	5,923	37.90	
Citizens'	James Marlow	5,568	35.63	
Citizens'	Frank Wilkinson	5,272	33.74	
Independent	William Begg	5,219	33.40	
Citizens'	Adam David Edgar	4,997	31.98	
Citizens'	Charles Robert Smith	4,978	31.85	
Independent	David Larnach	4,713	30.16	
Citizens'	Patrick Leith Ritchie	4,480	28.67	
Labour	Arthur Paape	3,985	25.50	
Independent	Fred William Knight	3,848	24.62	
Independent	Edwin Sincock	3,814	24.40	
Labour	John Robinson	3,408	21.81	
Labour	Ralph Harrison	3,381	21.63	
Independent	George P. Cuttriss	3,190	20.41	
Labour	Peter Neilson	2,733	17.49	
Labour	William Batchelor	2,691	17.22	
Independent	Cornelius Machin Moss	2,328	14.89	
Labour	George Sinclair Geddes	2,317	14.82	
Labour	Mark Silverstone	2,303	14.73	
Labour	Alexander John Morison	2,168	13.87	
Labour	Alice Herbert	2,100	13.44	
Independent	Daniel Minnock	1,923	12.30	
Labour	Brian O'Donnell	1,884	12.05	
Independent	Arthur James Rice	1,856	11.87	
Labour	William George Cocking	1,720	11.00	
Independent	H. Walton Phillips	985	6.30	
