= 1947 Dunedin mayoral election =

Local election in New Zealand

- 19 November 1947
- Turnout: 32,323 (65.11%)
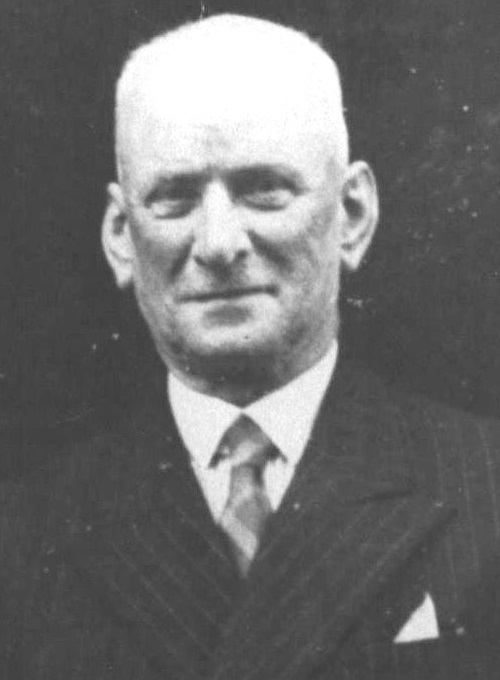

Candidate	Donald Cameron	Ernest Frederick Jones
Party	Citizens'	Labour
Popular vote	22,151	10,049
Percentage	68.53	31.08
Mayor before election
Donald Cameron
Elected mayor
Donald Cameron

The 1947 Dunedin mayoral election was part of the New Zealand local elections held that same year. In 1947, elections were held for the Mayor of Dunedin plus other local government positions including twelve city councillors. The polling was conducted using the standard first-past-the-post electoral method.

Donald Cameron, the incumbent Mayor was elected to serve a second term. He defeated his sole opponent Ernest Frederick Jones of the Labour Party who was a returned prisoner of war and the eldest son of Fred Jones, the Minister of Defence. In addition, the Citizens' Association won all twelve seats on the city council.

== Mayoral results ==
1947 Dunedin mayoral election
Party	Candidate	Votes	%	±%
Citizens'	Donald Cameron	22,151	68.53	+17.79
Labour	Ernest Frederick Jones	10,049	31.08	
Informal votes		123	0.38	−0.33
Majority		12,102	37.44	+35.24
Turnout		32,323	65.11	−5.05

== Council results ==
1947 Dunedin local election
Party	Candidate	Votes	%	±%
Citizens'	Eric Anderson	17,412	53.86	
Citizens'	Len Wright	17,404	53.84	+6.19
Citizens'	Robert Forsyth-Barr	16,974	52.51	+4.35
Citizens'	Charlie Hayward	16,901	52.28	+5.34
Citizens'	William Taverner	16,805	51.99	+4.80
Citizens'	David Charles Jolly	16,785	51.92	+9.91
Citizens'	Norman Douglas Anderson	16,751	51.82	
Citizens'	Jim Barnes	16,665	51.55	
Citizens'	Leonard James Tobin Ireland	16,503	51.05	+3.17
Citizens'	Stuart Sidey	16,305	50.44	
Citizens'	William Stewart Armitage	16,159	49.99	+2.75
Citizens'	Edmund J. Smith	15,680	48.51	+1.64
Labour	Phil Connolly	15,674	48.49	−2.92
Labour	Gervan McMillan	15,361	47.52	−2.31
Labour	Robert Walls	14,719	45.53	−8.60
Labour	Wally Hudson	14,606	45.18	−1.92
Labour	Michael Connelly	14,566	45.06	−2.05
Labour	Meynell Blain	14,227	44.01	−5.19
Labour	Ethel McMillan	13,722	42.45	
Labour	David Copland	13,114	40.57	
Labour	William Robert Clarke	12,931	40.00	−4.59
Labour	Richard Lindsay Cotton	12,597	38.97	
Labour	Edwin Carradine Stanton	12,523	38.74	
Labour	William Benedict Richards	11,594	35.86	−7.83
Independent	Robert Bell Middlemiss	2,499	7.73	−3.91
Communist	Samuel Ikin	1,743	5.39	
