= Fred Jones (New Zealand politician) =

New Zealand politician

The Honourable Fred Jones
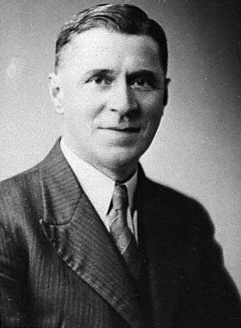
- Jones in 1935

19th Minister of Defence
- In office 6 December 1935 – 13 December 1949
- Prime Minister: Michael Joseph Savage; Peter Fraser
- Preceded by: John Cobbe
- Succeeded by: Tom Macdonald

31st Postmaster-General
- In office 6 December 1935 – 1 April 1940
- Prime Minister: Michael Joseph Savage
- Preceded by: Adam Hamilton
- Succeeded by: Paddy Webb

Member of Parliament for St Kilda Dunedin South (1931–1946)
- In office 2 December 1931 – 1 September 1951
- Preceded by: William Taverner
- Succeeded by: Jim Barnes

Personal details
- Born: Charles Frederick Benney Dunshea; 16 November 1884 Dunedin, New Zealand
- Died: 25 May 1966 (aged 81) Dunedin, New Zealand
- Spouse: Jessie Agnes Hudson
- Relations: Wally Hudson (brother-in-law)
- Children: 3
- Profession: Cobbler

Frederick Jones (born Charles Frederick Benney Dunshea; 16 November 1884 – 25 May 1966) was a New Zealand trade unionist, Member of Parliament and the Defence Minister during World War II. His biographer stated that Jones "...symbolised the ordinary Labour man: modest, hard working, patient, tolerant, and above all, loyal."

== Biography ==
=== Early life and career ===
Jones was born Charles Frederick Benney Dunshea in Dunedin on 16 November 1884. His mother then married Charles Jones in 1890. He first entered trade aged 14 in 1898 as a draper. Three years later he became an apprentice bootmaker. In 1910 he married Jessie Agnes Hudson with whom he had three sons. That same year, after finishing his apprenticeship, he joined Messrs Sargood, Son and Ewen Ltd. as a boot clicker. He worked there for 21 years until his election to Parliament.

During this time he became a trade unionist, joining the Bootmakers' Union for over 30 years. He worked his way up the union hierarchy and eventually became president of the union. He was also secretary of the Employees' Sick Benefit Society. In 1912 he joined the Otago Trades Council (of which he served as president three times) and became a member of the Dunedin branch of the first Labour Party. Jones proved to be a middle-of-the-roader Labour member, wanting change but not radicalism. He was an acolyte of Tom Paul, the most prominent unionist in Otago and followed him into the re-modeled Labour Party upon its formation in 1916. In 1928 he was appointed by the government as a member of the Footwear Inquiry Committee. He was also a member of the Workers' Educational Association and served as its dominion president.

=== Local-body politics ===
Jones unsuccessfully contested the Mayoralty of Dunedin as the Labour candidate in 1929. In 1933 he was elected a member of the Dunedin City Council, holding a seat until 1937 when he resigned following his appointment as a Cabinet Minister. From 1935 he had been the deputy mayor.

During the Great Depression Jones was chairman of the tramways committee. On the council he fought for various proposals, but following his elevation to Cabinet he was unable to play as active a role in local affairs as he wished. The 1935 election resulted in a Labour majority on the council, however many of the councillors who were also MPs and became unable to effectively fulfil their civic duties. Between March 1936 and March 1937 Jones was able to attend only two percent of council and committee meetings leading him to resign that December.

His eldest son Ernest Frederick Jones, a returned prisoner of war, stood as the Labour Party candidate for Mayor of Dunedin at the 1947 local elections. However he was beaten convincingly by incumbent Donald Cameron.

Following the defeat of the Labour government in 1949 he stood again for the city council at the 1950 local-body elections. He was successful and remained a member until 1958 when he again resigned when he accepted a diplomatic posting. He served a second spell as deputy mayor from 1953 to 1956.

He was also a member of both the Otago Harbour Board and the Otago Hospital Board.

=== Member of Parliament ===
New Zealand Parliament
Years	Term	Electorate	Party
1931–1935	24th	Dunedin South	Labour
1935–1938	25th	Dunedin South	Labour
1938–1943	26th	Dunedin South	Labour
1943–1946	27th	Dunedin South	Labour
1946–1949	28th	St Kilda	Labour
1949–1951	29th	St Kilda	Labour

Jones was the Member of Parliament for two Dunedin electorates: Dunedin South from 1931 to 1946, and then St Kilda from 1946 to 1951 when he was unexpectedly defeated, and was also defeated in an attempt to regain the seat in 1954. During his twenty years in Parliament he built up a reputation for hard work, friendly counsel and honesty. His ministerial rank strengthened his bargaining powers within the government and enabled him to provide his Dunedin constituents with a multitude of new amenities and modernised infrastructure.

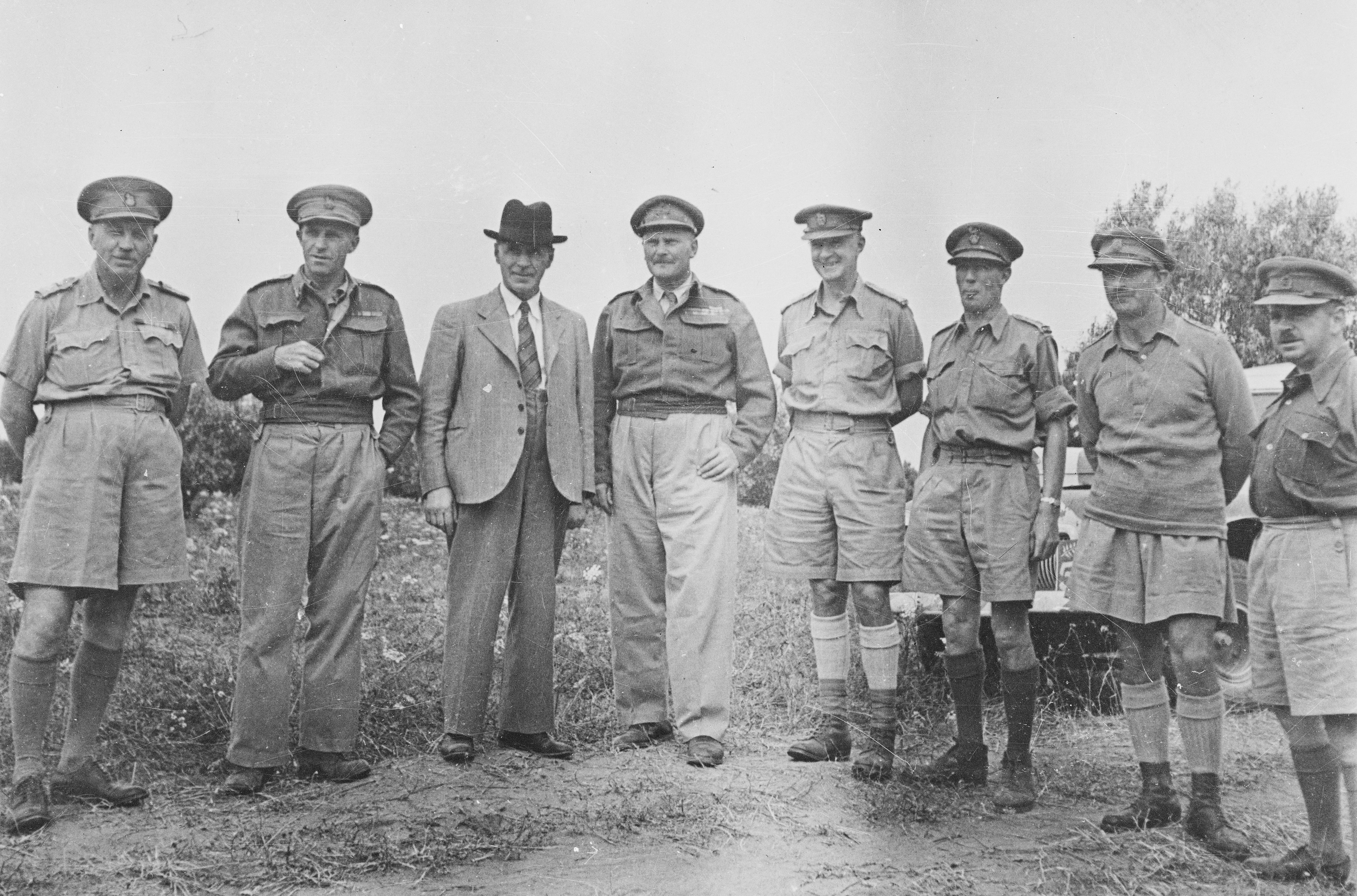
Jones with military officers in Tunisia, 1943

He was Minister of Defence from 1935 to 1949, and Postmaster-General between 1935 and 1940 in the First Labour Government. He also served as Minister in charge of War Pensions and Civil Aviation. His appointment as Minister of Defence was controversial as it had been widely expected that John A. Lee (a distinguished former soldier) would get the job. Officers in the military likewise expressed their displeasure at having to 'kow-tow to a bootmaker' as their new superior.

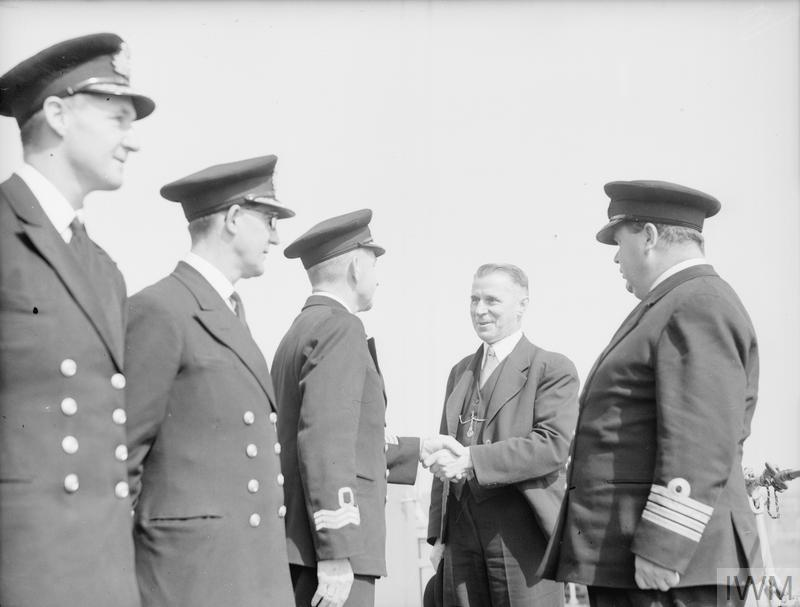
Jones meeting officers of HMNZS Achilles

As Minister of Defence during the duration of World War II he carried a tremendous workload but proved himself to be an effective administrator. ln July 1940 Jones was appointed a member of the War cabinet to deal with war production and finance and any other matters related to the war. He implemented the rearmament of New Zealand in the lead up to the war. He expanded the navy, created the air force and bolstered the territorial force. He was a key attendee of the Pacific Defence Conference held in Wellington in 1939 and served on the Council of Defence recruiting committee where he increased the number of volunteers.

In 1935, Jones was awarded the King George V Silver Jubilee Medal,. and in 1953 he was awarded the Queen Elizabeth II Coronation Medal.

=== Diplomatic career ===
Following the election of the Second Labour Government he was appointed by Prime Minister Walter Nash as New Zealand's High Commissioner to Australia in 1958. He served for three years until he retired after the expiry of his term in 1961.

=== Later life and death ===
In retirement he became president of the Dunedin Homing Pigeon Club and a trustee of Caversham kindergarten. He also furthered his involvement in horse racing, a sport which he had a lifelong interest despite never owning any horses himself.

His wife Jessie died in 1941. Her brother Wally likewise became a Labour MP in 1946.

He died on 25 May 1966, aged 81. He was survived by his three sons.

== Notes ==
Political offices
Preceded by John Cobbe	Minister of Defence; 1935–1949	Succeeded by Tom Macdonald
Preceded by Adam Hamilton	Postmaster-General and Minister of Telegraphs; 1935–1940	Succeeded by Paddy Webb
Preceded by David Wilson	Minister of Broadcasting; 1944–1949	Succeeded by Frederick Doidge
Preceded by James Marlow	Deputy Mayor of Dunedin; 1935–1937 1953–1956	Succeeded by Jim Munro
Preceded by Jim Barnes	Deputy Mayor of Dunedin; 1935–1937 1953–1956	Succeeded by Stuart Sidey
New Zealand Parliament
Preceded by William Taverner	Member of Parliament for Dunedin South; 1931–1946	Constituency abolished
New constituency	Member of Parliament for St Kilda; 1946–1951	Succeeded by Jim Barnes
Diplomatic posts
Preceded by Lisle Alderton	High Commissioner to Australia; 1958–1961	Succeeded by Syd Johnston
