= List of members of the New Zealand Parliament who died in office =

The following is a list of New Zealand MPs who died while serving their terms.

== Background ==
When a member dies during their term of office this generally causes a by-election, if the deceased member held an electorate seat. Under the Electoral Act 1993, a by-election is not needed when the death occurs within six months of a general election and if 75% of MPs support the postponement of the by-election. General elections may be brought forward to stay within the six-months period. Twice, in 1943 and 1969, by-elections were avoided after the deaths in election years of Paraire Karaka Paikea and Ralph Hanan by passing special acts, the By-election Postponement Act 1943 and the By-election Postponement Act 1969. When a death occurs close enough to a general election, the seat is left vacant, to be filled again at the general election.

If the deceased member held a list seat, the vacancy is filled by the next available person on their party's list.

Members who died after Parliament was dissolved after its final session are not listed here. The first time this happened was in 1855 when the 1st New Zealand Parliament was dissolved after its third session on 15 September 1855, with Alfred Christopher Picard dying two days later. Job Vile, who had represented the Manawatu electorate during the 15th New Zealand Parliament, died on 6 December 1905. This was the day of the 1905 general election, when he was defeated by John Stevens. Most recently, Allan Peachey died six days before the 2011 general election, from which he had withdrawn due to ill health.

== List of members ==
Key

Independent Conservative Liberal Liberal–Labour Reform Labour Independent Labour United Independent Liberal National Green Te Pāti Māori

Member	Electorate	Date of birth	First elected	Date of death	Age	Cause	Successor
Samuel Stephens	Town of Nelson	1803	1854	26 June 1855	51/52		Alfred Domett; Edward Stafford (1855 general election)
William Cutfield King	Grey and Bell	1829	1860	8 February 1861	32	Gunshot	Harry Atkinson (1861 Grey and Bell by-election)
Charles Kettle	Bruce	6 April 1821	1861	5 June 1862	41	Typhoid fever	Edward Cargill (1862 Bruce by-election)
Marmaduke Nixon	Franklin	1813	1861	27 May 1864	51	Gangrene from gunshot wound	Theodore Haultain (1864 Franklin by-election)
George Macfarlan	Lyttelton	1837	1867	9 October 1868	30	Fever	John Thomas Peacock (1868 Lyttelton by-election)
Francis Jollie	Gladstone	1815	1861	30 November 1870	55		George Parker (1871 general election)
John Williamson	City of Auckland West	25 August 1815	1855	16 February 1875	59		Patrick Dignan (1875 City of Auckland West by-election)
George Webster	Wallace		1869	15 July 1875		Inflammation of the brain	Christopher Basstian (1875 Wallace by-election)
William Tolmie	Caversham	1833	1872	8 August 1875	41/42		Robert Stout (1875 Caversham by-election)
Donald McLean	Napier	27 October 1820	1866	5 January 1877	56		Fred Sutton (1877 Napier by-election)
George Henry Tribe	Totara	1828	1871	19 March 1877	48/49		William Gisborne (1877 Totara by-election)
Frederick Teschemaker	Gladstone	1834	1876	21 November 1878	43/44		John Studholme (1879 Gladstone by-election)
Karaitiana Takamoana (Note: Succeeded by family member.)	Eastern Maori		1871	24 February 1879			Henare Tomoana (1879 Eastern Maori by-election)
George Ireland	Waikaia	1829	1879	15 August 1880	50/51		Horace Bastings (1880 Waikaia by-election)
Andrew Richmond	Suburbs of Nelson	1832	1861	15 November 1880	48	Heart disease	Arthur Collins (1881 Suburbs of Nelson by-election)
William Sefton Moorhouse	Ashley	c.1825	1853	15 September 1881	55/56	Complications from diabetes	William Fisher Pearson (1881 general election)
James Seaton	Peninsula	May 1822	1875	18 November 1882	60	Horse and buggy accident	William Larnach (1883 Peninsula by-election)
James Rutherford	Bruce	1825	1881	16 May 1883	58		James McDonald (1883 Bruce by-election)
Edward Lee	Selwyn	1822	1883	18 December 1883	60/61		Edward Wakefield (1884 Selwyn by-election)
John Sheehan	Tauranga	5 July 1844	1872	12 June 1885	40	Pneumonia and cirrhosis of the liver	Lawrence Grace (May 1885 Tauranga by-election)
James Benn Bradshaw	Dunedin Central	22 September 1832	1866	1 September 1886	54	Stroke	Thomas Bracken (1886 Dunedin Central by-election)
William John Hurst	Waitemata	1829	1879	29 September 1886	57		Richard Monk (1886 Waitemata by-election)
Te Puke Te Ao	Western Maori	1834	1884	28 October 1886	51/52		Hoani Taipua (1886 Western Maori by-election)
John Coster	Heathcote	1838	1884	17 December 1886	48		Frederic Jones (1887 Heathcote by-election)
James Macandrew	Port Chalmers	1819	1853	24 February 1887	67/68	Died from injuries sustained when he was accidentally thrown from a carriage outside his house	James Mills (1887 Port Chalmers by-election)
Ihaka Hakuene	Northern Maori	1836	1884	6 April 1887	50/51	Food poisoning	Wi Katene (1887 Northern Maori by-election)
William Fisher Pearson	Ashley	1854	1881	3 July 1888	33		John Verrall (1888 Ashley by-election)
Henry Levestam	Nelson	1833	1881	11 February 1889	55/56	Heart attack	Joseph Harkness (1889 Nelson by-election)
William Jackson	Waipa	11 October 1832	1872	29 September 1889	56	Presumed drowning	John Bryce (1889 Waipa by-election)
Richard Turnbull	Timaru	1826	1878	17 July 1890	63/64		William Hall-Jones (1890 Timaru by-election)
Frederic Jones	Heathcote	1832	1887	8 September 1890	58		William Tanner (1890 general election)
Sydney Taiwhanga	Northern Maori	c. 1832	1887	27 November 1890			Eparaima Te Mutu Kapa (1891 Northern Maori by-election)
Douglas Hastings Macarthur	Rangitikei	1839	1884	24 May 1892	52/53		Robert Bruce (1892 Rangitikei by-election)
John Ballance (Note: Prime Minister at time of death.)	Wanganui	27 March 1839	1875	27 April 1893	54	Intestinal disease	Archibald Willis (1893 Wanganui by-election)
Vincent Pyke	Tuapeka	4 February 1827	1873	5 June 1894	67		William Larnach (1894 Tuapeka by-election)
Henry Fish	City of Dunedin	15 July 1838	1881	23 September 1897	59	Throat cancer	Alexander Sligo (1897 City of Dunedin by-election)
William Larnach	Tuapeka	27 January 1833	1875	12 October 1898	65	Suicide by firearm	Charles Rawlins (1898 Tuapeka by-election)
Henry Augustus Field	Otaki	1852	1896	8 December 1899	48		William Hughes Field (1900 Otaki by-election)
William Crowther	City of Auckland	1834	1893	15 March 1900	66	Stomach cancer	Joseph Witheford (1900 City of Auckland by-election)
Arthur Morrison	Caversham	22 November 1846	1893	21 November 1901	54	Throat cancer	Thomas Sidey (1901 Caversham by-election)
John O'Meara	Pahiatua	1856	1896	3 July 1904	47/48	Stroke	Bill Hawkins (1904 Pahiatua by-election)
George Fisher	City of Wellington	1843	1884	14 March 1905	61/62		Frank Fisher (1905 City of Wellington by-election)
Richard Seddon	Westland	22 June 1845	1879	10 June 1906	60	Heart attack	Tom Seddon (1906 Westland by-election)
Matthew Kirkbride	Manukau	13 August 1848	1902	4 November 1906	58		Frederic Lang (1906 Manukau by-election)
Edward Smith	Taranaki	10 January 1839	1890	19 April 1907	68		Henry Okey (1907 Taranaki by-election)
James Bennet	Tuapeka	1830	1899	3 May 1908	77/78		William Chapple (1908 Tuapeka by-election)
Hōne Heke Ngāpua	Northern Maori	6 June 1869	1893	9 February 1909	39	Tuberculosis	Peter Buck (Pita Rangihiroa) (1909 Northern Maori by-election)
Arthur Remington	Rangitikei	28 July 1856	1902	17 August 1909	53		Robbie Smith (1909 Rangitikei by-election)
Frederick Baume	Auckland East	13 June 1862	1902	14 May 1910	47	Heart failure	Arthur Myers (1910 Auckland East by-election)
Tommy Taylor	Christchurch North	16 June 1862	1896	27 July 1911	49	Perforated gastric ulcer	Leonard Isitt (1911 Christchurch North by-election)
Arthur Guinness	Grey	11 January 1846	1884	10 June 1913	67		Paddy Webb (1913 Grey by-election)
George Laurenson	Lyttelton	1857	1899	19 November 1913			James McCombs (1913 Lyttelton by-election)
James Escott	Pahiatua	17 April 1872	1911	28 July 1916	44		Harold Smith (1916 Pahiatua by-election)
Robert McNab	Hawke's Bay	1 October 1864	1893	3 February 1917	52	Heart failure	John Findlay (1917 Hawkes Bay by-election)
Taare Parata	Southern Maori	1865	1911	8 January 1918	52/53		Hopere Uru (1918 Southern Maori by-election)
Robert Fletcher	Wellington Central	3 July 1863	1914	4 September 1918	55		Peter Fraser (1918 Wellington Central by-election)
Henry Okey	Taranaki	28 May 1857	1907	13 September 1918	61		Sydney George Smith (1918 Taranaki by-election)
Alfred Hindmarsh	Wellington South	18 April 1860	1911	13 November 1918	58	Spanish flu	Bob Semple (1918 Wellington South by-election)
David Buick	Palmerston	29 April 1848	1908	18 November 1918	70	Spanish flu	Jimmy Nash (1918 Palmerston by-election)
James Colvin	Buller	1844	1899	29 October 1919	74/75	Tram crash	Harry Holland (1919 general election)
William MacDonald	Bay of Plenty	1862	1908	31 August 1920	57/58	Heart attack	Kenneth Williams (1920 Bay of Plenty by-election)
Walter Powdrell	Patea	1872	1919	9 March 1921	48/49	Fall from a building	Edwin Dixon (1921 Patea by-election)
Hopere Uru	Southern Maori	26 March 1868	1918	29 November 1921	53	Bright's disease	Henare Uru (1922 Southern Maori by-election)
Edward Kellett	Dunedin North	7 November 1864	1919	15 May 1922	57		Jim Munro (1922 Dunedin North by-election)
William Herries	Tauranga	19 April 1859	1896	22 February 1923	63		Charles Macmillan (1923 Tauranga by-election)
William Massey	Franklin	26 March 1856	1894	10 May 1925	69	Cancer	Ewen McLennan (1925 Franklin by-election)
Richard Bollard	Raglan	23 May 1863	1911	25 August 1927	64	Pneumonia	Lee Martin (1927 Raglan by-election)
Māui Pōmare	Western Maori	1875	1911	27 June 1930	54	Tuberculosis	Taite Te Tomo (1930 Western Maori by-election)
Joseph Ward	Invercargill	26 April 1856	1887	8 July 1930	74	Heart failure	Vincent Ward (1930 Invercargill by-election)
George Hunter	Waipawa	1859	1896	20 August 1930	70/71		Albert Jull (1930 Waipawa by-election)
Arthur Hall	Hauraki	3 August 1880	1928	18 April 1931	50	intracerebral hemorrhage	Walter William Massey (1931 Hauraki by-election)
Tuiti Makitanara	Southern Maori	8 August 1874	1928	24 June 1932	57		Eruera Tirikātene (1932 Southern Maori by-election)
George Black	Motueka	21 November 1903	1928	17 October 1932	28	Suicide by cyanide	Keith Holyoake (1932 Motueka by-election)
James McCombs	Lyttelton	9 December 1873	1913	2 August 1933	59	Heart failure	Elizabeth McCombs (1933 Lyttelton by-election)
Harry Holland	Buller	10 June 1868	1918	8 October 1933	65	Heart attack	Paddy Webb (1933 Buller by-election)
Elizabeth McCombs	Lyttelton	19 November 1873	1933	7 June 1935	61		Terry McCombs (1935 Lyttelton by-election)
Jeremiah Connolly	Mid-Canterbury	1875	1931	2 October 1935	59/60		Horace Herring (1935 general election)
Ted Howard	Christchurch South	18 June 1868	1919	26 April 1939	70		Robert Macfarlane (1939 Christchurch South by-election)
Michael Joseph Savage	Auckland West	23 March 1872	1919	27 March 1940	68	Colon cancer	Peter Carr (1940 Auckland West by-election)
Albert Jull	Waipawa	6 December 1864	1930	24 September 1940	75		Cyril Harker (1940 Waipawa by-election)
Jack Lyon	Waitemata	15 February 1898	1935	26 May 1941	43	Killed in action	Mary Dreaver (1941 Waitemata by-election)
Gordon Hultquist	Bay of Plenty	1904	1935	1 November 1941	36/37	Influenza	Bill Sullivan (1941 Bay of Plenty by-election)
John Manchester Allen	Hauraki	3 August 1901	1938	28 November 1941	40	Killed in action	Andy Sutherland (1942 Hauraki by-election)
Arthur Grigg	Mid-Canterbury	1896	1938	29 November 1941	44/45	Killed in action	Mary Grigg (1942 Mid-Canterbury by-election)
Thomas Burnett	Temuka	25 November 1877	1919	30 November 1941	64		Jack Acland (1942 Temuka by-election)
Tim Armstrong	Christchurch East	28 September 1875	1922	8 November 1942	67	Heart disease	Mabel Howard (1943 Christchurch East by-election)
Paraire Karaka Paikea	Northern Maori	1 June 1894	1938	6 April 1943	48		Tāpihana Paraire Paikea (1943 general election)
Alfred Ransom	Pahiatua	19 March 1868	1922	22 May 1943	75		Keith Holyoake (1943 general election)
Gordon Coates	Kaipara	3 February 1878	1911	27 May 1943	65	Heart failure	Clifton Webb (1943 general election)
James Hargest	Awarua	4 September 1891	1931	12 August 1944	52	Killed in action	George Herron (1944 Awarua by-election)
Toko Ratana	Western Maori	21 July 1894	1935	30 October 1944	50		Matiu Rātana (1945 Western Maori by-election)
Frank Findlay	Hamilton	1884	1943	31 March 1945	60/61	Heart attack	Hilda Ross (1945 Hamilton by-election)
Jim Munro	Dunedin North	22 February 1870	1922	27 May 1945	75		Robert Walls (1945 Dunedin North by-election)
Robert Coulter	Raglan	1891	1935	31 December 1945	54		Hallyburton Johnstone (1946 Raglan by-election)
Harry Atmore	Nelson	14 December 1870	1911	20 August 1946	75		Edgar Neale (1946 general election)
Peter Carr	Auckland West	1884	1940	18 October 1946	61/62		Seat abolished
Dan Sullivan	Avon	18 July 1882	1919	8 April 1947	64	Coronary artery disease	John Mathison (1947 Avon by-election)
Arthur Shapton Richards	Mount Albert	1877	1931	5 August 1947	69/70		Warren Freer (1947 Mount Albert by-election)
James O'Brien	Westland	8 June 1874	1922	28 September 1947	73		Jim Kent (1947 Westland by-election)
Matiu Rātana	Western Maori	16 December 1912	1945	7 October 1949	36	Car accident	Iriaka Rātana (1949 general election)
Peter Fraser	Brooklyn	28 August 1884	1918	12 December 1950	66	Heart attack	Arnold Nordmeyer (1951 Brooklyn by-election)
Robert Walls	North Dunedin	18 September 1884	1945	6 November 1953	69		Ethel McMillan (1953 North Dunedin by-election)
Arthur Osborne	Onehunga	14 March 1891	1936	15 November 1953	62		Hugh Watt (1953 Onehunga by-election)
Harry Combs	Onslow	14 January 1881	1938	12 June 1954	73		Henry May (1954 Onslow by-election)
David Campbell Kidd	Waimate	29 September 1889	1938	23 September 1954	64		Alfred Davey (1954 general election)
Angus McLagan	Riccarton	1891	1946	4 September 1956	64/65		Mick Connelly (1956 Riccarton by-election)
Hilda Ross	Hamilton	6 July 1883	1945	6 March 1959	75		Lance Adams-Schneider (1959 Hamilton by-election)
William Gillespie	Hurunui	14 August 1893	1943	23 April 1961	67	Heart attack	Lorrie Pickering (1961 Hurunui by-election)
Thomas Hayman	Waitaki	24 May 1904	1949	2 January 1962	57	Heart attack	Allan Dick (1962 Waitaki by-election)
Jerry Skinner	Buller	19 January 1900	1938	26 April 1962	62	Died in his sleep, likely a stroke	Bill Rowling (1962 Buller by-election)
Tāpihana Paraire Paikea	Northern Maori	26 January 1920	1943	7 January 1963	42	Heart failure exacerbated by stress	Matiu Rata (1963 Northern Maori by-election)
James Deas	Otahuhu	1890	1954	27 January 1963	72/73	Bronchitis	Bob Tizard (1963 Otahuhu by-election)
Fred Hackett	Grey Lynn	11 November 1901	1943	19 March 1963	61	Brain disease	Reginald Keeling (1963 Grey Lynn by-election)
Eruera Tirikatene	Southern Maori	5 January 1895	1932	11 January 1967	72	Brief illness	Whetu Tirikatene (1967 Southern Maori by-election)
Mick Moohan	Petone	27 April 1899	1946	7 February 1967	67	Cancer	Fraser Colman (1967 Petone by-election)
Harry Lake	Fendalton	29 September 1911	1951	21 February 1967	55	Heart attack	Eric Holland (1967 Fendalton by-election)
Puti Tipene Watene	Eastern Maori	18 August 1910	1963	14 June 1967	56	Heart attack	Paraone Reweti (1967 Eastern Maori by-election)
Bill Brown	Palmerston North	18 June 1899	1960	16 October 1967	68		Joe Walding (1967 Palmerston North by-election)
Walter Nash	Hutt	12 February 1882	1929	4 June 1968	86	Heart attack	Trevor Young (1968 Hutt by-election)
Ralph Hanan	Invercargill	13 June 1909	1946	24 July 1969	60	Injuries received in World War Two	John Chewings (1969 general election)
Tom Shand	Marlborough	16 April 1911	1946	11 December 1969	58	Lung cancer	Ian Brooks (1970 Marlborough by-election)
Norman Kirk	Sydenham	6 January 1923	1957	31 August 1974	51	Pulmonary embolism	John Kirk (1974 Sydenham by-election)
Stan Whitehead	Nelson	8 October 1907	1957	9 January 1976	68	Heart attack	Mel Courtney (1976 Nelson by-election)
Roy Jack	Rangitikei	12 January 1914	1954	24 December 1977	63	Complications from surgery	Bruce Beetham (1978 Rangitikei by-election)
Bruce Barclay	Christchurch Central	21 October 1922	1969	28 June 1979	56	Cancer	Geoffrey Palmer (1979 Christchurch Central by-election)
Frank Rogers	Onehunga	27 December 1933	1975	25 April 1980	46	Stroke	Fred Gerbic (1980 Onehunga by-election)
Basil Arthur	Timaru	18 September 1928	1962	1 May 1985	56	Legionnaires' disease	Maurice McTigue (1985 Timaru by-election)
Bruce Townshend	Kaimai	21 November 1931	1978	25 April 1987	55	Natural causes	Robert Anderson (1987 general election)
Rod Donald	List	10 October 1957	1996	6 November 2005	48	Myocarditis	Nándor Tánczos (Appointment)
Parekura Horomia	Ikaroa-Rāwhiti	9 November 1950	1999	29 April 2013	62	Complications from a diet and obesity	Meka Whaitiri (2013 Ikaroa-Rāwhiti by-election)
Efeso Collins	List	27 May 1974	2023	21 February 2024	49	Collapsed and died	Lawrence Xu-Nan (Appointment)
Takutai Tarsh Kemp	Tāmaki Makaurau	20 June 1975	2023	26 June 2025	50	Kidney disease	Oriini Kaipara (2025 Tāmaki Makaurau by-election)
