= List of New Zealand Labour Party MPs =

The following is a list of members of the New Zealand Labour Party who have served in the New Zealand House of Representatives. The New Zealand Labour Party was founded in 1916. Most members had been a part of the United Labour Party or Social Democratic Party.

Several members of Parliament (MPs) were associated with precursors to the New Zealand Labour Party but did not join it in 1916; John Payne and Bill Veitch. Both supported conscription in World War I unlike their colleagues. Veitch was part of the United Labour Party "Remnant" with Alfred Hindmarsh and Andrew Walker (See pre-1916 MPs). Two MPs were subsequently elected as Independent Labour candidates; Sydney Smith in 1918 & Edward Kellett in 1919, but never joined the party.

Name	Portrait	First Elected / Joined Party	Electorates	Left Party / Parliament	Notes
Alfred Hindmarsh		1916*	Wellington South (1916–1918)	1918†	original Labour (Wellington South) & United Labour MP 1912–1916 (Wellington South), Leader (1916–18)
James McCombs		1916*	Lyttelton (1916–1917); Lyttelton (1918–1933)	1933†	First elected in by-election, Social Democratic MP 1913–1916 & Independent MP 1917–1918
Paddy Webb		1916*	Grey (1916–1918); Buller (1933–1946)	1946	First elected in by-election, Social Democratic MP 1913–1916 (Grey) jailed (sedition, 1917), won subsequent by-election (1917), jailed (1918–1920), re-elected in 1933 by-election
Andrew Walker		1916*	Dunedin North (1916–1919)	1919	United Labour MP 1914–1916 (Dunedin North)
Harry Holland		1918	Grey (1918–1919); Buller (1919–1933)	1933†	First elected in by-election, Leader of the Opposition (1926–1928 & 1931–1933)
Peter Fraser		1918	Wellington Central (1918–1946); Brooklyn (1946–1951)	1950†	First elected in by-election, Prime Minister (1940–1949), Leader of the Opposition (1949–1950)
Bob Semple		1918	Wellington South (1918–1919); Wellington East (1928–1946); Miramar (1946–1954)	1954	First elected in by-election
Ted Howard		1919	Christchurch South (1919–1939)	1939†	
Dan Sullivan		1919	Avon (1919–1947)	1947†	
Michael Joseph Savage		1919	Auckland West (1919–1940)	1940†	Prime Minister (1935–1940), Leader of the Opposition (1933–1935)
Bill Parry		1919	Auckland Central (1919–1946); Arch Hill (1946–1951)	1951	
Fred Bartram		1919	Grey Lynn (1919–1928)	1928	
James Munro		1922	Dunedin North (1922–1925); Dunedin North (1928–1945)	1945†	First elected in by-election
James O'Brien		1922	Westland (1922–1925); Westland (1928–1947)	1947†	
Bill Jordan		1922	Manukau (1922–1936)	1936	
Frank Langstone		1922	Waimarino (1922–1925); Waimarino (1928–1946); Roskill (1946–1949)	1949*	Independent MP 1949 (Roskill)
John A. Lee		1922	Auckland East (1922–1928); Grey Lynn (1931–1940)	1940*	Expelled from Labour Party (1940), Democratic Labour MP 1940–1943 (Grey Lynn)
Lew McIlvride		1922	Napier (1922–1925)	1925	
Bob McKeen		1922	Wellington South (1922–1946); Island Bay (1946–1954)	1954	
Alec Monteith		1922	Wellington East (1922–1925)	1925	
Tim Armstrong		1922	Christchurch East (1922–1942)	1942†	
Rex Mason		1926	Eden (1926–1928); Auckland Suburbs (1928–1946); Waitakere (1946–1963); New Lynn (1963–1966)	1966	First elected in by-election
Lee Martin		1927	Raglan (1927–1931); Raglan (1935–1943)	1943	First elected in by-election, appointed to Legislative Council (1946–1950)
Clyde Carr		1928	Timaru (1928–1962)	1962	Resigned mid-term due to health
Charles Chapman		1928	Wellington North (1928–1946); Wellington Central (1946–1954)	1954	
Bill Barnard		1928	Napier (1928–1940)	1940*	Democratic Labour MP 1940–43, Independent candidate in 1943
Walter Nash		1929	Hutt (1929–1968)	1968†	First elected in by-election, Prime Minister (1957–1960), Leader of the Opposition (1951–1957 & 1960–1963)
David Coleman		1931	Gisborne (1931–1949)	1949	
Fred Jones		1931	Dunedin South (1931–1946); St Kilda (1946–1951)	1951	
Arthur Richards		1931	Roskill (1931–1946); Mount Albert (1946–1947)	1947†	
Bill Schramm		1931	Auckland East (1931–1946)	1946	
Elizabeth McCombs		1933	Lyttelton (1933–1935)	1935†	New Zealand's first female MP, first elected in by-election, wife of previous MP
Terry McCombs		1935	Lyttelton (1935–1951)	1951	First elected in by-election, son of the two previous MPs
Bill Anderton		1935	Eden (1935–1946); Auckland Central (1946–1960)	1960	
Jim Barclay		1935	Marsden (1935–1943)	1943	
David Barnes		1935	Waitaki (1935–1938)	1938	
Charles Barrell		1935	Hamilton (1935–1943)	1943	
Charles Burnett		1935	Tauranga (1935–1938)	1938	
Archie Campbell		1935	Chalmers (1935–1938)	1938	
Max Christie		1935	Waipawa (1935–1938)	1938	
Joe Cotterill		1935	Wanganui (1935–1960)	1960	
Robert Coulter		1935	Waikato (1935–1938); Raglan (1943–1945)	1945†	
Ted Cullen		1935	Hawkes Bay (1935–1946); Hastings (1946–1949)	1949	
William Denham		1935	Invercargill (1935–1946)	1946	
Horace Herring		1935	Mid-Canterbury (1935–1938)	1938	
Joe Hodgens		1935	Palmerston (1935–1938); Palmerston North (1938–1946)	1946	
Gordon Hultquist		1935	Bay of Plenty (1935–1941)	1941†	
Lorrie Hunter		1935	Manawatu (1935–1938)	1938	
Leonard Lowry		1935	Otaki (1935–1946)	1946	
Jack Lyon		1935	Waitemata (1935–1941)	1941†	Killed in Action in World War II
Ben Roberts		1935	Wairarapa (1935–1946)	1946	
John Robertson		1935*	Masterton (1935–1943)	1943	Original Labour MP 1911–1914 (Otaki)
Gervan McMillan		1935	Dunedin West (1935–1943)	1943	
Ted Meachen		1935	Wairau (1935–1938); Marlborough (1938–1946)	1946	
Alex Moncur		1935	Rotorua (1935–1943)	1943	
Peter Neilson		1935	Dunedin Central (1935–1946)	1946	
Arnold Nordmeyer		1935	Oamaru (1935–1949); Brooklyn (1951–1954); Island Bay (1954–1969)	1969	Leader of the Opposition (1963–1965)
Charles Petrie		1935	Hauraki (1935–1938); Otahuhu (1938–1949)	1949	
Jim Thorn		1935	Thames (1935–1946)	1946	
Morgan Williams		1935	Kaiapoi (1935–1946)	1946	
Ormond Wilson		1935	Rangitikei (1935–1938); Palmerston North (1946–1949)	1949	
Toko Ratana		1936*	Western Māori (1936–1944)	1944†	Ratana MP 1935–1936 (Western Māori)
Eruera Tirikatene		1936*	Southern Māori (1936–1967)	1967†	Ratana MP 1932–1936 (Southern Māori)
Arthur Osborne		1936	Manukau (1936–1938); Onehunga (1938–1953)	1953†	First elected in by-election
Charles Boswell		1938	Bay of Islands (1938–1943)	1943	
Harry Combs		1938	Wellington Suburbs (1938–1946); Onslow (1946–1954)	1954	
Fred Frost		1938	New Plymouth (1938–1943)	1943	
Paraire Karaka Paikea		1938	Northern Māori (1938–1943)	1943†	
Jerry Skinner		1938	Motueka (1938–1946); Buller (1946–1962)	1962†	Deputy Prime-Minister 1957–60
Catherine Stewart		1938	Wellington West (1938–1943)	1943	Second female MP
Robert Macfarlane		1939	Christchurch South (1939–1946); Christchurch Central (1946–1969)	1969	First elected in by-election
Peter Carr		1940	Auckland West (1940–1946)	1946†	First elected in by-election
Mary Dreaver		1941	Waitemata (1941–1943)	1943	First elected in by-election, third female MP
Mabel Howard		1943	Christchurch East (1943–1946); Sydenham (1946–1969)	1969	First elected in by-election, first female Cabinet Minister, 1947–1949, 1957–1960
Tapihana Paraire Paikea		1943	Northern Maori (1943–1963)	1963†	Son of previous MP
Phil Connolly		1943	Dunedin West (1943–1946); Dunedin Central (1946–1963)	1963	
Fred Hackett		1943	Grey Lynn (1943–1963)	1963†	
Tiaki Omana		1943	Eastern Maori (1943–1963)	1963	
Tommy Armstrong		1943	Napier (1943–1951)	1951	Son of previous MP
Matiu Ratana		1945	Western Maori (1945–1949)	1949	First elected in by-election, brother of previous MP
Robert Walls		1945	Dunedin North (1945–1946); North Dunedin (1946–1953)	1953†	First elected in by-election
Wally Hudson		1946	Mornington (1946–1963)	1963	
Martyn Finlay		1946	North Shore (1946–1949); Waitakere (1963–1978)	1978	
Mick Moohan		1946	Petone (1946–1967)	1967†	
Ritchie Macdonald		1946	Ponsonby (1946–1963); Grey Lynn (1963–1969)	1969	
Alan Baxter		1946	Raglan (1946–1949)	1949	
Angus McLagan		1946	Riccarton (1946–1956)	1956†	
Tom Skinner		1946	Tamaki (1946–1949)	1949	
Paddy Kearins		1946	Waimarino (1946–1954)	1954	
John Mathison		1947	Avon (1947–1972)	1972	First elected in by-election
Warren Freer		1947	Mount Albert (1947–1981)	1981	First elected in by-election
Jim Kent		1947	Westland (1947–1960)	1960	First elected in by-election
Reg Keeling		1949	Gisborne (1949–1951); Gisborne (1954–1960); Grey Lynn (1963)	1963	Re-elected in 1963 by-election
Iriaka Matiu Ratana		1949	Western Maori (1949–1969)	1969	First elected in by-election, wife of previous MP, first female Māori MP
John Stewart		1951	Arch Hill (1951–1954)	1954	
Ethel McMillan		1953	North Dunedin (1953–1963); Dunedin North (1963–1975)	1975	First elected in by-election
Hugh Watt		1953	Onehunga (1953–1975)	1975	First elected in by-election, Acting Prime Minister (1974)
Henry May		1954	Onslow (1954–1963); Porirua (1963–1969); Western Hutt (1969–1975)	1975	First elected in by-election
Ted Keating		1954	Hastings (1954–1960)	1960	
Jim Edwards		1954	Napier (1954–1966)	1966*	Independent MP 1966
Phil Skoglund		1954	Palmerston North (1954–1960)	1960	
Bill Fox		1954	Miramar (1954–1966)	1966	
Frank Kitts		1954	Wellington Central (1954–1960)	1960	
Ray Boord		1954	Rotorua (1954–1960)	1960	
Phil Holloway		1954	Heretaunga (1954–1960)	1960	
Norman King		1954	Waitemata (1954–1969); Birkenhead (1969–1975)	1975	
James Deas		1954	Otahuhu (1954–1963)	1963†	
Mick Connelly		1956	Riccarton (1956–1969); Wigram (1969–1978); Yaldhurst (1978–1984)	1984	First elected in by-election
Bill Fraser		1957	St Kilda (1957–1981)	1981	
Arthur Faulkner		1957	Roskill (1957–1981)	1981	
Bob Tizard		1957	Tamaki (1957–1960); Otahuhu (1963); Pakuranga (1963–1972); Otahuhu (1972–1984); Panmure (1984–1990)	1990	Re-elected in 1963 by-election
Norman Kirk		1957	Lyttelton (1957–1969); Sydenham (1969–1974)	1974†	Prime Minister (1972–1974), Leader of the Opposition (1965–1972)
Stan Whitehead		1957	Nelson (1957–1976)	1976†	
Neville Pickering		1957	St Albans (1957–1960)	1960	
George Spooner		1960	Wanganui (1960–1969)	1969	
Ron Bailey		1960	Heretaunga (1960–1981)	1981	
Norman Douglas		1960	Auckland Central (1960–1975)	1975	
Paddy Blanchfield		1960	Westland (1960–1972); West Coast (1972–1978)	1978	
Bill Rowling		1962	Buller (1962–1972); Tasman (1972–1984)	1984	First elected in by-election, Prime Minister (1974–1975), Leader of the Opposition (1975–1983)
Basil Arthur		1962	Timaru (1962–1985)	1985†	First elected in by-election
Matiu Rata		1963	Northern Māori (1963–1979)	1979*	First elected in by-election, Independent MP 1979–1980, lost subsequent 1980 by-election
Phil Amos		1963	Manurewa (1963–1975)	1975	
Brian MacDonell		1963	Dunedin Central (1963–1983)	1983*	Independent MP 1983–84
Colin Moyle		1963	Manukau (1963–1969); Mangere (1969–1977); Hunua (1981–1984); Otara (1984–1990)	1990	Resigned (1977)
Puti Tipene Watene		1963	Eastern Maori (1963–1967)	1967†	
Gordon Christie		1966	Napier (1966–1981)	1981	
Jonathan Hunt		1966	New Lynn (1966–1996); List (1996–2005)	2005	
Ron Barclay		1966	New Plymouth (1966–1975)	1975	
Whetu Tirikatene-Sullivan		1967	Southern Maori (1967–1996)	1996	First elected in by-election, daughter of previous MP
Fraser Colman		1967	Petone (1967–1978); Pencarrow (1978–1987)	1987	First elected in by-election
Joe Walding		1967	Palmerston North (1967–1975); Palmerston North (1978–1981)	1981	First elected in by-election
Paraone Reweti		1967	Eastern Maori (1967–1981)	1981	First elected in by-election
Trevor Young		1968	Hutt (1968–1978); Eastern Hutt (1978–1990)	1990	First elected in by-election
Gerald O'Brien		1969	Island Bay (1969–1978)	1978	Left party
Jack Williams		1969	Wairarapa (1969–1975)	1975	
Bruce Barclay		1969	Christchurch Central (1969–1979)	1979†	
Eddie Isbey		1969	Grey Lynn (1969–1978); Papatoetoe (1978–1987)	1987	
Koro Wētere		1969	Western Maori (1969–1996)	1996	
Tom McGuigan		1969	Lyttelton (1969–1975)	1975	
Roger Douglas		1969	Manukau (1969–1978); Manurewa (1978–1990)	1990*	ACT MP 2008–2011 (List)
Roger Drayton		1969	St Albans (1969–1978)	1978	
Gerry Wall		1969	Porirua (1969–1987)	1987	
Ian Brooks		1970	Marlborough (1970–1975)	1975	First elected in by-election
Michael Bassett		1972	Waitemata (1972–1975); Te Atatū (1978–1990)	1990	
Mary Batchelor		1972	Avon (1972–1987)	1987	
Aubrey Begg		1972	Awarua (1972–1975)	1975	
Kerry Burke		1972	Rangiora (1972–1975); West Coast (1978–1990)	1990	
Trevor Davey		1972	Gisborne (1972–1975)	1975	
Dorothy Jelicich		1972	Hamilton West (1972–1975)	1975	
Bill Laney		1972	Oamaru (1972–1975)	1975	
Russell Marshall		1972	Wanganui (1972–1990)	1990	
Richard Mayson		1972	Hastings (1972–1975)	1975	
Mike Moore		1972	Eden (1972–1975); Papanui (1978–1984); Christchurch North (1984–1996); Waimakariri (1996–1999)	1999	Prime Minister (1990), Leader of the Opposition (1990–1993)
J. B. Munro		1972	Invercargill (1972–1975)	1975	
Frank O'Flynn		1972	Kapiti (1972–1975); Island Bay (1978–1987)	1987	
Ian Quigley		1972	Otago Central (1972–1975)	1975	
Jack Ridley		1972	Taupo (1972–1975); Taupo (1978–1981)	1981	
Rufus Rogers		1972	Hamilton East (1972–1975)	1975	
Murray Smith		1972	Whangarei (1972–1975)	1975	
John Kirk		1974	Sydenham (1974–1983)	1983*	First elected in by-election, son of previous MP, Independent MP 1983–1984
Richard Prebble		1975	Auckland Central (1975–1993)	1993*	ACT MP 1996–2005
Frank Rogers		1975	Onehunga (1975–1980)	1980†	
Mel Courtney		1976	Nelson (1976–1981)	1981*	First elected in by-election, Independent MP 1981
David Lange		1977	Mangere (1977–1996)	1996	First elected in by-election, Prime Minister (1984–1989), Leader of the Opposition (1983–1984)
Ann Hercus		1978	Lyttelton (1978–1987)	1987	
David Butcher		1978	Hastings (1978–1990)	1990	
John Terris		1978	Western Hutt (1978–1990)	1990	
Stan Rodger		1978	Dunedin North (1978–1990)	1990	
Ralph Maxwell		1978	Waitakere (1978–1984); Titirangi (1984–1990)	1990	
David Caygill		1978	St Albans (1978–1996)	1996	
Malcolm Douglas		1978	Hunua (1978–1979)	1979	In 1979 an Electoral Court decision reversed the 1978 election result and awarded the Hunua seat to Winston Peters.
Geoffrey Palmer		1979	Christchurch Central (1979–1990)	1990	First elected in by-election, Prime Minister (1989–1990)
Bruce Gregory		1980	Northern Maori (1980–1993)	1993	First elected in by-election
Fred Gerbic		1980	Onehunga (1980–1990)	1990	First elected in by-election
Phil Goff		1981	Roskill (1981–1990); Roskill (1993–1996); New Lynn (1996–1999); Mt Roskill (1999–2016)	2016	Leader of the Opposition (2008–2011)
Michael Cullen		1981	St Kilda (1981–1996); Dunedin South (1996–1999); List (1999–2009)	2009	
Peter Tapsell		1981	Eastern Maori (1981–1996)	1996	
Geoff Braybrooke		1981	Napier (1981–2002)	2002	
Bill Jeffries		1981	Heretaunga (1981–1990)	1990	
Helen Clark		1981	Mount Albert (1981–2009)	2009	Prime Minister (1999–2008), Leader of the Opposition (1993–1999)
Trevor de Cleene		1981	Palmerston North (1981–1990)	1990	
Peter Neilson		1981	Miramar (1981–1990)	1990	
Fran Wilde		1981	Wellington Central (1981–1992)	1992	
Philip Woollaston		1981	Nelson (1981–1990)	1990	
Margaret Shields		1981	Kapiti (1981–1990)	1990	
Clive Matthewson		1984	Dunedin West (1984–1995)	1995*	United MP 1995–1996
Anne Fraser		1984	East Cape (1984–1990)	1990	
Richard Northey		1984	Eden (1984–1990); Onehunga (1993–1996)	1996	
Allan Wallbank		1984	Gisborne (1984–1990)	1990	
Bill Dillon		1984	Hamilton East (1984–1990)	1990	
Trevor Mallard		1984	Hamilton West (1984–1990); Pencarrow (1993–1996); Hutt South (1996–2017); List (2017–2023)	2023	
Bill Sutton		1984	Hawke's Bay (1984–1990)	1990	
Annette King		1984	Horowhenua (1984–1990); Miramar (1993–1996); Rongotai (1996–2017)	2017	
Peter Dunne		1984	Ohariu (1984–1993); Onslow (1993–1994)	1994*	Independent (1994), Future NZ (1994–95), United MP (1995–2002), United Future (2002–2017)
Jim Anderton		1984	Sydenham (1984–1989)	1989*	NewLabour MP 1989–91, Alliance MP 1991–2002, Progressive MP (2002–11)
Ken Shirley		1984	Tasman (1984–1990)	1990*	ACT MP 1996–2005
Reg Boorman		1984	Wairarapa (1984–1988)	1988	In 1988 an Electoral Court decision reversed the 1987 election result and awarded the Wairarapa seat to Wyatt Creech.
Jim Sutton		1984	Waitaki (1984–1990); Timaru (1993–1996); Aoraki (1996–2005); List (2005–2008)	2008	
Margaret Austin		1984	Yaldhurst (1984–1995)	1995*	United MP 1995–1996
Jack Elder		1984	West Auckland (1984–1993); Henderson (1993–1996)	1996*	NZ First MP 1996–98, Mauri Pacific MP 1998–99
Judy Keall		1984	Glenfield (1984–1990); Horowhenua (1993–1996); Otaki (1996–2002)	2002	
Noel Scott		1984	Tongariro (1984–1990)	1990	
Larry Sutherland		1987	Avon (1987–1996); Christchurch East (1996–1999)	1999	
Jenny Kirk		1987	Birkenhead (1987–1990)	1990	
Elizabeth Tennet		1987	Island Bay (1987–1996)	1996	
Peter Simpson		1987	Lyttelton (1987–1990)	1990	
David Robinson		1987	Manawatu (1987–1990)	1990	
Harry Duynhoven		1987	New Plymouth (1987–1990); New Plymouth (1993–2008)	2008	
Ross Robertson		1987	Papatoetoe (1987–1996); Manukau East (1996–2014)	2014	
Sonja Davies		1987	Pencarrow (1987–1993)	1993	
Graham Kelly		1987	Porirua (1987–1996); Mana (1996–2002); List (2002–2003)	2003	
George Hawkins		1990	Manurewa (1990–2011)	2011	
John Blincoe		1990	Nelson (1990–1996)	1996	
Judith Tizard		1990	Panmure (1990–1996); Auckland Central (1996–2008)	2008	Daughter of previous MP
Lianne Dalziel		1990	Christchurch Central (1990–1996); List (1996–1999); Christchurch East (1999–2013)	2013	
Pete Hodgson		1990	Dunedin North (1990–2011)	2011	
Paul Swain		1990	Eastern Hutt (1990–1996); Rimutaka (1996–2008)	2008	
Steve Maharey		1990	Palmerston North (1990–2008)	2008	
Chris Laidlaw		1992	Wellington Central (1992–1993)	1993	First elected in by-election
Chris Carter		1993	Te Atatū (1993–1996); Te Atatū (1999–2010)	2010*	Independent MP 2010–2011
Damien O'Connor		1993	West Coast (1993–1996), West Coast-Tasman (1996–2008); List (2009–2011); West Coast-Tasman(2011–present)	–	
Dianne Yates		1993	Hamilton East (1993–1996); List (1996–2002); Hamilton East (2002–2005); List (2005–2008)	2008	
Janet Mackey		1993	Gisborne (1993–1996); Mahia (1996–1999); East Coast (1999–2005)	2005	
Jill Pettis		1993	Wanganui (1993–2005); List (2005–2008)	2008	
Mark Burton		1993	Tongariro (1993–1996); Taupo (1996–2008)	2008	
Martin Gallagher		1993	Hamilton West (1993–1996); Hamilton West (1999–2008)	2008	
Mark Peck		1993	Invercargill (1993–2005)	2005	
Jill White		1993	Manawatu (1993–1996); List (1996–1998)	1998	
Rick Barker		1993	Hastings (1993–1996); Tukituki (1996–2005); List (2005–2011)	2011	
Ruth Dyson		1993	Lyttelton (1993–1996); List (1996–1999); Banks Peninsula (1999–2008); Port Hills (2008–2020)	2020	
Suzanne Sinclair		1993	Titirangi (1993–1996)	1996	
Taito Phillip Field		1993	Otara (1993–1996); Mangere (1996–2007)	2007*	Independent MP 2007–2008 (Mangere)
Tim Barnett		1996	Christchurch Central (1996–2008)	2008	
Joe Hawke		1996	List (1996–2002)	2002	
Nanaia Mahuta		1996	List (1996–1999), Te Tai Hauāuru (1999–2002); Tainui (2002–2008); Hauraki-Waikato (2008–2023)	2023	
Marian Hobbs		1996	List (1996–1999); Wellington Central (1999–2008)	2008	
Dover Samuels		1996	List (1996–1999); Te Tai Tokerau (1999–2005); List (2005–2008)	2005	
Mark Gosche		1996	List (1996–1999); Maungakiekie (1999–2008)	2008	
Tariana Turia		1996	List (1996–2002); Te Tai Hauāuru (2002–2004)	2004*	Māori Party MP 2004–14
Helen Duncan		1998	List (1998–2005)	2005	
David Benson-Pope		1999	Dunedin South (1999–2008)	2008	
John Tamihere		1999	Hauraki (1999–2002); Tamaki Makaurau (2002–2005)	2005	
Parekura Horomia		1999	Ikaroa-Rawhiti (1999–2013)	2013†	
Ann Hartley		1999	Northcote (1999–2005); List (2005–2008)	2008	
Steve Chadwick		1999	Rotorua (1999–2008); List (2008–2011)	2011	
Mahara Okeroa		1999	Te Tai Tonga (1999–2008)	2008	
David Cunliffe		1999	Titirangi (1999–2002); New Lynn (2002–2017)	2017	Leader of the Opposition (2013–2014)
Mita Ririnui		1999	Waiariki (1999–2005); List (2005–2011)	2011	
Clayton Cosgrove		1999	Waimakariri (1999–2011); List (2011–2017)	2017	
Georgina Beyer		1999	Wairarapa (1999–2005); List (2005–2007)	2007	World's first transgender MP
Margaret Wilson		1999	List (1999–2008)	2008	
Winnie Laban		1999	List (1999–2002); Mana (2002–2010)	2010	
Russell Fairbrother		2002	Napier (2002–2005); List (2005–2008)	2008	
David Parker		2002	Otago (2002–2005); List (2005–2025)	–	
Darren Hughes		2002	Otaki (2002–2008); List (2008–2011)	2011	Resigned
Lynne Pillay		2002	Waitakere (2002–2008); List (2008–2011)	2011	
Dave Hereora		2002	List (2002–2008)	2008	
Ashraf Choudhary		2002	List (2002–2011)	2011	
Moana Mackey		2003	List (2003–2014)	2014	
Lesley Soper		2005	List (2005); List (2007–2008)	2008	
Darien Fenton		2005	List (2005–2014)	2014	
Maryan Street		2005	List (2005–2014)	2014	
Shane Jones		2005	List (2005–2014)	2014	Resigned May 2014, NZ First MP (2017–2020, 2023–present)
Sue Moroney		2005	List (2005–2017)	2017	
Charles Chauvel		2006	List (2006–2013)	2013	
Louisa Wall		2008	List (2008); List (2011); Manurewa (2011–2020); List (2020–2022)	2022	
William Sio		2008	List (2008); Māngere (2008–2023)	2023	
Brendon Burns		2008	Christchurch Central (2008–2011)	2011	
Clare Curran		2008	Dunedin South (2008–2020)	2020	
Iain Lees-Galloway		2008	Palmerston North (2008–2020)	2020	
Chris Hipkins		2008	Remutaka (2008–present)	–	Prime Minister (2023)
Grant Robertson		2008	Wellington Central (2008–2023); List(2023–2024)	2024	
Raymond Huo		2008	List (2008–2014); List (2017–2020)	2020	
Phil Twyford		2008	List (2008–2011); Te Atatū (2011–present)	–	
Carol Beaumont		2008	List (2008–2011); List (2013–2014)	2014	
Kelvin Davis		2008	List (2008–2011, 2014, 2023–2024); Te Tai Tokerau (2014–2023)		
Carmel Sepuloni		2008	List (2008–2011); Kelston (2014–present)	–	Deputy Prime-Minister (2023)
Stuart Nash		2008	List (2008–2011); Napier (2014–2023)	2023	Great-grandson of Walter Nash
Rajen Prasad		2008	List (2008–2014)	2014	
Jacinda Ardern		2008	List (2008–2017); Mt Albert (2017–2023)	2023	Prime Minister (2017–2023), Leader of the Opposition (2017)
David Shearer		2009	Mt Albert (2009–2016)	2016	First elected in by-election, Leader of the Opposition (2011–2013)
Kris Faafoi		2010	Mana (2010–2020); List (2020–2022)	2022	First elected in by-election
David Clark		2011	Dunedin North (2011–2020); Dunedin (2020–2023)	2023	
Andrew Little		2011	List (2011–2023)	2023	Leader of the Opposition (2014–2017)
Rino Tirikatene		2011	Te Tai Tonga (2011–2023); List (2023–2024)	2024	
Megan Woods		2011	Wigram (2011–present)	–	
Meka Whaitiri		2013	Ikaroa-Rāwhiti (2013–2023)	2023*	First elected in by-election, Independent MP 2023
Poto Williams		2013	Christchurch East (2013–2023)	2023	First elected in by-election
Peeni Henare		2014	Tāmaki Makaurau (2014–2023); List (2023–present)	–	
Adrian Rurawhe		2014	Te Tai Hauāuru (2014–2023); List (2023–2026)	–	
Jenny Salesa		2014	Manukau East (2014–2020); Panmure-Otahuhu (2020–present)	–	
Michael Wood		2016	Mount Roskill (2016–2023)	2023	First elected in by-election
Kiri Allan		2017	List (2017–2020); East Coast (2020–2023)	2023	
Ginny Andersen		2017	List (2017–2020, 2023–present); Hutt South (2020–2023)	–	
Tāmati Coffey		2017	Waiariki (2017–2020); List (2020–2023)	2023	
Liz Craig		2017	List (2017–2023)	2023	
Paul Eagle		2017	Rongotai (2017–2023)	2023	
Willie Jackson		2017	List (2017–present)	–	Alliance MP (1999–2002)
Anahila Kanongata'a-Suisuiki		2017	List (2017–2023)	2023	
Marja Lubeck		2017	List (2017–2023)	2023	
Jo Luxton		2017	List (2017–2020, 2023–present); Rangitata (2020–2023)	–	
Kieran McAnulty		2017	List (2017–2020, 2023–present); Wairarapa (2020–2023)	–	
Greg O'Connor		2017	Ohariu (2017–present)	–	
Willow-Jean Prime		2017	List (2017–2020, 2023–present); Northland (2020–2023)	–	
Priyanca Radhakrishnan		2017	List (2017–2020, 2023–); Maungakiekie (2020–2023); List (2023–present)	–	
Deborah Russell		2017	New Lynn (2017–2023); List (2023–present)	–	
Jamie Strange		2017	List (2017–2020); Hamilton East (2020–2023)	2023	
Jan Tinetti		2017	List (2017–present)	–	
Duncan Webb		2017	Christchurch Central (2017–present)	–	
Angie Warren-Clark		2017	List (2017–2023)	2023	
Camilla Belich		2020	List (2020–present)	–	
Glen Bennett		2020	New Plymouth (2020–2023); List (2024–present)	-	
Rachel Boyack		2020	Nelson (2020–present)	–	
Rachel Brooking		2020	List (2020–2023); Dunedin (2023–)	–	
Naisi Chen		2020	List (2020–2023)	2023	
Barbara Edmonds		2020	Mana (2020–present)	–	
Shanan Halbert		2020	Northcote (2020–2023); List (2024–present)	–	
Ingrid Leary		2020	Taieri (2020–present)	–	
Neru Leavasa		2020	Takanini (2020–2023)	2023	
Steph Lewis		2020	Whanganui (2020–2023)	2023	
Anna Lorck		2020	Tukituki (2020–2023)	2023	
Tracey McLellan		2020	Banks Peninsula (2020–2023); List (2024–present)	–	
Terisa Ngobi		2020	Otaki (2020–2023)	2023	
Ibrahim Omer		2020	List (2020–2023)	2023	
Soraya Peke-Mason		2022	List (2020–2023)	2023	
Sarah Pallett		2020	Ilam (2020–2023)	2023	
Angela Roberts		2020	List (2020–2023)	2023	
Gaurav Sharma		2020	Hamilton West (2020–2022)	2022*	Independent MP (2022)
Tangi Utikere		2020	Palmerston North (2020–present)	–	
Ayesha Verrall		2020	List (2020–present)	–	
Vanushi Walters		2020	Upper Harbour (2020–2023); List (2025–present)	-	
Helen White		2020	List (2020–2023); Mt Albert (2023–present)	–	
Arena Williams		2020	Manurewa (2020–present)	–	
Emily Henderson		2020	Whangārei (2020–2023)	2023	
Lemauga Lydia Sosene		2022	List (2022–2023); Māngere (2023–present)	–	
Dan Rosewarne		2022	List (2022–2023, 2026–present)	-	
Reuben Davidson		2023	Christchurch East (2023–present)	–	
Cushla Tangaere-Manuel		2023	Ikaroa Rawhiti (2023–present)	–	
Georgie Dansey		2026	List (2026–present)	–	

== Notes ==
†:Died in office

== Sources ==
- Appendices to the Journals of the House of Representatives, H33 and/or E9, various years. E9's since 1994 are available here.
