= James Clark (Dunedin mayor) =

Former mayor of Dunedin

James Clark CBE
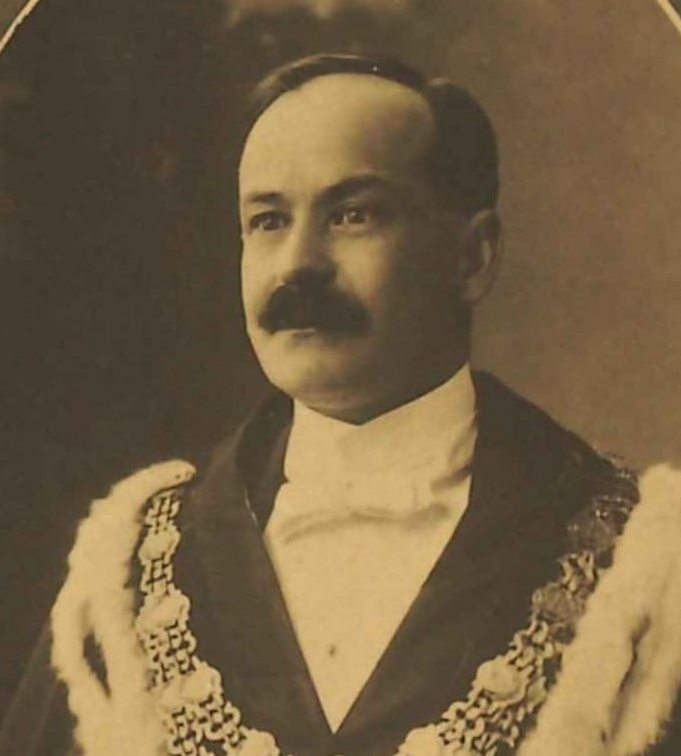

40th Mayor of Dunedin
- In office 1915–1919
- Preceded by: John Shacklock
- Succeeded by: William Begg

Personal details
- Born: James John Clark; 29 July 1870; Riverton, New Zealand
- Died: 20 January 1936 (aged 65); Dunedin, New Zealand

James John Clark CBE (29 July 1870 – 20 January 1936) was a New Zealand politician. He served as mayor of Dunedin from 1915 to 1919.

== Biography ==
Born in Riverton in 1870, Clark was the youngest son of Presbyterian minister Reverend James Clark, and his wife, Margaret Munro Clark. A few months later, the family moved to Palmerston. Clark moved to Dunedin in 1895, where he remained for the rest of his life.

Clark was first elected as a Dunedin city councillor in 1909. He became mayor in 1915, and was the first person to hold the office for four consecutive years. He remained on the city council until 1921, when he did not seek re-election, but again served as a city councillor from 1923 until 1933.

Clark twice stood as the Reform Party candidate for the Dunedin North parliamentary seat. In the 1922 Dunedin North by-election, he finished second, 120 votes behind the Labour candidate, Jim Munro. He stood again at the 1922 general election, but once again lost to Munro, this time by 55 votes.

Other public bodies on which Clark served included the Dunedin Drainage Board, the Ocean Beach Domain Board, the Dunedin Hospital and Charitable Aid Board, and the board of governors of the King Edward Technical College. He was a member of the Otago Patriotic Association from its foundation, serving as its president during his term as Dunedin mayor, and was also a member of the National War Funds Council.

Clark was a prominent Freemason, and was grand master of the New Zealand Grand Lodge in 1929. He was also active in cricket administration, serving as president of both the Otago Cricket Association and the New Zealand Cricket Council.

In the 1918 New Year Honours, Clark was appointed an Officer of the Order of the British Empire, and the following year he was promoted to Commander of the Order of the British Empire, for services in connection with patriotic undertakings, in the 1919 King's Birthday Honours.

Clark died in Dunedin on 20 January 1936, and was buried in the Dunedin Northern Cemetery.

Political offices
Preceded by John Shacklock	Mayor of Dunedin; 1915–1919	Succeeded by William Begg
