= 1922 Dunedin North by-election =

New Zealand by-election

- 21 June 1922
- Turnout: 7,754 (66.34%)
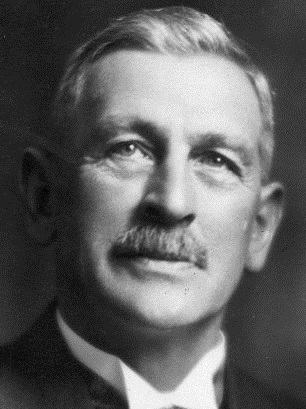

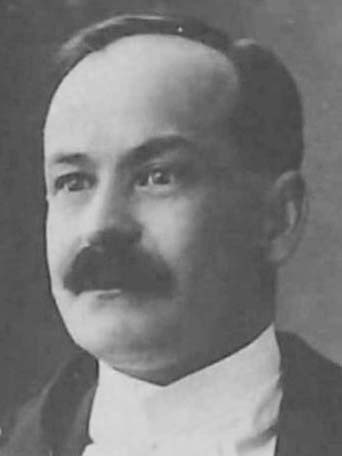

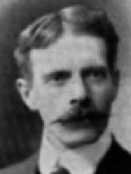
Candidate	Jim Munro	James Clark	William Begg
Party	Labour	Reform	Liberal
Popular vote	3,462	3,342	931
Percentage	44.64%	43.10%	12.00%
Member before election
Edward Kellett
Independent Labour
Elected Member
Jim Munro
Labour

The Dunedin North by-election of 1922 was a by-election held during the 20th New Zealand Parliament in the Dunedin electorate of Dunedin North. This election for the New Zealand Labour Party was significant as, excluding in 1925, Jim Munro would retain the seat until his death in 1945.

== Cause of by-election ==
The by-election was caused by the death of Edward Kellett, the previous Member of Parliament for Dunedin North. Kellett had held Dunedin North since the General election, of 1919. The by-election was won by Labour's Jim Munro.

== Results ==
The following table gives the election results:

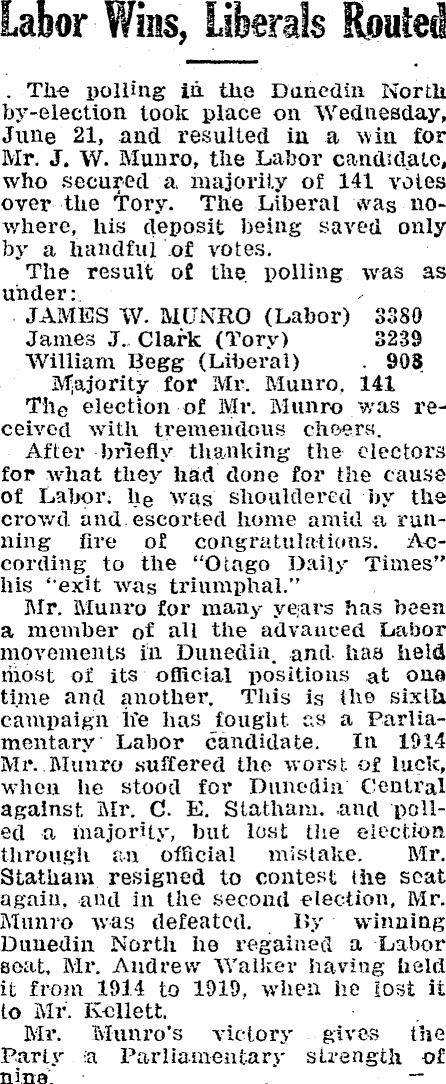
Maoriland Worker excerpt announcing the Labour Party's win

1922 Dunedin North by-election
Party	Candidate	Votes	%	±%
Labour	Jim Munro	3,462	44.64	
Reform	James Clark	3,342	43.10	
Liberal	William Begg	931	12.00	
Informal votes		19	0.24	
Majority		120	1.54	
Turnout		7,754	66.34	
Registered electors		11,687		

== See also ==
- List of New Zealand by-elections
- 1945 Dunedin North by-election
- 1953 North Dunedin by-election
