= Edward Kellett =

Edward Kellett may refer to:

- Edward Kellett (Conservative politician) (1902–1943), British Member of Parliament and British Army officer
- Edward Kellett (New Zealand politician) (1864–1922), New Zealand Member of Parliament for Dunedin North
- Edward Kellett-Bowman (1931–2022), British business consultant and politician
