= Dunedin North (electorate) =

Dunedin North electorate boundaries used between 2014 and 2020

Dunedin North (previously known as North Dunedin) is a former New Zealand parliamentary electorate, which returned one Member of Parliament (MP) to the New Zealand House of Representatives. It was established for the 1905 election and existed until 2020, when it was succeeded by the Dunedin electorate.

It was considered a safe Labour seat, with Labour winning it in every election from 1928, except the 1975 election.

== Population centres ==
Through the City Single Electorates Act, 1903, the three-member electorates of the four main centres were split again, and this became effective at the end of the 15th Parliament and was thus used for the 1905 election. The City of Dunedin electorate was split into the Dunedin Central, Dunedin North, and Dunedin South electorates.

Due to World War II, the 1941 census was postponed. The next census was brought forward to 1945 so that the significant changes in population since the 1936 census could be taken into consideration in a 1946 electoral redistribution prior to the scheduled 1946 general election. At the same time, the Labour government abolished the country quota. The electoral redistribution changed all 76 electorates. When the draft electoral redistribution was released for consultation in early April 1946, it was proposed for the Dunedin North electorate to be abolished and most of its area was supposed to go to a re-created Chalmers electorate. Based on consultation feedback, the Port Chalmers Borough became part of the Oamaru electorate. With such a geographic change, the proposed name of Chalmers electorate was no longer viable and the name changed to North Dunedin electorate instead. Apart from the Port Chalmers Borough going to Oamaru, there was little change in geographic area covered when Dunedin North became North Dunedin. In the 1952 electoral redistribution, the Oamaru electorate expanded further inland and its southern boundary moved north, resulting in the area north of Dunedin Harbour all going to North Dunedin. In the 1957 electoral redistribution, North Dunedin became more rural in nature by expanding towards the north (the Oamaru electorate was split between North Dunedin, Otago Central and Waitaki at this point).

The North Dunedin electorate was renamed Dunedin North in the 1962 electoral redistribution prior to the 1963 election. The character of the electorate changed significantly and it became urban again. In the 1967 electoral redistribution, the North Dunedin electorate moved south, losing the Port Chalmers Borough once more to the re-established Oamaru electorate but gaining area from Dunedin Central. In the 1972 electoral redistribution, Port Chalmers came back to the Dunedin North electorate. There were only minor boundary changes in the 1977 electoral redistribution, but a significant urban shift to the south occurred through the 1983 electoral redistribution, when the Dunedin Central electorate was subsumed by Dunedin North and Dunedin West. There were further boundary changes through the 1987 electoral redistribution.

The 2013 redistribution saw the electorate expand to include Palmerston, Macraes Flat, Moeraki, Hampden and Herbert-Waianakarua. In its final shape from 2014 to 2020, the Dunedin North electorate covered the northern half of the city of Dunedin. It was bordered by Waitaki in the north, Dunedin South in west, south, and south-east, and the Pacific Ocean in the north-east.

The electorate covered what is the equivalent of the Waikouaiti Coast-Chalmers ward of the Dunedin City Council outside the actual urban area of Dunedin. This included the population centre of Waikouaiti, Karitane, Waitati, Seacliff, Warrington, Port Chalmers, Sawyers Bay, Roseneath, and Aramoana.

In urban Dunedin it covered most of northern, central and western Dunedin. This included the city centre and the suburbs of City Rise, Pine Hill, Dunedin North, North East Valley, Opoho, Ravensbourne, Mornington, Roslyn, Maori Hill, Leith Valley, Kaikorai Valley, Brockville, Halfway Bush, and Wakari.

=== Socio-economic make-up ===
A notable influence on voting patterns in the electorate was the location of the University of Otago and Otago Polytechnic in Dunedin North. The electorate has the highest proportion of persons aged 15 to 19 in the country, with 14.1%. It also has the highest proportion of people on a student allowance (8.8%), employed in the education and training industry (11.7%), and employed in the health care and social assistance industry (12.3%).

The Dunedin North electorate has a low rate of enrolment compared to New Zealand as a whole. As of 31 May 2012, 78.4% of the estimate eligible population was enrolled to vote, compared to 92.8% nationally. The figure was brought down by the low number of people aged 18 to 24 enrolled — less than half (47.5%) of the estimated eligible population was enrolled, compared to 75.2% nationally. Enrolments of those aged 25 and over are comparable to the national averages.

== History ==
The first representative was Alfred Richard Barclay, who had previously represented the City of Dunedin electorate. In the 1908 election, he was defeated by G. M. Thomson, who served for two parliamentary terms before being defeated.

Barclay was succeeded by Andrew Walker representing the United Labour Party in the 1914 election. The remnants of United Labour formed the New Zealand Labour Party in 1916 and Walker became the new party's first President. He served for one parliamentary term until the 1919 election, when he was defeated by the Independent Edward Kellett. Kellett died during the parliamentary term on 15 May 1922, and this caused the 1922 by-election, which was won by Jim Munro.

Munro was confirmed at the 1922 general election, but was defeated by Harold Tapley in the 1925 election. Munro in turn defeated Tapley at the 1928 election and then served the electorate until his death on 27 May 1945.

Munro's death caused the 1945 by-election, which was won by Robert Walls. Walls served the electorate until his death on 6 November 1953. This caused the 1953 by-election, which was won by Ethel McMillan, who served the electorate until her retirement in 1975.

McMillan was succeeded by Richard Walls of the National Party in the 1975 election, who held the electorate for one parliamentary term before being defeated by Labour's Stan Rodger in the 1978 election. Rodger retired in 1990 and was succeeded by Pete Hodgson. Hodgson served the electorate until his retirement in 2011. Hodgson was succeeded by David Clark in the 2011 election, when he beat Michael Woodhouse. In the 2014 election, Clark was again successful against Woodhouse and managed to increase his majority.

In the 2019/2020 electoral boundary review, the Electoral Commission added the Otago Peninsula area to the Dunedin North electorate. The electorate's area had to grow as it 5.8% below its population quota, where the maximum allowable quota is capped to 5%. This change in area required the name of the electorate to be changed to Dunedin.

=== Members of Parliament ===
Key

Liberal–Labour Independent Reform United Labour Labour Independent Labour National Green ACT

Election	Winner
1905 election	Alfred Richard Barclay
1908 election	G. M. Thomson
1911 election	G. M. Thomson
1914 election	Andrew Walker
1919 election	Edward Kellett
1922 by-election	Jim Munro
1922 election	Jim Munro
1925 election	Harold Tapley
1928 election	Jim Munro
1931 election	Jim Munro
1935 election	Jim Munro
1938 election	Jim Munro
1943 election	Jim Munro
1945 by-election	Robert Walls
1946 election	Robert Walls
1949 election	Robert Walls
1951 election	Robert Walls
1953 by-election	Ethel McMillan
1954 election	Ethel McMillan
1957 election	Ethel McMillan
1960 election	Ethel McMillan
1963 election	Ethel McMillan
1966 election	Ethel McMillan
1969 election	Ethel McMillan
1972 election	Ethel McMillan
1975 election	Richard Walls
1978 election	Stan Rodger
1981 election	Stan Rodger
1984 election	Stan Rodger
1987 election	Stan Rodger
1990 election	Pete Hodgson
1993 election	Pete Hodgson
1996 election	Pete Hodgson
1999 election	Pete Hodgson
2002 election	Pete Hodgson
2005 election	Pete Hodgson
2008 election	Pete Hodgson
2011 election	David Clark
2014 election	David Clark
2017 election	David Clark
(Electorate abolished in 2020; see Dunedin)

=== List MPs ===
Members of Parliament elected from party lists in elections where that person also unsuccessfully contested the Dunedin North electorate. Unless otherwise stated, all MPs terms began and ended at general elections.

Election	Winner
1999 election	Katherine Rich
2002 election	Katherine Rich
2005 election	Katherine Rich
2008 election	Metiria Turei
2008 election	Michael Woodhouse
2010	Hilary Calvert (Note: Hilary Calvert entered parliament as a list MP on 24 September 2010 after David Garrett resigned.)
2011 election	Metiria Turei
2011 election	Michael Woodhouse
2014 election	Metiria Turei
2014 election	Michael Woodhouse
2017 election	Michael Woodhouse

== Election results ==
=== 2017 election ===
2017 general election: Dunedin North
Notes:	Blue background denotes the winner of the electorate vote. Pink background denotes a candidate elected from their party list. Yellow background denotes an electorate win by a list member, or other incumbent. A ✓ or ✗ denotes status of any incumbent, win or lose respectively.						
Party	Candidate	Votes	%	±%	Party votes	%	±%
Labour	✓ David Clark	21,259	57.48	+10.08	17,808	47.63	+15.81
National	Michael Woodhouse	9,505	25.70	−4.51	10,382	27.77	−4.49
Green	Niki Bould	3,053	8.25	−9.12	5,110	13.67	−9.27
Opportunities	Abe Gray	1,645	4.45	—	1,535	4.11	—
NZ First	Warren Voight	1,069	2.89	—	1,899	5.08	+1.67
ACT	Sam Purchas	150	0.40	—	157	0.41	+0.09
Independent	Adrian Daegal Graamans	71	0.19	−0.12			
Independent	Stan Lusby	38	0.01	−0.17			
Māori Party					108	0.29	−0.06
Legalise Cannabis					89	0.24	−0.25
Conservative					60	0.16	−2.57
Ban 1080					55	0.15	−0.02
United Future					20	0.08	−0.17
People's Party					17	0.05	—
Democrats					15	0.04	−0.07
Outdoors					14	0.04	—
Mana Party					11	0.03	—
Internet					10	0.03	—
Informal votes		195			86		
Total valid votes		36,985			37,385		
Labour hold	Majority	11,754	31.78	+11.92			

=== 2014 election ===
2014 general election: Dunedin North
Notes:	Blue background denotes the winner of the electorate vote. Pink background denotes a candidate elected from their party list. Yellow background denotes an electorate win by a list member, or other incumbent. A ✓ or ✗ denotes status of any incumbent, win or lose respectively.						
Party	Candidate	Votes	%	±%	Party votes	%	±%
Labour	✓ David Clark	16,315	47.40	+3.15	11,147	31.82	−1.98
National	Michael Woodhouse	10,398	30.21	−2.14	11,302	32.26	−0.13
Green	Metiria Turei	5,978	17.37	−2.14	8,035	22.94	−0.45
Conservative	Jonathan Daley	621	1.80	+1.80	956	2.73	+1.38
Legalise Cannabis	Abe Gray	580	1.69	+0.33	172	0.49	−0.08
Internet	Rob Stewart	255	0.74	+0.74			
Independent	Adrian Daegal Graamans	106	0.31	+0.31			
Democrats	Miriam Mowat	159	0.31	−0.36	37	0.11	−0.10
Independent	Stan Lusby	62	0.18	+0.18			
NZ First					2,364	6.75	+1.06
Internet Mana					603	1.72	+1.12 (Note: 2014 Internet Mana swing is relative to the votes for Mana in 2011; it shared a party list with Internet in the 2014 election.)
Māori Party					124	0.35	−0.07
ACT					111	0.32	−0.41
United Future					86	0.25	−0.29
Ban 1080					60	0.17	+0.17
Civilian					27	0.08	+0.08
Independent Coalition					7	0.02	+0.02
Focus					1	0.00	+0.00
Informal votes		216			99		
Total valid votes		34,636			35,131		
Turnout		35,230	79.88	+11.50			
Labour hold	Majority	5,917	17.19	+5.29			

=== 2011 election ===
2011 general election: Dunedin North
Notes:	Blue background denotes the winner of the electorate vote. Pink background denotes a candidate elected from their party list. Yellow background denotes an electorate win by a list member, or other incumbent. A ✓ or ✗ denotes status of any incumbent, win or lose respectively.						
Party	Candidate	Votes	%	±%	Party votes	%	±%
Labour	David Clark	12,976	44.25	−8.37	10,127	33.80	−10.44
National	Michael Woodhouse	9,487	32.35	+1.71	9,707	32.39	+3.04
Green	Metiria Turei	5,721	19.51	+8.42	7,010	23.39	+7.58
Legalise Cannabis	Julian Crawford	398	1.36	−0.13	172	0.57	+0.14
Alliance	Victor Billot	210	0.72	−0.66	50	0.17	−0.15
Democrats	Jeremy Noble	196	0.67	+0.35	62	0.21	+0.10
United Future	Peter George	176	0.60	−0.10	183	0.61	−0.33
ACT	Guy McCallum	159	0.54	−1.22	218	0.73	−1.54
NZ First					1,706	5.69	+2.27
Conservative					405	1.35	+1.35
Mana					181	0.60	+0.60
Māori Party					126	0.42	−0.28
Libertarianz					18	0.06	+0.03
Informal votes		448			190		
Total valid votes		29,323			29,965		
Labour hold	Majority	3,489	11.90	−10.09			

Electorate (as at 26 November 2011): 40,356

=== 2008 election ===
2008 general election: Dunedin North
Notes:	Blue background denotes the winner of the electorate vote. Pink background denotes a candidate elected from their party list. Yellow background denotes an electorate win by a list member, or other incumbent. A ✓ or ✗ denotes status of any incumbent, win or lose respectively.						
Party	Candidate	Votes	%	±%	Party votes	%	±%
Labour	✓ Pete Hodgson	17,127	52.62	−2.46	14,608	44.24	−10.58
National	Michael Woodhouse	9,972	30.64	−0.79	9,692	29.35	+4.21
Green	Metiria Turei	3,611	11.09	+3.64	5,221	15.81	+4.99
ACT	Hilary Calvert	573	1.76	+1.15	749	2.27	+1.28
Legalise Cannabis	Julian Crawford	483	1.48	−0.06	143	0.43	+0.14
Alliance	Victor Billot	448	1.38	+0.54	106	0.32	+0.12
United Future	Mary Edwards	228	0.70	−1.32	312	0.94	−1.82
Democrats	Olive McRae	105	0.32	+0.32	36	0.11	+0.05
NZ First					1,132	3.43	+0.58
Progressive					310	0.94	−1.38
Bill and Ben					252	0.76	+0.76
Māori Party					230	0.70	+0.41
Kiwi					125	0.38	+0.38
Family Party					57	0.17	+0.17
Workers Party					18	0.05	+0.05
Pacific					14	0.04	+0.04
Libertarianz					9	0.03	−0.01
RAM					4	0.01	+0.01
RONZ					2	0.01	−0.01
Informal votes		234			89		
Total valid votes		32,547			33,020		
Labour hold	Majority	7,155	21.98	−1.67			

=== 2005 election ===
2005 general election: Dunedin North
Notes:	Blue background denotes the winner of the electorate vote. Pink background denotes a candidate elected from their party list. Yellow background denotes an electorate win by a list member, or other incumbent. A ✓ or ✗ denotes status of any incumbent, win or lose respectively.						
Party	Candidate	Votes	%	±%	Party votes	%	±%
Labour	✓ Pete Hodgson	17,769	55.08	−4.42	17,915	54.82	+5.11
National	Katherine Rich	10,139	31.02	+7.94	8,217	25.14	+8.95
Green	Philippa Jamieson	2,405	7.46	+0.59	3,536	10.82	−1.54
United Future	Mark Peters	652	2.02	−0.34	901	2.76	−2.78
Legalise Cannabis	Jason Baker-Sherman	498	1.54	−0.51	95	0.29	−0.42
Progressive	James Boyack	330	1.02	−0.02	431	1.32	−0.65
Alliance	Victor Billot	270	0.84	−1.14	65	0.20	−2.89
ACT	Willie Martin	196	0.61	−1.15	322	0.99	−3.20
NZ First					931	2.85	−1.61
Māori Party					96	0.29	+0.29
Destiny					78	0.24	+0.24
Christian Heritage					35	0.11	−0.72
Democrats					21	0.06	+0.06
Libertarianz					14	0.04	+0.04
99 MP					10	0.03	+0.03
Direct Democracy					4	0.01	+0.01
One NZ					4	0.01	−0.04
RONZ					4	0.01	+0.01
Family Rights					3	0.01	+0.01
Informal votes		241			71		
Total valid votes		32,259			32,682		
Labour hold	Majority	7,630	23.65	−12.36			

=== 2002 election ===
2002 general election: Dunedin North
Notes:	Blue background denotes the winner of the electorate vote. Pink background denotes a candidate elected from their party list. Yellow background denotes an electorate win by a list member, or other incumbent. A ✓ or ✗ denotes status of any incumbent, win or lose respectively.						
Party	Candidate	Votes	%	±%	Party votes	%	±%
Labour	✓ Pete Hodgson	17,573	59.50	−0.88	14,866	49.71	+1.83
National	Katherine Rich	6,936	23.49	−3.76	4,841	16.19	−4.26
Green	Philippa Direen	2,028	6.87	+2.65	3,697	12.36	+4.93
United Future	Todd Whitcombe	697	2.36	+2.36	1,658	5.54	+5.54
Legalise Cannabis	Paul John McMullan	606	2.05	+0.13	212	0.71	+0.71
Alliance	Carolyn Payne-Harker	586	1.98	−4.32	924	3.09	−9.32
ACT	Willie Martin	520	1.76	−1.17	1,254	4.19	−0.53
Progressive	Frede Jorgensen	306	1.04	+1.04	588	1.97	+1.97
Christian Heritage	Glenn Peoples	280	0.95	−0.94	248	0.83	+0.83
NZ First					1,333	4.46	+3.74
ORNZ					253	0.85	+0.85
One NZ					15	0.05	+0.05
Mana Māori					9	0.03	+0.03
NMP					6	0.02	+0.02
Informal votes		291			99		
Total valid votes		29,532			29,904		
Turnout		29,904	79.1				
Labour hold	Majority	10,637	36.01	−4.64			

=== 1999 election ===
1999 general election: Dunedin North
Notes:	Blue background denotes the winner of the electorate vote. Pink background denotes a candidate elected from their party list. Yellow background denotes an electorate win by a list member, or other incumbent. A ✓ or ✗ denotes status of any incumbent, win or lose respectively.						
Party	Candidate	Votes	%	±%	Party votes	%	±%
Labour	✓ Pete Hodgson	18,856	60.38		15,052	47.88	
National	Katherine Rich	6,161	19.73		6,427	20.45	
Alliance	Quentin Findlay	1,968	6.30		3,902	12.41	
Green	Michael Tritt	1,318	4.22		2,336	7.43	
ACT	Hilary Calvert	915	2.93		1,485	4.72	
Legalise Cannabis	Paul John McMullan	599	1.92		397	1.26	
Christian Heritage	David Harris	589	1.89		651	2.07	
South Island	Alan McDonald	404	1.29		216	0.69	
NZ First	Donna Waipouri-Baxter	224	0.72		401	1.28	
McGillicuddy Serious	Bernard Smith	152	0.49		46	0.15	
NMP	Patrick Byrne	41	0.13		28	0.09	
Christian Democrats					185	0.59	
United NZ					151	0.48	
Libertarianz					64	0.20	
Animals First					49	0.16	
Natural Law					15	0.05	
One NZ					12	0.04	
Mana Māori					9	0.03	
Freedom Movement					6	0.02	
The People's Choice					2	0.006	
Mauri Pacific					1	0.003	
Republican					0	0.00	
Informal votes		384			176		
Total valid votes		31,227			31,435		
Labour hold	Majority	12,695	40.65				

=== 1996 election ===
1996 general election: Dunedin North
Notes:	Blue background denotes the winner of the electorate vote. Pink background denotes a candidate elected from their party list. Yellow background denotes an electorate win by a list member, or other incumbent. A ✓ or ✗ denotes status of any incumbent, win or lose respectively.						
Party	Candidate	Votes	%	±%	Party votes	%	±%
Labour	✓ Pete Hodgson	17,375	52.32		13,449	40.15	
National	Margie Stevens	7,168	21.58		8,304	24.79	
Alliance	Jim Flynn	4,488	13.51		4,648	13.88	
NZ First	Neil Benson	1,824	5.49		2,224	6.64	
ACT	Michael Steeneveld	1,157	3.48		1,452	4.33	
United NZ	Graeme Brown	553	1.67		718	2.14	
McGillicuddy Serious	Doug Mackie	453	1.36		120	0.36	
Natural Law	Mary-Anne McGregor	193	0.58		56	0.17	
Christian Coalition					1,198	3.58	
Legalise Cannabis					1,100	3.28	
Animals First					75	0.22	
Progressive Green					63	0.19	
Green Society					28	0.08	
Mana Māori					20	0.06	
Ethnic Minority Party					12	0.04	
Asia Pacific United					8	0.02	
Superannuitants & Youth					7	0.02	
Libertarianz					6	0.02	
Conservatives					5	0.01	
Advance New Zealand					4	0.01	
Te Tawharau					0	0.00	
Informal votes		386			100		
Total valid votes		33,211			33,497		
Labour hold	Majority	10,207	30.73				

=== 1993 election ===
1993 general election: Dunedin North
Party	Candidate	Votes	%	±%
Labour	Pete Hodgson	9,119	43.52	−2.77
National	Hugh Perkins	5,325	25.41	
Alliance	Jim Flynn	5,022	23.97	
NZ First	Eileen Rodriguez	776	3.70	
Christian Heritage	Louise Storm	368	1.75	
McGillicuddy Serious	Murray Kennedy	267	1.27	
Natural Law	Leigh Bush	73	0.34	
Majority		3,794	18.10	+7.08
Turnout		20,950	85.52	−1.08
Registered electors		24,495		

=== 1990 election ===
1990 general election: Dunedin North
Party	Candidate	Votes	%	±%
Labour	Pete Hodgson	9,807	46.29	
National	Gael Donoghue	7,471	35.26	
Green	Antony Deaker	2,228	10.51	+8.30
NewLabour	Chris Trotter	1,127	5.31	
McGillicuddy Serious	Daryl Aylward	181	0.85	
Social Credit	Graeme Mason	148	0.69	
Democrats	George Goddard	146	0.68	
NZ Party	A Blackadder	68	0.32	
Communist League	Stan Lusby	10	0.04	
Majority		2,336	11.02	
Turnout		21,186	86.60	−0.64
Registered electors		24,462		

=== 1987 election ===
1987 general election: Dunedin North
Party	Candidate	Votes	%	±%
Labour	Stan Rodger	12,565	62.30	+10.24
National	Sean Davison	6,031	29.90	
Democrats	Jack Begley	725	3.59	
Independent	Antony Deaker	446	2.21	
Wizard Party	W P Everson	178	0.88	+0.17
McGillicuddy Serious	W J Gumbley	148	0.73	
Ind. NZ Party	Murray Menzies	75	0.37	+0.10
Majority		6,534	32.39	+8.04
Turnout		20,168	87.24	−4.07
Registered electors		23,116		

=== 1984 election ===
1984 general election: Dunedin North
Party	Candidate	Votes	%	±%
Labour	Stan Rodger	10,964	52.06	−1.76
National	Barbara Henderson	5,835	27.70	
NZ Party	Lee Vandervis	3,010	14.29	
Social Credit	Craig Paddon	966	4.58	
Wizard Party	W P Everson	151	0.71	−0.20
Independent	C A Nixon	74	0.35	
Ind. NZ Party	Murray Menzies	58	0.27	
Majority		5,129	24.35	+1.02
Turnout		21,058	91.31	+2.27
Registered electors		23,062		

=== 1981 election ===
1981 general election: Dunedin North
Party	Candidate	Votes	%	±%
Labour	Stan Rodger	10,039	53.82	+5.23
National	Des Bleach	5,606	30.05	
Social Credit	Hamish Woods	2,835	15.20	
Wizard Party	W P Everson	171	0.91	
Majority		4,733	25.37	+11.42
Turnout		18,651	89.04	+19.97
Registered electors		20,946		

=== 1978 election ===
1978 general election: Dunedin North
Party	Candidate	Votes	%	±%
Labour	Stan Rodger	9,846	48.19	
National	Richard Walls	6,996	34.24	−9.95
Social Credit	M J Sheppard	2,228	10.90	
Values	P R J Brook	799	3.91	
Independent	John O'Neill	559	2.73	
Majority		2,850	13.95	
Turnout		20,428	69.07	−14.89
Registered electors		29,573		

=== 1975 election ===
1975 general election: Dunedin North
Party	Candidate	Votes	%	±%
National	Richard Walls	8,740	44.19	
Labour	Brian Arnold	7,782	39.34	
Values	Peter Sutton	2,075	10.49	
Social Credit	Ivan Harper	1,180	5.96	
Majority		958	4.84	
Turnout		19,777	83.96	−6.02
Registered electors		23,553		

=== 1972 election ===
1972 general election: Dunedin North
Party	Candidate	Votes	%	±%
Labour	Ethel McMillan	9,211	53.91	−0.91
National	John Wallis	5,191	30.38	
Values	Geoff Neill	1,801	10.54	
Social Credit	Joy Clapham	830	4.85	
New Democratic	Patrick James Pullar	51	0.29	
Majority		4,020	23.53	+5.12
Turnout		17,084	89.98	+2.03
Registered electors		18,985		

=== 1969 election ===
1969 general election: Dunedin North
Party	Candidate	Votes	%	±%
Labour	Ethel McMillan	8,721	54.82	+2.29
National	Iona Williams	5,729	36.01	
Social Credit	A W Fagg	1,129	7.09	−6.25
Democratic Labour	Jamie Wedderspoon	224	1.40	
Independent	J C M McPhee	103	0.64	
Majority		2,929	18.41	−0.01
Turnout		15,906	87.65	+1.60
Registered electors		18,147		

=== 1966 election ===
1966 general election: Dunedin North
Party	Candidate	Votes	%	±%
Labour	Ethel McMillan	8,079	52.53	−0.99
National	George Barry Gerard	5,246	34.11	
Social Credit	A W Fagg	2,052	13.34	
Majority		2,833	18.42	+2.74
Turnout		15,377	86.05	−3.96
Registered electors		17,869		

=== 1963 election ===
1963 general election: Dunedin North
Party	Candidate	Votes	%	±%
Labour	Ethel McMillan	8,566	53.22	−0.79
National	Edgar Whittleston	6,042	37.54	
Social Credit	George William Goddard	1,370	8.51	−0.42
Communist	Edgar Wilson Hunter	116	0.72	+0.21
Majority		2,524	15.68	−1.80
Turnout		16,094	90.01	−0.64
Registered electors		17,879		

=== 1960 election ===
1960 general election: Dunedin North
Party	Candidate	Votes	%	±%
Labour	Ethel McMillan	7,645	54.01	−3.41
National	Brenda Bell	5,170	36.52	
Social Credit	George William Goddard	1,265	8.93	
Communist	Edgar Wilson Hunter	73	0.51	
Majority		2,475	17.48	−5.23
Turnout		14,153	90.65	−3.12
Registered electors		15,612		

=== 1957 election ===
1957 general election: Dunedin North
Party	Candidate	Votes	%	±%
Labour	Ethel McMillan	8,616	57.42	+6.38
National	George Terry	5,208	34.71	
Social Credit	Patrick McMullan	1,108	7.38	−11.07
Majority		3,408	22.71	+1.95
Turnout		15,004	93.77	+2.51
Registered electors		16,000		

=== 1954 election ===
1954 general election: Dunedin North
Party	Candidate	Votes	%	±%
Labour	Ethel McMillan	6,860	51.04	−10.92
National	Helen Black	4,069	30.27	
Social Credit	Patrick McMullan	2,480	18.45	
Majority		2,791	20.76	−3.16
Turnout		13,438	91.26	+20.85
Registered electors		14,724		

=== 1953 by-election ===
1953 North Dunedin by-election
Party	Candidate	Votes	%	±%
Labour	Ethel McMillan	6,424	61.96	
National	Walter MacDougall	3,944	38.04	
Majority		2,480	23.92	
Turnout		10,368	70.41	−21.62
Registered electors		14,724		

=== 1951 election ===
1951 general election: Dunedin North
Party	Candidate	Votes	%	±%
Labour	Robert Walls	6,929	51.13	−0.89
National	Donald Cameron	6,622	48.86	
Majority		307	2.26	−2.57
Turnout		13,551	92.03	−3.04
Registered electors		14,724		

=== 1949 election ===
1949 general election: Dunedin North
Party	Candidate	Votes	%	±%
Labour	Robert Walls	7,190	52.02	−2.61
National	Richard Brickell	6,522	47.18	
Communist	John Leslie Marston	109	0.78	
Majority		668	4.83	−4.43
Turnout		13,821	95.07	+3.27
Registered electors		14,537		

=== 1946 election ===
1946 general election: Dunedin North
Party	Candidate	Votes	%	±%
Labour	Robert Walls	7,487	54.63	+2.09
National	Norman Jones	6,217	45.36	−1.73
Majority		1,270	9.26	+3.82
Turnout		13,704	91.80	+12.03
Registered electors		14,927		

=== 1945 by-election ===
1945 Dunedin North by-election
Party	Candidate	Votes	%	±%
Labour	Robert Walls	6,791	52.54	
National	Norman Jones	6,087	47.09	
Informal votes		46	0.35	−0.50
Majority		704	5.44	
Turnout		12,924	79.77	−11.99
Registered electors		16,200		

=== 1943 election ===
1943 general election: Dunedin North
Party	Candidate	Votes	%	±%
Labour	Jim Munro	8,038	55.82	
National	Alexander Cassie	5,240	36.39	
People's Movement	Frederick Allan Keane	858	5.95	
Democratic Labour	Cornelius Machin Ross	263	1.82	
Informal votes		123	0.85	
Majority		2,798	19.43	
Turnout		14,399	91.76	
Registered electors		15,691		

=== 1935 election ===
1935 general election: Dunedin North
Party	Candidate	Votes	%	±%
Labour	Jim Munro	6,097	52.56	+0.30
United	Alexander Smith Falconer	4,429	38.18	
Democrat	Helen Black	1,073	9.25	
Majority		1,668	14.38	+9.42
Informal votes		97	0.83	−0.19
Turnout		11,696	92.65	+4.81
Registered electors		12,624		

=== 1931 election ===
1931 general election: Dunedin North
Party	Candidate	Votes	%	±%
Labour	Jim Munro	5,518	52.26	
United	John McCrae (Note: John McCrae was the official candidate for the United–Reform Coalition)	4,994	47.30	
United	Robert Black (Note: Robert Black, who was not endorsed by the United Party, withdrew just before the election)	46	0.44	
Majority		524	4.96	
Informal votes		109	1.02	
Turnout		10,667	87.84	
Registered electors		12,144		

=== 1928 election ===
1928 general election: Dunedin North
Party	Candidate	Votes	%	±%
Labour	Jim Munro	4,352	40.93	
Reform	Harold Tapley	3,121	29.35	
United	Charles Robert Smith	2,638	24.81	
Independent	George Samuel Thomson	523	4.92	
Majority		1,231	11.58	
Informal votes		81	0.76	
Turnout		10,715	89.58	
Registered electors		11,962		

=== 1922 by-election ===
1922 Dunedin North by-election
Party	Candidate	Votes	%	±%
Labour	Jim Munro	3,462	44.64	
Reform	James Clark	3,342	43.10	
Liberal	William Begg	931	12.00	
Informal votes		19	0.24	
Majority		120	1.54	
Turnout		7,754	66.34	
Registered electors		11,687		

=== 1914 election ===
1914 general election
Party	Candidate	Votes	%	±%
United Labour	Andrew Walker	4,073	51.47	
Reform	George Malcolm Thomson	3,751	47.40	
Majority		322	4.06	
Informal votes		88	1.11	
Turnout		7,912	81.34	
Registered electors		9,726		
