= Tom Paul (politician) =

Compositor, trade unionist and politician (1874–1964)

The Honourable Tom Paul CBE
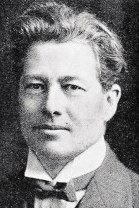

Member of the New Zealand Legislative Council
- In office 9 September 1946 – 31 December 1950
- Appointed by: Peter Fraser
- In office 22 January 1907 – 25 November 1919
- Appointed by: Sir Joseph Ward

3rd President of the Labour Party
- In office 11 July 1918 – 12 July 1920
- Vice President: Michael Joseph Savage; Peter Fraser
- Leader: Alfred Hindmarsh†; Harry Holland
- Preceded by: Andrew Walker
- Succeeded by: Peter Fraser

Personal details
- Born: 16 August 1874 Boort, Victoria, Australia
- Died: 25 July 1964 (aged 89) Raumati South, New Zealand
- Party: Labour Party; United Labour Party; IPLL

John Thomas Paul CBE (16 August 1874 – 25 July 1964) was a New Zealand compositor, trade unionist, politician, editor, journalist and censor.

== Biography ==
Paul was born in Boort, Victoria, Australia in 1874. He came to New Zealand in 1899.

Paul was a journalist and printer and became President of the Otago Typographical Workers Union in 1902.

He was appointed to the New Zealand Legislative Council on 22 January 1907. At the expiry of his term, he was reappointed on 22 January 1914, but resigned on 25 November 1919 to stand for Labour in the general election after the popular Thomas Sidey had announced that he would retire from the Dunedin South electorate. He was appointed again on 9 September 1946 and served until the abolition of the Legislative Council on 31 December 1950; thus serving for sixteen years in total.

He was deeply involved with the early development of the Labour Party, from establishing the Independent Political Labour League via the original New Zealand Labour Party and the United Labour Party to the current Labour Party formed in 1916. He was New Zealand Labour Party president 1918 to 1920, and stood as Labour Party candidate for Dunedin South in 1919; losing by only 84 votes against Thomas Sidey of the Liberal Party; he did not stand for parliament again.

He was also involved in the WEA (Workers' Educational Association), and was vice-president of the NZ Land Values League which expoused Georgist policies. He was pro-conscription in World War I.

In the 1958 New Year Honours, Paul was appointed a Commander of the Order of the British Empire, for services in the fields of journalism and government.

For many years, he looked after his ailing wife, who died in 1961. Paul died on 25 July 1964 at Raumati on the Kāpiti Coast. He was survived by their two sons.

== Notes ==
Party political offices
Preceded by Andrew Walker	President of the Labour Party; 1918–1920	Succeeded by Peter Fraser
