= Livingstone Tapley =

New Zealand politician

Harold Livingstone Tapley CMG
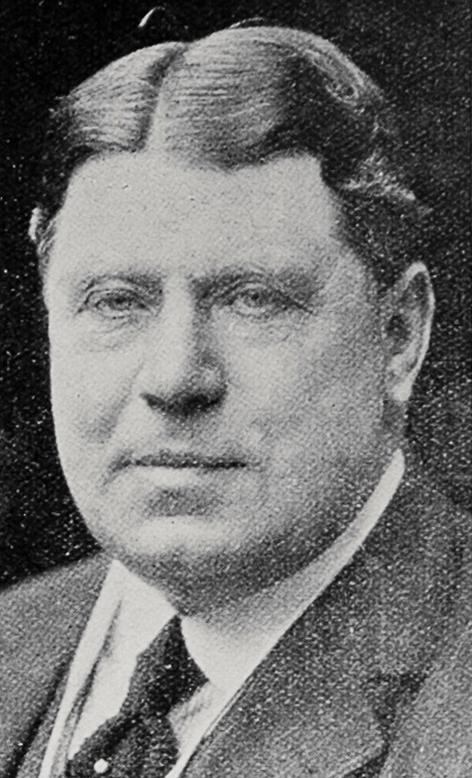
- Tapley, c. 1926

43nd Mayor of Dunedin
- In office 1923–1927
- Preceded by: James Douglas
- Succeeded by: William Taverner

Member of the New Zealand Parliament for Dunedin North
- In office 1925–1928
- Preceded by: Jim Munro
- Succeeded by: Jim Munro

Personal details
- Born: Harold Livingstone Tapley; 25 January 1875 Semaphore, South Australia, Australia
- Died: 21 December 1932 (aged 57) Dunedin, New Zealand
- Spouse: Jean Brodie Burt (m. 1900; died 1927)
- Relatives: Colin Tapley (son)
- Occupation: Shipping agent

Harold Livingstone Tapley CMG (25 January 1875 – 21 December 1932), styled as H. Livingstone Tapley was a New Zealand politician of the Reform Party.

New Zealand Parliament
Years	Term	Electorate	Party
1925–1928	22nd	Dunedin North	Reform

Born in Semaphore, South Australia in 1875, Tapley emigrated to Dunedin in 1893.

He represented Dunedin North in Parliament from 1925 to 1928, when he was defeated.

He was the Mayor of Dunedin from 1923 to 1927. He was appointed a Companion of the Order of St Michael and St George in the 1926 King's Birthday Honours.

Political offices
Preceded by James Douglas	Mayor of Dunedin; 1923–1927	Succeeded by William Taverner
New Zealand Parliament
Preceded by Jim Munro	Member of Parliament for Dunedin North; 1925–1928	Succeeded by Jim Munro
