= Shadow Cabinet of Norman Kirk =

New Zealand shadow cabinet (1965–1972)

New Zealand political leader Norman Kirk assembled a "shadow cabinet" system amongst the Labour caucus following his elevation to become Leader of the Opposition in 1965. However, he found it challenging to avoid it being composed mainly of Auckland and Christchurch MPs.

As the Labour Party formed the largest party not in government, the frontbench team was as a result the Official Opposition of the New Zealand House of Representatives.

== Frontbench team ==
The list below contains a list of Kirk's spokespeople and their respective roles:

| Rank | Shadow Minister | Portfolio/s |
|---|---|---|
| 1 | Norman Kirk | Leader of the Opposition; Shadow Minister of Foreign Affairs |
| 2 | Hon Hugh Watt | Deputy Leader of the Opposition; Shadow Minister of Works; Shadow Minister of Electricity |
| 3 | Bob Tizard | Shadow Minister of Finance; Shadow Minister of Statistics |
| 4 | Bill Rowling | Shadow Minister of Overseas Trade; Shadow Minister of Marketing; Shadow Minister of Broadcasting; Shadow Minister of Mines |
| 5 | Norman Douglas | Shadow Minister of Labour; Shadow Minister of Immigration; Shadow Minister of State Services |
| 6 | Matiu Rata | Shadow Minister of Maori Affairs; Shadow Minister of Fisheries; Shadow Minister of Forests |
| 7 | Norman King | Shadow Minister of Social Welfare; Shadow Minister for Youth; Shadow Minister for Recreation |
| 8 | Warren Freer | Shadow Minister of Industries & Commerce; Shadow Minister of Customs |
| 9 | Phil Amos | Shadow Minister of Education; Shadow Minister of Science; Shadow Minister of Arts |
| 10 | Arthur Faulkner | Shadow Minister of Defence; Shadow Minister of Island Territories |
| 11 | Martyn Finlay | Shadow Attorney-General; Shadow Minister of Justice; Shadow Minister of Police |
| 12 | Bill Fraser | Shadow Minister of Housing; Shadow Postmaster-General |
| 13 | Colin Moyle | Shadow Minister of Agriculture; Shadow Minister of Lands |
| 14 | Stan Whitehead | Shadow Minister of Internal Affairs; Shadow Minister of Local Government; Shadow Minister for Civil Defence |
| 15 | Hon John Mathison | Shadow Minister of Transport; Shadow Minister of Marine; Shadow Minister of Railways; Shadow Minister of Tourism |
| 16 | Ethel McMillan | Shadow Minister of Health |
| 17 | Joe Walding | Shadow Minister of the Environment; Shadow Minister of Conservation |
| 18 | Mick Connelly | Shadow Minister of Racing |
