= 1945 Dunedin North by-election =

New Zealand by-election

- 21 July 1945
- Turnout: 12,924 (79.77%)
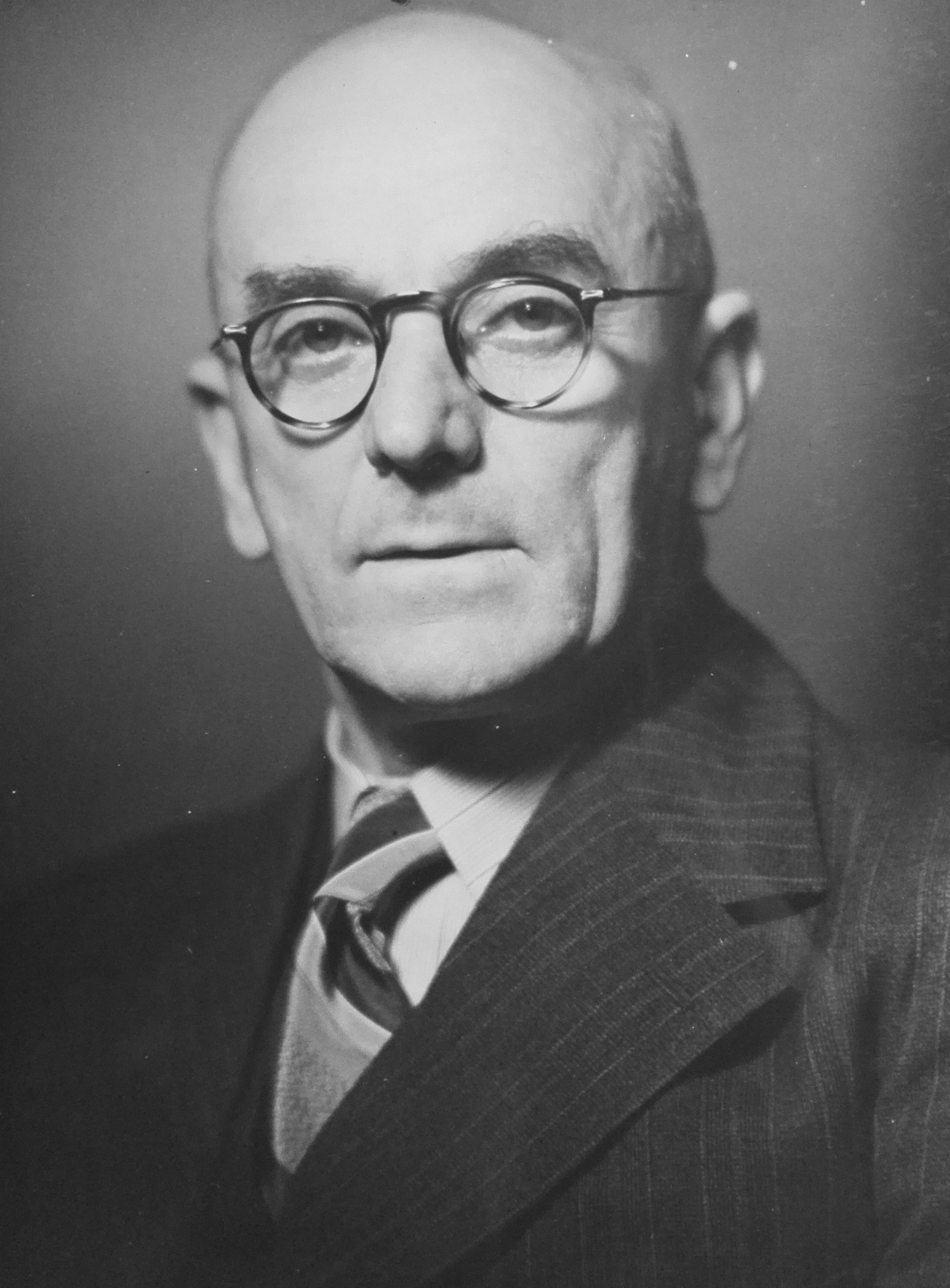

Candidate	Robert Walls	Norman Jones
Party	Labour	National
Popular vote	6,791	6,087
Percentage	52.54	47.09
Member before election
James W. Munro
Labour
Elected Member
Robert Walls
Labour

The 1945 Dunedin North by-election was a by-election held during the 27th New Zealand Parliament in the Dunedin electorate of Dunedin North. The by-election occurred following the death of MP James W. Munro and was won by Robert Walls.

== Background ==
Munro, who was first elected to represent Dunedin North for the Labour Party in 1922, died on 27 May 1945. This triggered the Dunedin North by-election, which was contested by Robert Walls for Labour, and Norman Jones for National. Walls obtained 53.1% of the votes and was successful. Walls represented Dunedin North until his death in 1953, and the Labour Party would go on to hold the electorate until 1975.

There was talk of John A. Lee standing as a Democratic Labour (DLP) candidate as soon as the seat fell vacant, though no nomination either on his behalf or another DLP candidate was received before nominations closed.

It was the first time that Jones contested an election; he contested six more elections unsuccessfully before he was finally successful in the Invercargill electorate 30 years later.

The by-election was held soon after the 1945 Hamilton by-election, when National had campaigned on withdrawing New Zealand troops from Italy and restricting New Zealand's role in the Pacific War to food supply, though Labour wanted to keep New Zealand troops in the Pacific to "have a say" in the peace. But Peter Fraser wanted to contribute to a Commonwealth force against Japan. He met the Opposition leaders Sidney Holland and Adam Hamilton; noting the divisions in his own caucus. Holland agreed with Fraser not to refer to the matter (which was agitating the whole country) during the campaign. The government held the seat, and in a (non-broadcast) semi-secret session of the House on 2 August agreed to participate in a force against Japan "within the capacity of our remaining resources of manpower". And National's proposal to reduce the total armed forces to 55,000 was accepted.

== Previous election ==
1943 general election: Dunedin North
Party	Candidate	Votes	%	±%
Labour	Jim Munro	8,038	55.82	
National	Alexander Cassie	5,240	36.39	
People's Movement	Frederick Allan Keane	858	5.95	
Democratic Labour	Cornelius Machin Ross	263	1.82	
Informal votes		123	0.85	
Majority		2,798	19.43	
Turnout		14,399	91.76	
Registered electors		15,691		

== Results ==
The following table gives the election results:

1945 Dunedin North by-election
Party	Candidate	Votes	%	±%
Labour	Robert Walls	6,791	52.54	
National	Norman Jones	6,087	47.09	
Informal votes		46	0.35	−0.50
Majority		704	5.44	
Turnout		12,924	79.77	−11.99
Registered electors		16,200		

== See also ==
- List of New Zealand by-elections
- 1922 Dunedin North by-election
- 1953 North Dunedin by-election
