= 1953 North Dunedin by-election =

New Zealand by-election

← 1951 general	12 December 1953	1954 general →
- Turnout: 10,368 (70.42%)
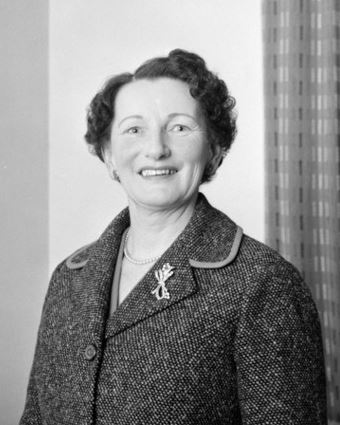

Candidate	Ethel McMillan	Walter MacDougall
Party	Labour	National
Popular vote	6,424	3,944
Percentage	61.96	38.04
Member before election
Robert Walls
Labour
Elected Member
Ethel McMillan
Labour

The 1953 North Dunedin by-election was a by-election held during the 30th New Zealand Parliament in the Dunedin electorate of North Dunedin. The by-election occurred following the death of MP Robert Walls and was won by Ethel McMillan.

== Background ==
Robert Walls, who was first elected to represent Dunedin North (the electorate's previous and subsequent name) for the Labour Party in the 1945 by-election, died on 6 November 1953. This triggered the North Dunedin by-election, which was held on 12 December 1953.

== Candidates ==
Labour
There were six nominations for the Labour Party nomination:

- Hubert Brown, a member of the Dunedin City Council who was Labour's mayoral candidate in 1950
- Russell Calvert, an organiser for the Dunedin Combined Ratepayers' Association
- Michael Connelly, a member of the Dunedin City Council and former Legislative Councillor
- Ethel McMillan, a member of the Dunedin City Council and Otago Hospital Board
- David Munro, Labour candidate for Wallace in 1946 and son of former MP Jim Munro
- Jack Stead, a member of the Dunedin City Council and Secretary of the Otago Labour Representation Committee

The Deputy Mayor of Dunedin and former Minister of Defence, Fred Jones, was also speculated as a candidate, but it was thought more likely he would seek nomination for the St Kilda electorate at the scheduled general election. Connelly, McMillan and Stead were seen as the frontrunners to win nomination. McMillan was chosen as the candidate.

National
Walter Phillips MacDougall was selected as the candidate for the National Party. He was National's candidate for Dunedin Central in 1951.

== Previous election ==
1951 general election: North Dunedin
Party	Candidate	Votes	%	±%
Labour	Robert Walls	6,929	51.13	−0.89
National	Donald Cameron	6,622	48.86	
Majority		307	2.26	−2.57
Turnout		13,551	92.03	−3.04
Registered electors		14,724		

== Results ==
The following table gives the election results:

1953 North Dunedin by-election
Party	Candidate	Votes	%	±%
Labour	Ethel McMillan	6,424	61.96	
National	Walter MacDougall	3,944	38.04	
Majority		2,480	23.92	
Turnout		10,368	70.41	−21.62
Registered electors		14,724		

McMillan obtained 61.96% of the votes and was successful. McMillan became the first woman to represent Dunedin North and would represent the electorate until the 1975 election, when she was defeated against Richard Walls of the National Party.

== See also ==
- List of New Zealand by-elections
- 1922 Dunedin North by-election
- 1945 Dunedin North by-election
