= Andrew Walker (politician) =

New Zealand politician (1855–1934)

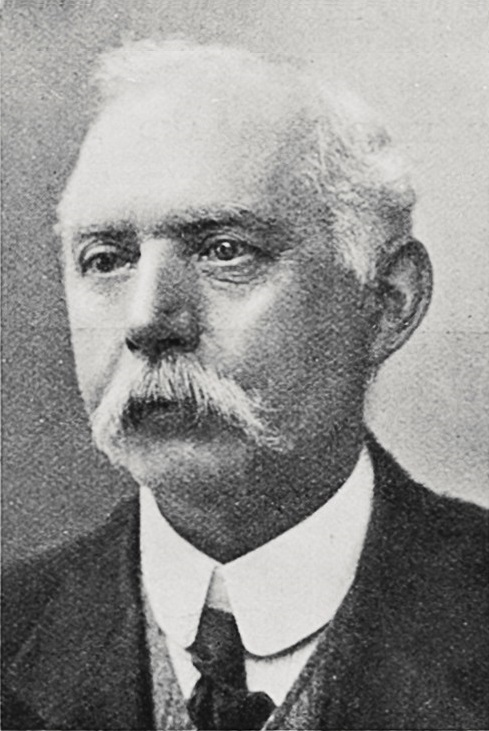

2nd President of the Labour Party
- In office 9 July 1917 – 11 July 1918
- Vice President: Michael Joseph Savage
- Leader: Alfred Hindmarsh
- Preceded by: James McCombs
- Succeeded by: Tom Paul

Member of the New Zealand Parliament for Dunedin North
- In office 10 December 1914 – 17 December 1919
- Preceded by: George M. Thomson
- Succeeded by: Edward Kellett

Personal details
- Born: 1855 North Berwick, Scotland
- Died: 10 July 1934 (aged 78–79) Lower Hutt, New Zealand
- Party: United Labour Party (1912–1916); Labour (1916–1934)

Andrew Walker (1855 – 10 July 1934) was a New Zealand politician of the United Labour Party and then the Labour Party from Dunedin.

== Early life ==
Walker was born in North Berwick, Scotland, in 1855. He came to New Zealand in 1860. He attended school in Dunedin's Union Street, where Robert Stout was one of his teachers. He left school aged 14 to learn the trade of printing at the Evening Star. He became a prominent union leader. Walker made a name for himself serving as the secretary of the Otago Typographical Union where he acted as a mentor to younger members such as Ken Baxter, leaving them with lasting commitments to the labour movement. He was also a Baptist dean and treasurer of Hanover Street Baptist Church.

== Political career ==
New Zealand Parliament
Years	Term	Electorate	Party
1914–1916	19th	Dunedin North	United Labour
1916–1919	Changed allegiance to:		Labour

He represented the Dunedin North electorate in Parliament from 1914 to 1919, when he was defeated by an Independent Labour candidate Edward Kellett. Walker was a protégé of Labour movement organiser Tom Paul, who did not contest a seat himself in the election, as he sat on the Legislative council, but must have felt vindicated after Walker's success.

In 1914 he won election, with Alfred Hindmarsh and Bill Veitch as the remnant of the United Labour Party, and in 1916 the remnant and the Social Democratic Party combined to form the Labour Party (NZLP).

Walker drew up the 1916 constitution and was the first secretary of the Labour Party caucus. He was the President of the NZLP but resigned in 1917 over the State Control issue, as he was a staunch prohibitionist. Between 1916 and 1919 he served as the Labour Party's whip. At the 1919 election, Walker was opposed by an "Independent" Labour candidate, Edward Kellett, for Dunedin North in a straight contest and Walker was defeated.

== Later life ==
Walker retired to Wellington where some of his family lived. For some years, he lived in Fairview Crescent in Kelburn. For his last two years, he lived at 13 Melling Road in Lower Hutt with his daughter and son-in-law. He died at the Lower Hutt residence on 10 July 1934. and was buried at Taita Cemetery. He was survived by his wife and two daughters; another daughter had died in 1919.

== Notes ==
New Zealand Parliament
Preceded by George M. Thomson	Member of Parliament for Dunedin North; 1914–1919	Succeeded by Edward Kellett
Party political offices
Preceded by James McCombs	President of the Labour Party; 1917–1918	Succeeded by Tom Paul
Preceded by position created	Senior Whip of the Labour Party; 1916–1919	Succeeded by James McCombs
