= William Begg (mayor) =

New Zealand businessman and politician

William Begg JP
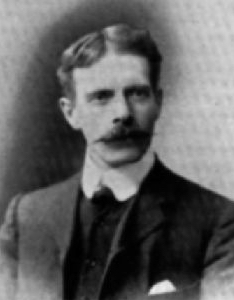

41st Mayor of Dunedin
- In office 1919–1921
- Preceded by: James Clark
- Succeeded by: James Douglas

Personal details
- Born: 31 May 1870; Edinburgh, Midlothian, Scotland
- Died: 7 January 1950 (aged 79); Dunedin, New Zealand
- Spouse: Jessie Isabel Given (m. 1923)
- Education: University of Otago
- Occupation: Businessman
- Profession: Fellmongery

William Begg JP (31 May 1870 – 7 January 1950) was a New Zealand businessman and politician. He served as mayor of Dunedin from 1919 to 1921.

== Biography ==
Born in Edinburgh, Scotland, on 31 May 1870, Begg was the son of Elizabeth Johnston Begg and John Begg. In 1879, the family migrated to New Zealand in 1879, settling in Dunedin. Begg studied at King Edward Technical College and later at the University of Otago, and trained in his father's sheepskin, mat and rug manufacturing firm, John Begg and Company.

As a young man, Begg played rugby union for the North East Valley and Union clubs, was captain and president of the Dunedin Cycling Club, and was a lieutenant in the North Dunedin Rifles. He later took up lawn bowls, and was a founding member and president of the North East Valley Bowling Club.

In 1902, Begg travelled to Britain and, after travelling for a time, took employment with a rug and mat manufacturing company near London. However, in November 1903, his father was killed in a boating accident at Pūrākaunui, and Begg was obliged to return to Dunedin to take over the running of the family company.

Begg entered public life in 1909, when he was elected as a member of the North East Valley Borough Council. The following year, after the amalgamation of the borough into the neighbouring Dunedin City, he became a city councillor, and remained on the council until being defeated at the 1938 local-body elections. Begg served a two-year term as mayor of Dunedin from 1919 to 1921, during which time he hosted the visit to the city of the Prince of Wales in 1920. Subsequently, Begg chaired the council's water committee for many years, and was closely associated with the development of the Deep Creek water supply scheme.

During his tenure as mayor, Begg was unmarried, and his mother acted as mayoress. However, on 14 November 1923, Begg married Jessie Isabel Given in Dunedin.

Begg served as a member of the Otago Harbour Board from 1929 until 1947, including three years at chairman. He also served on the Dunedin Fire Board, the Dunedin Drainage and Sewerage Board, and the Otago Hospital Board, and was a justice of the peace.

Begg died in Dunedin on 7 January 1950, and was buried in the Dunedin Northern Cemetery.

Political offices
Preceded by James Clark	Mayor of Dunedin; 1919–1921	Succeeded by James Douglas
