= Ethel McMillan =

New Zealand politician

Ethel McMillan QSO JP
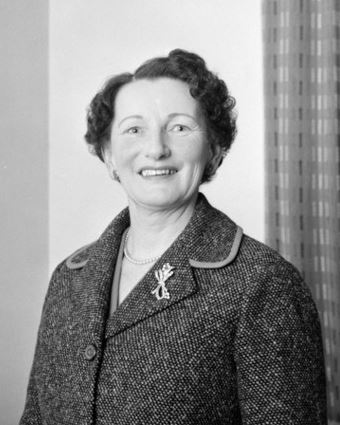
- McMillan in 1959

Member of the New Zealand Parliament for Dunedin North
- In office 12 December 1953 – 29 November 1975
- Preceded by: Robert Walls
- Succeeded by: Richard Walls

Dunedin City Councillor
- In office 18 November 1950 – 11 October 1980

Personal details
- Born: Ethel Emma Black; 12 May 1904 Kaiti, Gisborne, New Zealand
- Died: 13 August 1987 (aged 83) Dunedin, New Zealand
- Party: Labour
- Spouse: Gervan McMillan
- Education: Gisborne Girls' High School
- Alma mater: University of Otago
- Occupation: Politician

Ethel Emma McMillan QSO JP (née Black, 12 May 1904 – 13 August 1987) was a New Zealand politician of the Labour Party. She was a Member of Parliament for Dunedin electorates for 22 years, but despite her political seniority, was not appointed a cabinet minister. She was very active in local affairs in Otago and was the first woman to be elected to Dunedin City Council.

== Biography ==
=== Early life ===
McMillan was born at Kaiti, Gisborne, in 1904. She was dux and prefect at Gisborne Girls' High School. She graduated with honours in history from the University of Otago in 1926. She lectured in history at Otago for a year, during which time she met the medical student and her future husband, Gervan McMillan. She then taught at Nelson College for Girls for three years.

After their wedding on 4 September 1929 at Gisborne, they settled in Kurow, where he had worked as a locum and then purchased the medical practice. They moved to Dunedin in 1934, where her husband was elected to Parliament for the Labour Party in the Dunedin West electorate in 1935. He was cabinet minister for a year, but retired from Parliament in 1943 to concentrate on his medical practice. Gervan McMillan died from a heart disease in 1951, aged 46.

During their time in Kurow, the McMillans had friendships and political discussions with their neighbours, Arnold Nordmeyer and Jerry Skinner; both would become influential MPs for the Labour Party. They also hosted Michael Joseph Savage, who in 1935 would become Prime Minister. Her husband had been involved with the Labour Party since 1923, and Ethel McMillan joined the party in about 1930.

=== Local politics ===
McMillan had a distinguished local career in Dunedin. She was the first woman to be elected onto Dunedin City Council in 1950 (the second woman was elected in 1970) and remained a councillor until 1980. In 1960, she became the first New Zealand woman to be appointed a trustee to a savings bank. She chaired the local savings bank's board from 1964. She had governance roles with the Dunedin Public Art Gallery Society, the Otago Museum Trust, and the New Zealand Library Association.

In 1953, McMillan was awarded the Queen Elizabeth II Coronation Medal.

=== Parliamentary career ===
New Zealand Parliament
Years	Term	Electorate	Party
1953–1954	30th	North Dunedin	Labour
1954–1957	31st	North Dunedin	Labour
1957–1960	32nd	North Dunedin	Labour
1960–1963	33rd	North Dunedin	Labour
1963–1966	34th	Dunedin North	Labour
1966–1969	35th	Dunedin North	Labour
1969–1972	36th	Dunedin North	Labour
1972–1975	37th	Dunedin North	Labour

McMillan stood in a 1953 by-election in the North Dunedin electorate that was caused by the death of Labour's Robert Walls and was elected. She continued to represent the electorate to 1963, and then Dunedin North from 1963 to 1975, when she retired. Although she was a senior parliamentarian when Labour came to power in 1972, she was not elected to cabinet, possibly due to her strained relation with Norman Kirk. However, she did serve as Labour's Spokesperson for Health in Kirk's Shadow Cabinet. She was known as the 'Queen of Quiz' in Parliament for the numerous questions that she asked.

=== Later life ===
She was appointed a Companion of the Queen's Service Order for public services in the 1976 New Year Honours, and many felt that she should have received more official recognition. She died in Dunedin on 13 August 1987.

Three short streets close to the University of Otago campus were renamed in 1993 (New Zealand women's suffrage centenary year) to honour McMillan, Emily Siedeberg, and Ethel Benjamin.

== Notes ==
New Zealand Parliament
Preceded by Robert Walls	Member of Parliament for Dunedin North; 1953–1975	Succeeded by Richard Walls
