= Robert Walls (politician) =

New Zealand politician (1884–1953)

Robert Walls JP
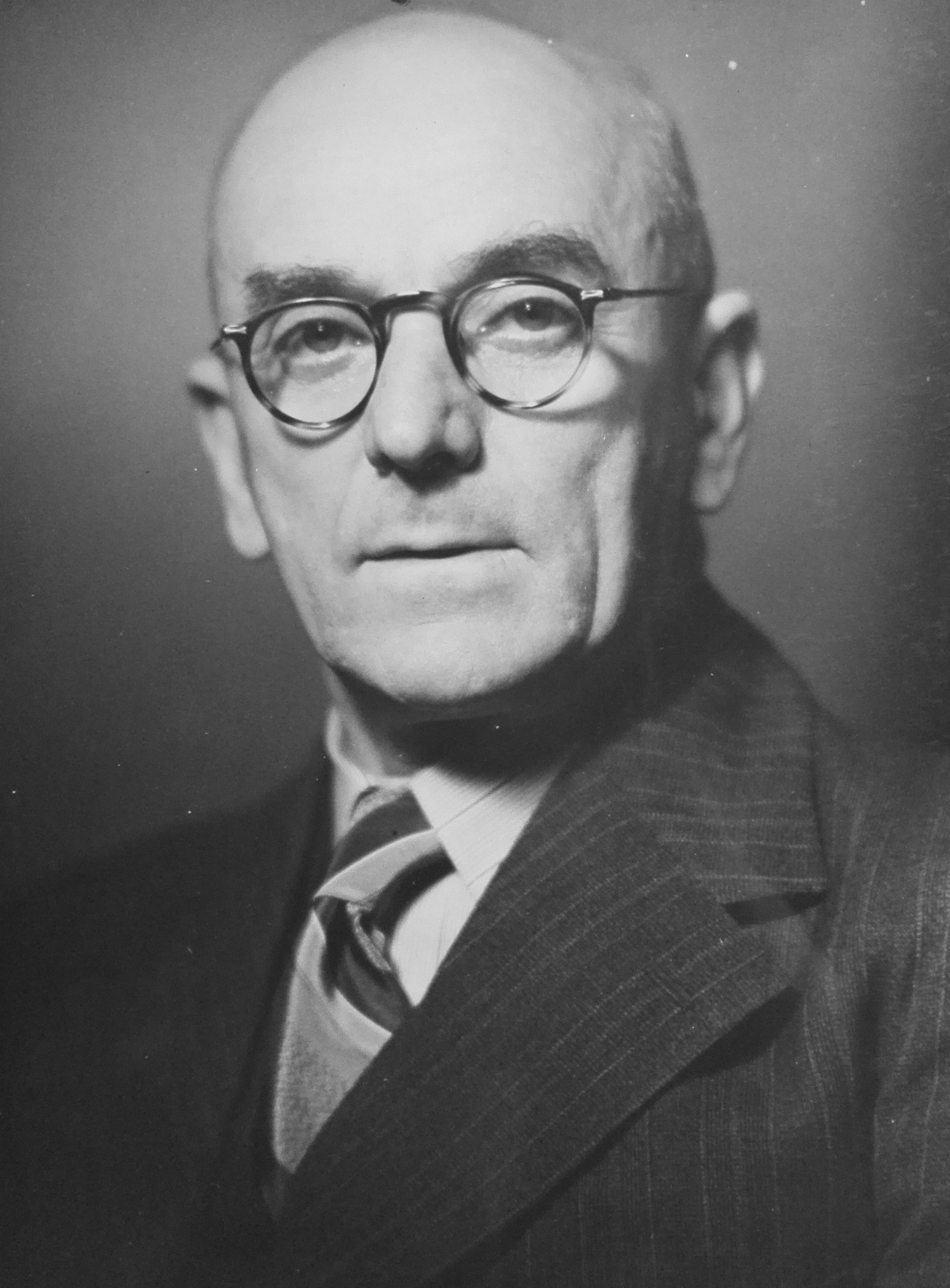

Member of the New Zealand Parliament for Dunedin North
- In office 21 July 1945 – 6 November 1953
- Preceded by: Jim Munro
- Succeeded by: Ethel McMillan

Personal details
- Born: 18 September 1884 Dunedin, New Zealand
- Died: 6 November 1953 (aged 69) Dunedin, New Zealand
- Party: Labour
- Relatives: Richard Walls (grandson)
- Profession: Cabinetmaker

Robert Walls JP (18 September 1884 – 6 November 1953) was a New Zealand businessman and politician of the Labour Party.

== Biography ==
=== Early life and career ===
Walls was born and educated in Dunedin in 1884. He was educated locally at High Street and Union Street Schools before proceeding to serve a carpentry apprenticeship. He then entered trade as a cabinetmaker, after which in partnership with John McCracken, purchased ownership of Laidlaw and Sons, a piano repairing and tuning business, renaming the business as McCracken and Walls, Ltd. The business evolved to be an electronics retailer and was at the forefront of modern communication technology in the 1920s and 1930s.

He was for a time the owner and proprietor of the private Dunedin radio station 4ZM, which was taken over by the government and closed down in the late 1930s. It was from 4ZM that Methodist minister Leslie Neale broadcast his famous Radio Church of the Helping Hand. The message was heard by tens of thousands of working-class Dunedinites who were living in poverty during the Great Depression. Neale preached the Christian Socialist "message of the Carpenter" with the backing of Walls (himself a former carpenter).

He was a Freemason and was Master of the Dunedin Lodge from 1917 to 1918. He was subsequently appointed Deputy District Grand Master of Otago and Southland.

He was a trustee of the Dunedin Savings Bank and served as its president in 1944 and concurrently to that was chairman of the National Savings Committee. He was also vice-president of the Otago High School Boys' Cricket Club, a member of the Otago Land Sales Committee and the Dunedin District Health Camp Committee and was also for many years a member of the Dunedin Orphans' Club. He was also a justice of the peace.

=== Political career ===
New Zealand Parliament
Years	Term	Electorate	Party
1945–1946	27th	Dunedin North	Labour
1946–1949	28th	North Dunedin	Labour
1949–1951	29th	North Dunedin	Labour
1951–1953	30th	North Dunedin	Labour

He served from 1938 as a Dunedin City Councillor and member of both the Otago Hospital Board and Otago Harbour Board. Walls was chairman of the council's Water Committee for many years. At the 1944 elections he "topped the poll" for both the City Council and the Harbour Board, and was consequently offered the role of deputy mayor, but declined in accordance with Labour Party policy, which forbade his acceptance of the office. He had previously stood for local office unsuccessfully.

He represented the Dunedin electorates of Dunedin North from a 1945 by-election to 1946, and then North Dunedin from 1946 to 1953 when he died. Among both colleagues and constituents he was well regarded for his abilities, courtesy and kindness.

In 1953, Walls was awarded the Queen Elizabeth II Coronation Medal.

=== Death and legacy ===
Walls died in Dunedin on 6 November 1953, aged 69. He had been in bad health for some time. His grandson Richard was also MP for Dunedin North, from 1975 to 1978 (as a National Party member) and was later mayor of Dunedin from 1989 to 1995.

New Zealand Parliament
Preceded by Jim Munro	Member of Parliament for Dunedin North / North Dunedin; 1945–1953	Succeeded by Ethel McMillan
