= 1919 New Zealand general election =

Election in New Zealand

1919 general election
- 16 (Māori) & 17 December (general) 1919

All 80 seats in the New Zealand House of Representatives 41 seats were needed for a majority
- Turnout: 80.5%
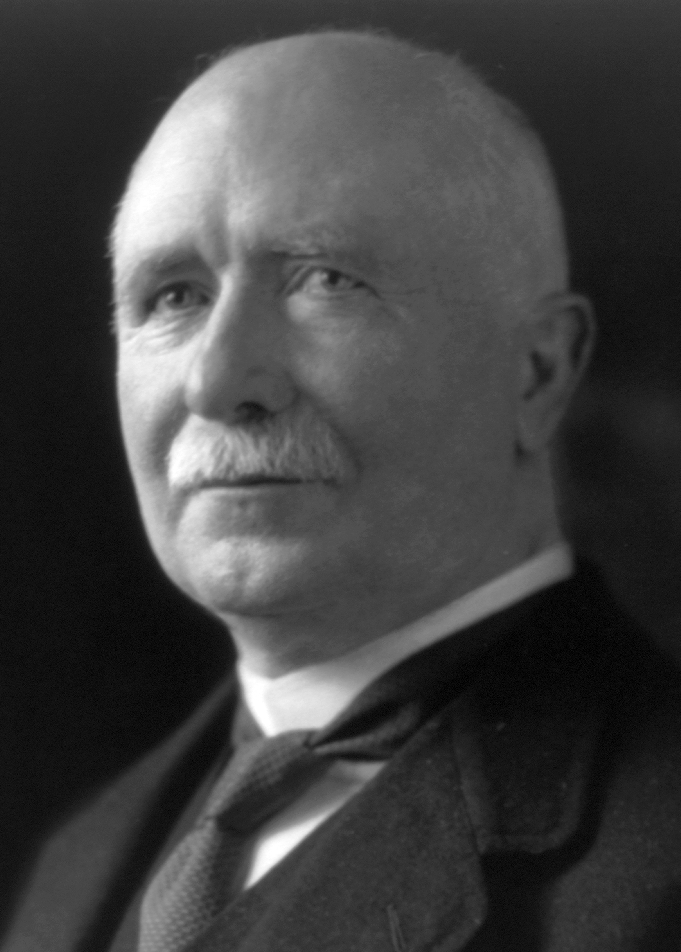

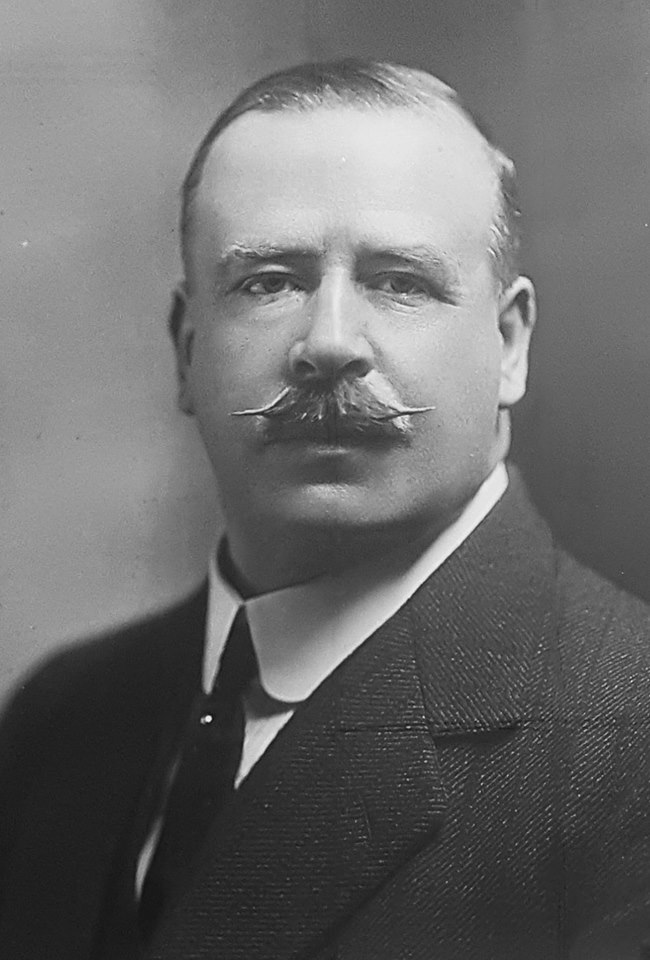

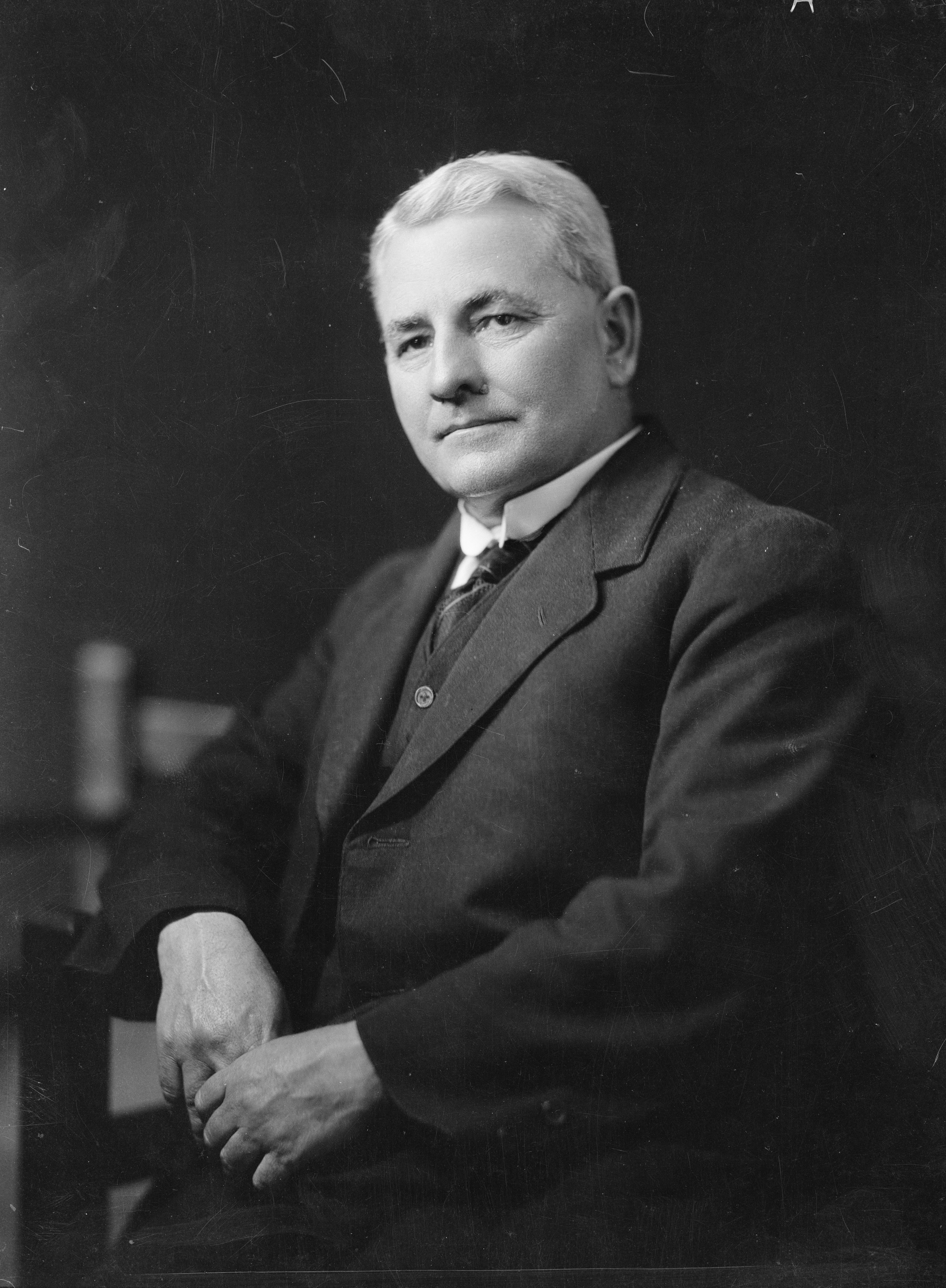
	First party	Second party	Third party
Leader	William Massey	Joseph Ward	Harry Holland
Party	Reform	Liberal	Labour
Leader since	11 February 1909	11 September 1913	27 August 1919
Leader's seat	Franklin	Awarua (lost seat)	Grey
Last election	40 seats, 47.1%	34 seats, 43.1%	5 seats, 8.4% (Note: Results for the United Labour Party (3 seats, 4.2%) and Social Democratic Party (2 seats, 4.2%).)
Seats before	39	34	5
Seats won	45	19	8
Seat change	▲6	▼15	▲3
Popular vote	193,676	155,708	131,402
Percentage	35.7%	28.7%	24.2%
Swing	▼11.4%	▼14.4%	▲15.8%
- Results of the election.
Prime Minister before election
William Massey
Reform
Subsequent Prime Minister
William Massey
Reform

The 1919 New Zealand general election was held on Tuesday, 16 December in the Māori electorates and on Wednesday, 17 December in the general electorates to elect a total of 80 MPs to the 20th session of the New Zealand Parliament. A total number of 560,673 (80.5%) voters turned out to vote.

In 1919 women won the right to be elected to the House of Representatives. The law was changed late that year, and with only three weeks' notice, three women stood for Parliament.

They were Ellen Melville in Grey Lynn, Rosetta Baume in Parnell, and Aileen Cooke in Thames. Ellen Melville stood for the Reform Party and came second. She stood for Parliament several more times and generally polled well but never won a seat.

This is the most recent general election in which none of the major party leaders were born in New Zealand.

== Results ==
Though Labour Party captured only eight seats it received nearly a quarter of the votes – a shock to conservative minds due to Labour being founded only three years earlier in 1916.

=== Party totals ===
Election results
Party	Candidates	Total votes	Percentage	Seats won
Reform Party	67	197,041	35.63	45
Liberal Party (Note: Includes one MP returned unopposed, and one Independent Liberal)	66	166,675	30.14	19
Labour Party	59	134,094	24.25	8
Independents (Note: Includes ex-members of the three main parties as well as long-standing Independents)	39	55,161	9.98	8
Total valid votes		552,971		80
Informal votes		7,702	1.37	
Registered voters		683,420		

=== Votes summary ===
Popular Vote
Reform	35.63%
Liberal	30.14%
Labour	24.25%
Independents	9.98%

Parliament seats
Reform	56.25%
Liberal	23.75%
Labour	10.00%
Independents	10.00%

=== Electorate results ===
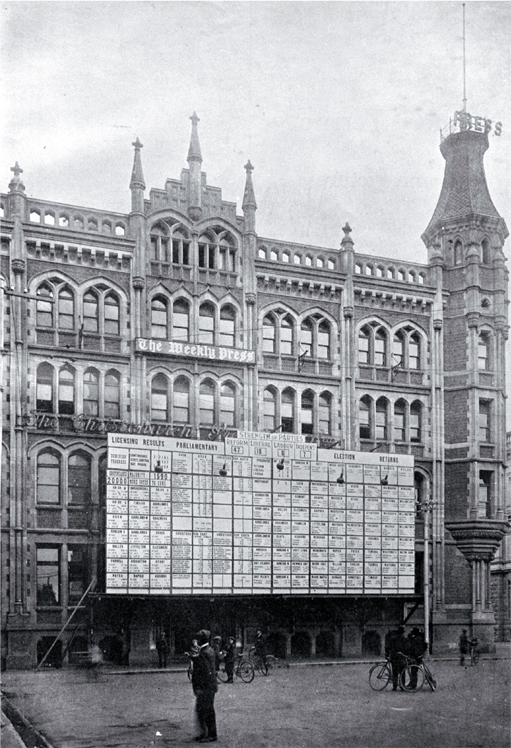
The results of the 1919 general election displayed outside The Press Building in Christchurch

The table below shows the results of the 1919 general election:

Key

Reform	Liberal	Labour	Liberal–Labour
Independent Liberal		Independent Labour	Independent

Electorate results for the 1919 New Zealand general election
Electorate	Incumbent	Winner	Majority	Runner up
General electorates
Ashburton	William Nosworthy		1,493	William Dickie
Auckland Central	Albert Glover	Bill Parry	786	Albert Glover
Auckland East	Arthur Myers		158	Clutha Mackenzie
Auckland West	Charles Poole	Michael Joseph Savage	533	Charles Frederick Bennett
Avon	George Russell	Dan Sullivan	1,648	George Russell
Awarua	Sir Joseph Ward	John Hamilton	757	Sir Joseph Ward
Bay of Islands	Vernon Reed		1,195	St. Claire Jounneaux
Bay of Plenty	William MacDonald		1,234	Kenneth Williams
Bruce	James Allen		126	John Edie
Buller	James Colvin	Harry Holland	1,003	Denis Quinlan O'Brien
Chalmers	James Dickson		883	John Gilchrist
Christchurch East	Henry Thacker		1,940	Hiram Hunter
Christchurch North	Leonard Isitt		2,403	Tim Armstrong
Christchurch South	Harry Ell	Ted Howard	1,675	Henry Holland
Clutha	Alexander Malcolm		134	Robert Alexander Rodger
Dunedin Central	Charles Statham		497	Jim Munro
Dunedin North	Andrew Walker	Edward Kellett	806	Andrew Walker
Dunedin South	Thomas Sidey		84	Tom Paul
Dunedin West	William Downie Stewart		2,421	John Arthur Brown
Eden	James Parr		1,854	Oscar McBrine
Egmont	Charles Wilkinson	Oswald Hawken	191	David Lyon Abbott Astbury
Ellesmere	Heaton Rhodes		749	George Barclay
Franklin	William Massey		3,030	Joseph Rea
Gisborne	James Carroll	Douglas Lysnar	373	James Carroll
Grey Lynn	John Payne	Fred Bartram	481	Ellen Melville
Hawke's Bay	John Findlay	Hugh Campbell	942	Gilbert McKay
Hurunui	George Forbes		667	John George Armstrong
Hutt	Thomas Wilford		1,005	David Pritchard
Invercargill	Josiah Hanan		1,403	John Archer
Kaiapoi	David Buddo	David Jones	50	David Buddo
Kaipara	Gordon Coates		3,291	Alfred Gregory
Lyttelton	James McCombs		577	Robert Macartney
Manawatu	New electorate	Edward Newman	866	Alfred Hillier
Manukau	Frederic Lang		2,508	Rex Mason
Marsden	Francis Mander		189	Alfred Murdoch
Masterton	George Sykes	George Sykes	344	Archibald Holms
Mataura	George Anderson		1,336	David McDougall
Motueka	Richard Hudson		661	Percy Power
Napier	Vigor Brown		54	Frederick Charles Evans
Nelson	Thomas Field	Harry Atmore	510	Thomas Field
Oamaru	Ernest Lee		276	Jack MacPherson
Ohinemuri	Hugh Poland		555	Joseph Clark
Oroua	David Guthrie		1,843	Ernest Tunnicliffe
Otaki	William Hughes Field		1,232	James McKenzie
Pahiatua	Harold Smith	Archibald McNicol	170	Robert Ross
Palmerston	Jimmy Nash		1,004	Moses Ayrton
Parnell	James Samuel Dickson		3,419	Tom Bloodworth
Patea	George Pearce	Walter Powdrell	255	William Morrison
Raglan	Richard Bollard		988	Bill Jordan
Rangitikei	Edward Newman	Billy Glenn	635	Francis Patrick Brady
Riccarton	George Witty		626	William Russell Devereux
Roskill	New electorate	Vivian Potter	1,854	James Gunson
Rotorua	New electorate	Frank Hockly	1,733	Malcolm Larney
Stratford	John Hine	Robert Masters	61	John Hine
Taranaki	Sydney George Smith	Sydney George Smith	1,023	George H. Buckeridge
Tauranga	William Herries		1,860	Benjamin Robbins
Temuka	Charles Talbot	Thomas Burnett	31	Charles Talbot
Thames	Thomas William Rhodes		1,590	William John McCormick
Timaru	James Craigie	James Craigie	1,519	Percy Vinnell
Waikato	Alexander Young		2,893	Percy Watts
Waimarino	Robbie Smith		643	Frank Langstone
Waipawa	George Hunter		274	Albert Jull
Wairarapa	J. T. Marryat Hornsby	Alex McLeod	540	J. T. Marryat Hornsby
Wairau	Richard McCallum		796	Bernard James Cooke
Waitaki	John Anstey	John Bitchener	472	John Anstey
Waitemata	Alexander Harris		1,419	Arthur Edwin Greenslade
Waitomo	New electorate	Bill Jennings	377	Charles Wilson
Wakatipu	William Fraser	James Horn	801	Robert Scott
Wallace	John Charles Thomson	Adam Hamilton	43	John Charles Thomson
Wanganui	Bill Veitch		1,703	William J. Cuttle
Wellington Central	Peter Fraser		1,056	Frederick Pirani
Wellington East	Alfred Newman		1,058	Alec Monteith
Wellington North	John Luke		1,065	H. Oakley Browne
Wellington South	Bob Semple	George Mitchell	1,426	Bob Semple
Wellington Suburbs	Robert Wright		1,127	Alexander Croskery
Westland	Tom Seddon		1,497	James O'Brien
Māori electorates
Eastern Maori	Āpirana Ngata		Uncontested	
Northern Maori	Taurekareka Henare		1,629	Nau Parone Kawiti
Southern Maori	Hopere Uru		207	Riki te Mairaki Taiaroa
Western Maori	Māui Pōmare		1,424	Ngarangi Katitia

=== Summary of changes ===
A boundary redistribution resulted in the abolition of four electorates:

- Grey, held by Harry Holland
- Otago Central, held by Robert Scott
- Selwyn, held by William Dickie
- Taumarunui, held by Bill Jennings
- Wellington Suburbs and Country, held by Robert Wright

At the same time, four new electorates were created:

- Manawatu, previously abolished in 1911
- Roskill, first created through the 1918 electoral redistribution
- Rotorua, first created through the 1918 electoral redistribution
- Waitomo, first created through the 1918 electoral redistribution
- Wellington Suburbs, previously abolished in 1911
