= Jim Munro (politician) =

New Zealand politician (1870–1945)

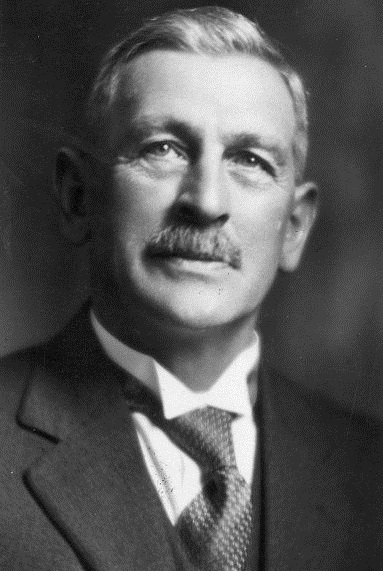

9th Deputy Mayor of Dunedin
- In office 7 December 1937 – 11 May 1938
- Mayor: Edwin Thoms Cox
- Preceded by: Fred Jones
- Succeeded by: Donald Cameron

Member of the New Zealand Parliament for Dunedin North
- In office 14 November 1928 – 27 May 1945
- Preceded by: Harold Tapley
- Succeeded by: Robert Walls
- In office 21 June 1922 – 4 November 1925
- Preceded by: Edward Kellett
- Succeeded by: Harold Tapley

Personal details
- Born: James Wright Munro; 22 February 1870 Dunedin, New Zealand
- Died: 27 May 1945 (aged 75) Dunedin, New Zealand
- Party: Labour

James Wright Munro (22 February 1870 – 27 May 1945) was a New Zealand politician of the Labour Party.

== Early life ==
Munro was born in Dunedin in 1870. He was a baker by trade, and president of the Dunedin Bakers' Union in 1907. He started his own business in partnership with Peter Neilson (who also became a Labour MP) after victimisation by employers. Munro was president of the Dunedin branch of the Independent Political Labour League (IPLL) in 1907. In 1911, he was national president of the New Zealand Socialist Party.

== Political career ==
New Zealand Parliament
Years	Term	Electorate	Party
1922	20th	Dunedin North	Labour
1922–1925	21st	Dunedin North	Labour
1928–1931	23rd	Dunedin North	Labour
1931–1935	24th	Dunedin North	Labour
1935–1938	25th	Dunedin North	Labour
1938–1943	26th	Dunedin North	Labour
1943–1945	27th	Dunedin North	Labour

He first stood for Parliament when he contested the Dunedin West electorate in the 1908 election for the IPLL. On this occasion, he was beaten by John A. Millar of the Liberal Party. He contested the same electorate in the 1911 election for the Socialist Party as one of three candidates and was eliminated in the first ballot.

He unsuccessfully contested the 1914 election in the Dunedin Central electorate for the United Labour Party against Charles Statham of the Reform Party. Statham resigned after the election after irregularities in the counting of the vote turned a 12-vote lead for Munro into a 12-vote loss. Munro and Statham contested the resulting 1915 by-election, which was narrowly won by Statham.

Munro and Statham contested the Dunedin Central electorate again in the 1919 election, Munro standing for the Labour Party, and Statham as an independent. The incumbent was successful.

Munro represented the electorate of Dunedin North in Parliament from the 1922 by-election to 1925, and from 1928 to 1945, when he died.

In 1935, he was awarded the King George V Silver Jubilee Medal.

He was not appointed a minister in 1935 as he had a reputation for being lazy, and had embarrassed Savage a week before the 1935 election by stating that:

"if anyone tried to stop a Labour government carrying out its policy, Labour might have to ‘smash things’ and put directors and managers in gaol on a bread and water diet ‘as some of our Communist friends were dealt with’ until they learnt to obey the government".

He was on the Dunedin City Council (1927–1945) and Otago Harbour Board. From 1937 until 1938 he was Deputy Mayor of Dunedin. He died in Dunedin on 27 May 1945, and his ashes were buried at Andersons Bay Cemetery.

His son, David Johnston Munro, was Labour's parliamentary candidate for the Wallace electorate at the 1946 election. He lost to National MP Tom Macdonald. He later sought the Labour nomination at the 1953 North Dunedin by-election but was not selected.

== Notes ==
New Zealand Parliament
Preceded by Edward Kellett	Member of Parliament for Dunedin North; 1922 – 1925 1928 – 1945	Succeeded by Harold Tapley
Preceded by Harold Tapley	Member of Parliament for Dunedin North; 1922 – 1925 1928 – 1945	Succeeded by Robert Walls
Political offices
Preceded by Fred Jones	Deputy Mayor of Dunedin; 1937–1938	Succeeded by Donald Cameron
