= Edward Kellett (New Zealand politician) =

New Zealand politician (1864–1922)

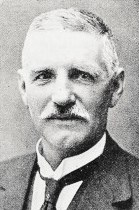

Member of the New Zealand Parliament for Dunedin North
- In office 17 December 1919 – 15 May 1922
- Preceded by: Andrew Walker
- Succeeded by: Jim Munro

Personal details
- Born: 7 November 1864 Dunedin, New Zealand
- Died: 15 May 1922 (aged 57) New Zealand
- Party: United Labour Party (1912–1916)

Edward Kellett (7 November 1864 – 15 May 1922) was a New Zealand Independent Labour Member of Parliament for a Dunedin electorate.

== Biography ==
New Zealand Parliament
Years	Term	Electorate	Party
1919–1922	20th	Dunedin North	Independent Labour

Kellett was born in Dunedin and served on the West Harbour Borough Council until 1919. He served on the Dunedin City Council from 1917 to 1919. During the First World War Kellett supported conscription and resigned from the Labour Party in 1916. He was an executive member of the Welfare League organised by former Labour Leader David McLaren.

At the 1919 election, Kellett stood as an independent Labour candidate in the Dunedin North electorate and defeated sitting Labour MP, Andrew Walker, in a straight contest. Kellett represented the electorate until his death on 15 May 1922.

Twelve months prior to his death, Kellett formed a parliamentary alliance with another Dunedin Independent MP, Charles Statham, the so-called "New Party", which was moving towards fusion with the Liberals when Kellett died several months before the general election in 1922.

Kellett was ill for several months. He underwent a serious operation and six weeks after that, he died.

== Notes ==
New Zealand Parliament
Preceded by Andrew Walker	Member of Parliament for Dunedin North; 1919–1922	Succeeded by Jim Munro
