= List of New Zealand politicians =

The following is a list of New Zealand politicians, both past and present. The scope is quite broad, including prominent candidates for local and central government office as well as those who achieved such office.

== A ==
- Adams, Amy – Cabinet minister
- Ahipene-Mercer, Ray – local politician
- Algie, Sir Ronald – Speaker of the House (1961–1966)
- Allen, Alfred – Speaker of the House (1972)
- Allen, Lettie – local politician
- Allen, Sir James – Cabinet minister (1911–1920)
- Ambler, Fred – local politician
- Amos, Phil – Cabinet minister
- Andersen, Ginny – Member of Parliament
- Anderton, Bill – Cabinet minister
- Anderton, Jim – deputy prime minister (1999–2002)
- Appleton, Sir William – Mayor of Wellington
- Archer, John – Mayor of Christchurch
- Ardern, Jacinda – prime minister (2017–2023)
- Arthur, Sir Basil – Speaker of the House (1984–1985)
- Armishaw, Eric – local politician
- Atkinson, Arthur (Jr.)
- Atkinson, Harry – premier of New Zealand (1876–1877)
- Atmore, Harry – Cabinet minister (1928–1931)
- Auchinvole, Chris – Member of Parliament (2008–2014)
- Awatere Huata, Donna – Member of Parliament (1996–2004)
- Ayrton, Moses – local politician

== B ==
- Bacot, John
- Baldock, Larry
- Ballance, John – prime minister
- Banks, John – Mayor of Auckland
- Barber, William Henry Peter – Member of Parliament
- Barker, Rick – Cabinet minister
- Barnard, Bill – Speaker (1936–1943)
- Bartram, Fred – Member of Parliament
- Bassett, Michael – Cabinet minister
- Basten, Alice – local politician
- Bateman, Jim – local politician
- Batten, Ann – Member of Parliament
- Baume, Frederick – Member of Parliament
- Bedford, Harry – Member of Parliament
- Beetham, Bruce – Member of Parliament
- Belich, Sir James – Mayor of Wellington
- Benson-Pope, David – Cabinet minister
- Bell, Dillon – Member of Parliament
- Bell, Francis – prime minister
- Beyer, Georgina – Member of Parliament
- Birch, Bill – Cabinet minister
- Black, George – Member of Parliament
- Blincoe, John – Member of Parliament
- Bloodworth, Thomas – local politician
- Bolger, Jim – prime minister (1990–1997)
- Bond, Ria – Member of Parliament
- Blumsky, Mark – Mayor of Wellington
- Bracken, Thomas
- Bradford, Sue – Member of Parliament
- Brash, Don – Leader of the Opposition
- Brash, Jenny – Mayor of Porirua
- Brindle, Tom – local politician
- Brown, Peter – Member of Parliament
- Brown, Vigor – Mayor of Napier
- Brownlee, Gerry – Cabinet minister
- Brunt, Tony – local politician
- Buck, Vicki – Mayor of Christchurch
- Buckley, Patrick
- Burke, John – Mayor of Porirua
- Burke, Kerry – Speaker of the House
- Burton, Mark – Cabinet minister
- Butler, Peter – local politician
- Buttle, Keith – Mayor of Auckland

== C ==
- Carleton, Hugh – MP (1853–1870)
- Robert Holt Carpenter (1820–1891), local politician
- Carr, Clyde – Member of Parliament
- Carr, Peter – Member of Parliament
- Carroll, Sir James – Member of Parliament (1887–1919)
- Carter, Chris – Cabinet minister (2002–2007)
- Casey, Cathy
- Caygill, David – Cabinet minister (1984–1990)
- Chapman, Charles Henry – Member of Parliament
- Chapman, Val – local politician
- Choudhary, Dr. Ashraf – Member of Parliament (2002–2011)
- Churchill, John – local politician
- Clark, David – Cabinet minister
- Clark, Helen – prime minister (1999–2008)
- Clifford, Sir Charles – Speaker of the House (1853–1860)
- Coates, Gordon – prime minister (1925–1928)
- Coffey, Tāmati – Member of Parliament
- Collins, Efeso – local politician
- Coleman, David – Member of Parliament
- Cooke, Frederick – local politician
- Cooper, Warren – Cabinet minister (1978–1984, 1990–1996)
- Copeland, Gordon – Member of Parliament (2002–2008)
- Croskery, Alexander – local politician
- Courtney, Mel – Member of Parliament (1976–1981)
- Cox, Edwin Thoms – Mayor of Dunedin
- Cracknell, Vernon – Member of Parliament
- Craig, Liz – Member of Parliament
- Creech, Wyatt – deputy prime minister (1998–1999), Cabinet minister (1990–1999)
- Cullen, Sir Michael – Cabinet minister (1999–2008)
- Cumberland, Ken – local politician
- Cunliffe, David – Cabinet minister (2002–2008)
- Curran, Clare – Cabinet minister
- Curran, Pat – local politician

== D ==
- Dalziel, Lianne – Mayor of Christchurch
- Davidson, Marama – Member of Parliament
- Davies, Sonja – Member of Parliament
- Davis, George – local politician
- Davis, Kelvin – Cabinet minister
- de Ruyter, Stephnie – local politician
- Delamere, Tuariki – Member of Parliament
- Dockrill, Edward – Mayor of New Plymouth
- Doidge, Frederick – Cabinet minister
- Domett, Alfred – prime minister
- Donald, Rod – Member of Parliament
- Douglas, Norman – Member of Parliament
- Douglas, Sir Roger Douglas – minister of finance
- Dowse, Percy – Mayor of Lower Hutt
- Dreaver, Mary – Member of Parliament
- Dunne, Peter – Cabinet minister
- Dwyer, Jeremy – Mayor of Hastings
- Dyson, Ruth – Cabinet minister

== E ==
- East, Paul – Cabinet minister
- Eagle, Paul – Member of Parliament
- Edwards, Clive – local politician
- English, Bill – prime minister (2016–2017)
- Entrican, Andrew – local politician
- Ewen-Street, Ian – Member of Parliament

== F ==
- Faafoi, Kris – Cabinet minister
- Fagan, Mark – Speaker of the Legislative Council
- Featherston, Isaac
- Fisher, Francis
- Fitzherbert, William
- Fitzsimons, Jeanette – Member of Parliament
- Fletcher, Robert – Member of Parliament
- Forsaith, Thomas
- Forsyth, Thomas – Member of Parliament
- Fortuin, Gregory
- Fortune, Wilfred – Member of Parliament
- Foster, Andy – local politician
- Fowlds, George – Cabinet minister
- Fowler, Sir Michael – Mayor of Wellington
- Fletcher, Christine – Mayor of Auckland
- Forbes, George – prime minister
- Fox, William – prime minister
- Fox, Marama – Member of Parliament
- Flavell, Te Ururoa – Cabinet minister
- Franks, Stephen – Member of Parliament
- Fraser, Francis Humphris
- Fraser, Peter – prime minister
- Fraser, Bill – Cabinet minister
- Fraser, Dame Dorothy – local politician
- Freer, Warren – Cabinet minister
- Furkert, Frederick – local politician

== G ==
- Gair, George – Cabinet minister
- Gaskin, Ida
- Genter, Julie Anne – Cabinet minister
- Gilmer, Dame Elizabeth – local politician
- Glasse, Fred – local politician
- Gledhill, Francis
- Glover, Albert – Member of Parliament
- Glover, John – local politician
- Goff, Phil – Mayor of Auckland
- Goodman, Dame Barbara – local politician
- Gordon, Liz – Member of Parliament
- Gosche, Mark – Cabinet minister
- Gotlieb, Ruth – local politician
- Graham, Doug – Cabinet minister
- Gray, John
- Gray, Robin – Speaker of the House
- Greenwood, Joseph
- Grey, Sir George – prime minister and twice governor
- Guinness, Arthur – Speaker of the House

== H ==
- Haerehuka – Tribal leader, warrior and orator
- Hall, Sir John – prime minister
- Hall-Jones, Sir William – prime minister
- Hamilton, Adam – Leader of the Opposition
- Hancock, Hamish – Member of Parliament
- Harawira, Hone – Leader of Mana Party
- Harré, Laila – Cabinet minister
- Harrison, Sir Richard
- Hart, Robert
- Harvey, Bob – Mayor of Waitakere
- Hawkins, George – Cabinet minister
- Henare, Peeni – Cabinet minister
- Henare, Tau – Cabinet minister
- Hickey, Pat
- Hide, Rodney – Cabinet minister
- Highet, Allan – Cabinet minister
- Hill, Edward – Mayor of New Plymouth
- Hill, Henry – Mayor of Napier
- Hipkins, Chris – Cabinet minister
- Hindmarsh, Alfred – Member of Parliament
- Hobbs, Marian – Cabinet minister
- Hodgson, Pete – Cabinet minister
- Holland, Harry – Leader of the Opposition
- Holland, Sir Sidney – prime minister
- Holyoake, Sir Keith – prime minister and Governor-General
- Horomia, Parekura – Cabinet minister
- Howard, Mabel – New Zealand's first female Cabinet minister
- Hudson, Wally – Member of Parliament
- Hunt, Jonathan – Speaker of the House
- Hunter, Edward
- Hunter, Hiram – local politician

== I ==
- Izard, Charles Hayward – Member of Parliament

== J ==
- Jack, Roy – Speaker of the House
- Jackson, Willie – Cabinet minister
- Jeffries, Bill – Cabinet minister
- Jeffries, John – local politician
- Jones, Bob
- Jones, Dail – Member of Parliament
- Jones, Fred – Cabinet minister
- Jones, Shane – Cabinet minister

== K ==
- Kaipara, Oriini – Member of Parliament
- Kanongata'a-Suisuiki, Anahila – Member of Parliament
- Kealy, John W. – local politician
- Kedgley, Sue – Member of Parliament
- Kelham, James
- Key, John – prime minister (2008–2016)
- Kidd, Doug – Cabinet minister
- King, Annette – Cabinet minister
- King, Thomas
- Kinsella, Arthur – QSO – Cabinet minister (1960–1969)
- Kirk, Norman – prime minister
- Kirton, Neil – Cabinet minister
- Kitts, Sir Frank – Mayor of Wellington
- Knapp, Gary – Member of Parliament
- Kopu, Alamein – Member of Parliament

== L ==
- Laidlaw, Chris – Member of Parliament
- Lake, Harry – Cabinet minister
- Lang, Frederic – Speaker of the House
- Lange, David – prime minister
- Langstone, Frank – Cabinet minister
- Larnach, William – Member of Parliament
- Laurenson, George – Cabinet minister
- Laws, Michael – Member of Parliament
- Leadbeater, Maire – local politician
- Lee, Graeme – Cabinet minister
- Lee, John A. – Member of Parliament
- Lee-Vercoe, Sandra – Cabinet minister
- Lee, Walter – Cabinet minister
- Lees-Galloway, Iain – Cabinet minister
- Leggett, Nick – Mayor of Porirua
- Lester, Justin – Mayor of Wellington
- Lewis, Richard
- Little, Andrew – Cabinet minister
- Locke, Keith – Member of Parliament
- Logie, Jan – Member of Parliament
- Love, Ralph – Mayor of Petone
- Lubeck, Marja – Member of Parliament
- Luxton, Jo – Member of Parliament
- Luxton, John – Cabinet minister

== M ==
- Macandrew, James – Cabinet minister
- Macdonald, Kennedy – Member of Parliament
- Macdonald, Tom – Cabinet minister
- Macfarlane, Sir Robert – Speaker of the House
- MacIntyre, Duncan – deputy prime minister
- Mackay, James
- Mackenzie, Thomas – prime minister
- Mackey, Janet – Member of Parliament
- Mackley, Garnet – Member of Parliament
- McAnulty, Kieran – Member of Parliament
- McCarten, Matt
- McCombs, Elizabeth – New Zealand's first female Member of Parliament
- McCombs, James – Member of Parliament
- McCombs, Sir Terry – Cabinet minister
- McCulloch, Alan
- McDavitt, Terry – local politician
- McDouall, Hamish – Mayor of Wanganui
- McGrath, Denis – local politician
- McKeen, Robert – Speaker of the House
- McKinnon, Don – deputy prime minister, Secretary General of the Commonwealth
- McKinnon, Ian – local politician
- McLay, Sir Jim – deputy prime minister
- McLaren, David – Mayor of Wellington
- McManus, John – local politician
- McMillan, Ethel – Member of Parliament
- McMillan, Gervan – Cabinet minister
- McQueen, Ewen
- McVicar, Annie – local politician
- Maguire, Emily – local politician
- Maharey, Steve – Cabinet minister
- Mallard, Trevor – Speaker of the House
- Mahuta, Nanaia – Cabinet minister
- Manning, George – Mayor of Christchurch
- Mark, Ron – Cabinet minister
- Marks, Roly – local politician
- Marshall, Jack – prime minister
- Marshall, Russell – Cabinet minister
- Martin, Bernard
- Martin, Tracey – Cabinet minister
- Massey, William – prime minister
- Matthews, Pressley Hemingway
- Matthewson, Clive – Cabinet minister
- Mason, Rex – longest-serving Member of Parliament
- Melville, Ellen – local politician
- Merriman, Frederick
- Meurant, Ross – Member of Parliament
- Mihaka, Dun
- Minogue, Mike – Member of Parliament
- Monro, David
- Monteith, Alex – Member of Parliament
- Moore, Frank
- Garry Moore – Mayor of Christchirch
- Moore, Mike – prime minister and Director-General of the World Trade Organization
- Moorhouse, William Sefton – Member of Parliament
- Morgan, Tuku – Member of Parliament
- Morris, Deborah – Member of Parliament
- Morrison, Gordon – local politician
- Morrison, John – local politician
- Morrison, Neil – Member of Parliament
- Moyle, Colin – Cabinet minister
- Muldoon, Sir Robert – prime minister (1975–1984)
- Munro, Jim – Member of Parliament

== N ==
- Nash, Stuart – Cabinet minister
- Nash, Sir Walter – prime minister (1957–1960)
- Neale, Edgar Rollo (Gar) – Member of Parliament (1946–1957)
- Neilson, Peter – Member of Parliament
- Neilson, Peter – Cabinet minister
- Newman, Alfred – Mayor of Wellington
- Newman, Muriel – Member of Parliament
- Ngata, Āpirana – Cabinet minister
- Noonan, Rosslyn – local politician
- Nordmeyer, Sir Arnold – minister of finance
- Northey, Richard – Member of Parliament
- Nosworthy, William – Cabinet minister

== O ==
- Oram, Matthew – Speaker of the House
- O'Brien, Gerald – Member of Parliament
- O'Brien, Loughlin
- O'Connor, Damien – Cabinet minister
- O'Connor, Greg – Member of Parliament
- O'Flynn, Frank – Cabinet minister
- O'Neill, James
- O'Rorke, Maurice – was O'Rorke, George – Speaker of the House
- O'Rourke, Denis – Member of Parliament
- Okeroa, Mahara – Member of Parliament

== P ==
- Palmer, Geoffrey – prime minister
- Parata, Hekia – Cabinet minister
- Parker, David – Cabinet minister
- Parry, Bill – Cabinet minister
- Paul, Tom
- Payne, John – Member of Parliament
- Peck, Mark – Member of Parliament
- Peters, Winston – deputy prime minister
- Phelan, Ted – local politician
- Pollen, Daniel – prime minister
- Pomare, Sir Maui – Member of Parliament
- Power, Simon – Cabinet minister
- Prebble, Richard – Cabinet minister
- Prime, Willow-Jean – Member of Parliament

== Q ==
- Quick, William Henry
- Quigley, Derek – Cabinet minister

== R ==
- Radhakrishnan, Priyanca – Member of Parliament
- Rata, Matiu – Member of Parliament
- Ratana, Matiu – Member of Parliament
- Rainbow, Stephen – local politician
- Read, John – local politician
- Reeves, William Pember – MP
- Revans, Samuel
- Rich, Katherine – Member of Parliament
- Richardson, Ruth – Cabinet minister
- Rigg, John
- Ritchie, Helene – local politician
- Roberts, James – local politician
- Robertson, Grant – Cabinet minister
- Robertson, John – Member of Parliament
- Robinson, David – Member of Parliament
- Robinson, Sir Dove-Meyer – Mayor of Auckland
- Robson, Matt – Member of Parliament
- Ross, Hilda – Cabinet minister
- Rosser, Arthur – local politician
- Rowling, Sir Wallace (Bill) – prime minister
- Russell, Deborah – Member of Parliament
- Ryall, Tony – Cabinet minister

== S ==
- Sage, Eugenie – Cabinet minister
- Salesa, Jenny – Cabinet minister
- Salmond, John
- Savage, Michael Joseph – prime minister
- Sayegh, Joe – local politician
- Scott, William John (Jack) – former Cabinet minister (1963–1969)
- Seddon, Richard – prime minister
- Semple, Bob – Cabinet minister
- Semple, Margaret – local politician
- Sepuloni, Carmel – Cabinet minister
- Seymour, David – Member of Parliament
- Sewell, Henry – prime minister
- Schramm, Bill – Speaker of the House
- Shadbolt, Tim – Mayor of Invercargill
- Shand, David – local politician
- Shaw, James – prime minister
- Shearer, David – Leader of the Opposition
- Sheat, William – Member of Parliament
- Shelton, Norman – former Cabinet minister (1960–1962)
- Shipley, Dame Jenny – New Zealand's first female prime minister (1997–1999)
- Shirley, Ken – Member of Parliament
- Sinclair, Suzanne – Member of Parliament
- Skinner, Jerry – deputy prime minister
- Smith, Lockwood – Speaker of the House
- Smith, Nick – prime minister
- Smuts-Kennedy, Olive – local politician
- Sowry, Roger – prime minister
- Spry, Keith – local politician
- Stafford, Edward – prime minister
- Statham, Sir Charles – Speaker of the House (1923–1935)
- Stewart, John – Member of Parliament
- Steward, William – Member of Parliament
- Stewart, William Downie Sr
- Stewart, William Downie Jr – Cabinet minister
- Stout, Sir Robert – premier
- Strange, Jamie – Member of Parliament
- Sullivan, Dan – Cabinet minister
- Sullivan, Whetu Tirikatene – Member of Parliament
- Sutton, Jim – Cabinet minister
- Swain, Paul – Cabinet minister

== T ==
- Tabuteau, Fletcher – Member of Parliament
- Tánczos, Nándor – Member of Parliament
- Talboys, Brian – deputy prime minister
- Tamihere, John – Cabinet minister
- Tanner, William
- Tapsell, Peter – Speaker of the House
- Tawhai, Hone Mohi
- Taylor, Tommy – Mayor of Christchurch
- Tennet, Elizabeth – Member of Parliament
- Te Heuheu, Georgina – Cabinet minister
- Thorn, Jim – Member of Parliament
- Thorn, Margaret – local politician
- Tinetti, Jan – Member of Parliament
- Tizard, Bob – deputy prime minister
- Tizard, Catherine – Mayor of Auckland
- Tizard, Judith – Cabinet minister
- Toop, Ernest – local politician
- Tregear, Edward – local politician
- Trevethick, Jonathan – local politician
- Turei, Metiria – Member of Parliament
- Turia, Tariana – Cabinet minister
- Turner, Sukhi – Mayor of Dunedin
- Twyford, Phil – Cabinet minister

== U ==
- Upton, Simon – Cabinet minister

== V ==
- Veitch, Bill – Cabinet minister
- Vinnell, Percy – local politician
- Vogel, Sir Julius – prime minister

== W ==
- Wade-Brown, Celia – Mayor of Wellington
- Wall, Gerard – Speaker of the House
- Wakefield, Edward Gibbon
- Wakefield, Jerningham
- Waring, Marilyn – Member of Parliament
- Ward, Sir Joseph – prime minister
- Ward, Mike – Member of Parliament
- Warren-Clark, Angie – Member of Parliament
- Waterhouse, George – prime minister
- Watt, Hugh – deputy prime minister
- Webb, Duncan – Member of Parliament
- Webb, Paddy – Cabinet minister
- Weld, Frederick – prime minister
- Whaitiri, Meka – Cabinet minister
- Whitaker, Frederick – prime minister
- Whitehead, Stanley – Speaker of the House
- Wilde, Dame Fran – Mayor of Wellington
- Williams, Morgan – Member of Parliament
- Williamson, Maurice – Cabinet minister
- Wilson, Margaret – Speaker of the House
- Wong, Pansy – Cabinet minister
- Wood, Michael – Member of Parliament
- Woods, Megan – Cabinet minister
- Worth, Richard – Cabinet minister
- Wright, John – Member of Parliament
- Wright, Robert – Mayor of Wellington

== Y ==
- Young, Venn – Member of Parliament
- Young, Jonathan – Member of Parliament

== See also ==
- Lists of New Zealanders
- List of governors-general of New Zealand
- List of prime ministers of New Zealand
