= 1935 Dunedin mayoral election =

Local election in New Zealand

- 8 May 1935
- Turnout: 28,118
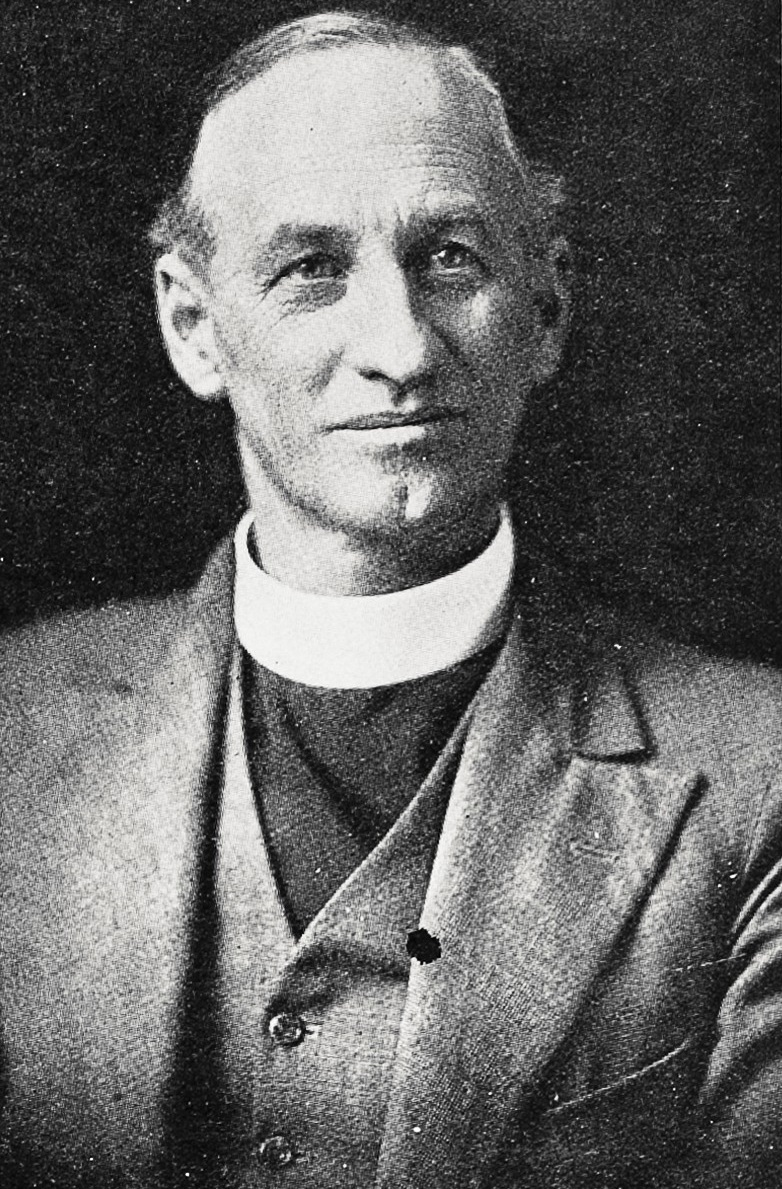

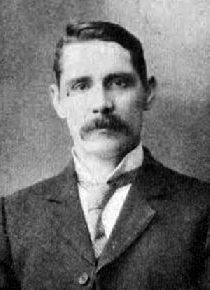
Candidate	Edwin Cox	James Marlow
Party	Labour	Citizens'
Popular vote	12,215	10,425
Percentage	43.44	37.07
Mayor before election
Edwin Cox
Elected mayor
Edwin Cox

The 1935 Dunedin mayoral election was part of the New Zealand local elections held that same year. In 1935, elections were held for the Mayor of Dunedin plus other local government positions including twelve city councillors. The polling was conducted using the standard first-past-the-post electoral method.

Edwin Cox, the incumbent Mayor, sought re-election and was successful in attaining a second-term. The Labour Party was also successful in securing a majority on the council for the first time.

== Mayoral results ==
1935 Dunedin mayoral election
Party	Candidate	Votes	%	±%
Labour	Edwin Cox	12,215	43.44	+2.56
Citizens'	James Marlow	10,425	37.07	
Independent	Robert Black	5,268	18.73	−14.75
Informal votes		210	0.74	+0.01
Majority		1,790	6.36	−1.04
Turnout		28,118		

== Council results ==
1935 Dunedin local election
Party	Candidate	Votes	%	±%
Labour	Fred Jones	15,746	55.99	+3.70
Labour	Gervan McMillan	15,461	54.98	
Labour	Jim Munro	15,131	53.81	−0.08
Labour	Mark Silverstone	14,745	52.43	+12.26
Citizens'	William Begg	13,354	47.49	+8.52
Citizens'	Walter Alexander Scott	13,121	46.66	+4.17
Citizens'	Andrew Allen	12,911	45.91	+5.61
Citizens'	Francis William Mitchell	12,723	45.24	
Citizens'	William Henry Sheppard	12,404	44.11	+4.62
Citizens'	Donald Cameron	12,066	42.91	
Labour	Peter Neilson	12,034	42.79	+5.54
Labour	William Batchelor	11,779	41.89	+6.42
Citizens'	Robert Walls	11,757	41.81	+7.07
Labour	Ralph Harrison (Note: Harrison was appointed to the council in December 1937 to fill the vacancy caused by the resignation of Fred Jones.)	11,411	40.58	+3.17
Citizens'	Henry Louis Paterson	11,338	40.32	
Citizens'	William Julian Bardsley	11,220	39.90	
Citizens'	Jackson Purdie	11,207	39.85	
Labour	Michael Connelly	11,191	39.80	
Labour	Phil Connolly	11,024	39.20	+3.17
Labour	James Harrison	10,875	38.67	
Citizens'	Alfred Clark	10,797	38.39	
Citizens'	John McIndoe	10,794	38.38	−5.20
Labour	John Robinson	10,773	38.31	
Labour	Bryan O'Donnell	10,140	36.06	+4.63
Independent	Charles Andrew Wilson	9,512	33.82	
Independent	Henry Alexander Hamer	3,943	14.02	−13.26
Independent	Alexander William Martin	3,148	11.19	
Independent	Cornelius Machin Moss	2,325	8.26	
Communist	Arthur Basil Powell	1,082	3.84	
Communist	Samuel Ikin	799	2.84	

Table footnotes:
