= 1941 Dunedin mayoral election =

Local election in New Zealand

- 17 May 1941
- Turnout: 26,715
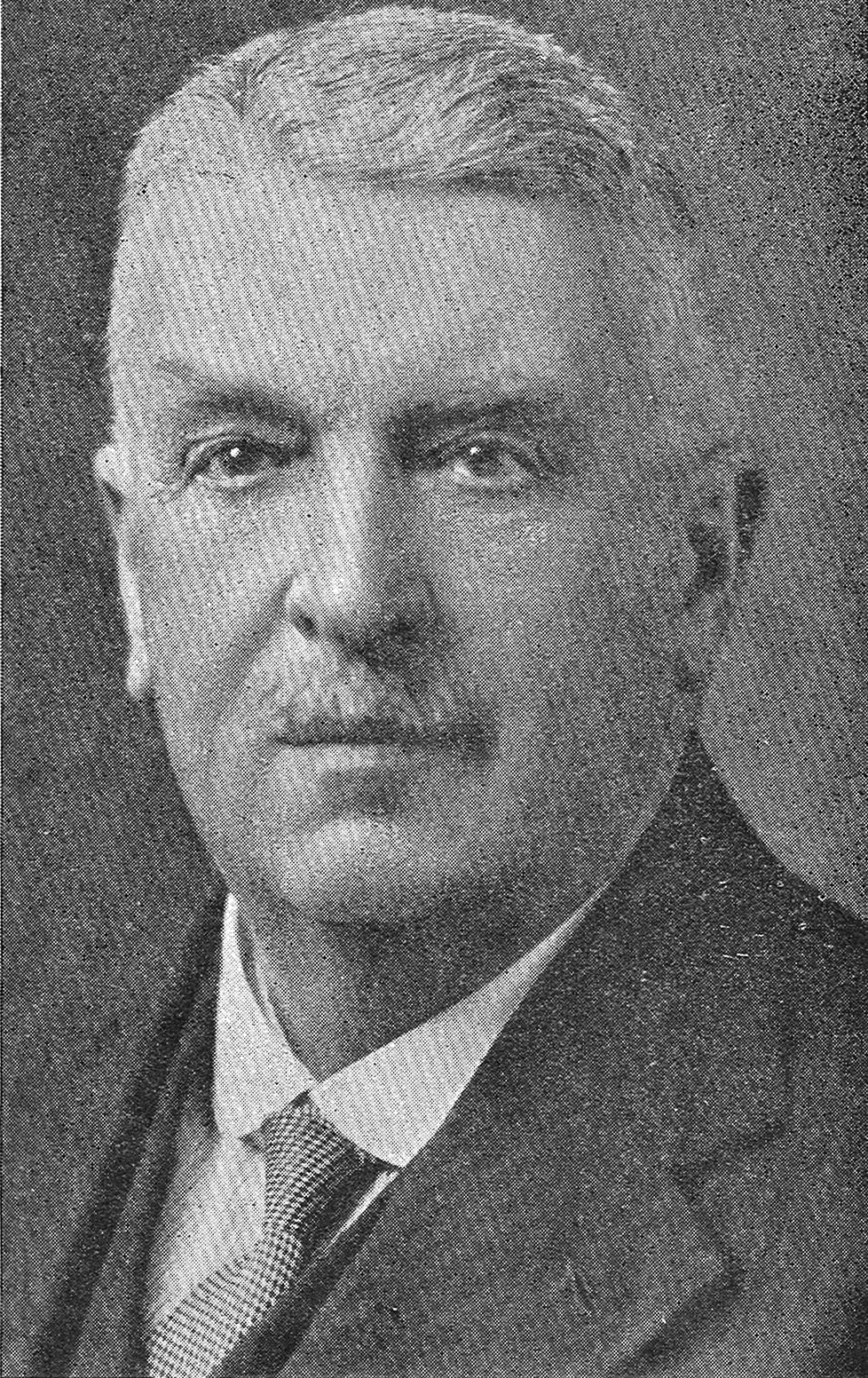

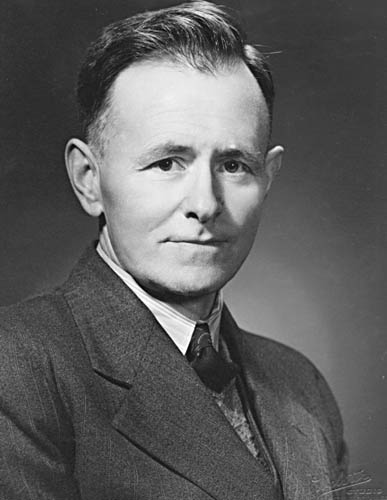
Candidate	Andrew Allen	Gervan McMillan
Party	Citizens'	Labour
Popular vote	13,685	12,524
Percentage	51.22	46.88
Mayor before election
Andrew Allen
Elected mayor
Andrew Allen

The 1941 Dunedin mayoral election was part of the New Zealand local elections held that same year. In 1941, elections were held for the Mayor of Dunedin plus other local government positions including twelve city councillors. The polling was conducted using the standard first-past-the-post electoral method.

Andrew Allen, the incumbent Mayor, sought re-election for a second term. He was successful, defeating a strong challenge by Gervan McMillan the Labour MP for Dunedin West.

== Mayoral results ==
1941 Dunedin mayoral election
Party	Candidate	Votes	%	±%
Citizens'	Andrew Allen	13,685	51.22	−5.35
Labour	Gervan McMillan	12,524	46.88	
Independent	Oprah Jones-Neilson	301	1.12	
Informal votes		205	0.76	+0.10
Majority		1,161	4.34	−8.81
Turnout		26,715		

== Council results ==
1941 Dunedin local election
Party	Candidate	Votes	%	±%
Labour	Phil Connolly	15,364	57.51	+5.65
Citizens'	Donald Cameron	15,288	57.22	+4.16
Labour	Robert Walls	14,419	53.97	+5.94
Citizens'	John McRae	13,836	51.79	+4.39
Citizens'	William Taverner	13,480	50.45	+4.58
Citizens'	John Wilson	13,473	50.43	+0.91
Labour	Jim Munro	13,316	49.84	+2.26
Citizens'	Matthew Cochrane Henderson	13,115	49.09	+0.37
Citizens'	Len Wright	13,073	48.93	
Citizens'	Edmund J. Smith	12,878	48.20	+2.54
Citizens'	David Charles Jolly	12,839	48.05	
Citizens'	Leonard James Tobin Ireland	12,695	47.52	
Citizens'	Thomas Cassels Ross	12,426	46.51	
Labour	Peter Neilson	12,395	46.39	+2.46
Labour	Michael Connelly	12,353	46.23	+3.74
Labour	Wally Hudson	12,255	45.87	
Labour	Ethel McMillan	11,814	44.22	
Labour	Warrington McCarter Taylor	11,755	44.00	
Labour	George Hunter Boyes	11,704	43.81	
Labour	Edwin Cox	11,474	42.94	
Labour	John McManus	11,008	41.20	−1.67
Labour	Mark Silverstone	10,155	38.01	−3.49
Independent	Gertrude Brooks	2,820	10.55	+4.85
Independent	Cornelius Machin Moss	1,913	7.16	+0.97
Communist	Samuel Ikin	1,250	4.67	
