= 1938 Dunedin mayoral election =

Local election in New Zealand

- 11 May 1938
- Turnout: 32,032
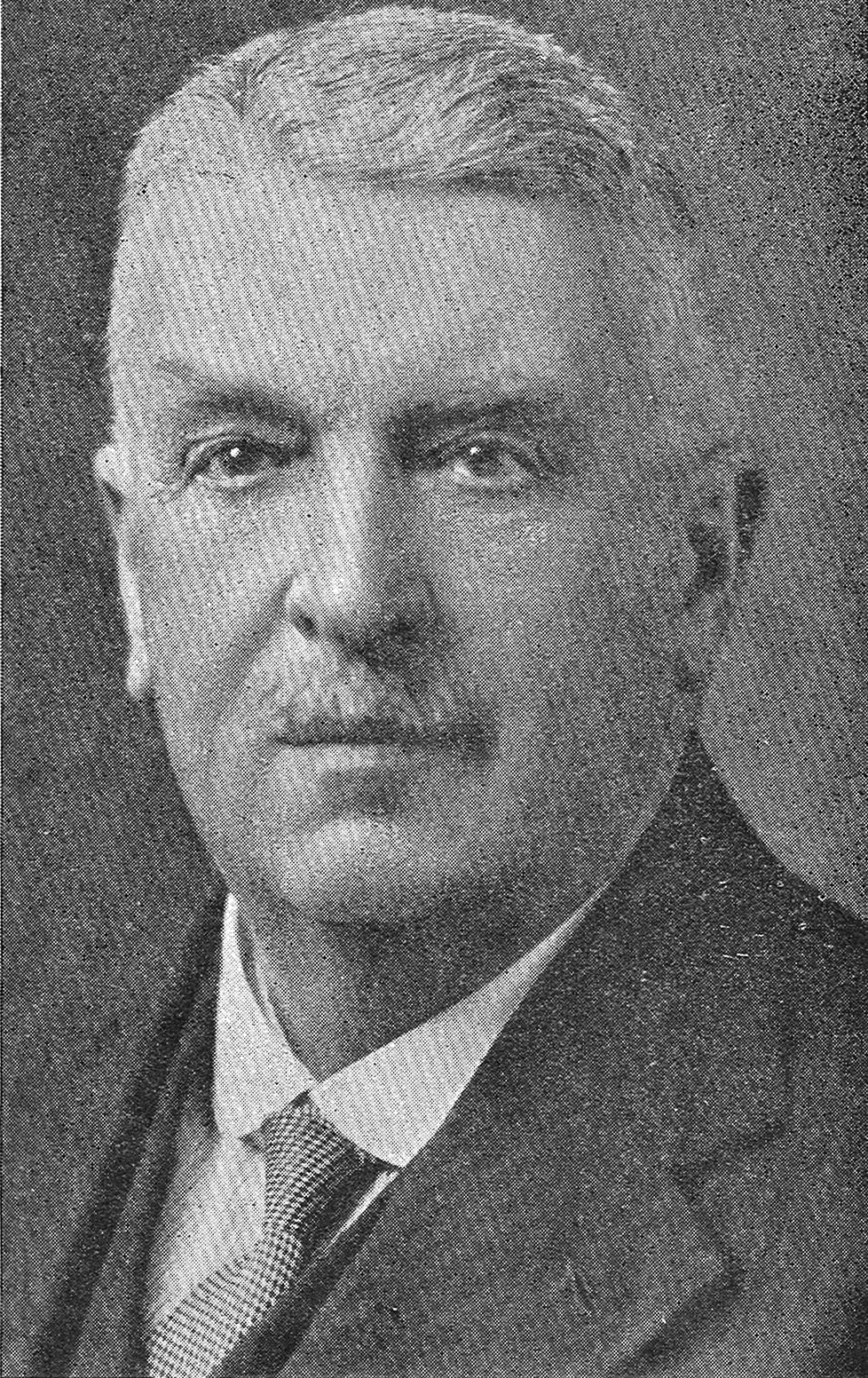

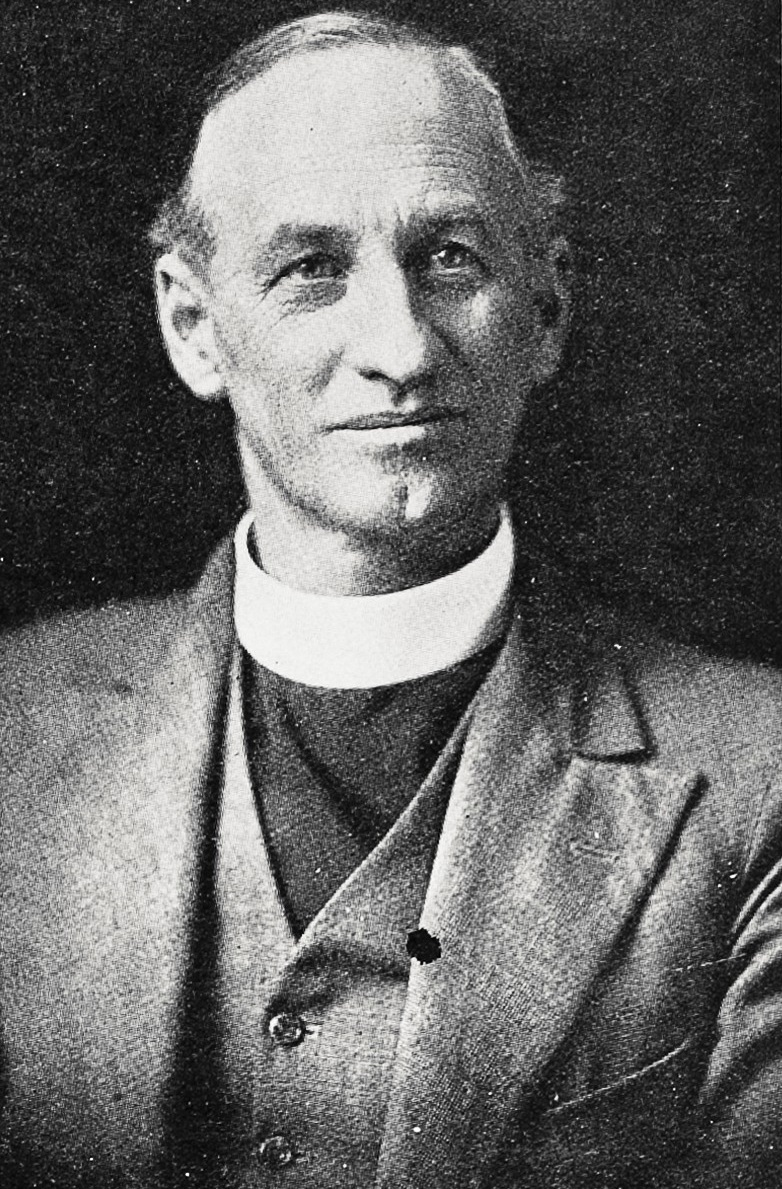
Candidate	Andrew Allen	Edwin Cox
Party	Citizens'	Labour
Popular vote	17,929	13,891
Percentage	55.97	43.36
Mayor before election
Edwin Cox
Elected mayor
Andrew Allen

The 1938 Dunedin mayoral election was part of the New Zealand local elections held that same year. In 1938, elections were held for the Mayor of Dunedin plus other local government positions including twelve city councillors. The polling was conducted using the standard first-past-the-post electoral method.

Edwin Cox, the incumbent Mayor, sought re-election for a third term, a feat never before achieved in Dunedin. Cox was unsuccessful in this and was beaten by Andrew Allen.

== Mayoral results ==
1938 Dunedin mayoral election
Party	Candidate	Votes	%	±%
Citizens'	Andrew Allen	17,929	55.97	
Labour	Edwin Cox	13,891	43.36	−0.08
Informal votes		212	0.66	−0.08
Majority		4,038	12.60	
Turnout		32,032		

== Council results ==
1938 Dunedin local election
Party	Candidate	Votes	%	±%
Citizens'	Donald Cameron	16,997	53.06	+10.15
Citizens'	William Henry Borrie	16,588	51.78	
Labour	Gervan McMillan	16,226	50.65	−4.33
Citizens'	William Henry Sheppard	16,193	50.55	+6.44
Citizens'	John Wilson	15,864	49.52	
Citizens'	Matthew Cochrane Henderson	15,608	48.72	
Labour	Robert Walls	15,386	48.03	+6.22
Labour	Jim Munro	15,244	47.58	−6.23
Citizens'	John McRae	15,186	47.40	
Citizens'	Henry Lewis Gibson	15,020	46.89	
Citizens'	William Taverner	14,694	45.87	
Citizens'	Edmund J. Smith	14,626	45.66	
Citizens'	Herbert Alfred Newall	14,258	44.51	
Labour	Peter Neilson	14,073	43.93	−1.14
Labour	Ralph Harrison	13,969	43.60	+3.02
Labour	Phil Connolly	13,839	43.20	+4.00
Labour	John McManus	13,734	42.87	
Labour	Michael Connelly	13,611	42.49	+2.69
Labour	Edwin Sincock	13,579	42.39	
Independent	William Begg	13,538	42.26	−5.23
Independent	Walter Alexander Scott	13,359	41.70	−4.96
Labour	Mark Silverstone	13,295	41.50	−10.93
Labour	Bryan O'Donnell	12,152	37.93	−1.87
Labour	Alice Herbert	11,873	37.06	
Independent	James Douglas	6,812	21.26	
Independent	Oprah Jones-Neilson	2,283	7.12	
Independent	Cornelius Machin Moss	1,984	6.19	−2.07
Independent	Gertrude Brooks	1,829	5.70	
