= 1944 Dunedin mayoral election =

Local election in New Zealand

- 27 May 1944
- Turnout: 31,251 (70.16%)
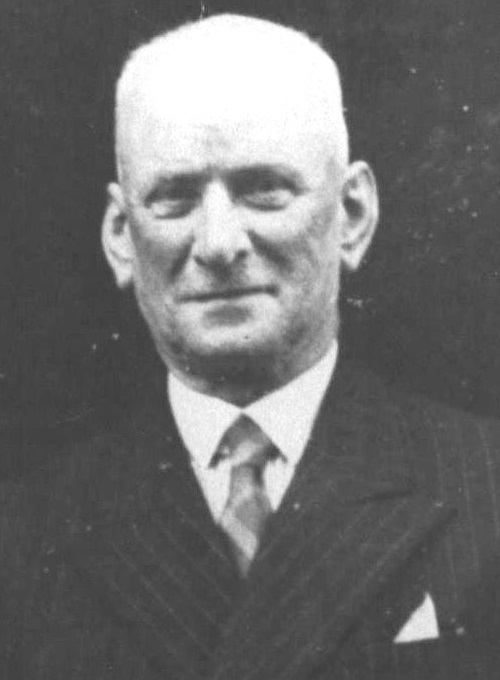

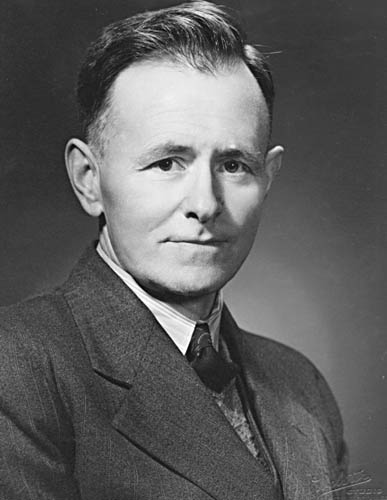
| Candidate | Donald Cameron | Gervan McMillan |
| Party | Citizens' | Labour |
| Popular vote | 15,859 | 15,169 |
| Percentage | 50.74 | 48.53 |
Mayor before election
Andrew Allen
Elected mayor
Donald Cameron

The 1944 Dunedin mayoral election was part of the New Zealand local elections held that same year. In 1944, elections were held for the Mayor of Dunedin plus other local government positions including twelve city councillors. The polling was conducted using the standard first-past-the-post electoral method.

== Background ==
Andrew Henson Allen, the incumbent Mayor, declined to run for a third term. Gervan McMillan the retired Labour MP for Dunedin West contested the mayoralty for a second time, but was narrowly defeated by councillor Donald Cameron. McMillan did, however, win a seat on the council.

Labour gained ground on the city council, winning six of the twelve seats, with three Citizens' councillors seeking re-election defeated. A recount was called for the city council poll by a Labour candidate Mark Silverstone. It changed the result slightly with Michael Connelly displacing Wally Hudson as the lowest polling successful candidate. It did not alter the party strength on the council as both had run as Labour candidates. The council viewed judged the recount to be unjustified and charged Silverstone to cover the cost of the recounting efforts.

== Mayoral results ==
1944 Dunedin mayoral election
| Party | Candidate | Votes | % | ±% |
|---|---|---|---|---|
| Citizens' | Donald Cameron | 15,859 | 50.74 | |
| Labour | Gervan McMillan | 15,169 | 48.53 | +1.65 |
| Informal votes | | 223 | 0.71 | −0.05 |
| Majority | | 690 | 2.20 | |
| Turnout | | 31,251 | 70.16 | |

== Council results ==
1944 Dunedin local election
| Party | Candidate | Votes | % | ±% |
|---|---|---|---|---|
| Labour | Robert Walls | 16,918 | 54.13 | +0.16 |
| Labour | Phil Connolly | 16,068 | 51.41 | −6.10 |
| Labour | Gervan McMillan | 15,575 | 49.83 | |
| Citizens' | John McRae | 15,406 | 49.29 | −2.50 |
| Labour | Jim Munro | 15,400 | 49.27 | −0.57 |
| Labour | Meynell Blain | 15,377 | 49.20 | |
| Citizens' | Leonard James Tobin Ireland | 14,966 | 47.88 | −0.36 |
| Citizens' | Robert Forsyth-Barr | 14,957 | 47.86 | |
| Citizens' | Len Wright | 14,893 | 47.65 | −1.37 |
| Citizens' | David Charles Jolly | 14,838 | 47.48 | −0.57 |
| Citizens' | William Taverner | 14,748 | 47.19 | −3.26 |
| Labour | Michael Connelly | 14,722 | 47.11 | +0.88 |
| Labour | Wally Hudson (Note: Hudson was appointed to the council in 1945 to fill the vacancy caused by the death of Jim Munro.) | 14,720 | 47.10 | +1.23 |
| Citizens' | William Stewart Armitage | 14,764 | 47.24 | |
| Independent | Charlie Hayward | 14,672 | 46.94 | |
| Citizens' | Edmund J. Smith | 14,650 | 46.87 | −1.33 |
| Citizens' | John Wilson | 14,503 | 46.40 | −4.03 |
| Labour | Hubert Brown | 14,036 | 44.91 | |
| Labour | William Robert Clarke | 13,937 | 44.59 | |
| Citizens' | William Wallace Callender | 13,873 | 44.39 | |
| Labour | William Benedict Richards | 13,656 | 43.69 | |
| Citizens' | Matthew Cochrane Henderson | 13,458 | 43.06 | −6.03 |
| Labour | Mark Silverstone | 13,398 | 42.87 | +4.86 |
| Labour | Wilfred Claude McDonnell | 12,776 | 40.88 | |
| Independent | Robert Bell Middlemiss | 3,640 | 11.64 | |

Table footnotes:
