= 1933 Dunedin mayoral election =

Local election in New Zealand

- 4 May 1933
- Turnout: 26,295
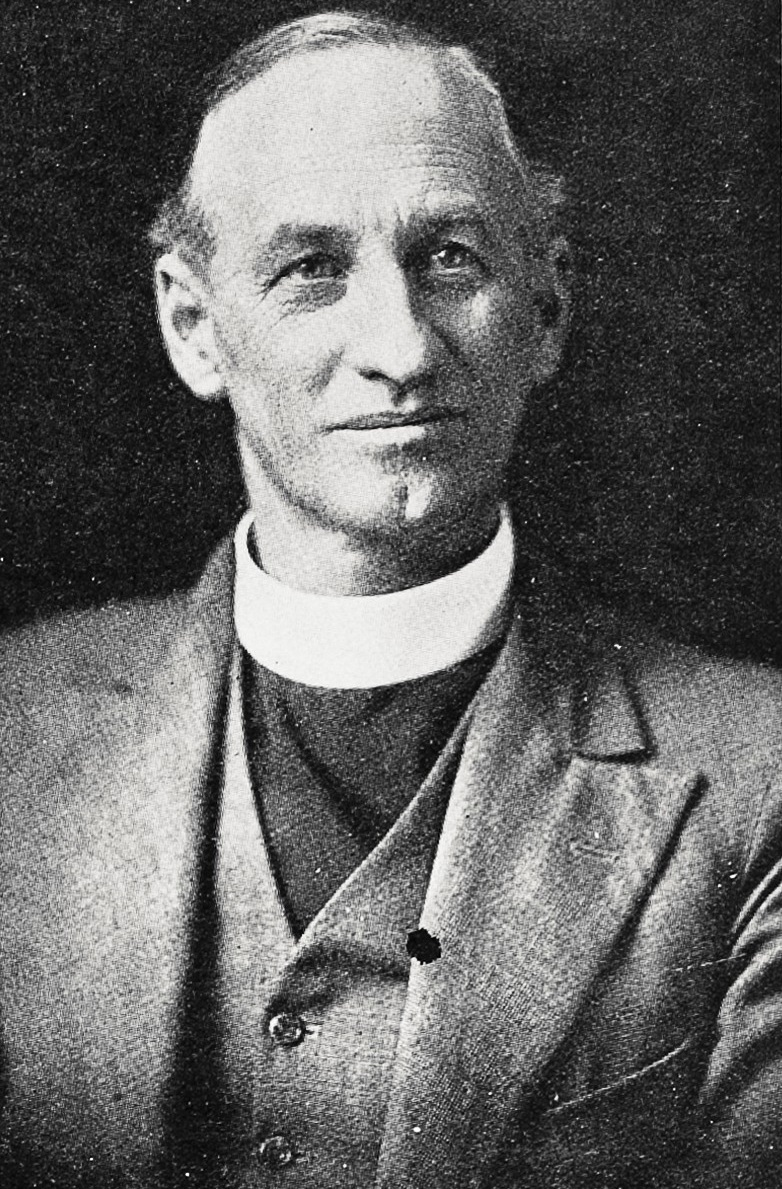

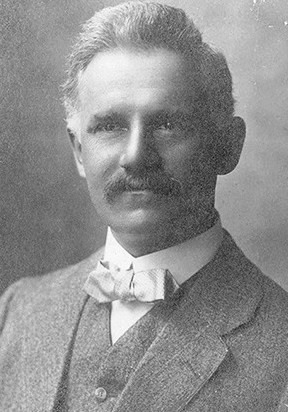
| Candidate | Edwin Cox | Robert Black |
| Party | Independent | Citizens' |
| Popular vote | 10,751 | 8,805 |
| Percentage | 40.88 | 33.48 |
Mayor before election
Robert Black
Elected mayor
Edwin Cox

The 1933 Dunedin mayoral election was part of the New Zealand local elections held that same year. In 1933, elections were held for the Mayor of Dunedin plus other local government positions including twelve city councillors. The polling was conducted using the standard first-past-the-post electoral method.

Robert Black, the incumbent Mayor, sought re-election but was defeated by Edwin Cox, a clergyman who had the backing of the Labour movement.

== Mayoralty results ==
1933 Dunedin mayoral election
| Party | Candidate | Votes | % | ±% |
|---|---|---|---|---|
| Independent | Edwin Cox | 10,751 | 40.88 | |
| Citizens' | Robert Black | 8,805 | 33.48 | −17.79 |
| Independent | Francis William Mitchell | 6,225 | 23.67 | |
| Communist | Michael O'Rorke | 217 | 0.82 | |
| Independent | Cornelius Machin Moss | 103 | 0.39 | |
| Informal votes | | 194 | 0.73 | +0.25 |
| Majority | | 1,946 | 7.40 | |
| Turnout | | 26,295 | | |

== Council results ==
1933 Dunedin local election
| Party | Candidate | Votes | % | ±% |
|---|---|---|---|---|
| Labour | Jim Munro | 14,171 | 53.89 | +6.54 |
| Labour | Fred Jones | 13,750 | 52.29 | +18.14 |
| Citizens' | William Henry Borrie | 11,505 | 43.75 | |
| Citizens' | John McIndoe | 11,461 | 43.58 | −3.31 |
| Citizens' | Walter Alexander Scott | 11,175 | 42.49 | |
| Citizens' | James Marlow | 10,859 | 41.29 | −5.86 |
| Citizens' | John Shacklock | 10,718 | 40.76 | −9.87 |
| Citizens' | Andrew Allen | 10,597 | 40.30 | −7.47 |
| Labour | Mark Silverstone | 10,563 | 40.17 | +8.50 |
| Citizens' | William Henry Sheppard | 10,386 | 39.49 | |
| Citizens' | William Begg | 10,248 | 38.97 | −9.30 |
| Citizens' | Herbert Cecil Campbell | 9,969 | 37.91 | |
| Labour | Ralph Harrison | 9,838 | 37.41 | +6.67 |
| Labour | Peter Neilson | 9,795 | 37.25 | +8.95 |
| Labour | John Gilchrist | 9,787 | 37.22 | |
| Citizens' | John Wilson | 9,618 | 36.57 | −5.69 |
| Citizens' | William Hector Carson | 9,356 | 35.58 | |
| Labour | William Batchelor | 9,328 | 35.47 | |
| Citizens' | Robert Walls | 9,135 | 34.74 | |
| Labour | Phil Connolly | 8,990 | 34.18 | |
| Labour | Bryan O'Donnell | 8,267 | 31.43 | |
| Citizens' | William Taverner | 8,194 | 31.16 | |
| Labour | May Don | 8,169 | 31.06 | |
| Labour | Albert Payton | 7,843 | 29.82 | |
| Labour | Evelyne Bennet | 7,239 | 27.52 | |
| Independent | Henry Alexander Hamer | 7,174 | 27.28 | −3.47 |
