= 1931 Dunedin mayoral election =

Local election in New Zealand

- 6 May 1931
- Turnout: 21,108
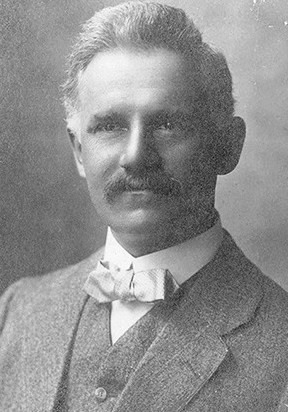

Candidate	Robert Black	Walter Alexander Scott
Party	Citizens'	Independent
Popular vote	10,824	10,181
Percentage	51.27	48.23
Mayor before election
Robert Black
Elected mayor
Robert Black

The 1931 Dunedin mayoral election was part of the New Zealand local elections held that same year. In 1931, elections were held for the Mayor of Dunedin plus other local government positions including twelve city councillors. The polling was conducted using the standard first-past-the-post electoral method.

== Mayoral results ==
1931 Dunedin mayoral election
Party	Candidate	Votes	%	±%
Citizens'	Robert Black	10,824	51.27	+14.79
Independent	Walter Alexander Scott	10,181	48.23	
Informal votes		103	0.48	
Majority		643	3.04	
Turnout		21,108		

== Council results ==
1931 Dunedin local election
Party	Candidate	Votes	%	±%
Citizens'	Francis William Mitchell	10,961	51.92	+12.02
Citizens'	John Shacklock	10,688	50.63	+5.05
Citizens'	James Clark	10,680	50.59	+2.20
Citizens'	Charles Henry Hayward	10,679	50.59	
Citizens'	Harold Tapley	10,413	49.33	+9.95
Citizens'	William Begg	10,284	48.72	+15.32
Citizens'	Andrew Allen	10,084	47.77	
Labour	Jim Munro	9,996	47.35	+2.37
Citizens'	James Marlow	9,954	47.15	+11.52
Citizens'	John McIndoe	9,899	46.89	
Citizens'	Frank Wilkinson	9,170	43.44	+9.70
Citizens'	John Wilson	8,921	42.26	+4.36
Citizens'	Edwin Sincock	8,195	38.82	+14.42
Labour	Fred Jones	7,209	34.15	
Labour	Mark Silverstone	6,686	31.67	+16.94
Independent	David Larnach	6,624	31.38	+1.22
Independent	Henry Alexander Hamer	6,491	30.75	
Labour	Ralph Harrison	6,489	30.74	+9.11
Labour	Arthur Paape	6,486	30.72	+5.22
Labour	Alexander John Morison	6,366	30.15	+16.28
Labour	John Robinson	6,355	30.10	+8.29
Labour	Peter Neilson	5,974	28.30	+10.81
Independent	Christopher Henry Wing	4,962	23.50	
Independent	Cornelius Machin Moss	4,933	23.37	+8.48
Independent	Daniel Minnock	3,819	18.09	+5.79
