= Helen Black (mayoress) =

New Zealand politician and community worker (1896–1963)

Helen McKenzie Black MBE (née Murray; 16 August 1896 – 17 October 1963) was a New Zealand mayoress and community worker. She was born in Aberdeen, Aberdeenshire, Scotland, on 16 August 1896. On 3 December 1924, she married Robert Black, who was mayor of Dunedin from 1929 to 1933.

Her husband stood in the 1931 election in the Dunedin North electorate as an independent candidate in support of the United Party, but withdrew shortly before the election, too late for his name to be removed from the ballot. She stood in Dunedin North in the 1935 election for the Democrat Party and came a distant third; she was one of only three women who stood for election that year. Black stood again in 1954 for the National Party.

In the 1952 New Year Honours, Black was appointed a Member of the Order of the British Empire, for social welfare services.
