= Mary King (teacher) =

New Zealand teacher, activist (1884–1967)

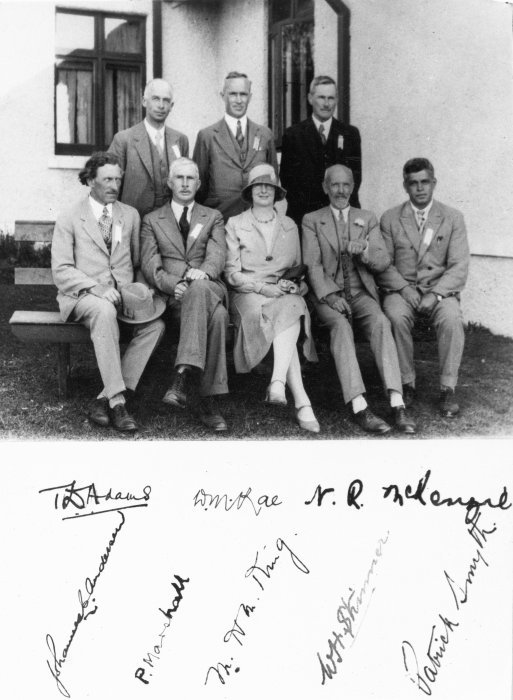
King (seated, centre) with other educators in 1930

Mary Harriet McGowan King (11 February 1884 – 27 June 1967) was a New Zealand teacher, principal, businesswoman and political activist. She was born in Oamaru, Otago, New Zealand.

== Politics ==
King was a founding member of the Social Credit Party and was president of the party from 1962 to 1963. At both the 1954 and 1957 elections she stood, as the Social Credit candidate in Dunedin Central, finishing third on both occasions.
