= Brian MacDonell =

New Zealand politician

Brian MacDonell QSO
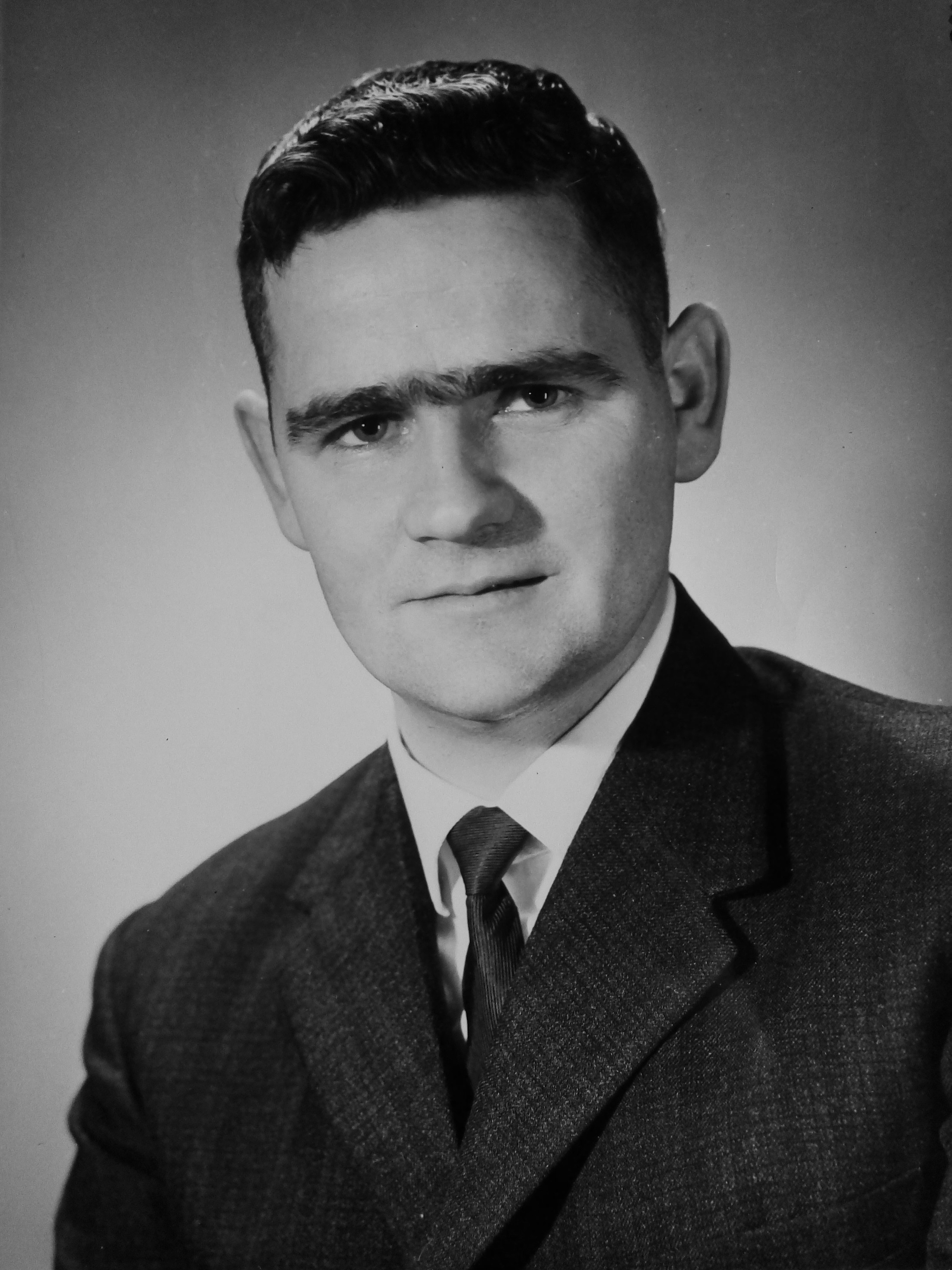
- MacDonell in 1963

Member of the New Zealand Parliament for Dunedin Central
- In office 30 November 1963 – 14 July 1984
- Preceded by: Phil Connolly
- Succeeded by: Constituency abolished

Personal details
- Born: 19 May 1935 (age 91) Dunedin, New Zealand
- Party: Labour
- Spouse: Joan Banwell
- Children: 4
- Occupation: Banker

Brian Peter MacDonell QSO (born 19 May 1935) is a former New Zealand Member of Parliament for Dunedin Central in the South Island.

== Early life and career ==
He was born in Dunedin on 19 May 1935, the son of Roderick MacDonell. He received his education at Christian Brothers High School, since renamed Kavanagh College. He became active with the labour movement in 1950. In 1958, he married Joan Banwell, the daughter of William Banwell. The MacDonells have four sons. MacDonell worked for a bank from 1953 to 1963, and was a national councillor for the New Zealand bank officers union.

== Political career ==
New Zealand Parliament
Years	Term	Electorate	Party
1963–1966	34th	Dunedin Central	Labour
1966–1969	35th	Dunedin Central	Labour
1969–1972	36th	Dunedin Central	Labour
1972–1975	37th	Dunedin Central	Labour
1975–1978	38th	Dunedin Central	Labour
1978–1981	39th	Dunedin Central	Labour
1981–1983	40th	Dunedin Central	Labour
1983–1984	Changed allegiance to:		Independent

MacDonell first attempted to enter politics at the 1959 local-body elections when he stood unsuccessfully for the Dunedin City Council on the Labour Party ticket. He stood for the council again in 1962 and was likewise unsuccessful.

He represented the Dunedin Central electorate in Parliament for 21 years from 1963 to 1984. He was Parliamentary Under-Secretary to the Minister of Trade and Industry (1973–1975) and to the Minister of Energy Resources (1974–1975). Following the Royal Commission on Contraception, Sterilisation and Abortion, parliament discussed legislation to legalise abortion, and MacDonell supported his pro-life stance by holding a jar with a pickled 12-week-old foetus during the debate. Parliament passed the Contraception, Sterilisation, and Abortion Act 1977. MacDonell was Shadow Minister of Customs and Shadow Postmaster-General from 1975 to 1983 under Bill Rowling.

The Dunedin Central electorate was abolished in the 1983 electoral redistribution, and the electorate of Dunedin West was established in its place. MacDonell was not selected as the Labour candidate for the new electorate of Dunedin West; instead, the party's president, Jim Anderton, installed his personal friend Clive Matthewson. MacDonell left the party and became an independent. He worked closely in the house with another Labour MP turned independent, John Kirk, as well as the two Social Credit Party's MPs Bruce Beetham and Gary Knapp. The quartet appointed MacDonell as the groups whip to boost their recognition in parliament. At the 1984 general election he was not successful standing for re-election.

MacDonell was later elected a member of the Dunedin City Council at the 1995 local-body elections representing the South Dunedin ward for three years.

== Later activities ==
As of 2013, MacDonell resided in Tasmania, Australia. He enjoys fishing for recreation.

== Honours and awards ==
In 1977, MacDonell was awarded the Queen Elizabeth II Silver Jubilee Medal, and in 1990 he received the New Zealand 1990 Commemoration Medal. In the 1993 New Year Honours, he was appointed a Companion of the Queen's Service Order for public services.

== Notes ==
New Zealand Parliament
Preceded by Phil Connolly	Member of Parliament for Dunedin Central; 1963–1984	Constituency abolished
