= 1886 Dunedin Central by-election =

New Zealand by-election

The 1886 Dunedin Central by-election was a by-election held on 19 October 1886 in the Dunedin Central electorate during the 9th New Zealand Parliament.

The by-election was caused by the death on 1 September of the incumbent MP James Benn Bradshaw. The by-election was won by Thomas Bracken.

William Hutchison who was interested in standing in both Wellington and Dunedin seats, and who had represented Wellington South in parliament was a controversial candidate. There were suggestions that Mr Bracken had agreed to stand down.

== Results ==
The following table gives the election result:

1886 Dunedin Central by-election
Party	Candidate	Votes	%	±%
Independent	Thomas Bracken	501	59.71	
Independent	William Hutchison	255	30.39	
Independent	Charles Robert Chapman	80	9.54	
Independent	William Darling	3	0.36	
Majority		246	29.32	
Informal votes		8		
Turnout		847		
