= 1915 Dunedin Central by-election =

New Zealand by-election

← 1914 general	3 February 1915	1919 general →
- Turnout: 7,959 (84.55%)
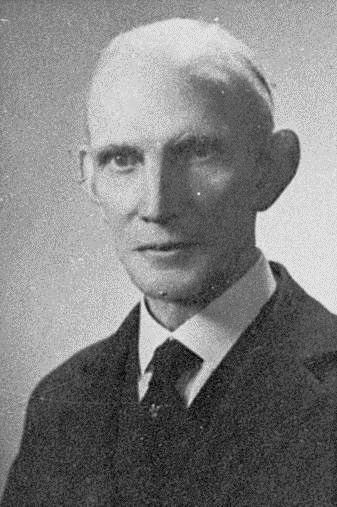

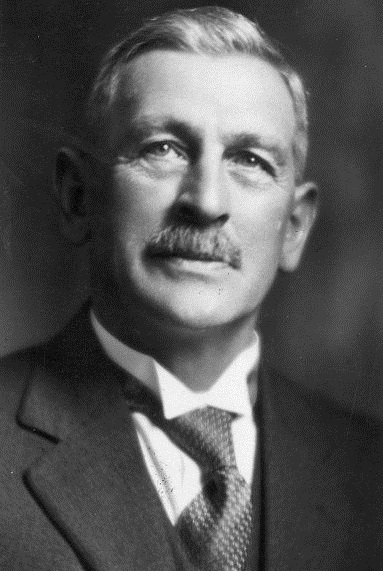
Candidate	Charles Statham	Jim Munro
Party	Reform	United Labour
Popular vote	4,033	3,926
Percentage	50.67%	49.33%
Member before election
Charles Statham
Reform
Elected Member
Charles Statham
Reform

The Dunedin Central by-election of 1915 was a by-election during the 19th New Zealand Parliament held on 3 February in the Dunedin Central electorate. The by-election was sparked by the resignation of the incumbent, Charles Statham, after irregularities in the counting of the vote during the 1914 general election turned a 10-vote lead for his competitor Jim Munro into a 12-vote loss. There were only two nominees.

== Background ==
On election night 1914 Jim Munro had a provisional lead of one vote in Dunedin Central. Due to the closeness of the polling there were several re-counts of the ballots which took many days. To general surprise the final magisterial re-count resulted in the seat being awarded to Charles Statham by a 12 vote margin. It was soon revealed however that this was due to a "careless" polling clerk scribbling notes and numbers on ballot papers (rather than counterfoil). All affected ballot papers just happened to be votes for Munro and were thus declared void. If included the 22 disqualified votes would have resulted in a 10 vote final victory for Munro.

Under the circumstances Statham felt honour bound to resign the seat, though he was in no way obligated to do so. He did and thereby triggered a by-election. The Reform government had a bare minimum majority and therefore much was at stake. As a result the Liberal Party did not contest the election and its leader Sir Joseph Ward actively toured the electorate to encourage the electors to vote for Munro. In the event of a Labour victory it was conceivable for Ward to form a minority government with Labour support.

== Results ==
The following table gives the election results:

1915 Dunedin Central by-election
Party	Candidate	Votes	%	±%
Reform	Charles Statham	4,033	50.67	+0.59
United Labour	Jim Munro	3,926	49.33	−0.62
Informal votes		11	0.13	−2.53
Majority		107	1.34	+1.18
Turnout		7,959	84.55	+2.97
Registered electors		9,413		

=== Results by locality ===
Following table showcases the detailed results by locality by ballot location:

Locality	Statham (Reform)		Munro (ULP)		Winner
Locality	Votes	%	Votes	%	Winner
Baptist Hall	200	48.54	212	51.46	Munro
Berwick's Store	192	55.98	151	44.02	Statham
Caversham	153	40.58	224	59.42	Munro
Council Chambers	630	59.15	435	40.85	Statham
Green Island Church	66	33.84	129	51.16	Munro
High Street School	191	79.91	48	20.09	Statham
Kirkland Hall	256	39.26	396	64.64	Munro
Methodist Church	146	60.08	97	39.92	Statham
Odd Fellows' Hall	150	26.64	413	73.35	Munro
Old Council Chambers	152	51.17	145	48.83	Statham
Russell Street	251	56.27	195	43.73	Statham
Victoria Hall	819	46.45	944	53.55	Munro
Walker Street	629	58.45	447	41.55	Statham
Absentees & Seamen	186	64.58	102	35.42	Statham
Total	4,033	50.67	3,926	49.33	Statham

== Aftermath ==
As a result of Statham's victory, the government retained its scant 41:39 majority, allowing them to continue in office. At the next general election in 1919 Statham once again defeated Munro. Statham was to remain MP for Dunedin Central until he retired at the 1935 general election. Munro won election to Parliament at another by-election in 1922 for the neighboring seat of Dunedin North.
