= God's Own Country =

Phrase

"God's Own Country" is a phrase meaning a country, region or place supposedly favoured by God or closer to God.

== Australia ==
In Australia, the phrase "God's own country" was often used to describe the country in the early 1900s, but it appears to have gradually fallen out of favour, largely to be replaced by "The Lucky Country". The phrase "God's Country" is often used to describe Queensland and the Sutherland Shire in southern Sydney.

== Brazil ==
The idea of "God's own country", worded as "Deus é brasileiro" (Portuguese: "God is Brazilian"), is a common trope in Brazilian culture to inspire optimism and point out the country has vast resources but faces few natural disasters nor international conflict. It is referenced by politicians and artworks, as in the movie God Is Brazilian.

== England ==
=== Surrey ===
Edward du Bois used the phrase in a poem describing the English county of Surrey in 1839.

=== Yorkshire ===
"God's Own Country" has been used to describe Yorkshire, a region of northern England. The term "God's Own County" has also been used.

== India ==
=== Keralam ===
The official logo of Kerala Tourism

“God’s Own Country’ is the tagline of Keralam Tourism which was coined by Walter Mendez, the creative director of an Indian advertising agency in 1989 at the request of the Tourism Department and the Government of Keralam.

This was used by agencies to showcase Keralam's natural beauty and not-so-explored places across the state.

Keralam Tourism has won several awards for its innovative tourism campaign. Each of them depicted God's Own Country in a new light, ensuring that the tagline continues to be associated with Keralam.

The description of Kerala as "God's own country" can additionally be traced to the event known as Thrippadidanam in 1749, the then ruler Marthanda Varma, Maharaja of Travancore, decided to "donate" his realm to Padmanabha (Vishnu) and thereafter rule as the deity's "viceregent" (Sri Padmanabha Dasa). ('Dasa' meaning Servant or Slave.).

==== Mythology ====
Apart from various legends of the origin of the Keralam, the slogan alludes to the variety of faiths in the state: Hindus, Muslims, Christians, Buddhists, Jains, Jews, and Parsis (Zoroastrians) have coexisted harmoniously for centuries, as attested by the mishmash of temples, towers, spires and synagogues.

The Matsya Purana, one of the oldest of the 18 Puranas, uses the Malaya Mountains of Kerala as the setting for the story of Matsya, the first incarnation of Vishnu, and Manu, the first man and the king of the region. These Puranic accounts portray Keralam as "God’s own country", or the land favoured by God.

Another character from the Puranas associated with Keralam is Mahabali, an Asura and a prototypical just king. According to regional belief, Mahabali ruled Keralam with great justice and was beloved by his people. However, the gods grew jealous of Mahabali's growing fame and power, and feared he was becoming too powerful. They begged Lord Vishnu to stop Mahabali. Vishnu incarnated as Vamana and, playing on Mahabali's benevolence, tricked Mahabali into giving up his kingdom, and exiled him to Patala, the netherworld. Vishnu, seeing the devotion of Mahabali, blessed him to be the Indra of the next Manvantara and granted him his request that once a year, during the Onam festival, Mahabali could return to his kingdom to visit his people. It is said that Vishnu guards Mahabali's kingdom as a mark of respect for his virtues.

Keralam (Chera-nadu) is prominently referenced in the Tamil Epic Cilappatikaram. The Heroine Kannagi after suffering innumerable injustices travels over the hills to Keralam, where the Gods and Goddesses receive her and take her to heaven. The deity at the Kodungallur Bhagavathy Temple is worshipped as Kannagi Amma.

Another legend, from the 17th century Malayalam work Keralolpathi, tells that the lands of Keralam were recovered from the sea by the axe-wielding warrior-sage Parashurama, the sixth avatar of the deity Vishnu (hence, Keralam is also called Parashurama Kshetram; 'The Land of Parashurama'). According to legend, Parashurama threw his axe across the sea, and the water receded as far as it reached. This new area of land extended from Gokarna to Kanyakumari. The land which rose from sea was filled with salt and was unsuitable for habitation; so Parashurama invoked the snake-king Vasuki, who spat the holy poison and converted the soil into fertile lush green land. Out of respect, Vasuki and all snakes were appointed as protectors and guardians of the land.

== New Zealand ==
The earliest recorded use of the phrase as applied to New Zealand was as the title of a poem about New Zealand written by Thomas Bracken. It was published in a book of his poems in 1890, and again in 1893 in a book entitled Lays and Lyrics: God's Own Country and Other Poems. God's Own Country as a phrase was often used and popularised by New Zealand's longest serving prime minister, Richard John Seddon. He last quoted it on 10 June 1906 when he sent a telegram to the Victorian premier, Thomas Bent, the day before leaving Sydney to return home to New Zealand. "Just leaving for God's own country," he wrote. He never made it, dying the next day on the ship Oswestry Grange. Bracken's God's Own Country is less well known internationally than God Defend New Zealand, which he published in 1876. The latter poem, set to music by John Joseph Woods, was declared the country's national hymn in 1940, and made the second national anthem of New Zealand along with God Save the Queen in 1977.

In recent times, the form Godzone on its own has been used informally of New Zealand.

== United States ==
The phrase was also sporadically used to describe several American regions. Most known is the Upper Peninsula of Michigan. It is currently used to describe South Boston. It was also used by the Confederate army to describe parts of Tennessee in the 1860s. The phrase was also used to describe California in the 1860s, and by Clement Laird Vallandigham to describe the land of the Mississippi plains. None of these remain widely used to describe a region, though it is still occasionally used to describe the United States overall.

During World War II, German Nazi propaganda minister Joseph Goebbels sarcastically mocked the US as "Aus Gottes eigenem Land" (From God's Own Country) in an essay that appeared in the German newspaper Das Reich on 9 August 1942. Goebbels ridiculed the United States as a young land that lacked culture, education and history in contrast with Germany. In 1943, the Nazis published an anti-American, antisemitic propaganda book written by Erwin Berghaus called "USA – nackt!: Bilddokumente aus Gottes eigenem Land" ("USA naked! Photo documents from God's own country") which also mockingly characterized the US with the phrase. Several modern German newspapers such as Die Welt, Der Tagesspiegel and Die Zeit, have also used the phrase "Gottes eigenes Land" ("God's own country") to criticize American culture and society.

== Zimbabwe ==
The phrase "God's own country" was heard during the 1970s in Zimbabwe (formerly Rhodesia, Southern Rhodesia), where most people perceived the land as beautiful despite the ongoing Bush War of the time. Evidence of the phrase being used earlier in reference to Rhodesia is found in Chartered Millions: Rhodesia and the Challenge to the British Commonwealth by John Hobbis Harris, published 1920 by Swarthmore Press (refer to page 27). The phrase "Godzone" is distinctly different and was not used in Rhodesia.
