= Clive Matthewson =

New Zealand politician

The Honourable Clive Matthewson MNZM

1st Leader of United New Zealand
- In office 28 June 1995 – 13 December 1996
- Succeeded by: Peter Dunne

8th Minister of State Services
- In office 9 February 1990 – 2 November 1990
- Prime Minister: Geoffrey Palmer; Mike Moore
- Preceded by: Stan Rodger
- Succeeded by: Bill Birch

Member of the New Zealand Parliament for Dunedin West
- In office 14 July 1984 – 12 October 1996
- Preceded by: Constituency created
- Succeeded by: Constituency abolished

Personal details
- Born: 1944 (age 81–82) Wellington, New Zealand
- Party: Labour
- Other political affiliations: United New Zealand
- Children: 5
- Relatives: Katherine Rich (niece)
- Occupation: Civil Engineer

Clive Denby Matthewson MNZM (born 1944) is a New Zealand civil engineer and former politician.

== Biography ==
=== Early life and career ===
Matthewson was born in Wellington in 1944. He was educated at Waitaki Boys' High School and University of Canterbury. He has a PhD in Civil Engineering which he completed in 1970. The title of his PhD thesis was: "The elastic behaviour of a laterally loaded pile". He worked as a civil engineer until he was elected to parliament in 1984.

=== Political career ===
New Zealand Parliament
Years	Term	Electorate	Party
1984–1987	41st	Dunedin West	Labour
1987–1990	42nd	Dunedin West	Labour
1990–1993	43rd	Dunedin West	Labour
1993–1995	44th	Dunedin West	Labour
1995–1996	Changed allegiance to:		United NZ

He was chairman of the Wanganui electorate for the Labour Party and also a member of Labour's governing body the New Zealand Council. In 1977, he sought the Labour nomination for the Christchurch electorate of Papanui, but was beaten by former Eden MP Mike Moore. Two years later he stood for the Labour candidacy for the Christchurch Central seat in a by-election, but was again unsuccessful. Matthewson then unsuccessfully contested the Clutha electorate in the 1981 election for the Labour Party.

In the 1983 electoral redistribution, the number of Dunedin electorates was reduced from three to two. Brian MacDonell, who had since 1963 represented Dunedin Central, was supposed to represent the new Dunedin West electorate. However, Labour's president, Jim Anderton, presided over MacDonell's de-selection and installed his personal friend Matthewson instead. Matthewson was elected to Dunedin West in 1984. Matthewson was considered one of the most effective backbenchers in the Fourth Labour Government. In August 1989, he was appointed by Prime Minister Geoffrey Palmer as Under-Secretary to the Minister of Health and Labour.

In February 1990, he was elected to cabinet and was appointed by Palmer as Minister of State Services, Minister of Science, Minister in charge of the Audit Department and Associate Minister of State Owned Enterprises, Energy, Commerce and Labour.

After the government was defeated he was appointed Shadow Minister of Social Security and State Services by Labour leader Mike Moore in 1991. He left Labour in 1995 to jointly establish the United New Zealand party with six other sitting MPs. Matthewson became United's leader, and when the party formed a coalition with the governing National Party in 1996 he was made a Cabinet Minister. In the 1996 election, Peter Dunne was the only United politician to keep his seat, and Matthewson, who had contested the new Dunedin South electorate, did not return to Parliament.

In the 1998 New Year Honours, he was appointed a Member of the New Zealand Order of Merit, for public services as a Member of Parliament.

At the 1998 local-body elections Matthewson ran for the position of Mayor of Dunedin, but was defeated by incumbent Sukhi Turner.

=== Post-politics ===
He was the Director of Development and Alumni Relations at the University of Otago from 2002 to 2008, and between 23 July 2004 and 30 September 2008 was on the board of directors for the New Zealand Railways Corporation.

== Personal life ==
Matthewson is married with five children. Katherine Rich, a former National Party MP, is his niece.

== Notes ==
Political offices
Preceded by Stan Rodger	Minister of State Services; 1990	Succeeded by Bill Birch
New Zealand Parliament
New constituency	Member of Parliament for Dunedin West; 1984–1996	Constituency abolished
