= Dunedin Central =

Dunedin Central was a parliamentary electorate in the city of Dunedin in Otago, New Zealand from 1881 to 1890 and 1905 to 1984.

== Population centres ==
The previous electoral redistribution was undertaken in 1875 for the 1875–1876 election. In the six years since, New Zealand's European population had increased by 65%. In the 1881 electoral redistribution, the House of Representatives increased the number of European representatives to 91 (up from 84 since the 1875–1876 election). The number of Māori electorates was held at four. The House further decided that electorates should not have more than one representative, which led to 35 new electorates being formed, including Dunedin Central, and two electorates that had previously been abolished to be recreated. This necessitated a major disruption to existing boundaries.

== History ==
Thomas Bracken, who at the 1879 election had unsuccessfully contested the City of Dunedin electorate, was the first representative. At the 1884 election, Bracken was defeated by James Benn Bradshaw, but Bradshaw died during the term (on 1 September 1886) and Bracken won the resulting by-election. He served for the rest of the term and then retired.

The 1887 election was contested by Edward Cargill and Frederick Fitchett, and won by Fitchett. Fitchett served one term and then retired. The electorate was abolished at the end of the term in 1890.

When the electorate was recreated for the 1905 election, the election was won by John A. Millar of the Liberal Party, who had represented various Dunedin electorates since 1893. At the next election in 1908, Millar successfully stood in the Dunedin West electorate.

The Dunedin Central electorate was won by James Arnold in that year, who was also of the Liberal Party. At the 1911 election, Arnold was beaten by Charles Statham. Statham was a representative of the Reform Party, but became an independent in 1919. Statham resigned after the 1914 election, after irregularities in the counting of the vote turned a 12-vote lead for his competitor Jim Munro into a 12-vote loss. Munro, who represented the United Labour Party, and Statham contested the resulting 1915 by-election, which was narrowly won by Statham. He continued to represent the electorate until his retirement in 1935.

Peter Neilson of the Labour Party won the 1935 election. He served for three terms before he retired in 1946. He was succeeded by Labour's Phil Connolly in the 1946 election, who served six terms before he retired. Brian MacDonell of the Labour Party won the 1963 election and served seven terms until 1984, when the electorate was abolished. MacDonell then failed to get selected by Labour for the Dunedin West electorate and then stood as an independent, but he was unsuccessful.

=== Members of Parliament ===
The electorate was represented by nine Members of Parliament:

Key

Independent Liberal Liberal–Labour Reform Labour

Election	Winner
1881 election	Thomas Bracken
1884 election	James Benn Bradshaw
1886 by-election	Thomas Bracken (2nd period)
1887 election	Frederick Fitchett
(Electorate abolished 1890–1905)
1905 election	John A. Millar
1908 election	James Arnold
1911 election	Charles Statham
1914 election	Charles Statham
1915 by-election	Charles Statham
1919 election	Charles Statham
1922 election	Charles Statham
1925 election	Charles Statham
1928 election	Charles Statham
1931 election	Charles Statham
1935 election	Peter Neilson
1938 election	Peter Neilson
1943 election	Peter Neilson
1946 election	Phil Connolly
1949 election	Phil Connolly
1951 election	Phil Connolly
1954 election	Phil Connolly
1957 election	Phil Connolly
1960 election	Phil Connolly
1963 election	Brian MacDonell
1966 election	Brian MacDonell
1969 election	Brian MacDonell
1972 election	Brian MacDonell
1975 election	Brian MacDonell
1978 election	Brian MacDonell
1981 election	Brian MacDonell
(Electorate abolished in 1984; see Dunedin West)

== Election results ==
=== 1981 election ===
1981 general election: Dunedin Central
Party	Candidate	Votes	%	±%
Labour	Brian MacDonell	9,662	53.81	+3.60
National	Nancy Ruth King	5,493	30.59	
Social Credit	D A Hood	2,798	15.58	
Majority		4,169	23.22	+4.58
Turnout		17,953	87.04	+22.56
Registered electors		20,626		

=== 1978 election ===
1978 general election: Dunedin Central
Party	Candidate	Votes	%	±%
Labour	Brian MacDonell	9,193	50.21	+3.82
National	Michael Ablett	5,780	31.57	
Social Credit	C Howard	2,649	14.46	
Values	Kathleen Dawson	685	3.74	−3.77
Majority		3,413	18.64	+10.71
Turnout		18,307	64.48	−16.30
Registered electors		28,391		

=== 1975 election ===
1975 general election: Dunedin Central
Party	Candidate	Votes	%	±%
Labour	Brian MacDonell	8,352	46.39	−11.26
National	Ian Bright	6,924	38.46	
Values	Kathleen Dawson	1,353	7.51	
Social Credit	Zorina Vujcich	1,327	7.37	
Socialist Unity	John Lindsay	32	0.17	
Independent	H Smith	13	0.07	
Majority		1,428	7.93	−15.25
Turnout		18,001	80.78	−6.93
Registered electors		22,282		

=== 1972 election ===
1972 general election: Dunedin Central
Party	Candidate	Votes	%	±%
Labour	Brian MacDonell	9,378	57.65	+1.77
National	Fred O'Neill	5,607	34.46	
Social Credit	Colin Aberdeen	1,058	6.50	−2.35
New Democratic	Christopher John Murphy	119	0.73	
Socialist Unity	Jack Marston	105	0.64	
Majority		3,771	23.18	+0.11
Turnout		16,267	87.71	+0.35
Registered electors		18,545		

=== 1969 election ===
1969 general election: Dunedin Central
Party	Candidate	Votes	%	±%
Labour	Brian MacDonell	9,565	55.88	+7.31
National	Margaret Mary Reichwein	5,616	32.81	
Social Credit	Colin Aberdeen	1,515	8.85	−1.99
Phoenix Party	Gerald Williams	418	2.44	
Majority		3,949	23.07	+15.07
Turnout		17,114	88.06	+1.54
Registered electors		19,433		

=== 1966 election ===
1966 general election: Dunedin Central
Party	Candidate	Votes	%	±%
Labour	Brian MacDonell	7,557	48.57	−0.07
National	John Farry	6,312	40.57	
Social Credit	Colin Aberdeen	1,687	10.84	+1.30
Majority		1,245	8.00	+0.55
Turnout		15,556	86.52	−2.68
Registered electors		17,979		

=== 1963 election ===
1963 general election: Dunedin Central
Party	Candidate	Votes	%	±%
Labour	Brian MacDonell	7,639	48.64	
National	George Robert Thorn	6,469	41.19	
Social Credit	Colin Aberdeen	1,499	9.54	+3.18
Communist	John Leslie Marston	96	0.61	
Majority		1,170	7.45	
Turnout		15,703	89.20	−0.12
Registered electors		17,604		

=== 1960 election ===
1960 general election: Dunedin Central
Party	Candidate	Votes	%	±%
Labour	Phil Connolly	7,175	48.05	−4.93
National	Norman Scurr	6,333	42.41	
Social Credit	Colin Aberdeen	951	6.36	
Independent	Warrington Taylor	471	3.15	
Majority		842	5.63	−5.80
Turnout		14,930	89.32	−2.79
Registered electors		16,715		

=== 1957 election ===
1957 general election: Dunedin Central
Party	Candidate	Votes	%	±%
Labour	Phil Connolly	8,241	52.98	+10.32
National	Marcus Anderson	6,463	41.55	−1.33
Social Credit	Mary King	850	5.46	−11.65
Majority		1,778	11.43	+9.00
Turnout		15,554	92.11	+0.52
Registered electors		16,885		

=== 1954 election ===
1954 general election: Dunedin Central
Party	Candidate	Votes	%	±%
Labour	Phil Connolly	5,784	42.66	−9.24
National	Marcus Anderson	5,454	40.22	
Social Credit	Mary King	2,320	17.11	
Majority		330	2.43	−0.63
Turnout		13,558	91.59	+1.34
Registered electors		14,802		

=== 1951 election ===
1951 general election: Dunedin Central
Party	Candidate	Votes	%	±%
Labour	Phil Connolly	6,321	51.90	−2.01
National	Walter MacDougall	5,858	48.09	
Majority		373	3.06	−4.76
Turnout		12,179	90.25	−3.17
Registered electors		13,494		

=== 1949 election ===
1949 general election: Dunedin Central
Party	Candidate	Votes	%	±%
Labour	Phil Connolly	6,813	53.91	−3.62
National	David Murdoch	5,824	46.08	
Majority		989	7.82	−7.25
Turnout		12,637	93.42	+0.32
Registered electors		13,527		

=== 1946 election ===
1946 general election: Dunedin Central
Party	Candidate	Votes	%	±%
Labour	Phil Connolly	7,633	57.53	
National	Stuart Sidey	5,633	42.46	
Majority		2,000	15.07	
Turnout		13,266	93.56	+3.06
Registered electors		14,179		

=== 1943 election ===
1943 general election: Dunedin Central
Party	Candidate	Votes	%	±%
Labour	Peter Neilson	7,853	54.54	+8.25
National	Leonard James Tobin Ireland	5,698	39.58	
Democratic Labour	A P Peat	686	4.76	
Informal votes		159	1.10	+0.36
Majority		2,155	14.96	−11.37
Turnout		14,396	90.50	−2.64
Registered electors		15,907		

=== 1938 election ===
1938 general election: Dunedin Central
Party	Candidate	Votes	%	±%
Labour	Peter Neilson	9,094	62.79	+7.40
National	William John Meade	5,280	36.45	
Informal votes		108	0.74	+0.13
Majority		3,814	26.33	+11.67
Turnout		14,482	93.14	+2.21
Registered electors		15,548		

=== 1935 election ===
1935 general election: Dunedin Central
Party	Candidate	Votes	%	±%
Labour	Peter Neilson	6,529	55.39	+6.64
Reform	Donald Cameron	4,800	40.72	
Independent	Sidney Wren	457	3.87	
Informal votes		73	0.61	+0.41
Majority		1,729	14.66	
Turnout		11,786	90.93	+5.14
Registered electors		12,961		

=== 1931 election ===
1931 general election: Dunedin Central
Party	Candidate	Votes	%	±%
Independent	Charles Statham	5,389	51.25	
Labour	Peter Neilson	5,127	48.75	
Majority		262	2.49	
Informal votes		21	0.20	
Turnout		10,537	85.79	
Registered electors		12,283		

=== 1928 election ===
1928 general election: Dunedin Central
Party	Candidate	Votes	%	±%
Independent	Charles Statham	6,022	58.62	
Labour	John Robinson	4,251	41.38	
Majority		1,771	17.24	
Informal votes		117	1.13	
Turnout		10,390	88.11	
Registered electors		11,792		

=== 1915 by-election ===
1915 Dunedin Central by-election
Party	Candidate	Votes	%	±%
Reform	Charles Statham	4,033	50.67	+0.59
United Labour	Jim Munro	3,926	49.33	−0.62
Informal votes		11	0.13	−2.53
Majority		107	1.34	+1.18
Turnout		7,959	84.55	+2.97
Registered electors		9,413		

=== 1914 election ===
1914 general election: Dunedin Central
Party	Candidate	Votes	%	±%
Reform	Charles Statham	3,744	50.08	
United Labour	Jim Munro	3,732	49.91	
Informal votes		199	2.66	
Majority		12	0.16	
Turnout		7,476	81.51	
Registered electors		9,171		

=== 1886 by-election ===
1886 Dunedin Central by-election
Party	Candidate	Votes	%	±%
Independent	Thomas Bracken	501	59.71	
Independent	William Hutchison	255	30.39	
Independent	Charles Robert Chapman	80	9.54	
Independent	William Darling	3	0.36	
Majority		246	29.32	
Informal votes		8		
Turnout		847		
