= May Don =

New Zealand inspector, activist and welfare worker (1898–1965)

Frances May Don (24 October 1898 – 22 July 1965) was a New Zealand factory inspector, political activist, and welfare worker. She was born in Dunedin, New Zealand on 24 October 1898.

Don began her career in politics at the beginning of the 1930s as a member of the New Zealand Labour Party in South Dunedin. In 1936, she worked as a factory inspector out of Wellington, and went on to become a permanent member of the Department of Labour. While in Wellington, Don was also an active member in the Elizabeth McCombs Club, which encouraged women to actively participate in public life and the public sector. Additionally, Don was an active member of the National Council of Women of New Zealand, and in the 1940s, she focused on increasing wages for women in order to lessen the gender wage gap.

Frances May Don continued to be an active member of the National Council of Women of New Zealand until 1960, and died in 1965 of breast cancer.
