= Edwin Thoms Cox =

New Zealand politician (1881-1967)

The Reverend Edwin Thoms Cox
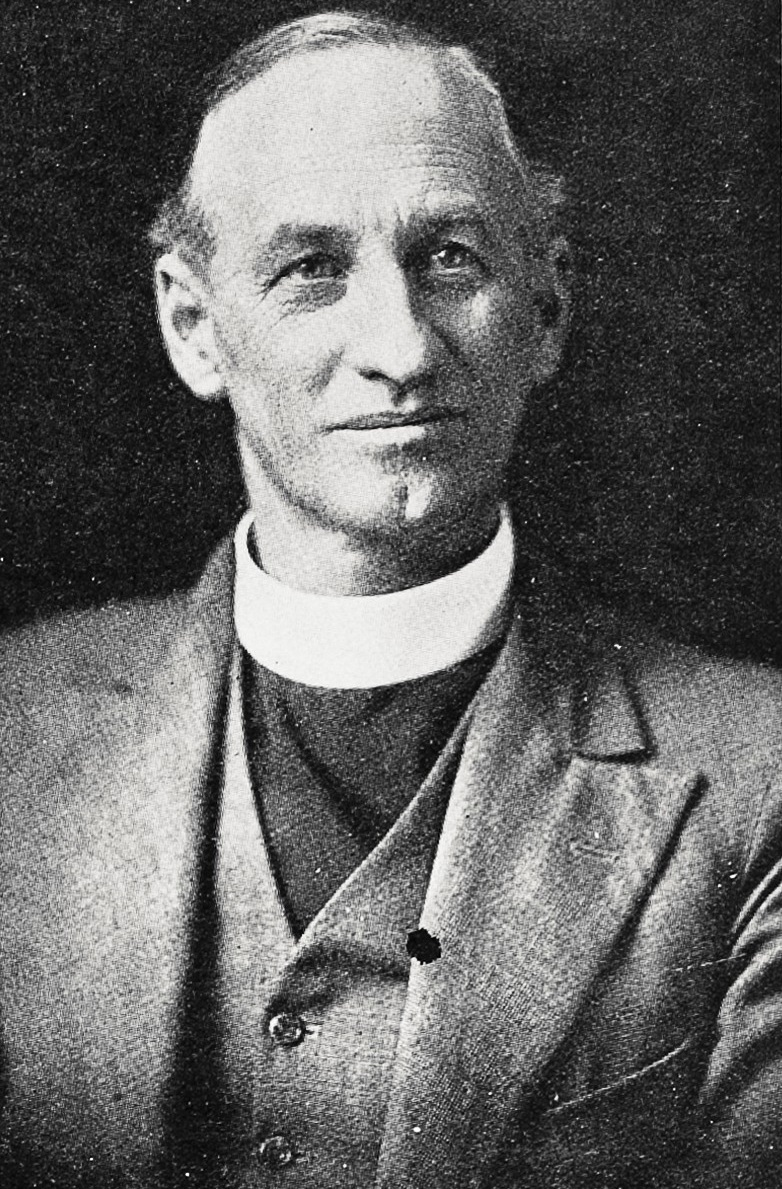

46th Mayor of Dunedin
- In office 4 May 1933 – 11 May 1938
- Preceded by: Robert Black
- Succeeded by: Andrew Allen

Personal details
- Born: 9 January 1881 Marton, New Zealand
- Died: 18 December 1967 (aged 86) Adelaide, Australia
- Party: Labour
- Spouse: Winifred Mary Hudson
- Occupation: clergyman, politician

Edwin Thoms (or Thomas) Cox (9 January 1881 – 18 December 1967) was a New Zealand politician and Mayor of Dunedin. He was Dunedin's first Labour mayor. He had been a Methodist minister.

== Biography ==
He was born in Marton, and was educated at Prince Albert College, Auckland, the University of Auckland and the Victoria University of Wellington from which he graduated in 1915 with first class honours in history.

A Methodist minister since 1916, he was Superintendent of the Auckland Central Mission for six years, then minister of the Central Church, Wanganui for eight years before moving to the Mornington Methodist Church, Dunedin in 1932.

In 1933 he successfully stood for the mayoralty of Dunedin as an independent with Labour backing. In 1935 he stood on the Labour ticket both for the mayoralty, and unsuccessfully for Clutha in the 1935 election. His programme for Dunedin included work for the unemployed and for adequate housing for all citizens, although not all his proposals were accepted by the Council. In 1938 he again stood for mayor and was defeated, partly as no previous Dunedin mayor had stood three times. The opposition Citizens Association and the Otago Daily Times attacked him in a vitriolic campaign, with references to "municipal sovietism". After losing the Mayoralty Cox unsuccessfully stood for the Labour nomination in the electorate of Dunedin West, but lost to Phil Connolly. He proceeded to instead contest the Taranaki seat of Egmont in the 1943 election.

While Mayor and after his defeat he worked as a land agent. In 1967 Cox and his wife Winifred (who he had married in 1912) moved to Adelaide, where he died in December.

Political offices
Preceded by Robert Black	Mayor of Dunedin; 1933–1938	Succeeded by Andrew Allen
