= Thomas Bracken =

New Zealand poet, journalist and politician

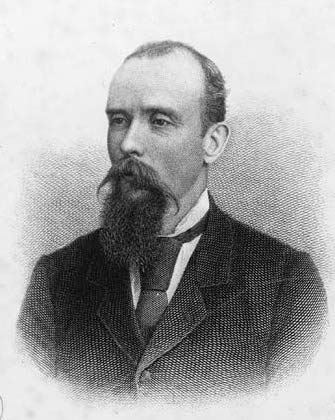
- Born: c. December 1843; Clonee, County Meath, Ireland
- Died: 16 February 1898 (aged 54); Dunedin, New Zealand
- Citizenship: Irish-New Zealand
- Occupations: Poet, journalist, politician
- Spouse: Helen Hester Copley
- Children: Charles Copley Bracken
- Writing career
- Notable work: God Defend New Zealand

Thomas Bracken (c. December 1843 – 16 February 1898) was an Irish-born New Zealand poet, journalist and politician. He wrote "God Defend New Zealand", one of the two national anthems of New Zealand, and was the first person to publish the phrase "God's Own Country" as applied to New Zealand. He also won the Otago Caledonian Society's prize for poetry.

His mother Margaret died in 1846 and his father Thomas in 1852. He was sent to Australia at the age of 12 to join his uncle, John Kiernan, at Geelong, Victoria.

Bracken was apprenticed to a pharmacist in Bendigo, later moved around to work on farms as a shearer and drover, and for a time was a gold fossicker and store keeper. At that time he began writing tales over the activities of the diggers involved in the goldrush, and about stock men and sheep men. He also established Thomas Bracken and Co with Alexander Bathgate to buy and operate the Evening Herald until it was superseded in 1890 by the liberal Globe.

== Literary career ==
In early 1869, at the age of 25, Bracken moved to Dunedin in New Zealand, where a volume containing a selection of poems he had written in Australia was published. While working as a shearer and at various odd jobs, he carried on writing, and published a small book of verses, Flights among the Flax. This was noticed in literary circles, and he won the Otago Caledonian Society's prize for poetry.

Determined to enter journalism, Bracken took a staff position on the Otago Guardian. While at the Guardian he met John Bathgate who soon after, in 1875, established the Saturday Advertiser "to foster a national spirit in New Zealand and encourage colonial literature". Bracken also wrote for the Morning Herald and the Catholic The New Zealand Tablet. He was born into a Catholic family, but lapsed, and was a freethinker and a freemason.

Bracken became editor and immediately began to encourage local writers; the Advertiser's circulation reached 7,000 copies which was a notable achievement for that era. Encouraged by this literary and commercial success, Bracken contributed some of his own satire, humour and verse, including God Defend New Zealand, published in 1876, which became the national anthem. He wrote Not Understood in 1879, the title poem later becoming internationally known through recitations by English actor and entertainer Mel B. Spurr.

Although he often used the pseudonyms Paddy Murphy and Didymus, the prolific works under his own name soon became published worldwide and he became famous throughout Australia and New Zealand. Later publications of his works in bound editions included Flowers of the Freeland, Behind the Tomb and Other Poems (1871), The Land of the Maori and the Moa (or Lays of the Land of the Maori and Moa), Musings in Maoriland and Lays and Lyrics: God's Own Country and Other Poems (1893).

A supporter of the egalitarian policies of Governor Sir George Grey, Bracken championed sovereignty for the native Māori people, and later criticised the government for what he saw to be breaches of its obligations to the Treaty of Waitangi.

He had arrived in New Zealand when colonial troops were engaged in war with Te Kooti, who went into battle under his own distinctive flag. It had three symbols that some claim were meant to signify stars. Bracken's national anthem asks God to "guard Pacific's triple star", and some historians have reasoned that refers to Te Kooti's flag and is his oblique support for Māori. It has also been suggested that "Pacific's triple star" simply means the three main islands of New Zealand – Northern, Middle and Stewart as they were referred to at that time. Bracken never explained what he meant, so there is no definitive clarification today. (There have been suggestions that Bracken was referring to Alpha Centauri, the very bright triple star in the Milky Way, visible only in the Southern Hemisphere. That is impossible because Proxima Centauri, the third star in Alpha Centauri, was not discovered until 1915, some 39 years after Bracken wrote his anthem.)

== Political career ==
New Zealand Parliament
Years	Term	Electorate	List	Party
1881–1884	8th	Dunedin Central		Independent
1886–1887	9th	Dunedin Central		Independent

Vitally interested in current events and politics, Bracken stood for Parliament in the City of Dunedin electorate in the 1879 election. He was unsuccessful at that time.

Bracken won the Dunedin Central electorate at the 1881 election. He lost the seat by three votes to James Bradshaw at the 1884 election, but when Bradshaw died in 1886, he won the 1886 by-election and resumed his seat until the end of the term in 1887, when he retired.

Bracken was not a prudent person and eventually became financially embarrassed. He became a bill reader in Parliament in May 1894, but was forced to leave Wellington and return to Dunedin when his health deteriorated.

== Death ==
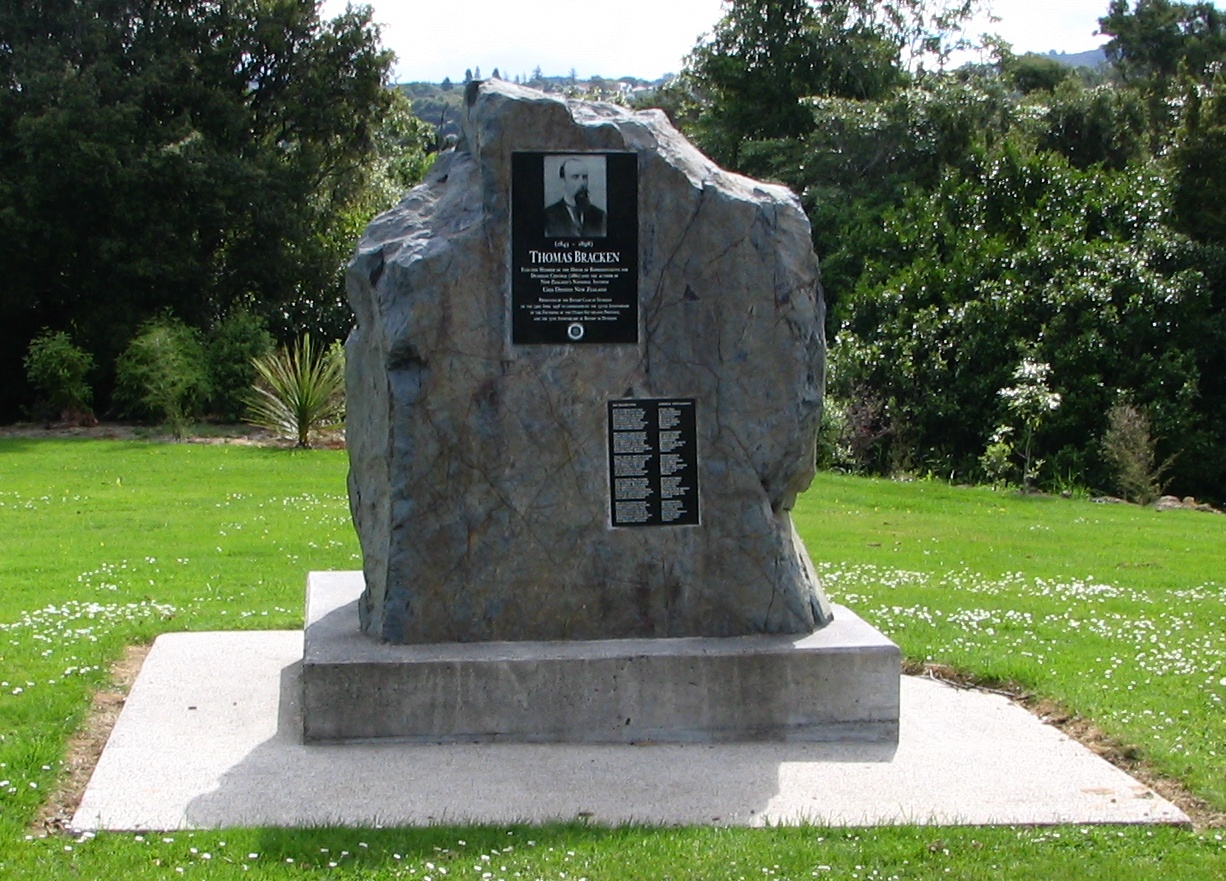
Memorial to Thomas Bracken at Dunedin's Northern Cemetery

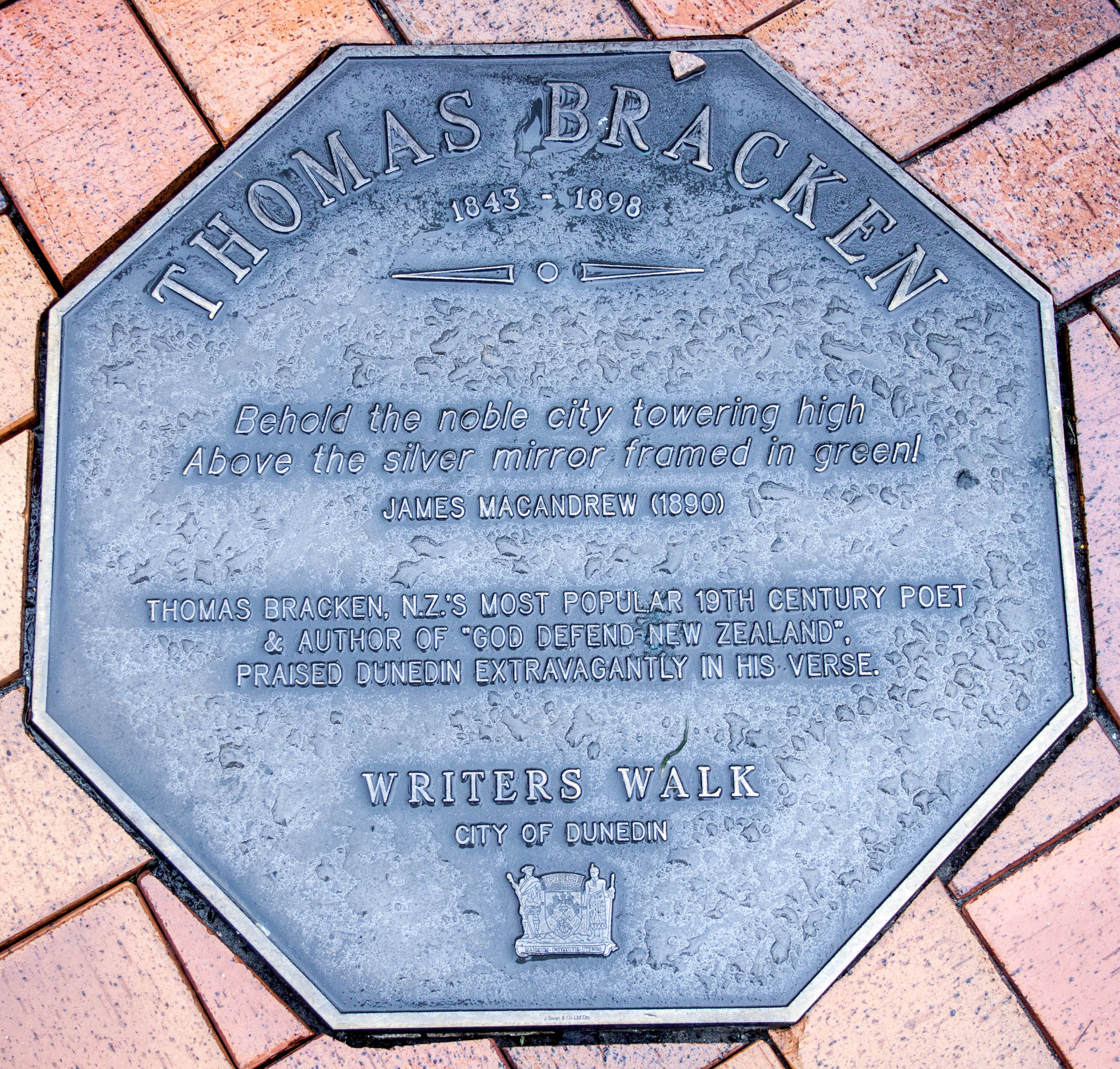
Memorial plaque dedicated to Thomas Bracken in Dunedin, on the Writers' Walk on the Octagon

Bracken died on the night of 16 February 1898, and is buried in the Dunedin Northern Cemetery. A lookout nearby, with views across the city, is named in his honour.

== See also ==
- New Zealand literature

New Zealand Parliament
New constituency	Member for Dunedin Central; 1881–1884	Succeeded by James Bradshaw
Preceded by James Bradshaw	Member for Dunedin Central; 1886–1887	Succeeded by Frederick Fitchett
