= Charles Statham =

New Zealand politician

The Honourable Sir Charles Statham
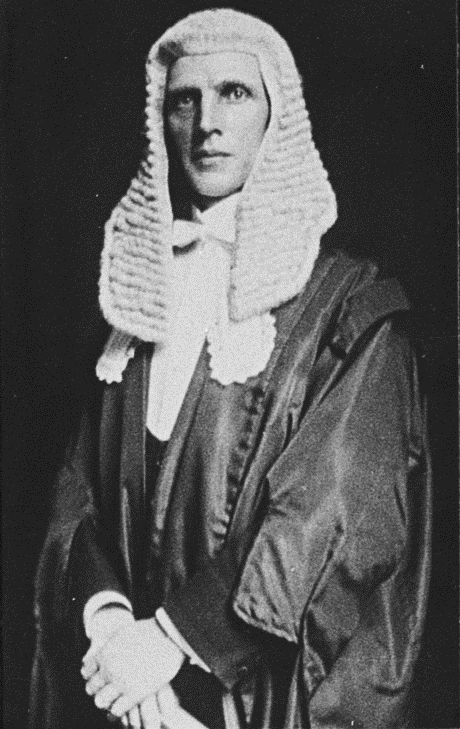

9th Speaker of the House of Representatives
- In office 7 February 1923 – 1 November 1935
- Preceded by: Frederic Lang
- Succeeded by: Bill Barnard

Personal details
- Born: 10 May 1875 Dunedin, New Zealand
- Died: 5 March 1946 (aged 70) Wellington, New Zealand
- Party: Reform

Sir Charles Ernest Statham (10 May 1875 – 5 March 1946) was a New Zealand politician, and the ninth Speaker of the House of Representatives, from 1923 to 1935.

== Private life ==
He was born in Dunedin in 1875, and trained in law, practising in his own Dunedin office from 1904. He married the part-Māori Lilias Harata te Aho Burnett of Dunedin in 1905, with whom he later had one daughter.

== Political career ==
New Zealand Parliament
Years	Term	Electorate	Party
1911–1914	18th	Dunedin Central	Reform
1914–1915	19th	Dunedin Central	Reform
1915–1919	19th	Dunedin Central	Reform
1919–1922	20th	Dunedin Central	Independent
1922–1925	21st	Dunedin Central	Independent
1925–1928	22nd	Dunedin Central	Independent
1928–1931	23rd	Dunedin Central	Independent
1931–1935	24th	Dunedin Central	Independent

He was on the Dunedin City Council 1911–1915. He was the Reform Party candidate in 1911 in the Dunedin Central electorate and defeated the incumbent, James Arnold of the Liberal Party. Statham held the electorate from 1911 to 1935. He had differences with the Reform party leadership, and was returned as an independent member in 1919. He represented a city and working-class electorate, and his majority was gradually reduced by the Labour Party. He decided to retire at the 1935 election.

He was Speaker of the House of Representatives from 1923 to 1935. He is one of only three people to have held the office despite not being from the governing party. In 1923, as an independent, but formerly a member of the Reform Party, he was backed by Reform so as not to endanger the party's slim majority, and later retained his position under the United Party. He was described as "probably the greatest speaker the house has known" and many of his rulings still form part of the parliamentary standing orders today. He was fair but firm during a stormy period. His retirement was due to the rising popularity of the Labour Party, and he did not think that he could contest the 1935 election without losing his impartiality, but fighting the election along party-lines would compromise his ability to remain Speaker.

He was created a Knight Bachelor in the 1926 King's Birthday Honours, and in 1935, he was awarded the King George V Silver Jubilee Medal. He was appointed to the New Zealand Legislative Council on 9 March 1936 and was reappointed seven years later after his term had expired and served until his death. He did not take an active part in politics as a Legislative Councillor, though. He practised law in Wellington after retiring from Parliament, and died there on 5 March 1946. He was survived by his wife and his daughter.

== Notes ==
Political offices
Preceded by Frederic Lang	Speaker of the New Zealand House of Representatives; 1923–1935	Succeeded by Bill Barnard
New Zealand Parliament
Preceded by James Arnold	Member of Parliament for Dunedin Central; 1911–1935	Succeeded by Peter Neilson
