= Haerehuka =

New Zealand tribal leader, warrior and orator

Haerehuka (1835–1865) was a New Zealand tribal leader, warrior and orator.
