= Robert Holt Carpenter =

Robert Holt Carpenter (circa 1820 – 24 February 1891) was a New Zealand bookbinder, local politician, bookseller and character. He was born in London, England in circa 1820. He was a member of the Wellington Provincial Council (1856–1861, 1864–1865), and later a councillor for Wellington City Council.
