= Robert Black (mayor) =

New Zealand politician

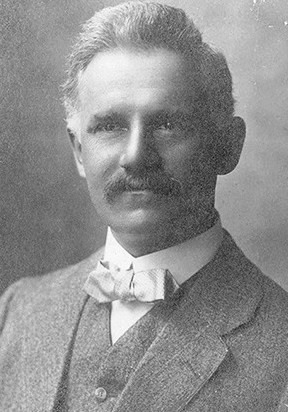

45th Mayor of Dunedin
- In office 1929–1933
- Preceded by: William Taverner
- Succeeded by: Edwin Cox

Personal details
- Born: 1868 Liverpool, England
- Died: 4 January 1939 (aged 70–71) Dunedin, New Zealand
- Party: United
- Spouse: Helen Black

Robert Sheriff Black (1868 – 4 January 1939) was Mayor of Dunedin from 1929 to 1933.

== Biography ==
Black was born in Liverpool in 1868 and migrated to Melbourne in Victoria, Australia. He came to New Zealand in 1897, where he entered the trade of exporting rabbit skins. In 1924, he married Helen Black, who was 30 years his junior. Black already had adult sons who were his wife's age, and together they had a further two sons and two daughters.

He first stood for the Dunedin mayoralty in 1919, but was beaten by William Begg. He won election in 1929 and served for two terms until the 1933 election, when he was beaten by Edwin Thomas Cox. He stood in the 1931 election in the Dunedin North electorate as an independent candidate in support of the United Party, but withdrew shortly before the election, too late for his name to be removed from the ballot.

He died in Dunedin on 4 January 1939.

Political offices
Preceded by William Taverner	Mayor of Dunedin; 1929–1933	Succeeded by Edwin Thoms Cox
