= Gervan McMillan =

New Zealand politician

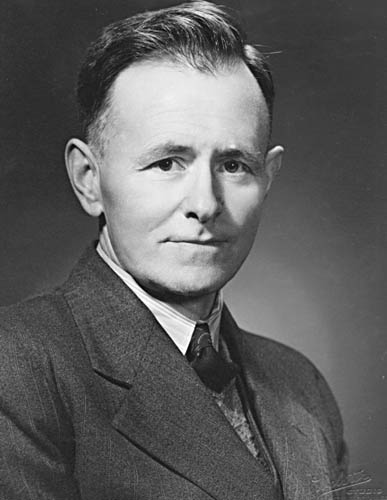
Dr. Gervan McMillan

David Gervan McMillan (26 February 1904 – 20 February 1951) was a New Zealand politician of the Labour Party, and a medical practitioner.

== Biography ==
New Zealand Parliament
Years	Term	Electorate	Party
1935–1938	25th	Dunedin West	Labour
1938–1943	26th	Dunedin West	Labour

McMillan was born in 1904 in New Plymouth, the eldest child of Annie Gertrude Pearce and David McMillan, a dairy farmer near Stratford. He received his secondary education at Stratford Technical High School, where he was dux. With the help of the Taranaki Scholarship, he could afford to study medicine at the University of Otago, from where he graduated MB ChB in 1929. He was a medical practitioner, first practising in Kurow (1929–34) and then at 115 Highgate in Kaikorai, Dunedin (c.1935-36, after which the building was his electorate office to 1943, then again a medical practice after he had left parliament). The building was demolished after 1950 to make way for the Stuart Street extension.

McMillan became involved with the Labour Party in 1923. In his view, good health extended beyond good medical support, but included educational, economic, and social factors.

He represented the Dunedin West electorate from 1935 to 1943, when he retired. He was Minister of Marine (1940–1941) in the First Labour Government, and was responsible for much of the social security system introduced by Labour.

In 1940 he ran for the position of Labour Party leader, being nominated by Arnold Nordmeyer, a friend from Kurow and a supporter of John A. Lee. Clyde Carr also ran, but the winner to replace Savage was his deputy, Peter Fraser.

He was a Dunedin City Councillor for 1935–1938, 1938–1941, 1944–1947 and 1950–1951. He twice unsuccessfully stood for the Dunedin mayoralty; he was beaten by Andrew Allen and Donald Charles Cameron in 1941 and 1944, respectively.

McMillan died on 20 February 1951 at Dunedin from a heart disease. He was survived by his wife, Ethel McMillan, and their two sons. Two years after his death, his widow became a Member of Parliament for North Dunedin, also representing the Labour Party.

== Notes ==
Political offices
Preceded by Bob Semple	Minister of Marine; 1940–1941	Succeeded by Bob Semple
Preceded by Len Wright	Deputy Mayor of Dunedin; 1950–1951	Succeeded by Jim Barnes
New Zealand Parliament
Preceded by William Downie Stewart Jr	Member of Parliament for Dunedin West; 1935-1943	Succeeded by Phil Connolly
