= Dunedin West =

Dunedin West was a New Zealand parliamentary electorate, in the city of Dunedin. It existed for three periods between 1881 and 1996 and was represented by seven Members of Parliament.

== Population centres ==
The previous electoral redistribution was undertaken in 1875 for the 1875–1876 election. In the six years since, New Zealand's European population had increased by 65%. In the 1881 electoral redistribution, the House of Representatives increased the number of European representatives to 91 (up from 84 since the 1875–76 election). The number of Māori electorates was held at four. The House further decided that electorates should not have more than one representative, which led to 35 new electorates being formed, including Dunedin West, and two electorates that had previously been abolished to be recreated. This necessitated a major disruption to existing boundaries.

The 1981 census had shown that the North Island had experienced further population growth, and three additional general seats were created through the 1983 electoral redistribution, bringing the total number of electorates to 95. The South Island had, for the first time, experienced a population loss, but its number of general electorates was fixed at 25 since the 1967 electoral redistribution. More of the South Island population was moving to Christchurch, and two electorates were abolished, while two electorates were recreated (including Dunedin West). In the North Island, six electorates were newly created, three electorates were recreated, and six electorates were abolished.

The electorate was urban, and comprised a number of suburbs in the west of Dunedin.

== History ==
The electorate existed in the 19th century from 1881 to 1890. It was represented by:

- Thomas Dick 1881–84 (defeated)
- William Downie Stewart 1884–90 (retired)

The electorate was recreated, from 1908 to 1946. Stewart's son, also called William Downie Stewart, represented the electorate for the Reform Party from 1914 to 1935, when he was defeated by Labour's Gervan McMillan.

In 1984 the electorate was recreated again, until the introduction of MMP in 1996. Clive Matthewson represented the electorate from 1984 to 1996. He left the New Zealand Labour Party in 1995, and was one of the founders of the United New Zealand party.

=== Members of Parliament ===
Dunedin West was represented by seven Members of Parliament.

Key

Independent Liberal Reform Labour United NZ

Election	Winner
1881 election	Thomas Dick
1884 election	William Downie Stewart
1887 election	William Downie Stewart
(Electorate abolished 1890–1908, see City of Dunedin)
1908 election	John A. Millar
1911 election	John A. Millar
1914 election	William Downie Stewart Jr
1919 election	William Downie Stewart Jr
1922 election	William Downie Stewart Jr
1925 election	William Downie Stewart Jr
1928 election	William Downie Stewart Jr
1931 election	William Downie Stewart Jr
1935 election	Gervan McMillan
1938 election	Gervan McMillan
1943 election	Phil Connolly
(Electorate abolished 1946–1984)
1984 election	Clive Matthewson
1987 election	Clive Matthewson
1990 election	Clive Matthewson
1993 election	Clive Matthewson
(Electorate abolished in 1996; see Dunedin South)

== Election results ==
=== 1993 election ===
1993 general election: Dunedin West
Party	Candidate	Votes	%	±%
Labour	Clive Matthewson	9,924	47.55	−1.21
National	Ollie Turner	5,447	26.10	
Alliance	Norman Wood	4,076	19.53	
NZ First	Khalid Ibadulla	923	4.42	
Christian Heritage	John Streekstra	434	2.07	
Natural Law	Martin Jelley	63	0.30	
Majority		4,477	21.45	+12.76
Turnout		20,867	85.14	−0.28
Registered electors		24,508		

=== 1990 election ===
1990 general election: Dunedin West
Party	Candidate	Votes	%	±%
Labour	Clive Matthewson	9,971	48.76	−9.95
National	Ian McMeeking	8,192	40.06	+3.40
Green	Robyn McCurdy	1,098	5.36	
NewLabour	Frank Rudkin	880	4.30	
Social Credit	Sheryl Tomilson	226	1.10	
Democrats	John Begley	82	0.40	
Majority		1,779	8.69	−13.35
Turnout		20,449	84.86	−3.17
Registered electors		24,097		

=== 1987 election ===
1987 general election: Dunedin West
Party	Candidate	Votes	%	±%
Labour	Clive Matthewson	12,108	58.71	+9.21
National	Ian McMeeking	7,561	36.66	
Democrats	Michael Mellon	812	3.93	
Wizard Party	G B Campbell	142	0.68	
Majority		4,547	22.04	−5.43
Turnout		20,623	88.03	−4.60
Registered electors		23,426		

=== 1984 election ===
1984 general election: Dunedin West
Party	Candidate	Votes	%	±%
Labour	Clive Matthewson	10,832	49.50	
National	Derek Russell	4,821	22.03	
Independent Labour	Brian MacDonell	3,638	16.62	
NZ Party	Richard Freeman	1,840	8.40	
Social Credit	David Guise	749	3.42	
Majority		6,011	27.47	
Turnout		21,880	92.63	
Registered electors		23,619		

=== 1943 election ===
1943 general election: Dunedin West
Party	Candidate	Votes	%	±%
Labour	Phil Connolly	7,430	54.56	
National	Alexander Smith Falconer	6,092	44.73	
Majority		1,338	9.82	
Turnout		13,618	88.90	−3.64
Registered electors		15,318		

=== 1938 election ===
1938 general election: Dunedin West
Party	Candidate	Votes	%	±%
Labour	Gervan McMillan	8,452	58.96	+5.87
National	Stuart Sidey	5,813	40.55	
Informal votes		69	0.48	+0.09
Majority		2,369	16.52	+10.34
Turnout		14,334	92.54	+1.40
Registered electors		15,488		

=== 1935 election ===
1935 general election: Dunedin West
Party	Candidate	Votes	%	±%
Labour	Gervan McMillan	5,886	53.09	
Reform	William Downie Stewart Jr	5,200	46.90	−4.83
Informal votes		44	0.39	−0.59
Majority		686	6.18	
Turnout		11,086	91.14	+6.22
Registered electors		12,163		

=== 1931 election ===
1931 general election: Dunedin West
Party	Candidate	Votes	%	±%
Reform	William Downie Stewart Jr	5,016	51.73	
Labour	John Gilchrist	4,092	42.20	
Independent Liberal	John McDonald	588	6.06	
Informal votes		96	0.98	
Majority		924	9.53	
Turnout		9,792	84.92	
Registered electors		11,531		

=== 1928 election ===
1928 general election: Dunedin West
Party	Candidate	Votes	%	±%
Reform	William Downie Stewart Jr	4,600	44.22	
United	Cornelius Machin Moss	3,323	31.94	
Labour	Ralph Harrison	2,480	23.84	
Majority		1,277	12.28	
Informal votes		113	1.07	
Turnout		10,516	87.18	
Registered electors		12,062		
