= Mark Silverstone =

New Zealand politician

Mark Woolf Silverstone (born Marks; December 1880 (Note: Silverstone's year of birth is widely given as 1883. However, he was enrolled in Chicksand Street School in 1890 in Tower Hamlets, London, with a date of birth given as December 1880. Additionally, he was listed as 26 years old when he was naturalised on 12 September 1907.) – 7 September 1951) was a notable Polish-born New Zealand cabinet-maker, socialist, local politician and financier, who co-founded the New Zealand Alliance of Labour.

== Early life ==
He was born in Pułtusk, Poland to Jewish parents, Barnett Silverstone, a tailor, and his wife, Esther Gotshank. His parents fled Poland to London in 1889 due to religious persecution. A socialist, his religious faith declined, and he joined the National Secular Society. On 25 June 1904, he wed Esther Ethel Feld, a fellow socialist and émigré. He became a naturalised citizen of New Zealand in 1907.

== Career ==
Silverstone acted as secretary of the Dunedin branch of the National Peace and Anti-militarist League from 1913, which opposed New Zealand's participation in World War I. However, as a councillor on the Otago Labour Council he sponsored a resolution seeking to safeguard the welfare and interests of demobilised soldiers returning home. In 1936, Silverstone was appointed to the board of directors of the Reserve Bank of New Zealand by Walter Nash, then-Minister of Finance.

At the 1933 local elections he was elected to the Dunedin City Council, standing on the Labour Party ticket. He was a councillor for five years until 1938 when he was defeated.

== Death ==
Mark Woolf Silverstone died at Dunedin, New Zealand on 7 September 1951. He was survived by his wife, two sons and two daughters.
