= Peter Neilson (politician born 1879) =

New Zealand politician (1879–1948)

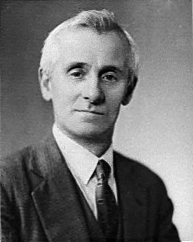
- Neilson in 1935

Member of the New Zealand Parliament for Dunedin Central
- In office 27 November 1935 – 27 November 1946
- Preceded by: Charles Statham
- Succeeded by: Philip Connolly

Personal details
- Born: 1879 Dunedin, New Zealand
- Died: 3 November 1948 (aged 69) Gisborne, New Zealand
- Party: Labour
- Spouse: Mary Dalrymple Laing (1875–1945)
- Occupation: Baker

Peter Neilson (1879 – 3 November 1948) was a New Zealand politician of the Labour Party.

== Biography ==
=== Early life and career ===
He was born in Dunedin in 1879 and was educated locally at George Street Public School. He then became an apprentice baker before gaining employment at a local bakery firm. He was then a business partner of Jim Munro from 1914. When Munro was elected to Parliament in 1922 the partnership was dissolved and Nielson found employment as foreman at another bakery, which he held until 1935. He became a trade union member and was later president of the Dunedin Bakers' Union.

=== Member of Parliament ===
New Zealand Parliament
Years	Term	Electorate	Party
1935–1938	25th	Dunedin Central	Labour
1938–1943	26th	Dunedin Central	Labour
1943–1946	27th	Dunedin Central	Labour

He had been active in the Socialist Party and Social Democratic Party, and had been a member of the Maori Hill Borough Council for four years. He was elected to the Dunedin City Council at the 1935 local-body elections, serving until 1938. Mayor Edwin Thoms Cox appointed Neilson chairman of the council's library committee for the triennium.

Neilson had unsuccessfully stood in the Dunedin Central electorate in the 1931 election. He stood again for Dunedin Central in Labour's landslide win in the 1935 election, holding the seat until 1946 election, when he retired from Parliament for personal reasons. He was succeeded by fellow Labour member and future Minister of Defense Philip Connolly.

=== Later life and death ===
Neilson died on 3 November 1948 at Cook Hospital aged 69 after a three-week illness, survived by his daughter. He was buried at Taruheru Cemetery, Gisborne.

== Notes ==
New Zealand Parliament
Preceded by Charles Statham	Member of Parliament for Dunedin Central; 1935–1946	Succeeded by Philip Connolly
