= Donald Cameron (mayor) =

New Zealand politician (1877–1962)

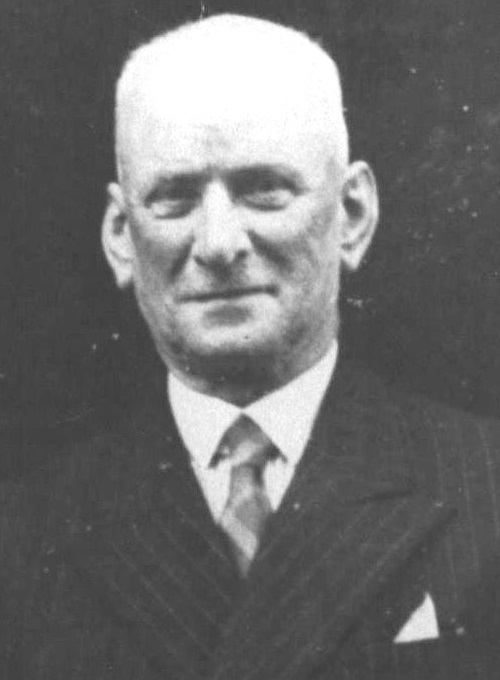
Cameron c. 1944

Sir Donald Charles Cameron (12 May 1877 – 8 October 1962) was a Dunedin businessman and was Mayor of Dunedin from 1944 to 1950. He was knighted in the 1948 Birthday Honours and received the freedom of the City of Edinburgh in 1949.

== Personal life ==
He was born in Dunedin, and married Frances Raines in 1905.

== Career ==
In 44 years with Reid and Gray he rose from office boy to director. He was on the Dunedin City Council since 1935. He was connected with the Methodist Central Mission for 55 years, and was president of the Methodist Conference of New Zealand in 1926. He was president of the Otago Centenary Association in 1948, chairman of the Armed Forces Appeal Board and on the Otago Education Board and Otago University Council.

He stood for parliament for the Reform Party unsuccessfully for Dunedin South in the 1931 election and for Dunedin Central in the 1935 election. Later he stood for parliament unsuccessfully for the National Party in Dunedin North in the 1951 election.

In the 1948 King's Birthday Honours, Cameron was appointed a Knight Bachelor.

Political offices
Preceded by Andrew Allen	Mayor of Dunedin; 1944–1950	Succeeded by Len Wright
