= Phil Connolly =

New Zealand politician

The Honourable Phil Connolly DSC VRD
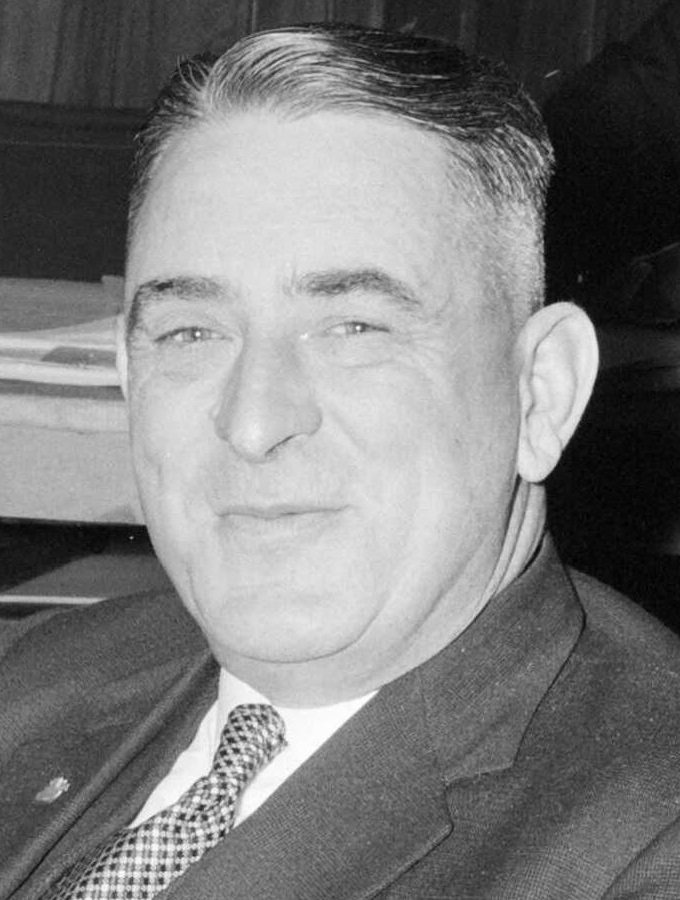
- Connolly in 1958

22nd Minister of Defence
- In office 12 December 1957 – 12 December 1960
- Prime Minister: Walter Nash
- Preceded by: Dean Eyre
- Succeeded by: Dean Eyre

Personal details
- Born: 14 November 1899 Dunedin, New Zealand
- Died: 13 February 1970 (aged 70) Dunedin, New Zealand
- Party: Labour
- Spouse(s): Phyllis Mirfin (1929-1934†); Molly Noton (1943-1970)
- Children: 3
- Profession: Engineer

Military service
- Allegiance: Royal New Zealand Navy
- Years of service: 1939-43
- Rank: Lieutenant commander
- Battles/wars: World War II

Philip George Connolly DSC VRD (14 November 1899 – 13 February 1970) was a New Zealand politician of the Labour Party.

== Early life ==
Connolly was born in Dunedin on 14 November 1899 to Hugh Babbington Connolly and Evelyn Emily Connolly (née Smith). He was educated at McAndrew Road School and Otago Boys' High School until leaving school in 1914 upon the death of his father to work for a living as an apprentice fitter. He also worked for New Zealand Railways Department at the Hillside Workshops. Upon the completion of his apprenticeship he gained employment at the Union Steam Ship Company as a marine engineer. He was later elected a member of the Institute of Marine and Power Engineers union and was chairman of the Hillside branch of the Amalgamated Society of Railway Servants and later its secretary.

== Military career ==
In 1928 he was a foundation member of the Otago Division of the Royal New Zealand Naval Volunteer Reserve and was commissioned as an officer with the rank of Lieutenant. During World War II Connolly served in the Royal New Zealand Navy in both the Atlantic and Pacific, commanding the minesweeper ship HMS Deodar and antisubmarine vessel HMNZS Moa. He was decorated with the Distinguished Service Cross in 1941 for his service in safeguarding Channel convoys.

== Political career ==
New Zealand Parliament
Years	Term	Electorate	Party
1943–1946	27th	Dunedin West	Labour
1946–1949	28th	Dunedin Central	Labour
1949–1951	29th	Dunedin Central	Labour
1951–1954	30th	Dunedin Central	Labour
1954–1957	31st	Dunedin Central	Labour
1957–1960	32nd	Dunedin Central	Labour
1960–1963	33rd	Dunedin Central	Labour

Connolly first developed an interest in politics upon the formation of the Labour Party in 1916. Connolly was a member of the South Dunedin branch of the Labour Party and was a member of the Otago Labour Representation Committee. In 1933 he was elected president of the South Dunedin branch and in 1934 his name was added to the approved list of Parliamentary Labour candidates. He was to become deeply involved in local body politics in Dunedin. He first ran for local office in 1933 unsuccessfully standing for the Dunedin City Council, Otago Harbour Board and Otago Hospital Board. He was likewise unsuccessful at the 1935 and 1938 local-body elections. He was eventually elected a member of the city council in a 1939 by-election. At the 1944 local-body elections he was also elected as a member of the Otago Harbour Board and Otago Hospital Board.

Connolly represented the Dunedin West electorate from 1943 to 1946, and then the Dunedin Central electorate from 1946 to 1963, when he retired. He narrowly missed selection for a cabinet portfolio in 1947 under Peter Fraser, though that year he was elected as the Labour Party's junior whip, being elevated to the senior whip in 1951.

Connolly ran as the Labour candidate for Mayor in 1953, but lost to incumbent Len Wright. Connolly received some respite as despite losing the mayoralty he was comfortably re-elected to the Otago Harbour Board and was appointed to the role of deputy-chairman. In 1953, he was awarded the Queen Elizabeth II Coronation Medal.

Connolly was an agitator against the leadership of Walter Nash during Labour's spell in opposition in the 1950s. He was one of the main instigators of the challenge to Nash in June 1954, which was unsuccessful. As a result, Connolly together with Bill Anderton and Arnold Nordmeyer were called before Labour's National Executive and given warnings about the threat of divisiveness to the party.

He was later appointed a Cabinet Minister by Walter Nash, and was Minister of Defence and from 12 December 1957 to 12 December 1960 in the Second Labour Government. He also was the Minister responsible for Police and War Pensions. He fulfilled an election pledge by government and abolished compulsory military training, despite strenuous opposition from the opposition National Party, the Returned Servicemen's Association and the Chief of the General Staff General Stephen Weir. For a short period in 1959 he was also acting Minister for Social Security where he announced increased welfare payments.

He returned to local-body politics after exiting Parliament. Initially Connolly was set to be Labour's mayoral candidate in Dunedin for the 1962 local-body elections, but was forced to withdraw on grounds of ill-health. Connolly was sure he would have won had he been able to stand, a feeling which was reinforced after his comparatively inexperienced replacement as Labour candidate, councillor Russell Calvert came very close to winning against the incumbent Stuart Sidey. In 1965 he was elected once again to the Otago Harbour Board where he "topped the poll", receiving more votes than any other candidate. In 1968 he was elected to the Dunedin City Council. He served on both bodies until his death.

== Later life ==
In 1970, Connolly was offered a knighthood in the Queen's Birthday Honours list. Before the honour could be conferred, he died suddenly at his Dunedin home, on 13 February 1970, aged 70.

== Notes ==
New Zealand Parliament
Preceded by Gervan McMillan	Member of Parliament for Dunedin West; 1943–1946	Constituency abolished
Preceded by Peter Neilson	Member of Parliament for Dunedin Central; 1946–1963	Succeeded by Brian MacDonell
Political offices
Preceded by Dean Eyre	Minister of Defence; 1957–1960	Succeeded by Dean Eyre
Preceded by Dean Eyre	Minister of Police; 1957–1960	Succeeded by Dean Eyre
Party political offices
Preceded by Robert Macfarlane	Senior Whip of the Labour Party; 1951–1952	Succeeded by Joe Cotterill
