= Andrew Allen (New Zealand politician) =

New Zealand businessman and politician

The Honourable Andrew Allen CBE JP
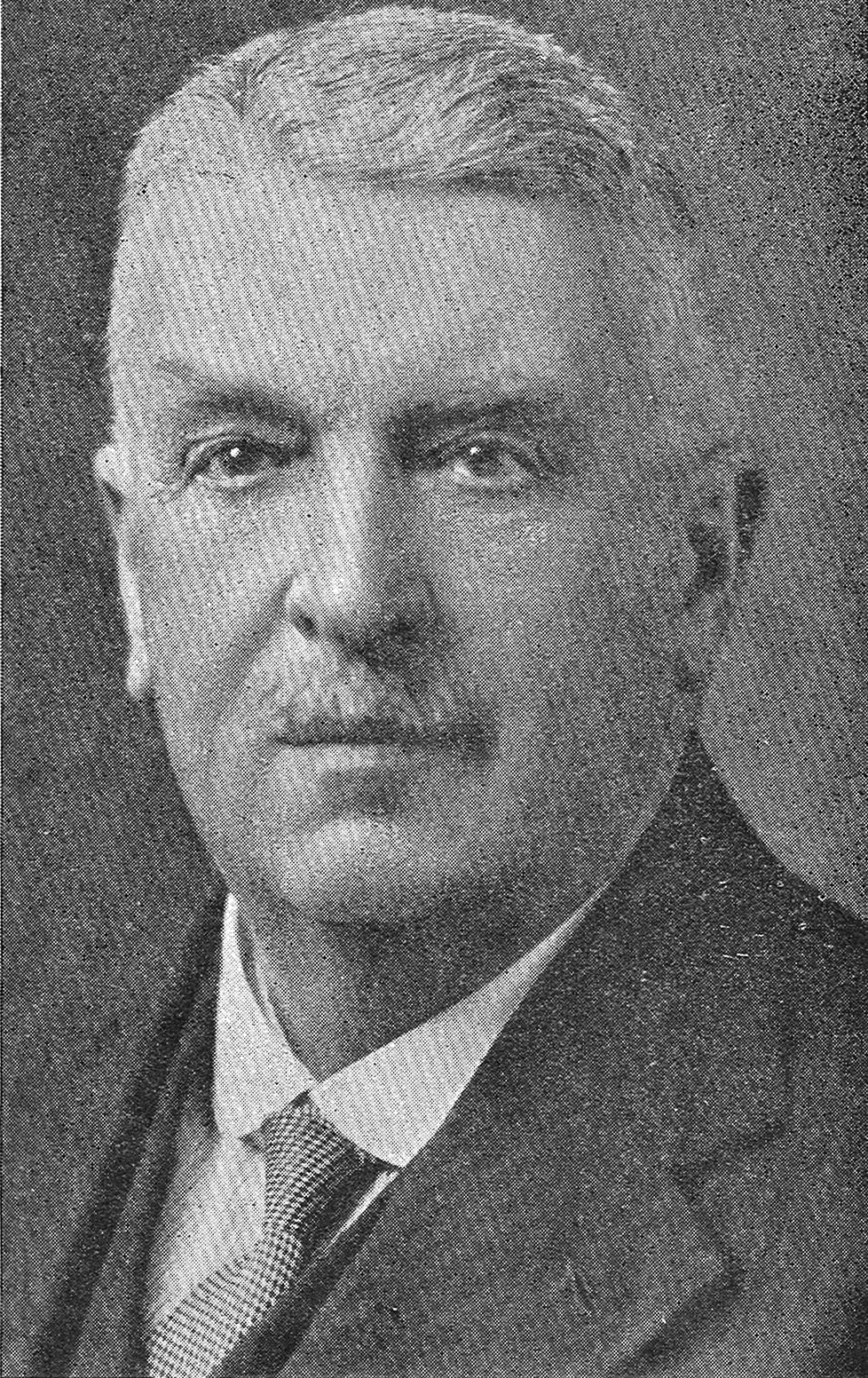
- Allen in 1938

Member of the New Zealand Legislative Council
- In office 22 June 1950 – 31 December 1950

47th Mayor of Dunedin
- In office 1938–1944
- Preceded by: Edwin Thoms Cox
- Succeeded by: Donald Charles Cameron

Personal details
- Born: Andrew Henson Allen; 23 December 1876 Caversham, New Zealand
- Died: 6 August 1963 (aged 86) Dunedin, New Zealand
- Party: National
- Spouse: Etta Elaine Peacock (m. 1904)
- Children: 2
- Occupation: Businessman

Andrew Henson Allen CBE JP (23 December 1876 – 6 August 1963) was a New Zealand businessman and politician. He served as mayor of Dunedin from 1938 to 1944, and was briefly a member of the Legislative Council.

== Biography ==
Born in the Dunedin suburb of Caversham on 23 December 1876, Allen was the son of John Allen, originally from Woodbridge, Suffolk, England, who arrived in New Zealand in 1867, and his wife Ellen Allen (née Godso), originally from Birmingham, England. He was educated in Caversham, and then worked for Hallenstein Brothers for 10 years before joining his father in business as a partner in John Allan and Son. The firm of wholesale merchants and manufacturers' agents became a limited liability company—Allen, Son, and McClure Limited—in 1907, and Allen succeeded his father as managing director in 1912.

On 13 January 1904, Allen married Etta Elaine Peacock at St Matthew's Church, Dunedin, and the couple went on to have two children.

Allen served two terms as mayor of Dunedin, from 1938 to 1944. In the 1938 mayoral election, he defeated the incumbent, Edwin Thoms Cox, by 17,929 to 13,891 votes. In the 1941 mayoral election, he defended a challenge by Gervan McMillan by 13,711 to 12,580 votes.

Outside of local politics, Allen was active in the commercial, civic and sporting life of Dunedin. He served as president of the Otago Importers and Shippers' Association, the Dunedin Chamber of Commerce, and the Otago Art Gallery Society. He also served on the board of governors of St Hilda's Collegiate School, the synod and standing committee of the Anglican Diocese of Dunedin, and the Dunedin Diocesan Trust Board, and was a justice of the peace. His pastimes included cricket, fishing and bowls, and he served as president of the St Kilda Bowling Club, the Otago Aero Club, and the Otago Cricket Association. Allen was a Freemason, and was a member of Lodge Otago Kilwinning, No. 143.

In the 1946 New Year Honours, Allen was appointed a Commander of the Order of the British Empire, for patriotic, and social-welfare services during his period of office as mayor.

Allen was appointed a member of the Legislative Council on 22 June 1950. He was appointed as a member of the suicide squad nominated by the First National Government in 1950 to vote for the abolition of the Council. Most of the new members (like Allen) were appointed on 22 June 1950, and served until 31 December 1950 when the Council was abolished.

Allen died in Dunedin on 6 August 1963.

Political offices
Preceded by Edwin Thoms Cox	Mayor of Dunedin; 1938–1944	Succeeded by Donald Cameron
