= Robson (surname) =

Robson is an English surname. Originating in North East England, and derived from ‘Son of Robert’. The name, Robson, can be found all over the North East of England and over the border into Scotland. The Robson family was also a notorious Border Reaver clan being one of the four riding clans of North Tynedale, with the family stronghold being Falstone in Northumberland. Notable people with the surname include:

== A-F ==
- Alan Robson (born 1955), English radio presenter
- Andrew Robson (born 1964), British international bridge player and columnist
- Aurora Robson (born 1972), Canadian-American artist
- Barry Robson (born 1978), Scottish footballer
- Bert Robson (1916–1990), English footballer
- Bobby Robson (1933–2009), English football manager
- Bryan Robson (born 1957), English football manager and player
- Pop Robson (born 1945), English football manager and player
- Charles Robson (disambiguation), multiple people, including:
  - Charles Robson (cricketer) (1859–1943), English cricketer and manager
  - Charles Robson (aviator) (1895–1958), British World War I flying ace
- David Robson (1873–1926), Scottish footballer
- Doug Robson (John Douglas Robson) (1942–2020), English footballer for Darlington
- Eddie Robson (born 1978), English comedy and science fiction writer
- Edward Robert Robson (1836–1917), English architect
- Euan Robson (born 1954), Scottish Liberal Democrat politician
- Flora Robson (1902–1984), English actress
- Frederick Robson (1821–1864), English actor, comedian, and ballad singer

== G-J ==
- Gary Robson (disambiguation), multiple people, including:
  - Gary Robson (darts player) (born 1967), English darts player
  - Gary Robson (footballer) (born 1965), English footballer
  - Gary D. Robson (born 1958), American author
- Guy Coburn Robson (1888–1945), British zoologist
- Helen Walton (née Robson; 1919–2007), American wife of Wal-Mart founder Sam Walton
- Henry Howey Robson (1894–1964), English recipient of the Victoria Cross
- Hugh Robson (disambiguation), multiple people, including:
  - Hugh Robson (politician) (1871–1945), Canadian politician and judge in Manitoba
  - Hugh Robson (educator) (1917–1977), Scottish Vice-Chancellor of the University of Sheffield and Principal of the University of Edinburgh
- Jack Robson (football manager) (1860–1922), English football secretary manager
- Jenny Shipley (née Robson; born 1952), New Zealand politician
- Jim Robson (1935–2026), Canadian radio and television broadcaster
- Jim Robson (politician) (1895–1975), Australian politician
- John Robson (disambiguation), multiple people, including:
  - John Robson (priest) (1581–1645), English Anglican priest
  - John Robson (politician) (1824–1892), Canadian journalist and politician, premier of the province of British Columbia
  - John Robson (Australian footballer) (1933–2011), Australian rules footballer
  - John Robson (footballer, born 1950) (1950–2004), English football full-back for Derby County and Aston Villa
  - John Robson (public servant) (1909–1993), New Zealand public servant and penal reformer
- Judy Robson (born 1939), American politician, State Senator from Wisconsin
- Justina Robson (born 1968), English science fiction author

== K-P ==
- Karrin Taylor Robson, American politician from Arizona
- Keith Robson (born 1953), English footballer
- Laura Robson (born 1994), Australian-English tennis player
- Lawrence Robson (1904–1982), British accountant and Liberal Party activist
- Linda Robson (born 1958), English actress and presenter
- Lucia St. Clair Robson, American historical novelist
- Luis Robson (born 1974), Brazilian football striker
- Mark Robson (1913–1978), Canadian-born film director, producer and editor
- Matt Robson (disambiguation), multiple people, including:
  - Matt Robson (born 1950), New Zealand politician
  - Matt Robson (footballer, born 1887), English footballer who played for Lincoln City
  - Matt Robson (footballer, born 1954), English footballer who played for Darlington
- Matty Robson (born 1985), English footballer
- May Robson (1858–1942), Australian-born actress and playwright
- Michael Robson (born 1995), Irish hockey player
- Murray Robson (1906–1974), Australian lawyer, soldier and a member of the New south Wales Parliament
- Naomi Robson, Australian television presenter
- Pop Robson (born 1945), English football centre forward

== R-W ==
- Ray Robson (born 1994), American chess grandmaster
- Richard Robson (politician) (1867–1928), Member of the Western Australian Legislative Assembly
- Richard Robson (chemist) (born 1937), Australian professor in chemistry
- Robbie Robson (1918–1996), New Zealand lawn bowls competitor
- Stewart Robson (born 1964), English footballer
- Stuart Robson (1836–1903), American comedic stage actor
- Thomas Robson (disambiguation), multiple people
- Wade Robson, Australian choreographer
- Wayne Robson (1946–2011), Canadian television, stage, and film actor
- William Robson (disambiguation), multiple people, including:
  - William Robson (1869–1951), Australian parliamentarian and businessman
  - William Robson (1843–1920), Australian politician
  - William Robson (Canadian politician) (1864–c. 1941), Canadian politician
  - William Robson (footballer) (fl. 1895), English football centre forward
  - William Robson, Baron Robson (1852–1918), British Member of Parliament, law officer, and law lord
  - William B. P. Robson, President and CEO of the C.D. Howe Institute
  - William N. Robson (1906–1995), American radio director and producer

== See also ==
- Robson (disambiguation)
- Robeson (disambiguation)
- Robinson (disambiguation)
