= 1962 Dunedin mayoral election =

Election in New Zealand

← 1959	13 October 1962	1965 →
- Turnout: 19,630
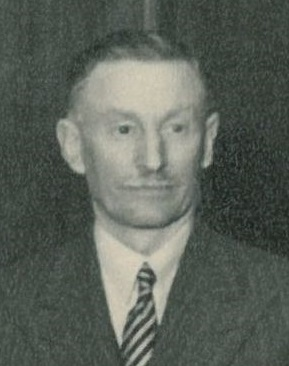

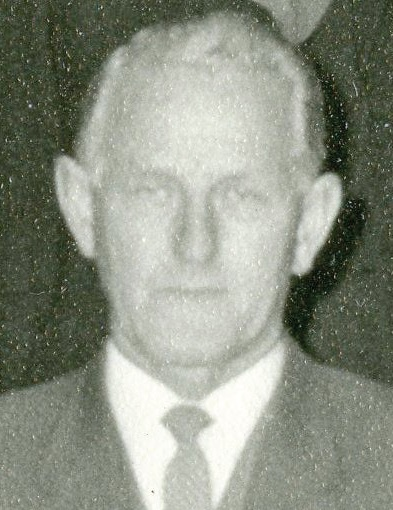
Candidate	Stuart Sidey	Russell Calvert
Party	Citizens'	Labour
Popular vote	10,003	9,541
Percentage	50.95	48.62
Mayor before election
Stuart Sidey
Elected mayor
Stuart Sidey

The 1962 Dunedin mayoral election was part of the New Zealand local elections held that same year. In 1962, elections were held for the Mayor of Dunedin plus other local government positions including twelve city councillors. The polling was conducted using the standard first-past-the-post electoral method.

== Background ==
Stuart Sidey, the incumbent Mayor was re-elected for a second term. He narrowly defeated councillor Russell Calvert who was the Labour Party candidate. Initially Phil Connolly the MP for Dunedin Central (who had run in 1953) was to be Labour's mayoral candidate, but was forced to withdraw on grounds of ill-health. Connolly was sure he would have won had he stood, a feeling which was reinforced after the comparatively inexperienced Calvert came so close to winning against Sidey.

The Citizens' Association increased their council representation, winning ten seats on the city council to the Labour Party's two.

== Results ==
The following table shows the results for the election:

1962 Dunedin mayoral election
Party	Candidate	Votes	%	±%
Citizens'	Stuart Sidey	10,003	50.95	−2.49
Labour	Russell Calvert	9,541	48.62	
Informal votes		86	0.43	−0.41
Majority		462	2.35	+5.38
Turnout		19,630		
