= 1950 Dunedin mayoral election =

Local election in New Zealand

- 18 November 1950
- Turnout: 23,240 (46.82%)
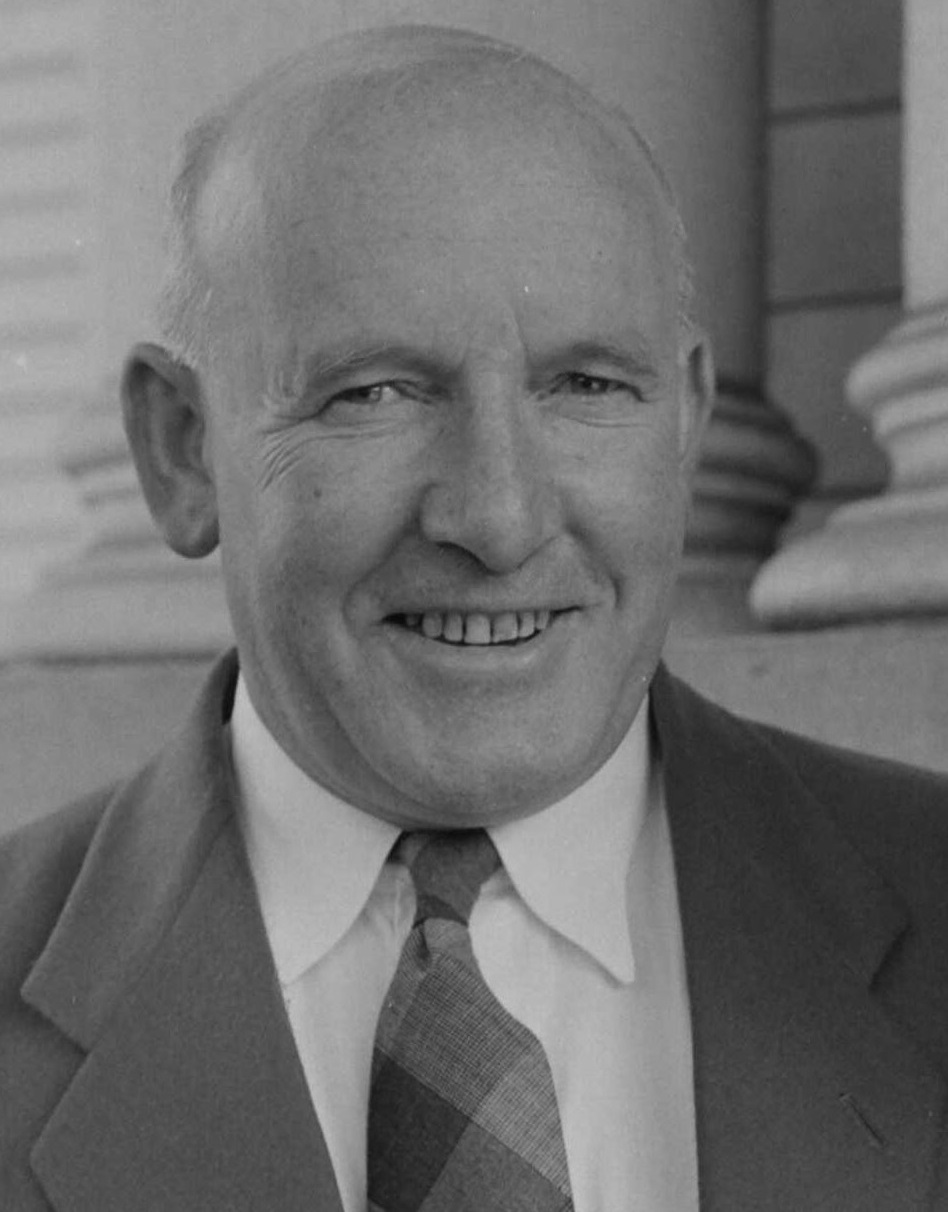

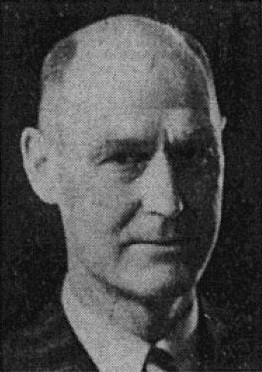
Candidate	Len Wright	Hubert Brown
Party	Citizens'	Labour
Popular vote	12,000	11,119
Percentage	51.63	47.85
Mayor before election
Donald Cameron
Elected mayor
Len Wright

The 1950 Dunedin mayoral election was part of the New Zealand local elections held that same year. In 1950, elections were held for the Mayor of Dunedin plus other local government positions including twelve city councillors. The polling was conducted using the standard first-past-the-post electoral method.

Donald Cameron, the incumbent Mayor, declined to run for a third term. He was succeeded by councillor Len Wright who narrowly defeated the Labour Party candidate Hubert Brown. There was also a swing against the Citizens' association on the city council with both the Labour Party and Citizens' tickets winning six seats each.

== Mayoral results ==
1950 Dunedin mayoral election
Party	Candidate	Votes	%	±%
Citizens'	Len Wright	12,000	51.63	
Labour	Hubert Brown	11,119	47.85	
Informal votes		121	0.52	+0.14
Majority		881	3.79	
Turnout		23,240	46.82	−18.15

== Council results ==
1950 Dunedin local election
Party	Candidate	Votes	%	±%
Labour	Gervan McMillan	12,776	54.97	+7.45
Labour	Michael Connelly	12,673	54.53	+9.47
Labour	Fred Jones	12,496	53.76	
Labour	Hubert Brown	12,361	53.18	
Citizens'	Jim Barnes	12,207	52.52	+0.97
Citizens'	Charlie Hayward	12,129	52.19	−0.09
Citizens'	Robert Forsyth-Barr	11,990	51.59	−0.92
Labour	Ethel McMillan	11,928	51.32	+8.87
Labour	Alister Abernethy	11,619	49.99	
Citizens'	William Taverner	11,598	49.90	−2.09
Citizens'	Norman Douglas Anderson	11,467	49.34	−2.48
Citizens'	Eric Anderson	11,463	49.32	−4.54
Citizens'	Stuart Sidey	11,443	49.23	−1.21
Citizens'	Milton Rowley Aldridge	11,398	49.04	
Citizens'	William Stewart Armitage	11,285	48.55	−1.44
Labour	Bill Fraser	10,943	47.08	
Citizens'	Robert Abraham Wilkie	10,826	46.58	
Labour	James Harrison	10,817	46.54	
Citizens'	Frederick Allan Keane	10,808	46.50	
Labour	Jack Stead	10,749	46.25	
Citizens'	Norman Duncan McKinlay	10,651	45.83	
Labour	Henry McManus	10,548	45.38	
Labour	John Harold Patrick Belfield	10,111	43.50	
Labour	Alphonso Daniel Hennessey	9,451	40.66	
Communist	Edgar Wilson Hunter	1,474	6.34	
Communist	Samuel Ikin	913	3.92	−1.47
