= 1956 Dunedin mayoral election =

Local election in Dunedin, New Zealand

← 1953	17 November 1956	1959 →
- Turnout: 24,463 (55.80%)
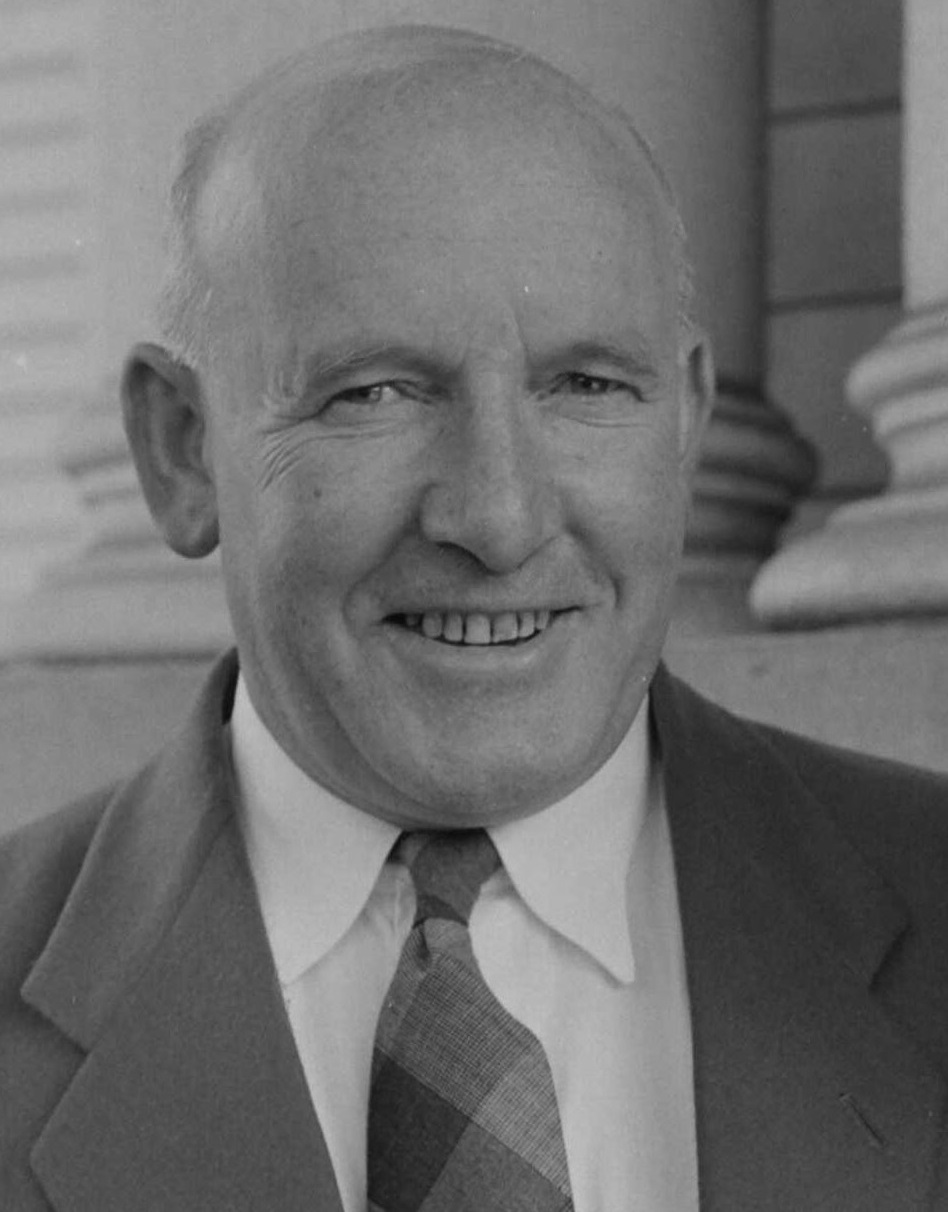

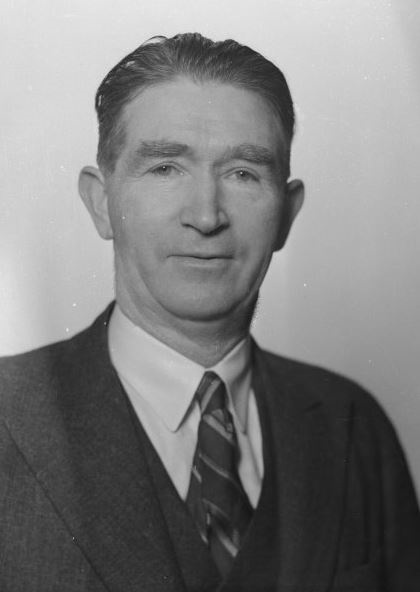
Candidate	Len Wright	Michael Connelly
Party	Citizens'	Labour
Popular vote	15,362	9,101
Percentage	62.79	37.20
Mayor before election
Len Wright
Elected mayor
Len Wright

The 1956 Dunedin mayoral election was part of the New Zealand local elections held that same year. In 1956, elections were held for the Mayor of Dunedin plus other local government positions including twelve city councillors. The polling was conducted using the standard first-past-the-post electoral method.

Len Wright, the incumbent Mayor, was re-elected for a third term, easily defeating his sole opponent councillor Michael Connelly of the Labour Party.

== Results ==
The following table shows the results for the election:

1956 Dunedin mayoral election
Party	Candidate	Votes	%	±%
Citizens	Len Wright	15,362	62.79	+12.88
Labour	Michael Connelly	9,101	37.20	
Majority		6,261	25.59	+18.94
Turnout		24,463	55.80	−8.40
