= 1971 Dunedin mayoral election =

New Zealand local election

← 1968	9 October 1971	1974 →
- Turnout: 23,157
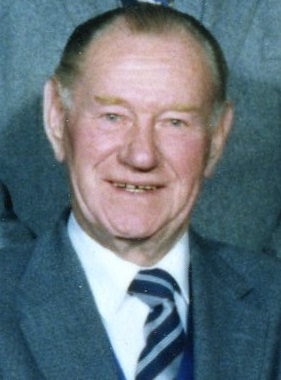

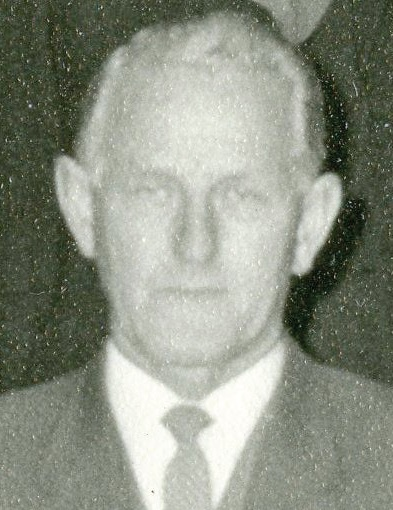
Candidate	Jim Barnes	Russell Calvert
Party	Citizens'	Labour
Popular vote	12,666	7,543
Percentage	54.69	32.57
Mayor before election
Jim Barnes
Elected mayor
Jim Barnes

The 1971 Dunedin mayoral election was part of the New Zealand local elections held that same year. In 1971, elections were held for the Mayor of Dunedin plus other local government positions including twelve city councillors. The polling was conducted using the standard first-past-the-post electoral method.

Jim Barnes, the incumbent Mayor was re-elected for a second term. He defeated former mayor Russell Calvert who had been re-elected to the council in a mid-term by-election. The state of parties remained unchanged on the city council with the Citizens' Association winning eight seats and the Labour Party four.

== Results ==
The following table shows the results for the election:

1971 Dunedin mayoral election
Party	Candidate	Votes	%	±%
Citizens'	Jim Barnes	12,666	54.69	+1.23
Labour	Russell Calvert	7,543	32.57	−6.86
Independent	Arthur Klap	2,808	12.12	
Informal votes		140	0.60	+0.09
Majority		5,123	22.12	+8.10
Turnout		23,157		
