= 1983 Dunedin mayoral election =

New Zealand mayoral election

← 1980	11 October 1983	1986 →
- Turnout: 21,034
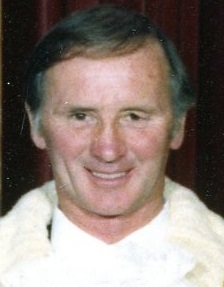

Candidate	Cliff Skeggs	Terry Scott
Party	Citizens'	Labour
Popular vote	14,132	5,834
Percentage	67.18	27.73
Mayor before election
Cliff Skeggs
Elected mayor
Cliff Skeggs

The 1983 Dunedin mayoral election was part of the New Zealand local elections held that same year. In 1983, elections were held for the Mayor of Dunedin plus other local government positions including twelve city councillors. The polling was conducted using the standard first-past-the-post electoral method.

== Background ==
Mayor Cliff Skeggs was re-elected for a third term defeating two other candidates, though his majority fell. The Citizens' retained their comfortable council majority, winning nine seats with two won by independents and one seat to the Labour Party.

== Results ==
The following table shows the results for the election:

1983 Dunedin mayoral election
Party	Candidate	Votes	%	±%
Citizens'	Cliff Skeggs	14,132	67.18	−9.16
Labour	Terry Scott	5,834	27.73	
Independent	Murray Menzies	786	3.73	
Informal votes		282	1.34	−0.26
Majority		8,298	39.45	−14.84
Turnout		21,034		
