= 1977 Dunedin mayoral election =

New Zealand mayoral election

← 1974	8 October 1977	1980 →
- Turnout: 25,236 (54.16%)
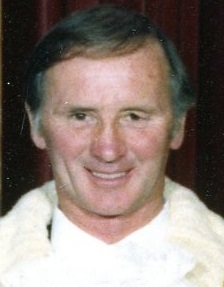

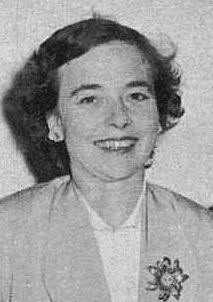

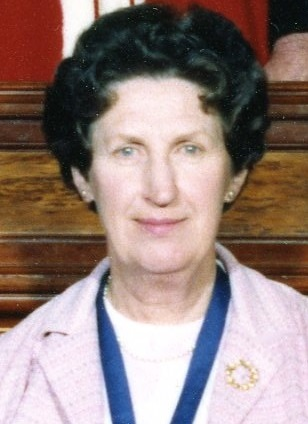
Candidate	Cliff Skeggs	Dorothy Fraser	Iona Williams
Party	Citizens'	Labour	Independent
Popular vote	11,216	7,590	6,171
Percentage	44.44	30.07	24.45
Mayor before election
Jim Barnes
Elected mayor
Cliff Skeggs

The 1977 Dunedin mayoral election was part of the New Zealand local elections held that same year. In 1977, elections were held for the Mayor of Dunedin plus other local government positions including twelve city councillors. The polling was conducted using the standard first-past-the-post electoral method.

== Background ==
Councillor Cliff Skeggs was elected Mayor of Dunedin to succeed Jim Barnes, who stood down from the mayoralty but was elected as a councillor. He defeated councillor Dorothy Fraser of the Labour Party, who was re-elected to the Hospital Board of which she was chairman. Former Citizens' councillor Iona Williams also contested to mayoralty, polling higher than any independent mayoral candidate since 1933.

== Results ==
The following table shows the results for the election:

1977 Dunedin mayoral election
Party	Candidate	Votes	%	±%
Citizens	Cliff Skeggs	11,216	44.44	
Labour	Dorothy Fraser	7,590	30.07	
Independent	Iona Williams	6,171	24.45	
Informal votes		259	1.02	−1.23
Majority		3,626	14.36	
Turnout		25,236	54.16	
