= Matt Robson (disambiguation) =

Matt Robson (born 1950) is a New Zealand politician.

Matthew, Matt or Matty Robson may refer to:

- Matt Robson (footballer, born 1887) (1887 – after 1919), English footballer who played for Lincoln City
- Matt Robson (footballer, born 1954), English footballer who played for Darlington
- Matty Robson (born 1985), English footballer who played for Hartlepool United and Carlisle United
- Matthew Robson (rugby union) (1908–1983), England national rugby union player
- Matthew D. Robson, British engineer, academic, and technology executive
