= William Robson =

William Robson may refer to:

== Politicians ==
- William Robson (1869–1951), Australian parliamentarian and businessman
- William Robson (1843–1920), Australian politician
- William Robson, Baron Robson (1852–1918), British member of parliament, law officer, and law lord
- William Robson (Canadian politician) (1864–1941), Canadian politician

== Other people ==
- William B. P. Robson (born 1959), president and CEO of the C.D. Howe Institute
- William N. Robson (1906–1995), American radio director and producer
- William Robson (writer) (1785/6–1863), British author and translator
- William Robson (footballer) (fl. 1895), English football centre forward
- William Robson (cricketer) (born 1946), English cricketer
- William Wallace Robson (1923–1993), British literary critic and scholar
- William A. Robson (1895–1980), professor of public administrative law
