= John Robson =

John or Jack Robson may refer to:

== In sports ==
- Jack Robson (football manager) (1860–1922), English full-time secretary manager of football clubs, including Middlesbrough and Manchester United
- Jack Robson (footballer) (1906–1966), English footballer
- John Robson (Australian footballer) (1933–2011), played with Richmond and St Kilda in the VFL
- John Robson (footballer, born 1950) (1950–2004), English football full-back for Derby County and Aston Villa
- John Robson (athlete) (born 1957), British middle-distance runner
- John Robson (canoeist), British canoe sailor
- Doug Robson (1942–2020), born John Douglas Robson and listed as John Robson in some databases, English football centre half for Darlington

== Other people ==
- John Robson (priest) (1581–1645), English Anglican priest who was elected to the House of Commons in 1621
- John Robson (politician) (1824–1892), Canadian journalist and politician, Premier of the Province of British Columbia
- Jack Robson (songwriter) (1885–1957), English Northumberland-born singer, musician and songwriter
- John Robson (public servant) (1909–1993), New Zealand public servant and penal reformer
- John E. Robson (1930–2002), American attorney and United States Deputy Secretary of the Treasury
