= 1965 Dunedin mayoral election =

Local election in New Zealand

- 9 October 1965
- Turnout: 20,432 (44.96%)
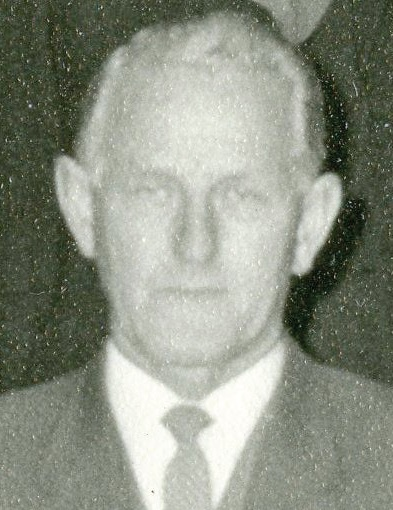

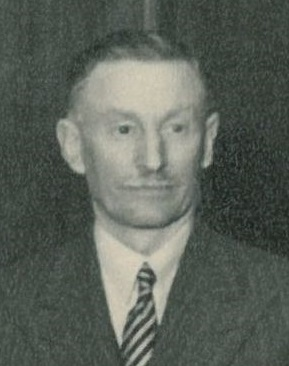
Candidate	Russell Calvert	Stuart Sidey
Party	Labour	Citizens'
Popular vote	10,444	8,964
Percentage	51.11	43.87
Mayor before election
Stuart Sidey
Elected mayor
Russell Calvert

The 1965 Dunedin mayoral election was part of the New Zealand local elections held that same year. In 1965, elections were held for the Mayor of Dunedin plus other local government positions including twelve city councillors. The polling was conducted using the standard first-past-the-post electoral method.

Incumbent Stuart Sidey was defeated in his bid for a third term by Labour Party city councillor Russell Calvert. Calvert became only Dunedin's second Labour mayor after Edwin Thoms Cox. The Citizens' Association won seven seats on the city council to Labour's five.

== Results ==
The following table shows the results for the election:

1965 Dunedin mayoral election
Party	Candidate	Votes	%	±%
Labour	Russell Calvert	10,444	51.11	+2.49
Citizens'	Stuart Sidey	8,964	43.87	−7.08
Independent	Alex Steven Alpin	925	4.52	
Informal votes		99	0.48	+0.05
Majority		1,480	7.24	
Turnout		20,432	44.96	
