= 1974 Dunedin mayoral election =

New Zealand mayoral election

← 1971	12 October 1974	1977 →
- Turnout: 26,172
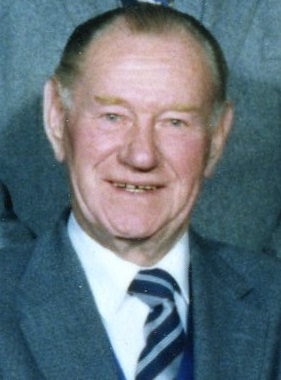

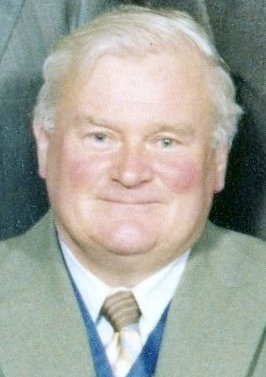
Candidate	Jim Barnes	Brian Arnold
Party	Citizens'	Labour
Popular vote	13,820	9,279
Percentage	52.80	35.45
Mayor before election
Jim Barnes
Elected mayor
Jim Barnes

The 1974 Dunedin mayoral election was part of the New Zealand local elections held that same year. In 1974, elections were held for the Mayor of Dunedin plus other local government positions including twelve city councillors. The polling was conducted using the standard first-past-the-post electoral method.

Jim Barnes, the incumbent Mayor was re-elected for a third term. He defeated councillor Brian Arnold of the Labour Party. In the city council voting, the Citizens' Association won seven seats, the Labour Party four and one independent was successful.

== Results ==
The following table shows the results for the election:

1974 Dunedin mayoral election
Party	Candidate	Votes	%	±%
Citizens'	Jim Barnes	13,820	52.80	−1.89
Labour	Brian Arnold	9,279	35.45	
Independent	Gordon Brian Heslop	2,482	9.48	
Informal votes		591	2.25	+1.65
Majority		4,541	17.35	−4.77
Turnout		26,172		
