= Robson =

Robson may refer to:

== People ==
=== Surname ===
- Robson (surname), a surname and list of people with that name

=== Given name ===
- Robson Bonnichsen (1940–2004), American anthropologist
- Robson (footballer, born 1959), full name Robson Caetano Duarte, Brazilian football forward
- Robson Green (born 1964), British actor
- Róbson (footballer, born 1970), born José Róbson do Nascimento, Brazilian politician and football forward
- Luis Robson (born 1974), birth name Robson Luis Pereira da Silva, Brazilian footballer
- Robson de Souza, (born 1984), Brazilian football player, better known as Robinho
- Robson Alves da Silva (born 1986), Brazilian football player for Gold Coast United
- Robson Severino da Silva (born 1983), Brazilian football player for Waasland-Beveren
- Robson Vaz Shimabuku (born 1988), Brazilian football player
- S. Robson Walton (born 1944), eldest son of Sam Walton

== Places ==
- Robson, British Columbia, a small community
- Robson, West Virginia, an unincorporated village in Fayette County, West Virginia, United States
- Mount Robson, a mountain in the Canadian Rockies
- Robson Square, landmark civic centre and public plaza in Vancouver, British Columbia
- Robson Street, Vancouver, British Columbia

== See also ==
- Robson Arms, a Canadian television series
- Robson flash memory, a technology from Intel to boost computer startup
- Prince George-Mount Robson, a provincial electoral district
- Robson & Jerome, an English pop duo
- Robson Rotation, a method of printing ballots
