= David Laidler =

English economist (born 1938)

David Laidler FRSC
- Born: 12 August 1938 (age 88); North Shields, England

Academic background
- Education: London School of Economics (BSc Econ); Syracuse University (MA); University of Chicago (PhD)

Academic work
- School or tradition: monetary economics
- Institutions: University of California, Berkeley; University of Essex; University of Manchester; University of Western Ontario
- Awards: Donner Prize

David Ernest William Laidler FRSC (born 12 August 1938, North Shields, England) is an English/Canadian economist who has been one of the foremost scholars of monetarism. He published major economics journal articles on the topic in the late 1960s and early 1970s. His book, The Demand for Money, was published in four editions from 1969 through 1993 (with slightly altered subtitles), initially setting forth the stability of the relationship between income and the demand for money and later taking into consideration the effects of legal, technological, and institutional changes on the demand for money. The book has been translated into French, Spanish, Italian, Japanese, and Chinese.

His continued work on the demand for money through the 1990s and into the 21st century (with William B. P. Robson) led to his receiving the Donner Prize in 2004 for Two Percent Target: Canadian Monetary Policy Since 1991, published by the C.D. Howe Institute, with which Laidler maintains a close working relationship.

His other major publication, Introduction to Microeconomics, was also published in four editions, from 1974 to 2008. It was translated into Spanish, Polish, Italian, and Bulgarian.

Later in his career, Laidler shifted focus to the history of economic thought. Despite being retired, he is still an active researcher and scholar.

== Education ==
- Tynemouth School, Tynemouth, Northumberland, England, GCE 'O' Level 1953, 'A' Level, 1955, 'S' Level, 1956
- London School of Economics, BSc Econ. (Economics Analytic and Descriptive) 1st Class Honours, 1959
- Syracuse University, M.A. (Economics), 1960
- University of Chicago, PhD (Economics), 1964

== Academic affiliations ==
In addition to many visiting appointments, David Laidler has held full-time teaching positions at the University of California, Berkeley, the University of Essex, and the University of Manchester, but from 1975 onward his primary academic affiliation has been with the University of Western Ontario. He was named a Fellow of the Royal Society of Canada in 1982 and served as president of the Canadian Economic Association, 1987–88.

== Academic honours ==
- 1982, Fellow of the Royal Society of Canada
- 1987–88, President, Canadian Economics Association/Association Canadienne d'Economique
- 1988–89, Faculty of Social Science Research Professor, University of Western Ontario
- 1994, Douglas Purvis Memorial Prize, awarded by the Canadian Economics Association for a significant work on Canadian Economic Policy (joint recipient with William B.P. Robson)
- 1999, Hellmuth Prize for distinguished research in the Humanities and Social Sciences by a member of the faculty of the University of Western Ontario
- 2004–05, Donner Prize for the best book of the year on Canadian public policy. (Joint recipient with William B.P. Robson)

== Bibliography ==
=== Books and monographs ===
- The Demand for Money – Theories and Evidence, Scranton, PA, International Textbook Company, 1969; 2nd edition, New York, NY, T.Y. Crowell, 1977. 3rd Edition, (The Demand for Money, Theories, Evidence and Problems) New York, Harper Row, 1985. 4th Edition, New York, Harper-Collins, 1993. (Spanish translation 1972, French translation 1975, Italian translation 1976, Spanish translation of 2nd Edition 1981, Japanese translation of 3rd edition 1989, Chinese Translation of 3rd Edition, Shanghai 1990).
- Introduction to Microeconomics, Oxford, Philip Allan Publishers, Ltd., 1974; New York, Basic Books, 1975. 2nd Edition, Oxford, Philip Allan Publishers, Ltd., New York, Halstead Press, 1981, 3rd edition (with Saul Estrin) Hemel Hempstead, Philip Allan Publishers Ltd. 1989. 4th edition, with (Saul Estrin) Hemel Hempstead, Harvester Wheatsheaf, 1994. (Spanish translation of 1st edition, 1979, Polish translation of 3rd Edition, 1992, Italian translation of 3rd Edition, 1992, Spanish translation of 3rd edition, 1992, Bulgarian translation of 3rd Edition, 1992, Spanish translation of 4th edition, 1995).
- Essays on Money and Inflation, Manchester, Manchester University Press, Chicago, University Chicago Press, 1975. (Republished, Aldershot, Gregg Revivals, 1993)
- Monetarist Perspectives, Oxford, Philip Allan Publishers, Ltd.; Cambridge, Harvard University Press,1982. (Japanese Translation 1987).
- Taking Money Seriously, Hemel Hempstead, Philip Allan Publishers, Ltd.; Cambridge, MIT Press, 1990.
- The Golden Age of the Quantity Theory: The Development of Neoclassical Monetary Economics: 1870–1914. Philip Allan Pub. Ltd.; Princeton UP. 1991. ISBN 9780691042954. (Japanese Translation, 2000, republished, Pearson Education Print on Demand Edition, Harlow, UK., 5 2002). Description & review.
- How Shall We Govern the Governor? A Critique of the Governance of the Bank of Canada, Toronto, C.D. Howe Institute, 1991.
- Two Nations One Money? Canada's Monetary System Following a Quebec Secession, Toronto, C.D. Howe Institute 1991 (with W.B.P. Robson, et al.).
- The Great Canadian Disinflation: The Economics and Politics of Monetary Policy in Canada 1988–1993, Toronto, C.D. Howe Institute 1993 (with W.B.P. Robson).
- Money and Macroeconomics: The Selected Essays of David Laidler. Cheltenham, UK, Lyme, US: Edward Elgar (Economists of the Twentieth Century Series). 1997. ISBN 9781858985961.
- Fabricating the Keynesian Revolution: Studies of the Inter-war Literature on Money, the Cycle, and Unemployment, Cambridge, UK, and New York, Cambridge University Press, 1999
- Two Percent Target: Canadian Monetary Policy Since 1991, Toronto, C. D. Howe Institute, 2004 (with W.B.P.Robson)
- Macroeconomics in Retrospect: The Selected Essays of David Laidler, Cheltenham UK, Lyme US, Edward Elgar 2004 (Economists of the Twentieth Century Series)

=== Selected articles ===
- "Some Evidence on the Demand for Money", Journal of Political Economy, February 1966, 55–68.
- "The Rate of Interest and the Demand for Money – Some Empirical Evidence", Journal of Political Economy, December 1966, 543–55.
- "The Phillips Relation: A Theoretical Explanation", Economica, May 1967, 189–97 (with B.A. Corry).
- "The Permanent Income Concept in a Macroeconomic Model", Oxford Economic Papers, March 1968, 11–23.
- "The Definition of Money – Theoretical and Empirical Problems", Journal of Money, Credit and Banking, August 1969, 508–25.
- "Money, Wealth and Time Preference in a Stationary Economy", Canadian Journal of Economics, 6 November 1969, 526–35
- "The Demand for Money in the UK. 1956–1967, Preliminary Estimates", The Manchester School, September 1970 (with J.M. Parkin), 187–208.
- "Expectations, Adjustment and the Dynamic Response of Income to Policy Changes", Journal of Money, Credit and Banking, February 1973, 157–72.
- "Simultaneous Fluctuations in Prices and Output – A Business Cycle Approach", Economica, February 1973, 60–72.
- "Monetarist Policy Prescriptions and their Background", The Manchester School, March 1973, 59–71.
- "Information, Money and the Macroeconomics of Inflation", The Swedish Journal of Economics, Vol. 76, 1974, 26–42. (German translation by Klaus Hennings, Kieler Vortrage 81, J.C.B. Mohr, Tübingen, 1975.)
- "The 1974 Report of the President's Council of Economic Advisors: The Control of Inflation and the Future of the International Monetary System", American Economic Review, September 1974, 535–43.
- "Inflation – A Survey", Economic Journal, December 1975, 741–809 (with J.M. Parkin).
- "Inflation in Britain – A Monetarist Perspective", American Economic Review, September 1976, 485–500.
- "Expectations and the Behaviour of Prices and Output Under Flexible Exchange Rates", Economica, November 1977, 327–36.
- "Recent Macroeconomic Policy Proposals of the Joint Economic Committee on the US. Congress: A Critique", Journal of Monetary Economics, July 1979, 397–412.
- "An Empirical Model of an Open Economy Under Fixed Exchange Rates – The United Kingdom 1954–1970", Economica NS 47, May 1980, 141–58 (with P. O'Shea).
- "Simmel's Philosophy of Money – A Review Article for Economists", Journal of Economic Literature, March 1980, 97–105 (with N. Rowe)
- "Review of The Shadow of Keynes." Journal of Political Economy 86 (1980): 1269—74.
- "Monetarism – An Interpretation and an Assessment", Economic Journal 91, March 1981, 1–21. 7
- Laidler, David (May 1981). "Adam Smith as a Monetary Economist". Canadian Journal of Economics. 14 (2): 185–201. doi:10.2307/134793. JSTOR 134793.
- "Friedman and Schwartz on Monetary Trends – A Review Article", Journal of International Money and Finance 1, 1982, 293–305.
- "Misconceptions About the Real Bills Doctrine – A Comment on Sargent and Wallace", Journal of Political Economy, February 1984, 149–55.
- "Harry Johnson as a Macrooeconomist", Journal of Political Economy, August 1984, 592–615
- "The 'Buffer Stock' Notion in Monetary Economics." Economic Journal, 94 (Supplement 1984): 17—34.
- "Money in Crisis – A Review Essay" Journal of Monetary Economics 17 1986, 305–13.
- "Some Macroeconomic Consequences of Price Stickiness" Manchester School March 1988 37–54.
- "Are Perceptions of Inflation Rational? Some Evidence from Sweden" (with L. Jonung) American Economic Review, Dec. 1988, 1080–87.
- "Dow and Saville's Critique of Monetary Policy – A Review Essay", Journal of Economic Literature 27 September 1989 1147–59.
- "Hicks and the Classics" Journal of Monetary Economics 25, June 1990, 481–89.
- "The Quantity Theory is Always and Everywhere Controversial – Why?", Economic Record, December 1991, 289–306.
- "Hawtrey, Harvard, and the Origins of the Chicago Tradition," Journal of Political Economy 101, December 1993, 1068–103.
- "Notes on the Microfoundations of Monetary Economics," Economic Journal, 107, July 1997, 1213–23.
- "Phillips in Retrospect" Research in the History of Economic Thought and Methodology : A Research Annual 20-A 2002, pp. 223–35
- "Skidelsky's Keynes: a Review Essay" European Journal of the History of Economic Thought 9 (Spring) 2002 97—110
- "Monetary Policy after Bubbles Burst: the Zero Lower Bound, the Liquidity Trap and the Credit Deadlock" Canadian Public Policy 30 (3) September 2004, 333–40
- "Woodford and Wicksell on Interest and Prices: the Place of the Pure Credit Economy in the Theory of Monetary 9 Policy" Journal of the History of Economic Thought, 28 (2) June 2006, 151–59

== Notes ==
Government offices
Preceded by None	Special Adviser for Bank of Canada; 1998–1999	Succeeded by Daniel Racette
