= Dorothy Fraser =

New Zealand local politician (1926–2015)

Dame Dorothy Fraser DBE QSO JP
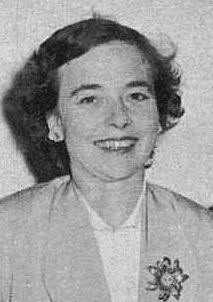
- Fraser in 1958
- Born: Dorothy Rita Tucker; 3 May 1926; Nūhaka, New Zealand
- Died: 24 May 2015 (aged 89); Dunedin, New Zealand
- Occupation(s): Community activist, politician
- Spouse: Bill Fraser (m. 1947; died 2001)
- Children: 2

Dame Dorothy Rita Fraser DBE QSO JP (née Tucker, 3 May 1926 – 24 May 2015) was a New Zealand community activist and local politician.

== Biography ==
=== Early life and career ===
Fraser was raised in Nūhaka, Hawkes Bay. Her parents were Ernest and Kate Tucker, the first of their eight children, and she had Ngāti Kahungunu ancestry. She was educated in Gisborne at Kaiti School (1936–39) and then Gisborne High School (1939–43).

At an early age, she was interested in politics and she obtained special dispensation to join the Labour Party when she was 14 years old, becoming the youngest person to ever join the Labour Party in its history. She proceeded to form a junior branch of the Labour Party in Gisborne. At age 15 she was the branch delegate to the annual Labour Party conference, the youngest person there.

In 1947 she married Bill Fraser, and had two children together. Bill was MP for St Kilda from 1957 to 1981 and Dorothy worked for many years as his unpaid electorate secretary. It was said by contemporaries such as Warren Freer that Fraser overshadowed her husband with many thinking that she was better suited to be in Parliament.

=== Political career ===
She served on the Dunedin Hospital Board for 27 years from 1953 to 1956 and again between 1962 and 1986. She served as the chair of the board between 1974 and 1986, the first woman to do so. Initially, she had to be persuaded to stand for the Hospital Board and did not expect to win. She was stunned at her election and the Monday after she planned to resign her seat but was talked out of it by friends.

She was a Dunedin City Councillor for four years, winning a by-election in 1970 (only the second woman elected) and was re-elected in 1971. In 1977 she unsuccessfully stood for Dunedin's mayoralty, finishing second to Cliff Skeggs.

She was on the executive of the Labour Party from 1958 to 1961 and was made a life member of the party. When her husband Bill announced in 1979 he would retire as MP for St Kilda, Fraser sought to replace him as the Labour nominee in the seat. This caused confusion as it contradicted Bill stating that his main reason for retiring was to spend more time with his family. She nevertheless became a front-runner to win the nomination, alongside university lecturer Michael Cullen, from a field of seven nominees. At the selection meeting in April 1980, she performed worse than expected. Speaking early, she had a runny nose from a cold and was too short to reach the microphone to be heard properly. She ultimately lost the nomination to Cullen.

=== Later life and death ===
She served on over 40 small community organisations and directorships and consultancies including the Gibbs Committee (1987–88) and Monticello Trust Board (2001–08).

Fraser died on 24 May 2015, aged 89. Her funeral service attracted 300 mourners.

== Honours and awards ==
Dunedin Hospital's Fraser Building/Whare Fraser, in Hanover St.

Fraser was made a justice of the peace in 1959, and in 1977 she was awarded the Queen Elizabeth II Silver Jubilee Medal. In the 1978 New Year Honours, she was appointed a Companion of the Queen's Service Order for public services. The Otago Hospital Board named a hospital building on the corner of Cumberland St and Hanover St the Fraser Building. She was made a Dame Commander of the Order of the British Empire in the 1987 New Year Honours, for services to the Otago Hospital Board and the community.

She was given an honorary Doctorate of Literature from University of Otago in 1994.

== Legacy ==
In 2012 the Dame Dorothy Fraser Lecture was instigated, an annual event to highlight the achievements of women in politics. The inaugural lecture was given by former Prime Minister Helen Clark.

Speakers have included:

- Helen Kelly (2013)
- Marilyn Waring (2014)
- Louise Nicholas (2015)
- Barbara Brookes (2016)
- Annette King (2017)
- Alison Mau (2018)
- Deborah Russell, Liz Craig, Kiri Allan and Marja Lubeck (2019)
- Helen Clark (2020)
- Lianne Dalziel (2022)
- Louisa Wall (2023)
