= 1968 Dunedin mayoral election =

Local election in New Zealand

- 12 October 1968
- Turnout: 22,811
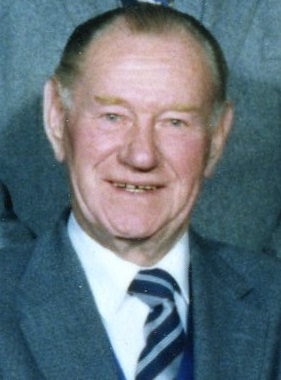

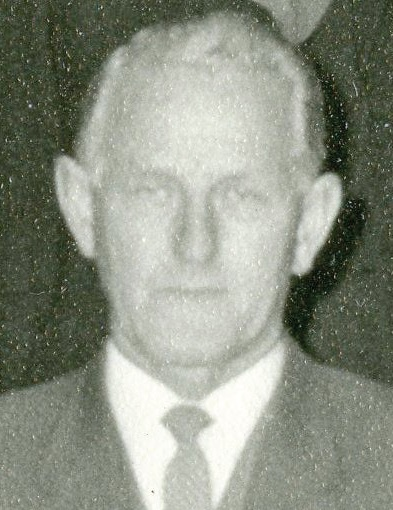
Candidate	Jim Barnes	Russell Calvert
Party	Citizens'	Labour
Popular vote	12,195	8,995
Percentage	53.46	39.43
Mayor before election
Russell Calvert
Elected mayor
Jim Barnes

The 1968 Dunedin mayoral election was part of the New Zealand local elections held that same year. In 1968, elections were held for the Mayor of Dunedin plus other local government positions including twelve city councillors. The polling was conducted using the standard first-past-the-post electoral method.

Russell Calvert, the incumbent Mayor, was defeated running for a second term by Citizens' city councillor Jim Barnes. The Citizens' Association increased their representation, winning eight seats on the city council to the Labour Party's four.

== Results ==
The following table shows the results for the election:

1968 Dunedin mayoral election
Party	Candidate	Votes	%	±%
Citizens'	Jim Barnes	12,195	53.46	
Labour	Russell Calvert	8,995	39.43	−11.68
Independent	Paul Wedderspoon	1,504	6.59	
Informal votes		117	0.51	+0.03
Majority		3,200	14.02	
Turnout		22,811		
