= 1953 Dunedin mayoral election =

Local election in Dunedin, New Zealand

- 31 October 1953
- Turnout: 30,891 (64.20%)
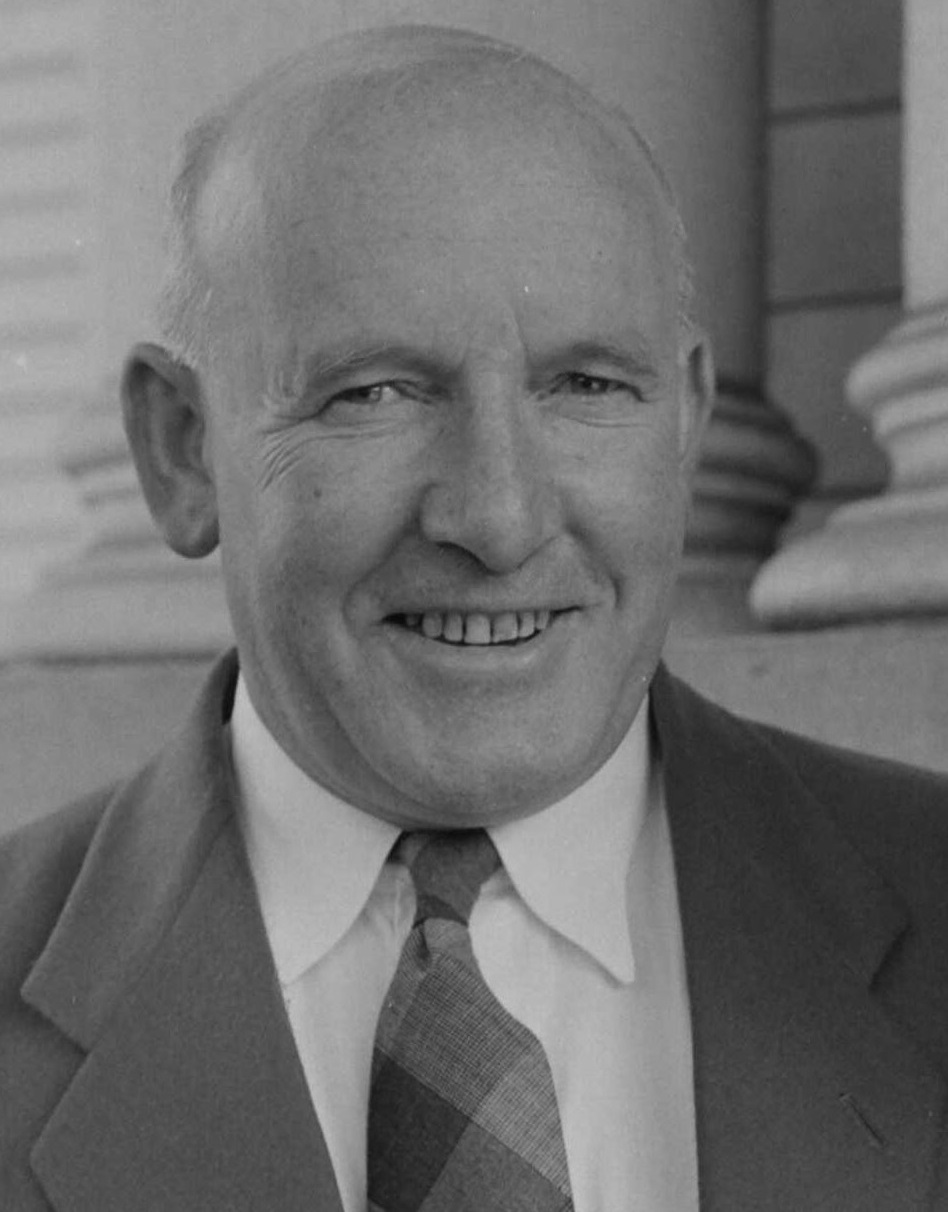

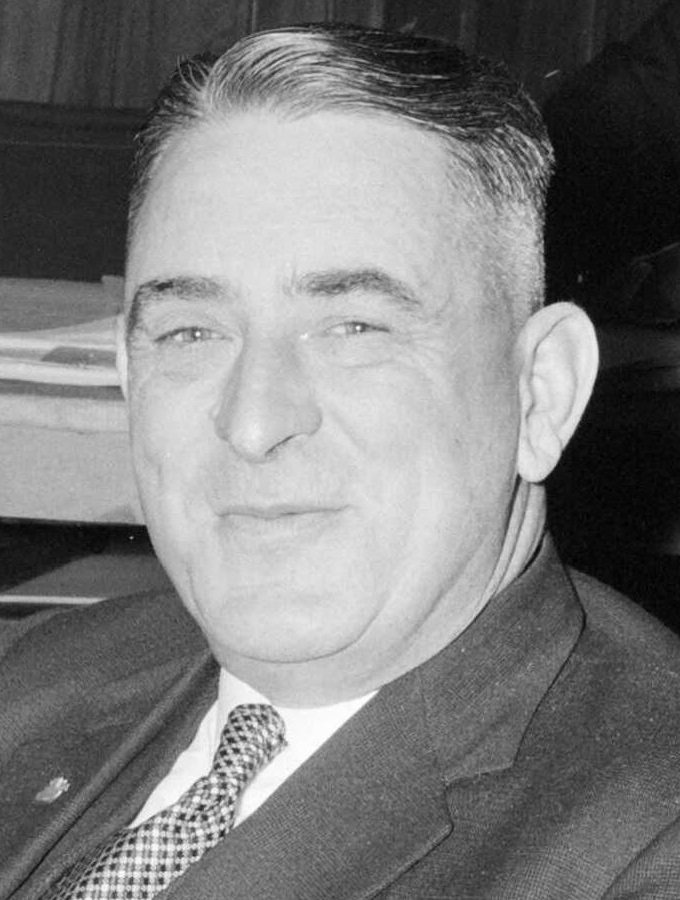
Candidate	Len Wright	Phil Connolly
Party	Citizens'	Labour
Popular vote	15,420	13,365
Percentage	49.91	43.26
Mayor before election
Len Wright
Elected mayor
Len Wright

The 1953 Dunedin mayoral election was part of the New Zealand local elections held that same year. In 1953, elections were held for the Mayor of Dunedin plus other local government positions including twelve city councillors. The polling was conducted using the standard first-past-the-post electoral method.

== Campaign ==
A major talking point in the lead up to the election was the potential of a clash with the 1953 Royal Tour. There were proposals to postpone local elections until early 1954 over fears of reduced turnout due to a conflicted schedule. The proposals were considered by the Minister of Internal Affairs William Bodkin, who ultimately decided against it.

Len Wright, the incumbent Mayor, was re-elected for a second term. He defeated a spirited challenge from Phil Connolly the sitting Labour MP for Dunedin Central, who despite losing the mayoralty was elected to the Otago Harbour Board, where he became deputy-chairman. Initially the Labour Party won a 8-4 majority on the city council, however after a recount Citizens' candidate Stuart Sidey displaced Labour's James Dalziel as the lowest polling successful candidate amending the party split to 7-5.

== Mayoral results ==
1953 Dunedin mayoral election
Party	Candidate	Votes	%	±%
Citizens'	Len Wright	15,420	49.91	−1.72
Labour	Phil Connolly	13,365	43.26	
Independent	Charlie Hayward	2,106	6.81	
Majority		2,055	6.65	+2.86
Turnout		30,891	64.20	+17.38

== Council results ==
1953 Dunedin local election
Party	Candidate	Votes	%	±%
Labour	Fred Jones	18,745	60.68	+6.92
Labour	Ethel McMillan	18,121	58.66	+7.34
Labour	Michael Connelly	17,490	56.61	+2.08
Labour	Hubert Brown	16,550	53.57	+0.39
Labour	Alister Abernethy	15,953	51.64	+1.65
Citizens'	Robert Forsyth-Barr	15,006	48.57	−3.02
Labour	Jack Stead	14,874	48.14	+1.89
Citizens'	Norman Douglas Anderson	14,171	45.87	−3.47
Citizens'	William Taverner	14,048	45.47	−4.43
Labour	Bill Fraser	13,789	44.63	+2.45
Citizens'	Robert William Botting	13,438	43.50	
Citizens'	Stuart Sidey	13,111	42.44	+6.79
Labour	James Dalziel	13,100	42.40	
Labour	Doug Sutherland	12,984	42.03	
Citizens'	Robert Stuart Glendenning	12,902	41.76	
Labour	Noel George Tohmar	12,794	41.41	
Labour	William Johnstone Penfold	12,774	41.35	
Citizens'	James Charles Scoular	12,615	40.83	
Citizens'	Kevin John Marlow	12,511	40.50	
Citizens'	Charles Jerram	12,363	40.02	
Labour	Frederick Rudkin	12,003	38.85	
Independent	William Stewart Armitage	10,857	35.14	−13.41
Citizens'	Albert Perry Greenfield	10,626	34.39	
Independent	Charlie Hayward	9,911	32.08	−20.11
Citizens'	Eric Hugh Levido	9,813	31.76	
Citizens'	Augustus Benson Pope	7,814	25.29	
Communist	Edgar Wilson Hunter	1,811	5.86	+1.94
