= Julia Wallace =

New Zealand educator and politician

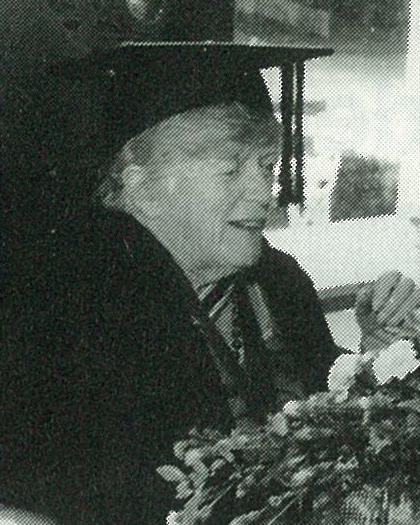
Wallace in June 1991

Julia Nannie Wallace OBE (21 December 1907 – 12 December 1991) was a notable New Zealand teacher, principal, community leader and local politician. She was born in La Crosse, Wisconsin, United States in 1907.

She was the first woman to be elected onto Palmerston North City Council in 1962 and served as a city councillor until 1968. In the 1968 Queen's Birthday Honours, she was appointed an Officer of the Order of the British Empire, in recognition of her service as principal of Palmerston North Girls' High School.

A Ryman Healthcare Retirement Village in Palmerston North has been named after her.
