= 1980 Dunedin mayoral election =

New Zealand mayoral election

- 11 October 1980
- Turnout: 21,744
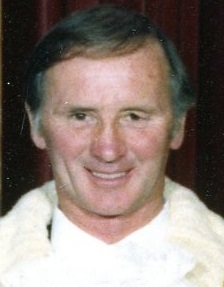

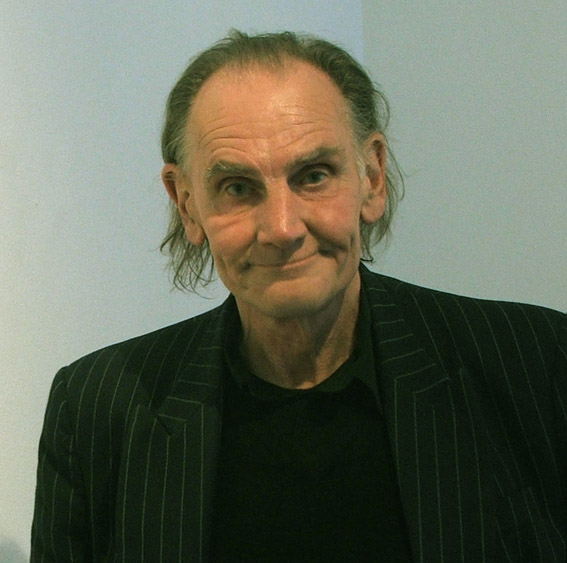
Candidate	Cliff Skeggs	Peter Entwisle
Party	Citizens'	Independent
Popular vote	16,600	4,794
Percentage	76.34	22.04
Mayor before election
Cliff Skeggs
Elected mayor
Cliff Skeggs

The 1980 Dunedin mayoral election was part of the New Zealand local elections held that same year. In 1980, elections were held for the Mayor of Dunedin plus other local government positions including twelve city councillors. The polling was conducted using the standard first-past-the-post electoral method.

== Background ==
Cliff Skeggs was re-elected Mayor of Dunedin with a record majority. The Labour party did not contest the mayoralty for the first time since 1935. As such the contest was marked by low turnout. Skeggs sole opponent was local historian Peter Entwisle who stood only as part of a campaign against the building of an aluminium smelter at Aramoana. The election also saw longtime Labour Party councillor Ethel McMillan defeated in a shock result.

== Results ==
The following table shows the results for the election:

1980 Dunedin mayoral election
Party	Candidate	Votes	%	±%
Citizens'	Cliff Skeggs	16,600	76.34	+31.90
Independent	Peter Entwisle	4,794	22.04	
Informal votes		350	1.60	−0.58
Majority		11,806	54.29	+39.93
Turnout		21,744		
