= 1968 Birthday Honours (New Zealand) =

Awards list for New Zealand

The 1968 Queen's Birthday Honours in New Zealand, celebrating the official birthday of Elizabeth II, were appointments made by the Queen on the advice of the New Zealand government to various orders and honours to reward and highlight good works by New Zealanders. They were announced on 8 June 1968.

The recipients of honours are displayed here as they were styled before their new honour.

== Knight Bachelor ==
- Desmond Henry Todd – of Wellington. For services to commerce, particularly to the motor-vehicle industry.

== Order of Saint Michael and Saint George ==
=== Companion (CMG) ===
- Francis Leo Onion JP – of Te Kowhai. For services to farming.
- Thomas Kay Stuart Sidey – of Dunedin. For services to the community, especially to local government.
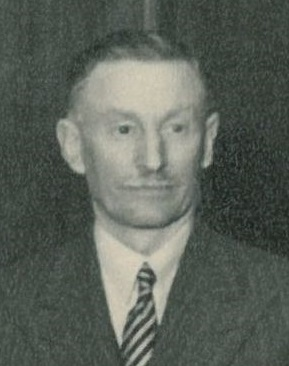
Stuart Sidey

== Order of the British Empire ==
=== Knight Commander (KBE) ===
Civil division

- Hugh John Dyke Acland JP – of South Canterbury. For outstanding services to farming.
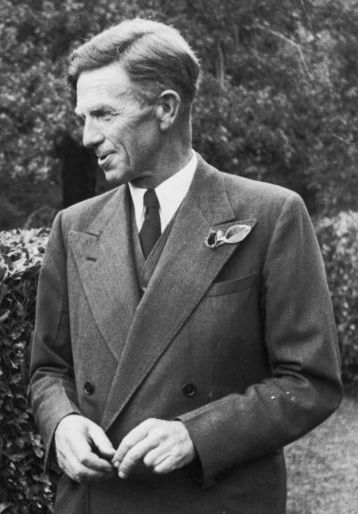
Sir Jack Acland

=== Commander (CBE) ===
Civil division

- Henry Nelson Dollimore – Clerk of the House of Representatives.
- John Lochiel Robson – Secretary for Justice.
- Gordon Drummond Stewart – of Wellington. For services to commerce.
- Athol Umfrey Wells – of Auckland. For services to commerce.

Military division

- Commodore Joffre Paul Sinton Vallant – Royal New Zealand Navy.
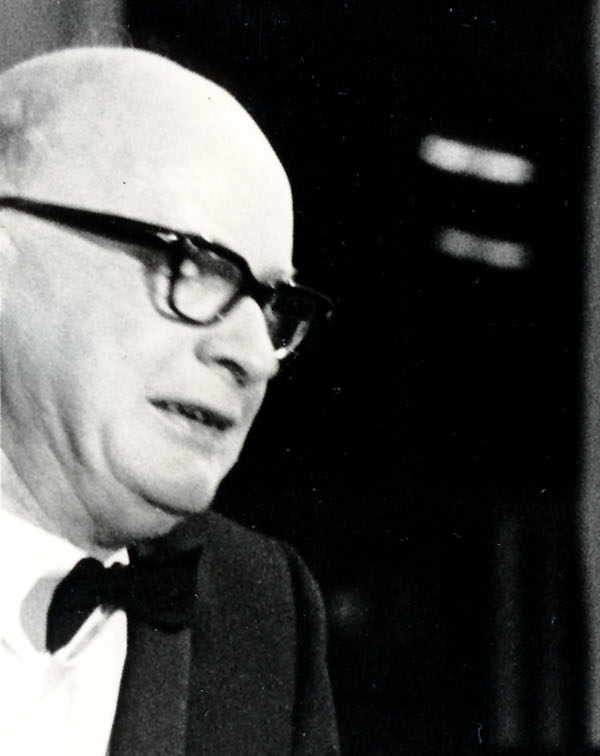
John Robson

=== Officer (OBE) ===
Civil division

- Rabbi Alexander Astor – chief minister of the Auckland Hebrew congregation.
- Hilton James Barrett – of Auckland. For services to the community, particularly to savings banks.
- Herbert Lorraine Boughton – of Waihi Beach. For services to the electrical industry.
- Albert Ronald Guthrey MC – of Christchurch. For services to local government.
- James Brian Lowe MB ChB – of Auckland. For services to medicine.
- Stewart Bell Maclennan – director, National Art Gallery, Wellington.
- Eric Charles Marris – of Wellington. For services to commerce and public affairs.
- George Alfred Nicholls – of Gisborne. For services in the transport industry and aviation.
- Richard Alexander Nimon – chairman, Hawkes Bay County Council.
- Julia Nannie Wallace – principal, Palmerston North Girls' High School.
- Ian Rhys Wills JP – of Southland. For services to farming.

Military division

- Commander William James Lanyon Smith DSO – Royal New Zealand Navy.
- Lieutenant-Colonel Brian Matauru Poananga MBE – Royal New Zealand Infantry Regiment (Regular Force).
- Wing Commander Royden Matthews Jarrett – Royal New Zealand Air Force.
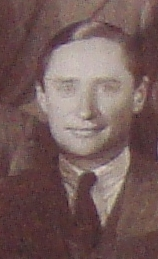
Ron Guthrey

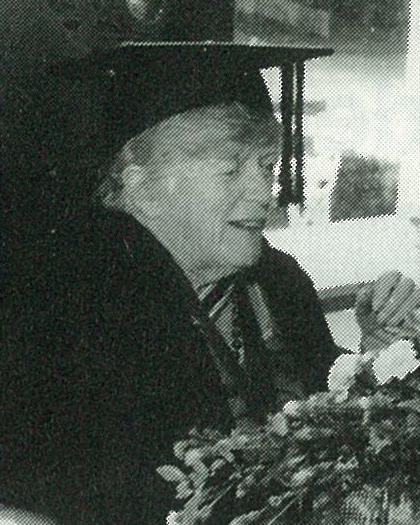
Julia Wallace

=== Member (MBE) ===
Civil division, for gallantry

- John William Reid – of Nelson. For repeated acts of gallantry during rescue operations in circumstances of extreme danger.

Civil division

- Marjorie Henrietta Allan – principal, Hohepa Homes for Handicapped Children, Napier.
- Robert Watson Brown – mayor of Inglewood.
- James Dobson Campbell – of Rarotonga, Cook Islands. For services to scouting.
- William Ferguson Forrester – of Dunedin. For services to the community.
- George Herbert Fox JP – of Alexandra. For services to the community, especially to local government.
- Lewis Casmere Gorman – of Wellington. For services in the Prisons Service.
- Richard John Guerin JP – chairman, Dannevirke County Council.
- Minnie Johnson – of Christchurch. For services to kindergartens.
- Gerald Trevor Lee – of Auckland. For services in the field of music.
- Mona Margaret Livingston – of Waikanae. For services to the community.
- Janet Ruby McMillan – of Dannevirke. For services to the community, particularly to the Red Cross Society.
- John Edmund Marnane – of Hamilton. For services to the community.
- Edwin Purcell Meachen JP – of Blenheim. For services to the community, particularly to local government.
- Beatrice Victoria Palmer – brigadier, Salvation Army. For services to nursing.
- Ivan Edgar Reddish – general secretary, New Zealand Post Office Association.
- Ruiha Roimata Sage JP – of Hamilton. For services to the community, especially to women's and social service organisations.
- Robert Edwin Shortt JP – mayor of Wairoa.
- Peter Wilfred Tapsell MB ChB – of Rotorua. For services to medicine and to the Māori people.
- Lionel Gilbert Thompson JP – of Kaitaia. For services to the community.
- Henry George Warren JP – of Whakatāne. For services to the community, especially to local government.

Military division

- Chaplain Roy Haigh McKenzie – Royal New Zealand Navy.
- Warrant Officer Class II Colin Russell Clements – Royal Regiment of New Zealand Artillery (Territorial Force).
- Warrant Officer Class I William Phillip Morgan – Royal New Zealand Infantry Regiment (Regular Force).
- Captain Neil Macdonald Fraser Officer – Royal New Zealand Army Medical Corps (Regular Force).
- Warrant Officer Class I Eric George Rolle – Royal New Zealand Corps of Signals (Regular Force).
- Major (temporary) Roy Thomas Victor Taylor – Royal New Zealand Infantry Regiment (Regular Force).
- Squadron Leader John Bernard Noonan – Royal New Zealand Air Force.
- Warrant Officer George Robert McDonald – Royal New Zealand Air Force.
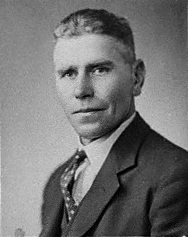
Ted Meachen

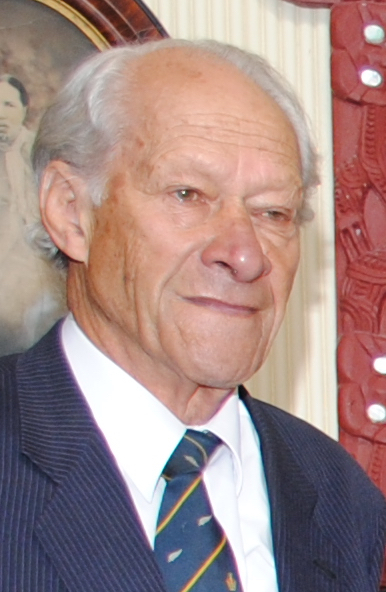
Peter Tapsell

== Companion of the Imperial Service Order (ISO) ==
- Alastair Gordon Couston LRCP LRCS JP – medical superintendent, Seaview Hospital.

== British Empire Medal (BEM) ==
Civil division

- Raymond Joseph Clarke – constable, New Zealand Police.
- Pearl Howard Dawson. For services to women's sport in Auckland, particularly hockey and cricket.
- Mildred Janet Newton Easdale. For services to the community, particularly as official visitor to the Nelson Hospital.
- Kathryn Helen Harris. For services to students in Dunedin.
- John Maurice Henderson – traffic officer. For services to road safety in Dunedin.
- Winifred Agnes Huggins. For services to the community of Auckland.
- Peter Frank McAlpine. For services to scouting.
- Mary Elizabeth Miller. For services to the community of Northland.
- Noel Francis Pachaud. For services to local youth organisations in Rotorua.
- Hanare Morore Piripi – boatman rigger, Marine Department.
- Aileen Mary Stace. For services to the community of Eastbourne, particularly in the encouragement of wool handcrafts.
- Corrie Welsh – lately Plunket nurse, Christchurch.

Military division

- Flight Sergeant Colin George McDowell – Royal New Zealand Air Force.
- Sergeant Patrick John Larter – Royal New Zealand Air Force.
- Sergeant Alexander McKenzie – Royal New Zealand Air Force.

== Royal Red Cross ==
=== Member (RRC) ===
- Kathleen Mary Winks Amon – Royal New Zealand Nursing Corps (Regular Force).

== Air Force Cross (AFC) ==
- Squadron Leader Colin William Rudd – Royal New Zealand Air Force.
- Flight Lieutenant Robert Thomas Reynolds Gilbert – Royal New Zealand Air Force.

== Queen's Police Medal (QPM) ==
- Earnst Royden Trask – superintendent, New Zealand Police Force.
