= 1959 Dunedin mayoral election =

Local election in New Zealand

- 21 November 1959
- Turnout: 23,105 (48.70%)
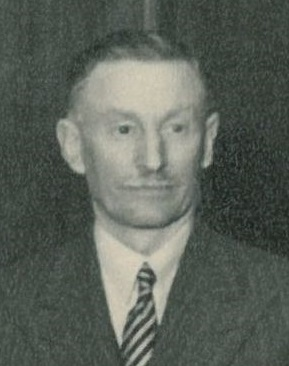

Candidate	Stuart Sidey	Peter John Scott
Party	Citizens'	Labour
Popular vote	12,348	10,561
Percentage	53.44	45.70
Mayor before election
Len Wright
Elected mayor
Stuart Sidey

The 1959 Dunedin mayoral election was part of the New Zealand local elections held that same year. In 1959, elections were held for the Mayor of Dunedin plus other local government positions including twelve city councillors. The polling was conducted using the standard first-past-the-post electoral method.

Len Wright, the incumbent Mayor, declined to run for a fourth term. He was succeeded by councillor Stuart Sidey who defeated the Labour Party candidate Peter John Scott. The Citizens' Association won eight seats on the city council to the Labour Party's four.

== Results ==
The following table shows the results for the election:

1959 Dunedin mayoral election
Party	Candidate	Votes	%	±%
Citizens	Stuart Sidey	12,348	53.44	
Labour	Peter John Scott	10,561	45.70	
Informal votes		196	0.84	
Majority		1,787	7.73	
Turnout		23,105	48.70	−7.10
