= 1986 Dunedin mayoral election =

New Zealand mayoral election

- 11 October 1986
- Turnout: 25,660
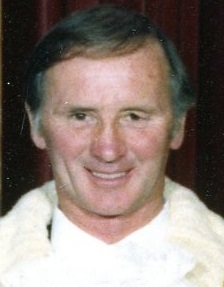

Candidate	Cliff Skeggs	Steve Alexander	Bill Christie
Party	Independent	Labour	Citizens'
Popular vote	12,871	7,064	5,277
Percentage	50.15	27.52	20.56
Mayor before election
Cliff Skeggs
Elected mayor
Cliff Skeggs

The 1986 Dunedin mayoral election was part of the New Zealand local elections held that same year. In 1986, elections were held for the Mayor of Dunedin plus other local government positions, including twelve city councillors. The polling was conducted using the standard first-past-the-post electoral method.

== Background ==
Mayor Cliff Skeggs was re-elected for a record fourth term. Skeggs split from the Citizens' ticket but was re-elected as an independent candidate. Councillor Bill Christie stood as the official Citizens' candidate, polling third, with Labour's Steve Alexander placing second.

Electoral reforms were implemented at the 1986 municipal elections, the method of electing councillors at large which had been used for decades was replaced with a ward system of local electoral districts.

== Results ==
The following table shows the results for the election:

1986 Dunedin mayoral election
Party	Candidate	Votes	%	±%
Independent	Cliff Skeggs	12,871	50.15	−17.03
Labour	Steve Alexander	7,064	27.52	
Citizens'	Bill Christie	5,277	20.56	
Independent	Murray Menzies	269	1.04	−2.69
Informal votes		179	0.69	−0.65
Majority		5,807	22.63	−16.82
Turnout		25,660		

=== Results by ward ===
Cliff Skeggs polled the highest in all four of Dunedin's electoral wards.

Wards won by Skeggs

	Cliff Skeggs		Steve Alexander		Bill Christie		Others		Total
Ward	#	%	#	%	#	%	#	%	#
Central	3,052	51.01	1,620	27.07	1,216	20.32	95	1.58	5,983
East	3,409	51.17	1,793	26.91	1,357	20.37	102	1.53	6,661
North	3,201	44.56	2,268	31.57	1,521	21.17	192	2.67	7,182
West	2,728	56.01	1,163	23.88	932	19.13	47	0.96	4,870
Total	12,871	50.15	7,064	27.52	5,277	20.56	448	1.73	25,660

== Ward results ==
Candidates were also elected from wards to the Dunedin City Council.

Party/ticket	Councillors
Citizens'	7
Labour	4
Independent	1
