= Alexander Astor =

New Zealand rabbi and community leader

Rabbi Alexander Astor OBE

Personal life
- Born: Alexander Ostroff; 11 August 1900 Helsinki, Finland
- Died: 24 June 1988 (aged 87) Wellington, New Zealand

Religious life
- Religion: Judaism

Alexander Astor OBE (11 August 1900 – 24 June 1988) was a New Zealand rabbi and community leader.

In 1953, Astor was awarded the Queen Elizabeth II Coronation Medal. In the 1968 Queen's Birthday Honours, he was appointed an Officer of the Order of the British Empire.
