= Peter Entwisle =

New Zealand art historian

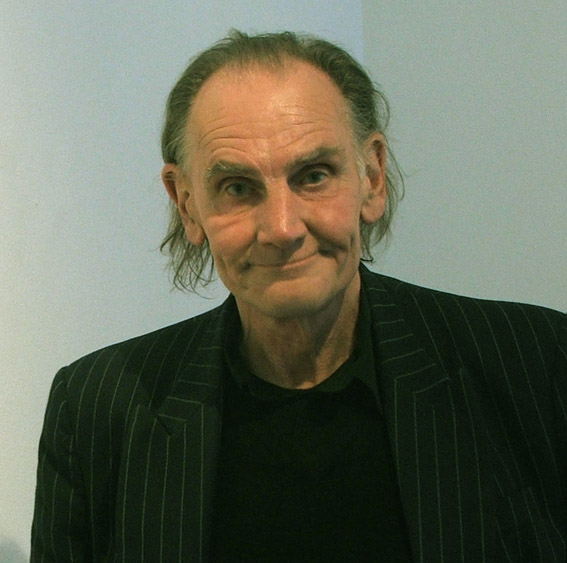
- Entwisle in October 2010
- Born: Peter Malcolm William Entwisle; 20 September 1948; Newmarket, Suffolk, England
- Died: 14 March 2018 (aged 69); Dunedin, New Zealand
- Occupations: Art historian, writer

Peter Malcolm William Entwisle (20 September 1948 – 14 March 2018) was a New Zealand art historian and writer, notably on the history of Dunedin and of New Zealand art.

== Early life ==
Entwisle's parents both worked within the book industry. His father, Arnold, had been born in Cheshire, and moved to London where he worked as a buyer for a bookshop. Here he met Mary Crabb, who worked at Hogarth Press for Leonard Woolf. They married in 1936. After serving in World War II, Arnold got a scholarship to Oxford University, and gained a degree in history.

Peter was born in Newmarket, Suffolk, England in 1948. He had three sisters, Jane, Susan and Sarah. Peter was the third child. In 1952, the family moved to Kuala Lumpur in Malaya, where Arnold worked in the British Colonial Service. The family moved from there to Dunedin in 1955, where Arnold had gained a post as a lecturer at the University of Otago. From a young age, Peter became acquainted with many of the city's top literary and intellectual names, whom his father had become friends with through his university work. These included the circle of poets and artists who surrounded Charles Brasch. It was Brasch who awakened Entwisle's interest in Dunedin's history and architecture.

Peter attended George Street Normal School, Dunedin North Intermediate, and Otago Boys' High School, before enrolling at the University of Otago in 1968. He graduated in 1975 with a BA(Hons) and MLitt in philosophy. While still a student he married Rosemary. He had two daughters, Rebecca and Jennifer.

== Later career ==
Entwisle and his family moved to England in 1976. His initial plans were to complete postgraduate study, but instead he worked as a freelance journalist while acquiring a love for European art. He returned to Dunedin in 1980 where he began work at Dunedin Public Art Gallery, of which he was soon appointed curator, a post he held for 20 years. After 2000, he worked as a freelance writer, and as a regular columnist for the Otago Daily Times. He also became a passionate advocate for Dunedin's built heritage, working as a consultant to the Dunedin City Council's planning department. His written work covered historical and architectural subjects, and also included art criticism. Several of his biographical writings became part of the Dictionary of New Zealand Biography. He also curated a number of art exhibitions.

== Heritage and conservation work ==
Entwisle was involved in the preservation of Dunedin's architectural heritage, and was involved in several campaigns including those against structural changes to the exterior of the Dunedin Municipal Chambers and against the construction of the Forsyth Barr Stadium at University Plaza. He stood for the office of Mayor of Dunedin in 1980 as part of a campaign against the building of an aluminium smelter at Aramoana. He was a member of the New Zealand Historic Places Trust from 1985.

== Death ==
Entwisle died on 14 March 2018 due to illness at his home in central Dunedin.

== Bibliography ==
- William Mathew Hodgkins & his Circle, Dunedin Public Art Gallery, Dunedin, 1984.
- Pavilioned in Splendour: George O’Brien’s Vision of Colonial New Zealand, (with Roger Collins), Dunedin Public Art Gallery, Dunedin, 1986.
- Nerli, (with Michael Dunn and Roger Collins) Dunedin Public Art Gallery, Dunedin, 1988.
- Derek Ball: a Decade of Sculpture, Dunedin Public Art Gallery, Dunedin, 1988.
- Annie Baird: an Exhibition of Recent Works, Dunedin Public Art Gallery, Dunedin, 1989.
- Venus Fly Traps: Nicola Jackson, Dunedin Public Art Gallery, Dunedin, 1990.
- Treasures of the Dunedin Public Art Gallery, Dunedin Public Art Gallery, Dunedin, 1990.
- In Tasman’s Wake: European Art from the Age of Rembrandt to the Land of Colin McCahon, Dunedin Public Art Gallery, Dunedin, 1991.
- Elaine & Other Stories, ESAW Press, Dunedin, 1992. (fiction)
- Behold the Moon: the European Occupation of the Dunedin District 1770–1848, Port Daniel Press, Dunedin, 1998.
- Taka, a Vignette Life of William Tucker 1784–1817, Port Daniel Press, Dunedin, 2005.
