= Gary Robson =

Gary Robson is the name of:

- Gary Robson (darts player) (born 1967), English darts player
- Gary Robson (footballer) (born 1965), English footballer
- Gary D. Robson (born 1958), American author
