= Pearl Dawson =

New Zealand veterinarian, hockey & cricket player, and sports administrator

Pearl Howard Dawson BEM (29 April 1887 – 16 May 1987) was a New Zealand veterinarian, hockey and cricket player, and sports administrator.

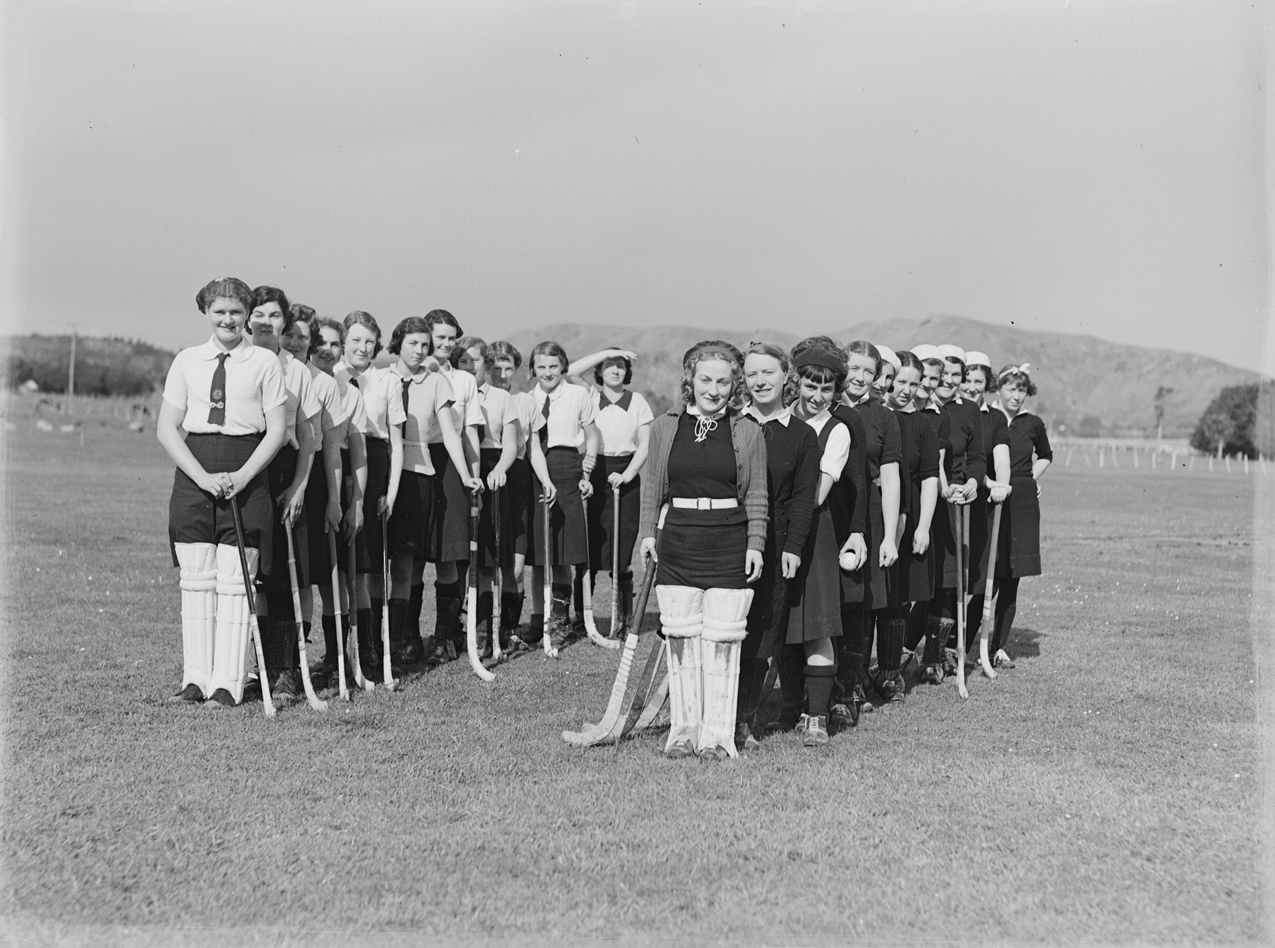
Group of women hockey players, 1939

Dawson was born in Auckland, New Zealand, on 29 April 1887. She attended Wellesley Street Primary School and Auckland Grammar School. She hoped to become a doctor but as her father opposed this she became an apprentice to an Auckland veterinary surgeon. She became the first woman veterinarian in Auckland after getting a diploma. Early in her career she worked with farm animals, but was also an animal inspector for the Auckland Agricultural and Pastoral Association shows and medical officer for the Animal Welfare Association.

Dawson played hockey and was captain of the Auckland side. From 1924 to 1949 she was chair of the Auckland Ladies Hockey Association. The Auckland Hockey Association was male-dominated which caused the women to break away and organise their own sports grounds in Remuera in 1928. The lease on the grounds were not renewed during the Depression and Dawson and others lobbied for a women's sports ground. They were supported by councillor Ellen Melville and Melville Park in Epsom, which was named after her on Dawson's suggestion, became the home for women's sport in Auckland. She was twice president of the New Zealand Women's Hockey Association, and also vice-president of the International Federation of Hockey Associations, the first New Zealander to hold this position.

Dawson also played cricket and in 1928 was one of the founders of the Auckland Girls' Cricket Association. She was its chair from 1932 to 1944, and was at times the Association's president.

In the 1968 Queen's Birthday Honours, Dawson was awarded the British Empire Medal, for services to women's sport in Auckland, particularly hockey and cricket.

Dawson died in Auckland, just after her 100th birthday.
