= Aileen Stace =

New Zealand craftswoman, spinner and spinning teacher

Aileen Mary Stace BEM (1895–1977) was a notable New Zealand craftswoman, spinner and spinning teacher. She was born in Stoney Creek, Manawatu/Horowhenua, New Zealand, in 1895. She founded and organised the Eastbourne Spinners and Weavers, taught people to spin and designed patterns for jerseys to be produced from the wool the group produced.

In the 1968 Queen's Birthday Honours, Stace was awarded the British Empire Medal, for services to the community of Eastbourne, particularly in the encouragement of wool handcrafts.
