= Stewart Maclennan =

New Zealand artist (1903–1973)

Stewart Maclennan OBE

1st Director of the National Art Gallery
- In office 1948–1968
- Succeeded by: Melvin Day

Personal details
- Born: Stewart Bell Maclennan; 14 May 1903 Dunedin, New Zealand
- Died: 6 July 1973 (aged 70)

Stewart Bell Maclennan OBE (14 May 1903 – 6 July 1973) was a New Zealand artist and was a director of the National Art Gallery of New Zealand.

Maclennan was born in Dunedin on 14 May 1903. He received his art training at the Dunedin School of Art and the Royal College of Art, London. In 1922 he attended the Dunedin Training College. In 1946 he became the education officer at the National Art Gallery, and was appointed director two years later. He remained in that role until 1968. He was a member of the Council of the New Zealand Academy of Fine Arts from 1943 to 1949, and vice-president from 1949 to 1959.

In the 1968 Queen's Birthday Honours, Maclennan was appointed an Officer of the Order of the British Empire, in recognition of his service as director of the National Art Gallery.

Maclennan died on 6 July 1973, and his ashes were buried at Mākara Cemetery.
