= Jack Somerville =

New Zealand Presbyterian leader

The Very Reverend Jack Somerville ONZ CMG MC ChStJ
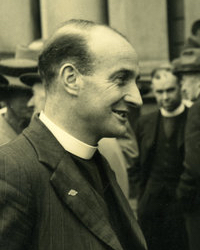
- Somerville in 1948

Moderator of the General Assembly of the Presbyterian Church of New Zealand
- In office 8 November 1960 – 7 November 1961
- Preceded by: Arthur Dowdall Horwell
- Succeeded by: Stuart Cyril Francis

13th Chancellor of the University of Otago
- In office 1976–1982
- Preceded by: Stuart Sidey
- Succeeded by: Jim Valentine

Personal details
- Born: 7 July 1910 Andersons Bay, Dunedin, New Zealand
- Died: 5 October 1999 (aged 89) Dunedin, New Zealand

John Spenser Somerville ONZ CMG MC ChStJ (7 July 1910 – 5 October 1999) was a New Zealand Presbyterian leader.

== Biography ==
Somerville was born in the Dunedin suburb of Andersons Bay in 1910, the son of Grace Isabella (née Isherwood) and James Cleland Hall Somerville. He attended the University of Otago, graduating with a Master of Arts degree with second class honours in 1935. From 1935 to 1937 he trained at the Theological Hall of the Presbyterian Church of New Zealand at Knox College, at the end of which time he received his certificate of license. He then travelled to the United Kingdom, where he studied at Westminster College, Cambridge and the University of St Andrews. He returned to New Zealand in 1938 to become the minister at Tapanui.

During World War II, Somerville served as a chaplain with the New Zealand forces from 1942 to 1945, first in Egypt and then in Italy. In 1945, he was awarded the Military Cross. After the war, he returned to Tapanui, and then moved to the Wellington parish of St Andrew's-on-the-Terrace, where he served from 1947 to 1963. Somerville was Moderator of the General Assembly of New Zealand in 1960–61.

Returning to his home town of Dunedin, Somerville was Master of Knox College from 1964 to 1978. He was first elected to the University of Otago Council in 1969 and from 1976 to 1982 he served as chancellor of the university.

He died in Dunedin on 5 October 1999 and his ashes were buried in Andersons Bay Cemetery with those of his parents. A commemorative bench outside the chapel on Quarantine Island with the inscription, 'Psalm 139 v 9-10,' was placed by his family.

== Honours ==
In 1955 Somerville was appointed a Serving Brother of the Venerable Order of Saint John and in 1958 he was promoted to Chaplain of that order. In the 1978 New Year Honours, Somerville was appointed a Companion of the Order of St Michael and St George, for services to the Presbyterian Church and the University of Otago. In the 1991 Queen's Birthday Honours, he was appointed a Member of the Order of New Zealand.

Academic offices
Preceded by Stuart Sidey	Chancellor of the University of Otago; 1976–1982	Succeeded by Jim Valentine
