= Robson (footballer, born 1959) =

Brazilian footballer

Personal information
- Full name: Robson Caetano Duarte
- Date of birth: 8 February 1959 (age 67)
- Place of birth: Belo Horizonte, Brazil
- Height: 1.69 m (5 ft 7 in)
- Position: Forward

Senior career*
Years	Team	Apps	(Gls)
1980–1981	Galícia		
1981	Paysandu		
1982–1985	Bahia		
1985–1988	Cruzeiro	205	(36)
1989	Goiás		
1990–1991	Novorizontino		
1992–1994	América Mineiro		
1995–1996	Villa Nova		
- * Club domestic league appearances and goals as of 29 February 2024

Robson Caetano Duarte (born 8 February 1959), simply known as Robson, is a Brazilian former professional footballer who played as a forward.

== Career ==
Versatile and capable of playing in several attacking positions, Robson began his career at Galicia. He also played for Paysandu before arriving at Bahia, where he was state champion in 1982, 1983 and 1984. In 1985 he moved to Cruzeiro, where he played 205 matches and scored 36 goals, being state champion in 1987 scoring the decisive goal against Atlético Mineiro. He was champion again for Goiás in 1989 and runner-up in the 1990 Campeonato Paulista for Novorizontino, in the "hillbilly final" against Bragantino. He would still become champion in 1993 with América, repeating his successful duo with Hamilton, with whom he founded a football school after retiring.

== Honours ==
Bahia

- Campeonato Baiano: 1982, 1983, 1984

Cruzeiro

- Campeonato Mineiro: 1987

Goiás

- Campeonato Goiano: 1989

América

- Campeonato Mineiro: 1993
