= Matthew Robson (rugby union) =

England international rugby union player

- Born: 16 December 1908 Bellingham, England
- Died: 30 November 1983 (aged 74) Edinburgh, Scotland

Rugby union career
- Position: Centre
International career
Years	Team	Apps	(Points)
1930	England	4	(3)

Matthew Robson (16 December 1908 – 30 November 1983) was an English international rugby union player.

A centre three-quarter, Robson represented Northumberland and was an Oxford blue. He starred for Oxford University in the 1929 Varsity Match with a try and drop goal, to help secure their first title for five years.

Robson gained four England caps in the 1930 Five Nations Championship and scored a try in their win over France. His career was then put on hold as he took up a position in Nigeria with the Forestry Service.

== See also ==
- List of England national rugby union players
