= Charles Robson =

Charles Robson may refer to:

- Charles Robson (cricketer) (1859–1943), English cricketer and manager of Southampton F.C.
- Charles Robson (RAF officer) (1895–?), British World War I flying ace
