= Hugh Robson =

Hugh Robson may refer to:

- Hugh Robson (politician) (1871–1945), Canadian politician and judge in Manitoba
- Hugh Robson (bowls) (1918–1996), New Zealand lawn bowls competitor
- Hugh Robson (educator) (1917–1977), Scottish Vice-Chancellor of the University of Sheffield and Principal of the University of Edinburgh
