= Bert Robson =

English footballer

Personal information
- Full name: Albert Proud Robson
- Date of birth: 14 November 1916
- Place of birth: Crook, England
- Date of death: January 1990 (aged 73)
- Place of death: Croydon, England
- Height: 5 ft 8 1/2 in (1.74 m)
- Position: Centre forward

Youth career
- –1934: Godalming

Senior career*
Years	Team	Apps	(Gls)
1934–1948	Crystal Palace	85	(22)
1948–1949	Tonbridge Angels	51	(27)
1949–1951	Guildford City		
1951	Margate		
- * Club domestic league appearances and goals

Albert Proud Robson (14 November 1916 – January 1990) was an English professional footballer who played in the Football League for Crystal Palace as a centre forward.
