= Save Aramoana Campaign =

Campaign

The Save Aramoana Campaign was formed in 1974 to oppose a proposed aluminium smelter at Aramoana in New Zealand.

In the late 1970s Aramoana was proposed as the site of a major aluminium smelter by a consortium of New Zealand–based Fletcher-Challenge, Australia's CSR Limited and Swiss firm Alusuisse. An aluminium smelter was already operating at Tiwai Point when the smelter at Aramoana was proposed.

== Background ==
From its inception, the Otago Harbour Board had vested in it for harbour purposes, land on the northern side of the Otago Harbour entrance. This included a quarry for rock to build the mole that protected the entrance; the village, originally housing workers on the mole, and later leased out for holiday homes; a large area of salt marsh; and adjacent dry-land leased out for rough grazing.

After the Comalco Aluminium Smelter was opened at Bluff's Tiwai Point in 1971, Otago interests sought a similar project in 1974 on the OHB land at Aramoana. It was not well founded, and was withdrawn in the face of modest opposition.

That opposition remained alert to any unusual activity on the OHB land, and when surveyors were seen on the flats over the summer of 1979-80 conservation interests began to organize what became the Save Aramoana Campaign.

At the time the site was included in the Waikouaiti District Scheme, under zoning provisions of dubious legality and which a planner/economist with the campaign took to court for a declaratory judgment as to their legality. This had the effect of placing the whole project sub judice, and therefore unable to proceed. It cost $50.00 to lodge that action with the court, and when it became clear that the project would not be able to quietly proceed under the existing rules, the entire campaign for and against the smelter was thrust into the public arena.

The Government, keen to use the smelter to justify the Clyde Dam as part of its "Think Big" programme, passed the National Development Act. Waikouaiti, now combined with Taieri to become the Silverpeaks, brought out its own district scheme with much more legally sound provisions for industrial land use, specifically a smelter, at Aramoana. Those provisions were fought by the campaign's planner at the council level and on to the Planning Tribunal as Appeal no. 733/82, upheld by that court in decision C51/83 J.Todd and the Careys Bay Assn. v Silver Peaks County Council. The Court directed that " ... all reference to industrial development at Aramoana is to be deleted ... ".

While the planning and legal battles were being fought the broader field saw the campaign kept on the public stage : the declaration of the Independent State of Aramoana allowed that notional entity to issue a collector's set of stamps. with original art work donated by leading New Zealand artists for the purpose, and these raised nearly NZ$500,000 in 1982 terms. The campaign was remarkably well funded. Several New Zealand artists were involved in the campaign in other ways, most notably Ralph Hotere, who produced the Aramoana series of paintings in response to the smelter issue.

The public campaign also ensured that Government could not lightly face the serious political risk of bringing down a special Empowering Act to force the smelter through, as it had done with the Clyde High Dam. The tide had turned against Think Big, and the smelter was left to sink without trace. Pechiney had left, Alusuisse went off to look for a more congenial site in Zaire, and Aramoana saw the village made freehold and the saltmarsh gazetted as a reserve.

== Independent State of Aramoana ==
Independent State of Aramoana
- Micronation (unrecognised entity)
- Stamps issued in 1981 by Aramoana to raise funds for the anti-smelter campaign. The design was based on the painting "Puketotara, Twice Shy" by New Zealand regionalist artist, Don Binney.
- Area claimed: Aramoana and Te Ngaru villages, South Island, New Zealand
- Claimed by: Village residents
- Dates claimed: December 23, 1980–after October 1981

The smelter plan called for the destruction of the villages of Aramoana and Te Ngaru, and also threatened a local wildlife reserve. In response residents of the area announced their secession from New Zealand on 23 December 1980, established a "border post" and "travelling embassy", printed passports, citizenship certificates and postage stamps, and set about using the resultant publicity to build a national grassroots campaign in opposition to the smelter. The campaign attracted the attention of artists such as Ralph Hotere, as well as conservationists and heritage researchers such as Peter Entwisle.

The consortium was endorsed by the New Zealand Government, which initially proposed to subsidise the cost of electricity required for the smelter's operation, leading to fears that the wider population of New Zealand would be faced with significant electricity price hikes in the longer term. However, the campaign waged by the independent state supporters eventually forced a government backdown, calling into question the economic viability of the project.

This development combined with declining aluminium prices on world commodity markets, eventually led to the withdrawal of Alusuisse from the consortium in October, 1981. The remaining partners failed to secure additional investment capital, and eventually abandoned the project, paving the way for the peaceful reintegration of the Independent State of Aramoana back into New Zealand. The proposal is still remembered as a divisive issue.

== See also ==
- Environment of New Zealand
- List of micronations
