= Michael Connelly (New Zealand politician) =

New Zealand trade unionist and politician

The Honourable Michael Connelly CBE
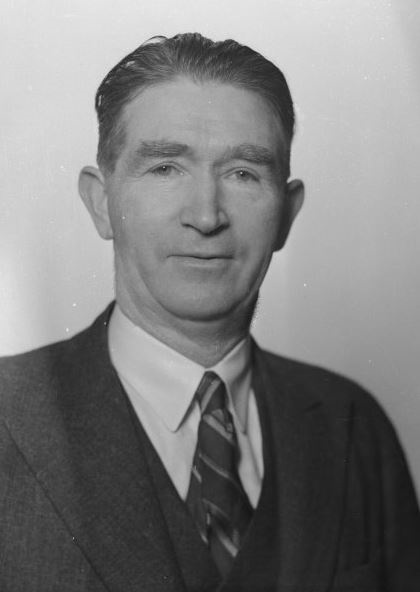

Member of the Legislative Council
- In office 9 March 1936 – 8 March 1950
- Appointed by: Michael Joseph Savage

Personal details
- Born: 29 April 1887 Kakaramea, New Zealand
- Died: 30 October 1970 (aged 83) Christchurch, New Zealand
- Party: Labour Party
- Relations: Mick Connelly (son)
- Children: 5

Michael Connelly CBE (29 April 1887 – 30 October 1970) was a New Zealand trade unionist, politician of the Labour Party, and a Member of the Legislative Council (upper house) from 1936 to 1950.

== Biography ==
=== Early life and career ===
Connelly was born in Kakaramea in 1887 where his father was a farmer. Early in his life, they moved to the West Coast and gained work as a coal miner. He joined the trade union movement and was elected an executive member of the Paparoa Miners' Union. In 1911 he moved to Wellington to work for the New Zealand Railways Department. Subsequently, he was active in the Amalgamated Society of Railway Servants as Secretary of the Thorndon (Wellington) branch 1914–18, Greymouth branch 1920–21, and national president 1923–25.

He was a director of the Grey River Argus, the first following it becoming a Labour Party newspaper. He was a member of first the Westland and later Wellington Labour Representation Committee.

=== Political career ===
Connelly unsuccessfully contested the Port Chalmers parliamentary electorate in 1925 against James Dickson. He sought the nomination as the Labour candidate again for the 1935 election but was beaten by Norman Hartley Campbell. When Campbell died in February 1935 following an operation the Labour Party hierarchy wanted to endorse Connolly as the candidate. However, there was resentment from local party members and a new ballot was held, which was won by Campbell's brother Archie.

He was still a railway officer (i.e. a civil servant) when he was appointed to the Legislative Council on 9 March 1936 by the first Labour Government, hence a special act, the Michael Connelly Appointment Validation Act 1936 (technically a private act) had to be passed to validate his appointment. His term ended on 8 March 1943, and he was reappointed the following day for another seven years. When his second term ended on 8 March 1950, the first National Government was in power and he was not reappointed. From 1948 until the end of his term in 1950, he was Chairman of Committees of the Legislative Council. He later sought the Labour nomination at the 1953 North Dunedin by-election but was not selected.

He was a Dunedin City Councillor 1944–1947 and 1950–1959. He was chairman of the council's water committee. He unsuccessfully contested the Dunedin mayoralty in 1956, losing to Citizens candidate Len Wright. He was chairman of the Otago League of Local Bodies and also an executive member the South Island Local Bodies Association. From 1947 to 1959 he was president of the Dunedin Savings Bank and was also president of the Associated Savings Banks of New Zealand.

He was also a member of the Dunedin Regional Planning Authority and on the board of the Otago Museums Trust. In 1953, he was awarded the Queen Elizabeth II Coronation Medal.

=== Later life and death ===
In the 1960 Queen's Birthday Honours, Connelly was appointed a Commander of the Order of the British Empire, for services in the field of local government.

Connelly died in Christchurch on 30 October 1970 and was buried at Andersons Bay Cemetery, Dunedin. He was survived by his three daughters and two sons, his wife having predeceased him.

His son, Mick Connelly, was a Labour Party MP and cabinet minister. Another son, G. J. Connelly, was New Zealand's Deputy Controller and Auditor-General of New Zealand.

== Notes ==
Political offices
| Preceded by Bernard Martin | Chairman of Committees of the Legislative Council; 1948–1950 | Succeeded by Tom Bloodworth |
