= Gary Robson (footballer) =

English footballer and manager

Personal information
- Date of birth: 6 July 1965 (age 61)
- Place of birth: Chester-le-Street, County Durham, England
- Height: 5 ft 5 in (1.65 m)
- Position: Midfielder

Youth career
- –1982: West Bromwich Albion

Senior career*
Years	Team	Apps	(Gls)
1982–1993	West Bromwich Albion	218	(28)
1993–1996	Bradford City	75	(3)
1996–1998	Gateshead	60	(2)
Total		353	(33)
- * Club domestic league appearances and goals

Gary Robson (born 6 July 1965) is an English former professional footballer who played as a midfielder. Born in Chester-le-Street, County Durham, he played in the Football League between 1982 and 1996 for West Bromwich Albion and Bradford City, making nearly 300 league appearances.

Robson later played non-league football for Gateshead alongside brother Justin Robson. He went on to become Caretaker Manager of Gateshead, leaving the club after relegation. His other brother is former England captain Bryan Robson.
