= William Robson (footballer) =

English footballer

Personal information
- Full name: William Robson
- Position: Centre forward

Senior career*
| Years | Team | Apps | (Gls) |
| 1895 | Crewe Alexandra | 2 | (1) |
- * Club domestic league appearances and goals

William Robson was an English footballer who played as centre forward for Crewe Alexandra in the Football League in 1895.
