= Matt Robson (footballer, born 1887) =

English footballer

Personal information
- Full name: Matthew Henry Robson
- Date of birth: 1887
- Place of birth: Gateshead, England
- Height: 5 ft 10 1/2 in (1.79 m)
- Position: Wing half

Senior career*
| Years | Team | Apps | (Gls) |
- Washington United
- Wallsend Park Villa
| 1909–1916 | Lincoln City (Note: Infobox stats exclude appearances in the 1911–12 season in the Central League. The free-to-access section of the Lincoln City FC Archive does not separate appearances in leagues other than the Football League from "other" appearances.) | 121 | (3) |
- Scunthorpe & Lindsey United
- Boston Town
- * Club domestic league appearances and goals

Matthew Henry Robson (1887 – c. 1919) was an English professional footballer who made 121 appearances in the Football League playing for Lincoln City. He played as a wing half.

Robson was born in Eighton Banks, Gateshead, which was then in County Durham. He began his football career with Washington United and Wallsend Park Villa in his native north-east of England, before joining Football League Second Division club Lincoln City. He made his debut in a goalless draw at home to Grimsby Town in September 1909, and remained with the club until World War I interrupted competitive football. After the war, he played for Scunthorpe & Lindsey United and Boston Town.
