= John Robson (Australian footballer) =

Australian rules footballer

Personal information
- Full name: John Robson
- Born: 12 July 1933
- Died: 25 February 2011 (aged 77)
- Original team: New Town
- Height: 189 cm (6 ft 2 in)
- Weight: 87 kg (192 lb)

Playing career^{1}
Years	Club	Games (Goals)
1955	Richmond	6 (4)
1956	St Kilda	4 (0)
Total		10 (4)
- ^{1} Playing statistics correct to the end of 1956.

John Robson (12 July 1933 – 25 February 2011) was a former Australian rules footballer who played with Richmond and St Kilda in the Victorian Football League (VFL).
