= William Robson (1843–1920) =

Australian politician

William Robson (21 December 1843 – 25 October 1920) was an Australian politician.

He was born in Newcastle to mine manager William Robson and Annie Veitch. He was educated at East Maitland and Wollongong and worked in a coal office before becoming a Methodist minister. He preached at Young, Braidwood, Waratah and Morpeth before leaving the ministry around 1879. On 17 March 1868 he had married Annie Robertson, with whom he had three children; one of them, also called William, continued the family's political tradition. He then worked for the colonial architects' office until 1885, eventually becoming a public accountant in 1895. In 1900 he was appointed to the New South Wales Legislative Council as a Protectionist. He was a Member of Council of Newington College from 1898 until 1920 and was a lay preacher and strong advocate of union of the Methodist churches. He remained in the council until his death in 1920 at Wollongong.
