= John Robson (public servant) =

New Zealand public servant and penal reformer (1909–1993)

John Robson CBE
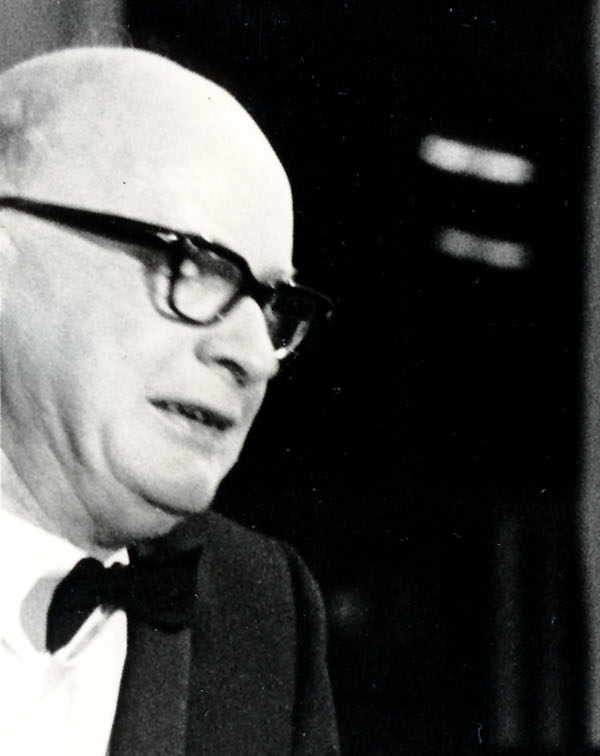
- Robson, c. 1970

Secretary for Justice
- In office 1960–1969
- Preceded by: Samuel Thompson Barnett
- Succeeded by: Eric Alderson Missen

Personal details
- Born: John Lochiel Robson; 4 June 1909 Halcombe, New Zealand
- Died: 17 September 1993 (aged 84) Wellington, New Zealand
- Spouse: Katharine Enid Hoby (m. 1942)
- Children: 4
- Occupation: Public servant
- Known for: Penal reform

Academic background
- Education: University College London
- Thesis: Comparative study of the law affecting corporate trustees in the United States of America, New Zealand and England (1939)

John Lochiel Robson CBE (4 June 1909 – 17 September 1993) was a New Zealand senior public servant and penal reformer.

== Biography ==
Robson was born in Halcombe, Manawatu, New Zealand in 1909. He graduated Master of Laws from Canterbury University College in 1931, and Doctor of Philosophy (law) from University of London in 1939. Returning to New Zealand, he rose through the public service, serving as Secretary for Justice from 1960 to 1969, where he pursued a progressive penal policy. He also had substantial impact on the Indecent Publications Act 1963.

After his retirement, Robson founded the Institute of Criminology at Victoria University of Wellington.

In 1936, Robson was a founding member of New Zealand Institute of Public Administration, and served as its president between 1954 and 1955. From 1981 to 1988, he was the patron of the Mental Health Foundation of New Zealand.

== Honours and awards ==
In the 1968 Queen's Birthday Honours, Robson was appointed a Commander of the Order of the British Empire, in recognition of his service as Secretary of Justice. The following year he was conferred with an honorary Doctor of Laws degree by the University of Otago. In 1977, he was awarded the Queen Elizabeth II Silver Jubilee Medal.
