= Matt Robson (footballer, born 1954) =

English footballer

Personal information
- Full name: Matthew Robson
- Date of birth: 29 December 1954 (age 71)
- Place of birth: Easington, England
- Position: Centre half

Youth career
- 19??–1972: Sunderland

Senior career*
Years	Team	Apps	(Gls)
1972–197?	Sunderland	0	(0)
1975	→ Darlington (loan)	1	(0)
- * Club domestic league appearances and goals

Matthew Robson (born 29 December 1954) is an English former footballer who played as a centre half in the Football League for Darlington.

Robson was born in Easington, County Durham. He began his football career as an apprentice with Sunderland, but never played for their first team. In March 1975, he joined Darlington on loan. He made just one appearance, on 29 March, starting at centre half in a 2–1 defeat away to Crewe Alexandra in the Fourth Division.
