= Doug Robson =

English footballer (1942–2020)

Personal information
- Full name: John Douglas Robson
- Date of birth: 20 July 1942
- Place of birth: Washington, England
- Date of death: 23 April 2020 (aged 77)
- Position: Centre half

Senior career*
Years	Team	Apps	(Gls)
1962–1965	Darlington	33	(0)
1965–196?	Gateshead		
196?–19??	Horden Colliery Welfare		
- * Club domestic league appearances and goals

John Douglas Robson (20 July 1942 – 23 April 2020) was an English footballer who made 33 appearances in the Football League playing as a centre half for Darlington in the 1960s. He also played non-League football for Gateshead and Horden Colliery Welfare.
