= William B. P. Robson =

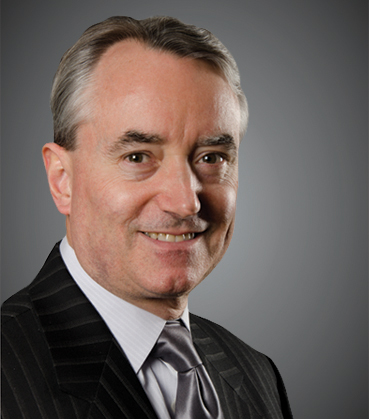
- William B. P. Robson, President and CEO, C.D. Howe Institute
- Born: 1959 (age 66–67)

Academic background
- Education: Carleton University

William Bertie Provost Robson (born 1959) is president and CEO of the C.D. Howe Institute.

Robson took office as president and CEO of the C.D. Howe Institute in July 2006, after serving as the institute's senior vice president since 2003 and director of research since 2000. He has written more than 200 monographs, articles, chapters and books on such subjects as government budgets, pensions, healthcare financing, inflation and currency issues. His work has won awards from the Policy Research Secretariat, the Canadian Economics Association, and the Donner Canadian Foundation.

Robson lectured on public finance and public policy at the University of Toronto from 2000 to 2003; he currently lectures in public finance at the Munk School of Global Affairs & Public Policy. He is a senior fellow at Massey College, holds an ICD.D designation from the Institute of Corporate Directors, and is a member of the Big Picture Panel on the CBC's Lang and O'Leary Exchange.

Robson was a guest at Joseph Oliver's annual policy retreat in Wakefield Quebec.
