= Russell Calvert =

New Zealand politician

Russell Calvert JP
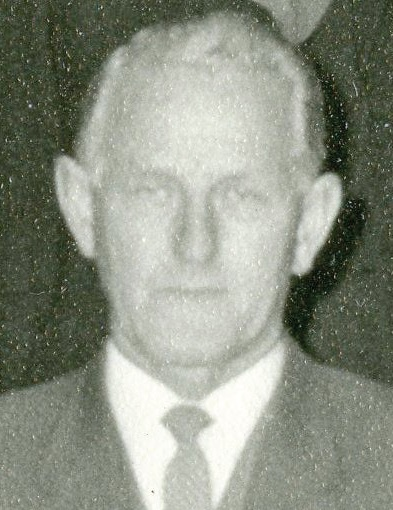

51st Mayor of Dunedin
- In office 9 October 1965 – 12 October 1968
- Deputy: Jim Barnes
- Preceded by: Stuart Sidey
- Succeeded by: Jim Barnes

Personal details
- Born: 1 February 1909 Masterton, New Zealand
- Died: 20 August 2011 (aged 102) Nelson, New Zealand
- Party: Labour
- Spouse: Eileen Henriette Calvert (died 1977)
- Profession: Dentist

Russell John Calvert JP (1 February 1909 – 20 August 2011) was a New Zealand local-body politician. He served as Mayor of Dunedin between 1965 and 1968.

== Biography ==
=== Early life ===
Calvert was born in Masterton in 1909. He was educated at Nelson College in 1923 and in Wellington. Calvert had wanted to join the Merchant Navy, but was unable to fund the £50 necessary for officers training as a captain, so instead he started work with his uncle as a dental technician in Wellington. He then moved to Dunedin and established his own dental technician's laboratory there, living in Dunedin for 52 years. He served in World War II in the army in an artillery unit in Greece and the Middle East, and for a short time in New Caledonia.

=== Political career ===
In Dunedin he became involved in local-body affairs in the late-1940s as a member of the Kew Ratepayers and Householders Association. He was later an organiser of the Dunedin Combined Ratepayers' Association and was part of a successful campaign in 1953 for unimproved value rating.

He later sought the Labour nomination at the 1953 North Dunedin by-election but was not selected. He was first elected to the Dunedin City Council in a 1958 by-election, beating former National MP Jim Barnes, to replace Fred Jones who had been appointed New Zealand's High Commissioner to Australia. At the regularly scheduled election in 1959 he was initially successful in securing re-election, as the lowest polling successful candidate, just 11 votes ahead of the next candidate Edgar Whittleston. After the official count was finished, which included an extra 1,570 special votes, it changed the result slightly with Whittleston displacing Calvert as the lowest polling successful candidate by 93 votes.

He returned to the council in another by-election in July 1961 and then stood unsuccessfully for mayor in 1962. His mayoral candidature was last minute, with Phil Connolly the MP for Dunedin Central initially set to be Labour's mayoral candidate. However when Connolly was forced to withdraw on grounds of ill-health Clavert replaced him, narrowly losing to the incumbent Mayor Stuart Sidey. He stood for the city council as well as the mayoralty and was comfortably re-elected to the council (polling second highest). Three years later he stood for the mayoralty again, this time beating Sidey. He served for one term as mayor from 1965 to 1968 when he was defeated by Jim Barnes. He was then re-elected to the council mid-term in a 1970 by-election before standing for mayor unsuccessfully one last time in 1971.

He was the chairman of many committees and on a number of executive boards during his career, including being chairman of the Clutha Valley Development Commission, looking at hydro-electric power development in the area. He also was on the Town and Country Planning Appeal Board for four terms.

=== Later life and death ===
His first wife, Eileen, died in 1977 and Calvert then lived for three years in Arrowtown at the family holiday home where he worked at the local golf club as unofficial and unpaid assistant greenkeeper. Together with his second wife, Win, he moved to first Christchurch and then Nelson to be nearer to her family.

In later life he was a leading campaigner for higher pensions for those with spouses in care. After presenting a petition to parliament in 2005, signed by 1,519 people, Senior Citizens Minister Ruth Dyson announced all married pensioners who had a partner in long-term residential care would from July 2006 be eligible for the higher single rate of superannuation.

He died in 2011 aged 102.

== Notes ==
Political offices
Preceded by Stuart Sidey	Mayor of Dunedin; 1965–1968	Succeeded by Jim Barnes
