= Cliff Skeggs =

New Zealand businessman and mayor of Dunedin (1931–2025)

Sir Cliff Skeggs
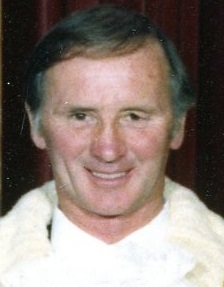
- Skeggs, c. 1980

53rd Mayor of Dunedin
- In office 1977–1989
- Preceded by: Jim Barnes
- Succeeded by: Richard Walls

Personal details
- Born: Clifford George Skeggs; 19 March 1931 Bluff, New Zealand
- Died: 12 June 2025 (aged 94)
- Spouse: Marie Ledgerwood (m. 1951)
- Children: 3
- Education: Southland Technical College

Sir Clifford George Skeggs JP (19 March 1931 – 12 June 2025) was a New Zealand businessman and local politician. He served as mayor of Dunedin from 1977 to 1989.

== Early life and family ==
Skeggs was born in Bluff, and was educated at Bluff School and Southland Technical College. He married Marie Ledgerwood in 1951, and they went on to have three sons.

== Business career ==
Skeggs was involved in the fishing industry from 1953, and developed the Skeggs Group of which he was the chairman and chief executive into what was the largest private inshore fishing fleet in New Zealand with investments including shipping, aviation (Pacifica Air) and property.

== Political career ==
Skeggs was on the Dunedin City Council and Otago Harbour Board, and later was chairman of the port company Port Otago. He was mayor of Dunedin from 1977 to 1989.

== Death ==
Skeggs died on 12 June 2025, at the age of 94.

== Honours and awards ==
In the 1987 Queen's Birthday Honours, Skeggs was appointed a Knight Bachelor, in recognition of his service as the mayor of Dunedin. In 2000, he was inducted into the New Zealand Business Hall of Fame.

Political offices
Preceded by Jim Barnes	Mayor of Dunedin; 1977–1989	Succeeded by Richard Walls
