= Jim Barnes (politician) =

New Zealand politician

Sir James Barnes MBE CStJ
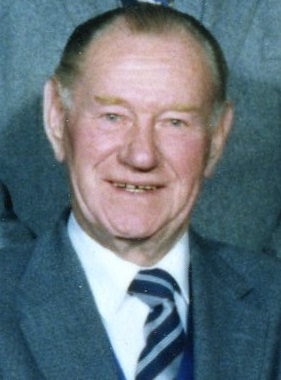
- Barnes c. 1980

52nd Mayor of Dunedin
- In office 1968–1977
- Preceded by: Russell Calvert
- Succeeded by: Cliff Skeggs

Member of the New Zealand Parliament for St Kilda
- In office 1951–1954
- Preceded by: Fred Jones
- Succeeded by: Bill Fraser

Personal details
- Born: James George Barnes; 24 September 1908 Dunedin, New Zealand
- Died: 6 June 1995 (aged 86) Dunedin, New Zealand
- Party: National
- Spouse: Elsie Mabel Clark (m. 1938)
- Children: One daughter

Military service
- Allegiance: Royal New Zealand Air Force
- Branch/service: No. 75 (NZ)
- Years of service: 1940–1946
- Battles/wars: World War II

Sir James George Barnes MBE CStJ (24 September 1908 – 6 June 1995) was a New Zealand politician of the National Party.

== Early life and family ==
Barnes was born in Dunedin on 24 September 1908, and was educated at Andersons Bay School, and then King Edward Technical College from 1919 to 1921. In 1938, he married Elsie Mabel Clark, and the couple went on to have one child.

== Military service ==
Barnes joined the Royal New Zealand Air Force in 1940, and trained in Canada. He qualified as a navigator and bomb aimer, and joined the No. 75 (NZ) Squadron. In 1942, Barnes was shot down over France, and spent three years in German prisoner-of-war camps. He put pressure on German resources helping fellow prisoners escape, and received various punishments, including a sentencing to be shot, though later the camp brutality eased, and Barnes was not executed. In 1945, Barnes was appointed a Member of the Order of the British Empire (Military Division), for distinguished service while a prisoner-of-war.

== Athletics career ==
=== Competitor ===
Barnes was a noted athlete at the national level. He won the New Zealand men's senior cross-country title in 1932, and the national men's one mile championship in 1933, recording a time of 4:24.4 in the latter event.

=== Official ===
Later, Barnes was active as an official and leader of Otago Athletics, and was particularly supportive of women's athletics. His name has become enshrined in the Otago harrier programme in the J.G. Barnes cross-country race, first held in the early 1950s in the Chisholm Park area of Dunedin.

Barnes was the New Zealand athletics team manager at the 1950 British Empire Games in Auckland, and assistant manager for the New Zealand team at the 1956 Summer Olympics in Melbourne. He served as president of the New Zealand Amateur Athletic Association, and was a life member of the Otago Amateur Athletic Association.

== Political career ==
New Zealand Parliament
Years	Term	Electorate	Party
1951–1954	30th	St Kilda	National
1954–1957	31st	St Kilda	National

A member of the National Party, Barnes represented the St Kilda electorate from 1951, when he defeated Fred Jones until 1957, and 1960, when he was twice defeated by Bill Fraser. He served as National's junior whip during the Holland administration.

From 1968 to 1977, Barnes served as mayor of Dunedin. He had been on the Dunedin City Council from 1947, and deputy mayor from 1959.

In the 1976 Queen's Birthday Honours, Barnes was appointed a Knight Bachelor, in recognition of his service as mayor of Dunedin.

== Other activities ==
Barnes served as president of both the New Zealand Trotting Conference and the Australasian Trotting Council, and he was a life member of the Forbury Park Trotting Club in Dunedin. He was an executive member of the Order of St John, and in 1980 he was appointed a Commander of the Order of St John.

For 14 years, Barnes served as president of the Shipwreck Relief Society of New Zealand, and he was a life member of the Caledonian Society of New Zealand. He was a trustee of the Otago Savings Bank for 25 years, including four terms as president, and served on the University of Otago Council for 10 years.

In 1953, Barnes was awarded the Queen Elizabeth II Coronation Medal, and in 1977 he received the Queen Elizabeth II Silver Jubilee Medal. In 1990, he was awarded the New Zealand 1990 Commemoration Medal.

== Death and legacy ==
Barnes died in Dunedin on 6 June 1995. His wife, Elsie, Lady Barnes, died in 2015, aged 100.

The Sir James Barnes Memorial Lookout is located between Forbury Park and the dunes of Saint Kilda Beach (at 45°54′35.6″S 170°29′45.3″E), and commands a view across the southern part of Dunedin.

Political offices
Preceded by Russell Calvert	Mayor of Dunedin; 1968–1977	Succeeded by Cliff Skeggs
New Zealand Parliament
Preceded by Fred Jones	Member of Parliament for St Kilda; 1951–1954	Succeeded by Bill Fraser
