= Len Wright =

New Zealand businessman and politician (1906–1967)

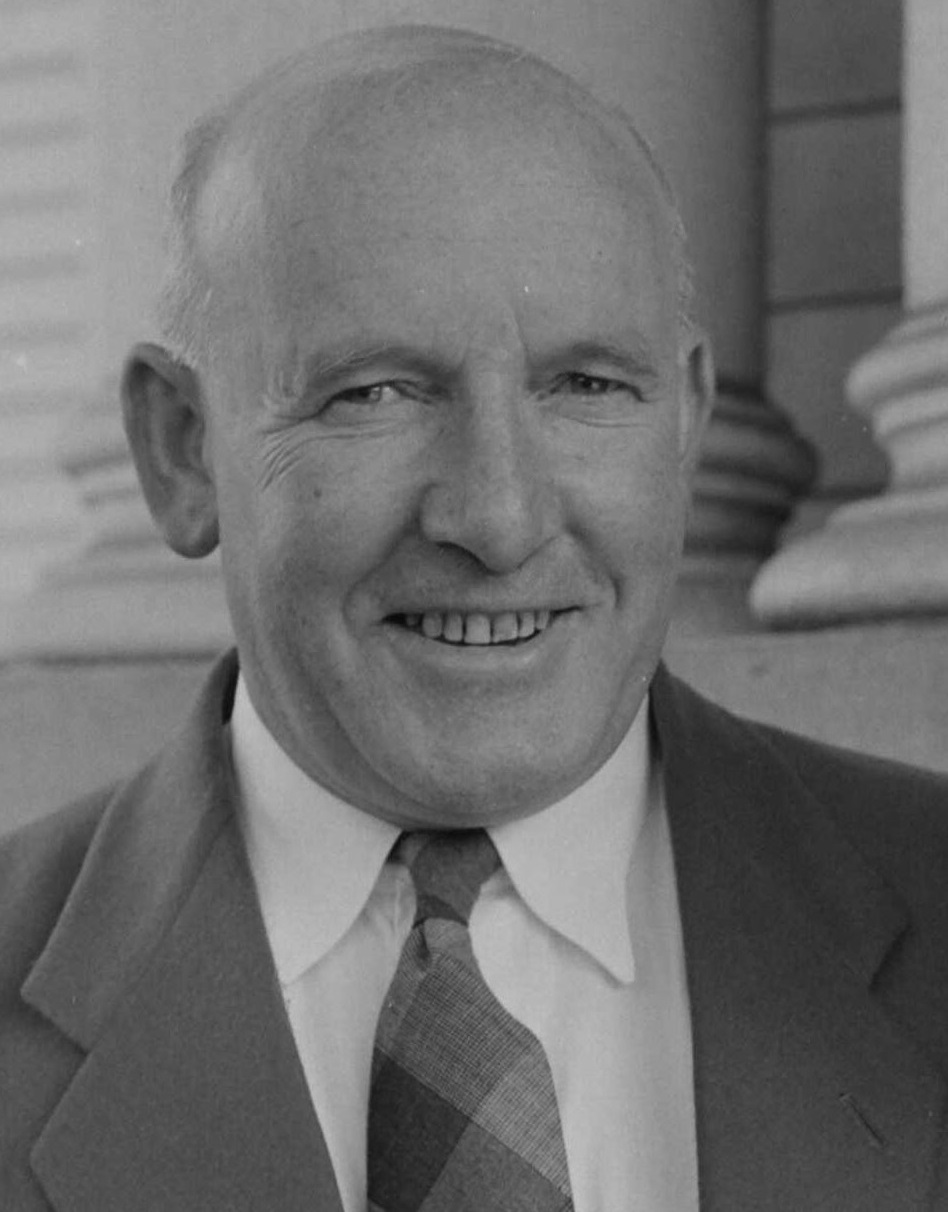
Len Wright in 1957

Sir Leonard Morton Wright (1906 – 22 October 1967) was a New Zealand businessman and was Mayor of Dunedin from 1950 to 1959.

He was born in Australia and educated in Sydney. He married Cecily Bell in 1936.

He was a tea importer and formed his own business in 1927. He was on the Dunedin City Council for ten years, was Chairman of the Otago Development Council, and was honorary tea controller from 1941 to 1950. He was a rugby referee and sports administrator. In 1953, Wright was awarded the Queen Elizabeth II Coronation Medal. He was appointed a Knight Bachelor in the 1957 New Year Honours.

Morton died at Dunedin on 22 October 1967, and his ashes were buried at Andersons Bay Cemetery.

Political offices
Preceded by Donald Charles Cameron	Mayor of Dunedin; 1950–1959	Succeeded by Stuart Sidey
