= Stuart Sidey =

New Zealand mayor and lawyer (1908-2007)

Stuart Sidey CMG
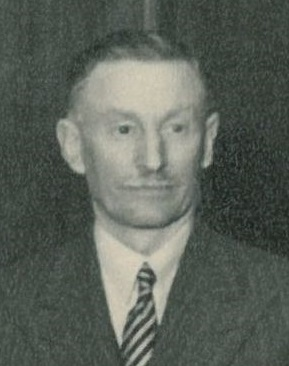
- Sidey in c. 1953

50th Mayor of Dunedin
- In office 1959–1965
- Preceded by: Len Wright
- Succeeded by: Russell Calvert

Personal details
- Born: Thomas Kay Stuart Sidey; 8 October 1908 Dunedin, New Zealand
- Died: 28 October 2007 (aged 99) Wānaka, New Zealand
- Party: National
- Spouse: Beryl Thomas (m. 1933; died 1977)
- Relatives: Thomas Sidey (father)
- Occupation: Lawyer

Thomas Kay Stuart Sidey CMG (8 October 1908 – 28 October 2007) was a former New Zealand politician who served as Mayor of Dunedin.

== Biography ==
=== Early life and career ===
Born in 1908, he was brought up in Corstorphine House. He was the only child of Sir Thomas Sidey, a Dunedin Member of Parliament, cabinet minister and lawyer. Sidey was a lawyer, educated at Otago Boys' High School and the University of Otago. He was on the Otago University Council for 34 years. In World War II he was a Major in the New Zealand Army in the Pacific. He ran the Wickliffe Press in Dunedin and bred racehorses.

He married Beryl Thomas in 1933; they had one son (Dr. Tom Sidey, 1934–2016) and one daughter.

=== Political career ===
Sidey was Mayor of Dunedin from 1959 to 1965 for the Citizens Association, and was a member of the Dunedin City Council from 1947 to 1983. He stood for Parliament three times; in the 1935 election, he was defeated by Fred Jones in the Dunedin South electorate, in the 1938 election, he was defeated by Gervan McMillan in the Dunedin West electorate and in the 1946 election, he was defeated by Philip Connolly in the Dunedin Central electorate.

In the 1968 Queen's Birthday Honours, Sidey was appointed a Companion of the Order of St Michael and St George, for services to the community, especially to local government.

Political offices
Preceded by Len Wright	Mayor of Dunedin; 1959–1965	Succeeded by Russell Calvert
Academic offices
Preceded by Hubert Ryburn	Chancellor of the University of Otago; 1970–1976	Succeeded by Jack Somerville
