= Political history of New Zealand =

History of politics in New Zealand

The political history of New Zealand covers political events and trends related to the history of New Zealand, from the precolonial to the contemporary period, including significant milestones such as the attainment of self-government, transition to Dominion status, and ultimately, independence.

Prior to British colonisation, New Zealand politics were dominated by Māori chiefs (rangatira) as leaders of iwi and hapū, utilising Māori customs as a political system. New Zealand became a British colony after the signing of the Treaty of Waitangi in 1840. Subsequently, a series of conflicts between the colonial government and Māori forces resulted in the alienation and confiscation of large amounts of Māori land.

The Colony of New Zealand was initially directly ruled by the governor. Early settlers desired representative democracy, leading to the first nationwide parliamentary election in 1853. In the 1st Parliament, there was a debate over whether ministers should be chosen by the governor or be responsible to Parliament; parliamentarians prevailed, leading to the formation of the first responsible government in 1856. Similar to Britain, suffrage in New Zealand was initially limited to males over 21 who were British subjects and owned a certain amount of land, effectively excluding Māori from voting rights. In 1867, Māori seats were established, allowing Māori to vote without property qualification. New Zealand granted voting rights to women in 1893, becoming the first self-governing country to do so. The party system in New Zealand began to take shape in the 1890s, prior to which all members of parliament were independents. The Liberal Party, formed in 1891, passed many significant progressive social and economic measures during its 21-year period in government. It was the sole political party until the establishment of the conservative Reform Party in 1909. The Liberal Party declined in the 1920s and became the United Party.

The early 20th-century working class and trade unions, discontent with existing political representation, founded the Labour Party in 1916. After Labour won office in 1935, the United and Reform parties amalgamated to form the National Party, marking the start of a two-party system dominated by Labour and National. Labour expanded New Zealand's welfare state, which was largely maintained by alternating Labour and National governments, until the 1980s when Labour initiated free-market reforms, further advanced by the National government in the 1990s. Third parties did not gain significant power until the electoral system was reformed in 1993, transitioning to a proportional representation system known as mixed-member proportional (MMP). The new MMP system has resulted in a multi-party system, with New Zealand governments since consisting of various parties.

== Māori society ==
The original Māori society of New Zealand was based on a collective identity found on the iwi and hapū. Iwi are the largest social units in Māori society. In the Māori language iwi roughly means "people" or "nation", and is often translated as "tribe", or "a confederation of tribes". Iwi groups trace their ancestry to the original Polynesian migrants who, according to tradition, arrived from Hawaiki. Some iwi cluster into larger groupings that are based on whakapapa (genealogical tradition) and known as waka (literally "canoes", with reference to the original migration voyages). Māori use rohe to describe the territory or boundaries of iwi. In pre-European times, most Māori were allied to relatively small groups in the form of hapū ("sub-tribes") and whānau ("family"). Each iwi contains a number of hapū; among the hapū of the Ngāti Whātua iwi, for example, are Te Uri-o-Hau, Te Roroa, Te Taoū, and Ngāti Whātua-o-Ōrākei.

From the early 16th century, settlements were based around the pā. The pā were village or defensive hillforts–fortified settlements with palisades and defensive terraces–or fortified villages. A great pā represented the mana (prestige or power) and strategic ability of an iwi, as personified by a rangatira (chieftain). Māori built pā in various defensible locations around the rohe of an iwi to protect fertile plantation-sites and food supplies. A person's mana on the other hand could based on one of two sources: mana tangata, authority derived from whakapapa and mana huānga, defined as "authority derived from having a wealth of resources to gift to others to bind them into reciprocal obligations". Political leadership or governance traditionally came from the ariki and the rangatira. The ariki are "persons of the highest rank and seniority". The rangatira are the hereditary Māori leaders of hapū, often described by Europeans as chieftains.

The first impacts of Europeans in Oceania involved the effect of new weapons on traditional conflict. The Musket Wars were a series of as many as 3,000 battles and raids fought throughout New Zealand (including the Chatham Islands) among Māori between 1807 and 1837, after Māori first obtained muskets and then engaged in an intertribal arms race in order to gain territory or seek revenge for past defeats. The battles resulted in the deaths of between 20,000 and 40,000 people and the enslavement of tens of thousands of Māori and significantly altered the rohe. The wars also included the Moriori genocide. In the aftermath of the conflicts, three notable military leaders emerged as dominant figures in New Zealand's landscape: Hongi Hika from the Ngāpuhi iwi, Te Wherowhero of Waikato, and Te Rauparaha representing Ngāti Toa. Not just firearms but also innovative tactics and strategies shook up traditional tribal structures.

== Colonial New Zealand ==
New Zealand's connection to the British Empire began in 1830, initiated by Te Rauparaha, who sought the help of English Captain Stewart. In 1831, leaders from the Bay of Islands reached out to King William IV, requesting British protection against both British subjects and potential French incursions. Official British involvement took a modest step forward in May 1833 with the arrival of James Busby as the British Resident, funded by the Colony of New South Wales. In 1835, Busby crafted a Declaration of Independence, which was initially endorsed by 35 rangatira under The United Tribes of New Zealand. An additional 17 rangatira later signed the document, effectively proclaiming New Zealand as an independent state under British protection.

=== Establishment of the New Zealand Government ===
The Treaty of Waitangi between rangatira and British representatives of Queen Victoria was subsequently signed on 6 February 1840. In the English version of the treaty, Māori ceded sovereignty in return for the rights, privileges and protections of being a British subject. The Māori translation of the treaty refers to kāwanatanga which is generally translated as governance rather than sovereignty and this point remains a subject of much controversy and political debate. With the establishment of the Crown colony, Hobson became governor of New Zealand. The first organs of the New Zealand Government were also established to assist the governor: an Executive Council and a (General) Legislative Council. The Legislative Council had the power to issue laws called Ordinances. The colony was initially divided into three provinces: New Ulster Province (the North Island), New Munster Province (the South Island), and New Leinster Province (Stewart Island).

In 1840 the New Zealand Company, a company chartered in the United Kingdom for the systematic colonisation of New Zealand, raised the flag of the United Tribes at their settlement in Port Nicholson (Wellington), proclaiming government by "colonial council" that claimed to derive its powers from authority granted by local chiefs. Interpreting the moves as "high treason", Governor William Hobson declared British sovereignty over the entirety of the North Island on 21 May 1840, and on 23 May declared the council illegal. He then despatched his Colonial Secretary, Willoughby Shortland, with 30 soldiers and six mounted police on 30 June 1840, to Port Nicholson to tear down the flag. Shortland commanded the residents to withdraw from their "illegal association" and to submit to the representatives of the Crown.

The New Zealand Constitution Act was passed in 1852 and became the central constitutional document of the colony. It created the General Assembly, which consisted of the governor-appointed Legislative Council and an elected House of Representatives. The first general election for the House of Representatives was held from 14 July 1853 until early October. The 1st New Zealand Parliament was opened on 24 May 1854. The Administrator of Government, Robert Wynyard, was quickly confronted by the demands of the new parliament that responsible government be granted to the colony immediately; on 2 June the House of Representatives passed a resolution, sponsored by Edward Gibbon Wakefield, to that effect. Wynyard refused, and prorogued parliament for two weeks.

Parliament met on 8 August 1855, by which time Wynyard had received instructions from the Colonial Office to introduce responsible government. The new governor, Sir Thomas Gore Browne, arrived on 6 September 1855 and relieved Wynyard of his duties. Governor Thomas Gore Browne subsequently announced that self-government would begin with the 2nd New Zealand Parliament, elected in 1855. The Sewell Ministry constituted the first responsible government, with control over all domestic matters other than native policy. Formed in 1856, it lasted from 18 April to 20 May. From 7 May onward, Henry Sewell was titled "colonial secretary", and is generally regarded as having been the country's first prime minister.

=== Māori resistance ===
The New Zealand Wars took place from 1845 to 1872 between the New Zealand colonial government and allied Māori on one side, and Māori and Māori-allied settlers on the other. Although Māori were initially fought by British Army forces, the New Zealand government developed its own military force, including local militia, rifle volunteer groups, the specialist Forest Rangers and kūpapa (pro-government Māori). Traders, Sydney businessmen and the New Zealand Company had bought large tracts of land before 1840. The Treaty of Waitangi included the right of pre-emption on land sales, and the New Zealand colonial government, pressured by immigrant European settlers, tried to speed up land sales to provide farmland. This met resistance from the Māori King Movement that emerged in the 1850s and opposed further European encroachment.

The Māori King Movement, or Kīngitanga, arose among a group of central North Island iwi in the 1850s as a means of attaining Māori unity to halt the alienation of land at a time of rapid population growth by European colonists. The movement sought to establish a monarch who could claim status similar to that of Queen Victoria, and thus allow Māori to deal with Pākehā (Europeans) on equal footing. It took on the appearance of an alternative government with its own flag, newspaper, bank, councillors, magistrates and law enforcement. Violence over land ownership broke out first in the Wairau Valley in the South Island in June 1843, but rising tensions in Taranaki eventually led to the involvement of British military forces at Waitara in March 1860. The war between the government and Kīngitanga Māori spread to other areas of the North Island, with the biggest single campaign being the invasion of the Waikato in 1863–1864, before hostilities concluded with the pursuits of Riwha Tītokowaru in Taranaki (1868–1869) and Rangatira Te Kooti Arikirangi Te Turuki on the East Coast (1868–1872).

At the peak of hostilities in the 1860s, 18,000 British Army troops, supported by artillery, cavalry and local militia, battled about 4,000 Māori warriors in what became a gross imbalance of manpower and weaponry. Guerrilla-style tactics were used by both sides in later campaigns, often fought in dense bush. Over the course of the Taranaki and Waikato campaigns, the lives of about 1,800 Māori and 800 Europeans were lost, and total Māori losses over the course of all the wars may have exceeded 2,100. The New Zealand land confiscations took place during the 1860s to punish the Kīngitanga movement for attempting to set up an alternative Māori form of government that forbade the selling of land to European settlers. The confiscation law targeted Kīngitanga Māori against whom the government had waged war to restore the rule of British law. More than 1,200,000 hectares (3,000,000 acres) or 4.4 percent of land were confiscated, mainly in Waikato, Taranaki and the Bay of Plenty, but also in South Auckland, Hauraki, Te Urewera, Hawke's Bay and the East Coast.

=== Development of national institutions ===
The termination of provincial governance in 1876 by the Continuous Ministry led New Zealand to adopt a political framework with a unitary and centralised structure, featuring a bicameral system. The lower house was elected through universal male suffrage starting in 1879, an upper house, composed of property owners, was appointed. Māori men gained the right to vote 12 years prior to European settlers, a move aimed at alleviating tensions arising from past conflicts and from 1867 onwards, Māori males aged 21 or older, even those of mixed descent, could vote for representatives in four dedicated Māori parliamentary seats.' The expansion of voting rights to all adult men in December 1879, combined with the implementation of the secret ballot in 1870, positioned New Zealand as an early adopter of democratic principles and led to a shift towards national issues in electoral debates.

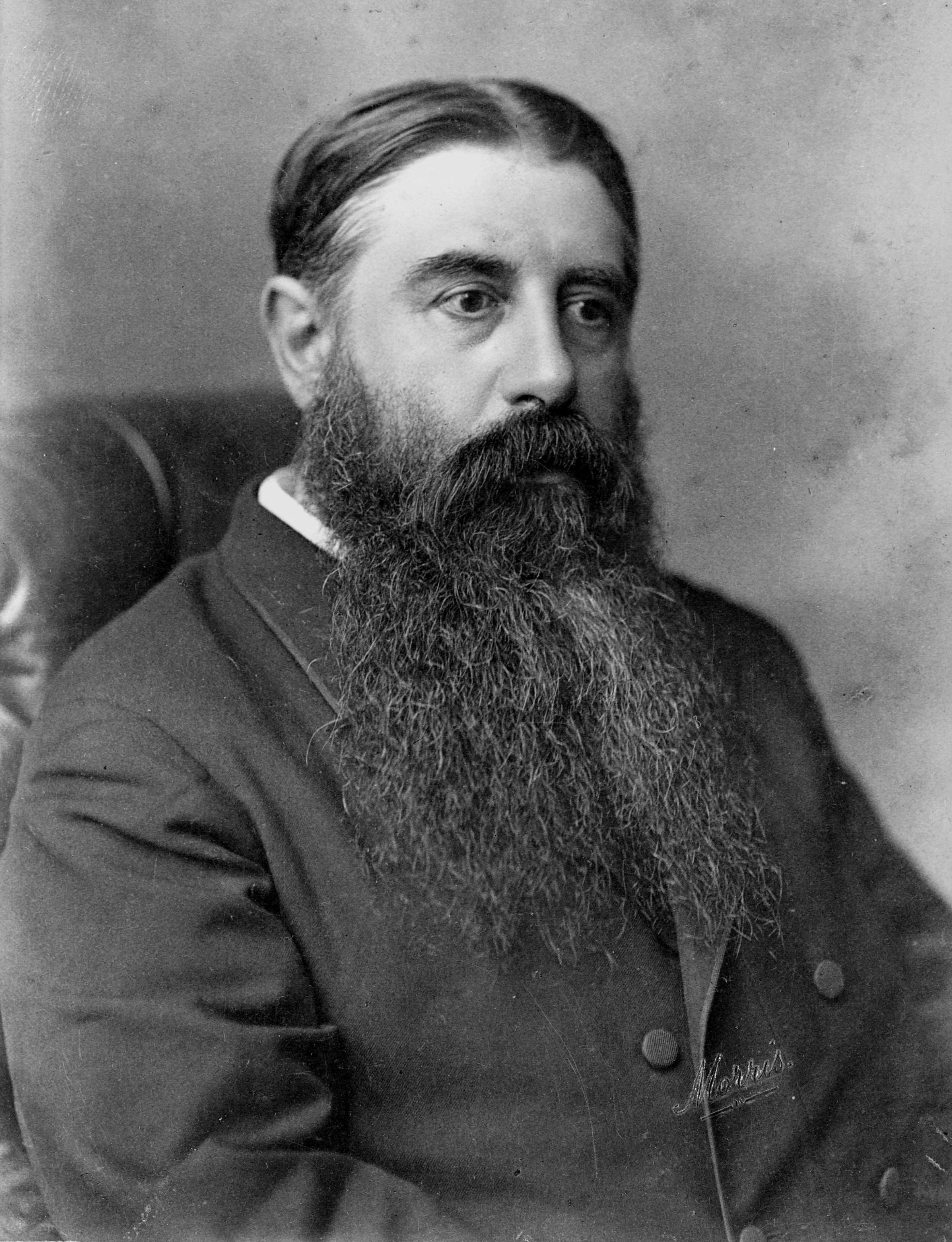
Premier Julius Vogel, whose time in office has been dubbed "The Vogel Era"

During the so-called Vogel Era, Julius Vogel was premier from 1873 to 1875 and again in 1876. From 1876 to 1881, he was agent-general for New Zealand in London, and, in 1884, he was again a member of the government of the colony. Vogel is best remembered for his "Great Public Works" scheme of the 1870s. Before 1870, New Zealand was a country largely dominated by provincial interests and pork-barrel politics. After Vogel, as colonial treasurer, proposed borrowing the large sum of 10 million pounds, New Zealand developed a significant infrastructure of roads, railways and communication, all administered by central government. During his political career, Vogel worked generally successfully for reconciliation with the Māori.

The Liberal Government of New Zealand was the first responsible government in New Zealand politics organised along party lines. The government formed following the founding of the Liberal Party after the victory of liberal-leaning members of Parliament, led by John Ballance, at the 1890 general election. Despite an attempt by Harry Atkinson and other members of the previous government to stack the Legislative Council against the new government, it took office on 24 January 1891 and governed New Zealand for over 21 years until 10 July 1912, becoming the longest-serving government in New Zealand's history. Under Richard Seddon, the government was also historically notable for enacting significant social and economic changes, such as the Old Age Pensions Act. It also passed the Industrial Conciliation and Arbitration Act 1894 that established a conciliation and compulsory arbitration system with the aim of providing the unions with the means of protecting their members.

=== Women's suffrage ===
In 1887, Julius Vogel introduced the first women's suffrage bill to Parliament, but it was unsuccessful. Women's suffrage in New Zealand was eventually granted after about two decades of campaigning by women such as Kate Sheppard and Mary Ann Müller and organisations such as the New Zealand branch of the Women's Christian Temperance Union. On 19 September 1893 the governor, Lord Glasgow, signed a new Electoral Act into law. As a result, New Zealand became the first self-governing nation in the world in which all women had the right to vote in parliamentary elections. Women cast their first votes in the 1893 general election, with a high 85% turnout, compared to the 70% turnout among men.

=== Radical politics ===
At the turn of the 20th century, the radical side of New Zealand working class politics was represented by the Socialist Party, founded in 1901. In 1905 a group of working-class politicians who were dissatisfied with the Liberal approach established the Independent Political Labour League, which managed to win a seat in Parliament in the 1908 election. At the same time, moderates contested as "Lib-Lab" candidates, aligning with the Liberal Party while enjoying the endorsement of the labour movement. A Blackball miners' strike in 1908 led to the founding of the first nationwide federation of trade unions (the "Red Federation"). In 1912, the labour movement went through the Waihi miners' strike, a major industrial disturbance prompted by radicals in the union movement. The movement split over supporting or opposing the radicals, and in the end, the conservative Reform Party government of William Massey suppressed the strike by force. Eventually the founding of the New Zealand Labour Party, on 7 July 1916 in Wellington, brought together different socialist groups.

The Kotahitanga movement, which sought unity among various Māori iwi, played a pivotal role in advocating for indigenous rights and established a separate Māori parliament. The first session of this Māori parliament was convened in 1897 at Papawai, near Greytown in the Wairarapa region, in specifically constructed facilities. The Kīngitanga (Māori King) movement had also set up a competing parliament, giving rise to the Young Māori Party. A compromise in 1900 led to the formation of Māori Land Councils to replace the Parliament. These councils were meant to strike a balance between the indigenous communities' desires to retain their remaining land and settler demands for new territory. but the influence of the councils waned when they were perceived as obstacles to settlement by the government. Following the enactment of the Native Land Act in 1909, which lifted limitations on land sales, the pace of land loss among indigenous communities accelerated significantly.

== Independence ==
=== Dominion status ===
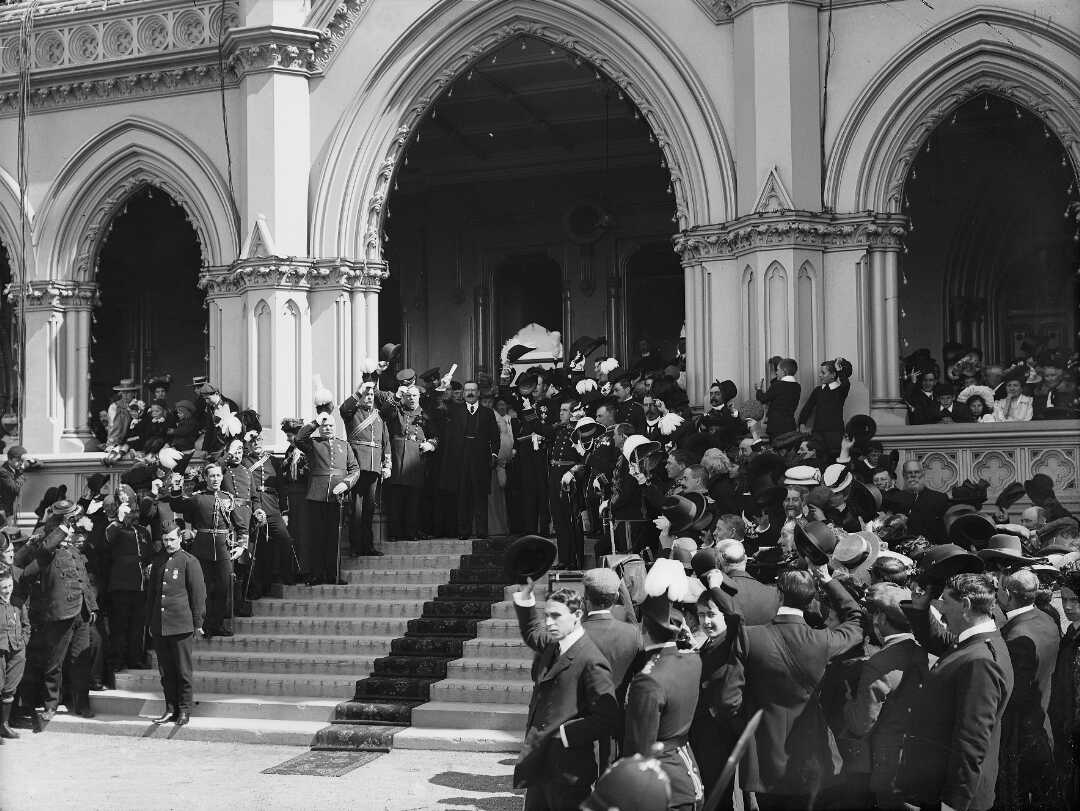
Governor Lord Plunket declaring New Zealand a Dominion, Wellington, 26 September 1907

Following the 1907 Imperial conference, the House of Representatives passed a motion requesting that King Edward VII "take such steps as he may consider necessary" to change the designation of New Zealand from the Colony of New Zealand to the Dominion of New Zealand. The adoption of the designation of Dominion would, "raise the status of New Zealand" stated Prime Minister Sir Joseph Ward and "… have no other effect than that of doing the country good". A royal proclamation granting New Zealand the designation of 'Dominion' was issued on 9 September 1907.

With the attaining of Dominion status, the Colonial Treasurer became the Minister of Finance and the Colonial Secretary's Office was renamed the Department of Internal Affairs. The proclamation of 10 September also designated members of the House of Representatives as "M.P." (Member of Parliament). Previously they were designated "M.H.R." (Member of the House of Representatives). Dominion status allowed New Zealand to become virtually independent, while retaining the monarch as head of state, represented by a governor appointed in consultation with the New Zealand Government. Control over defence, constitutional amendments, and (partially) foreign affairs remained with the British Government, however.

=== Conservative rule, 1912–1928 ===
The Reform Government of New Zealand was the government of New Zealand from 1912 to 1928, led by the conservative Reform Party. In the 1911 general election, the Reform Party won thirty-seven seats compared with thirty-three for the Liberals. Supporters of the Liberals denied that Reform had won a mandate to rule, however, pointing out that the country quota (a system in which rural electorates were smaller than urban ones, meaning that rural areas were slightly over-represented in Parliament) worked to "inflate" Reform's vote. Nevertheless, it did not take long for the Liberal government, now ruling only with the support of independents, to fall. William Massey became prime minister on 10 July 1912. In government, the Reform Party implemented many of its policies regarding freehold and public service reform. Many other Liberal-era policies were not changed, however, and Reform gained further support from disillusioned members of the Liberal Party.

Following the outbreak of World War One, the Reform and Liberal parties formed a National Government in August 1915. In the first action of New Zealand in the war, following the sailing of a Samoa Expeditionary Force on 15 August, the Occupation of German Samoa soon took place without any fighting. On 17 December 1920, the League of Nations formally conferred a Class C Mandate over the former German Samoa to the Dominion of New Zealand. On 1 April 1922, the Samoa Act 1921 came into force. Under the Act, the New Zealand Governor-General appointed an administrator based in Apia to hold executive power and to report to the New Zealand Minister of External Affairs in Wellington; lawmaking power was held by the administrator and a local legislative council, although Wellington had final authority. The Mau (translates as "strongly held opinion") was a popular non-violent movement which had its beginnings in the early 1900s (decade) in Savai'i, which in 1920s saw the resurgence of the Mau in opposition to the New Zealand administration.

=== United Party, coalition governments and party merger, 1928–1935 ===
In the 1920s the Liberal Party, although previously dominant in New Zealand party politics, seemed in serious long-term decline following the advent of the Labour Party, and its organisation had decayed to the point of collapse. The United Party represented an unexpected resurgence of the Liberals, and some historians consider it nothing more than the Liberal Party under a new name. In the 1928 general election, the new United Party performed surprisingly well, winning twenty-seven seats. The United Party subsequently formed a government with the backing of the Labour Party. In 1931 the United government passed a number of economic measures which appeared unfavourable to workers, and the Labour Party withdrew its support. The United Party continued in office with reluctant support from the Reform Party, which feared that a collapse of government (and thus a general election) would see large gains for Labour. Later the same year, formal coalition talks took place between United, Reform, and Labour, with a "unity government" proposed to counter the Great Depression. Labour eventually walked out of the talks, but Reform leader Gordon Coates (pressed by Downie Stewart) eventually agreed to form a coalition between United and Reform.

The coalition went into the 1935 general election under the title of the "National Political Federation", a name adopted to indicate that the grouping intended to represent New Zealanders from all backgrounds (in contrast to the previous situation, where United served city-dwellers and Reform served farmers). However, because of the effects of the depression and a perception that the existing coalition government had handled the situation poorly, the National Political Federation lost heavily in 1935 to the Labour Party, the rise of which had prompted the alliance. The two parties were cut down to 19 seats between them. Another factor was a third party, the Democrat Party formed by Albert Davy, a former organiser for the coalition who disapproved of the "socialist" measures that the coalition had introduced. The new party split the conservative vote and aided Labour's victory. United and Reform maintained their coalition while in opposition. In 1936 they decided to make the coalition permanent and to merge United and Reform into the National Party, which became one of New Zealand's two dominant political parties from that point on.

=== First Labour Party government, 1935–1949 ===
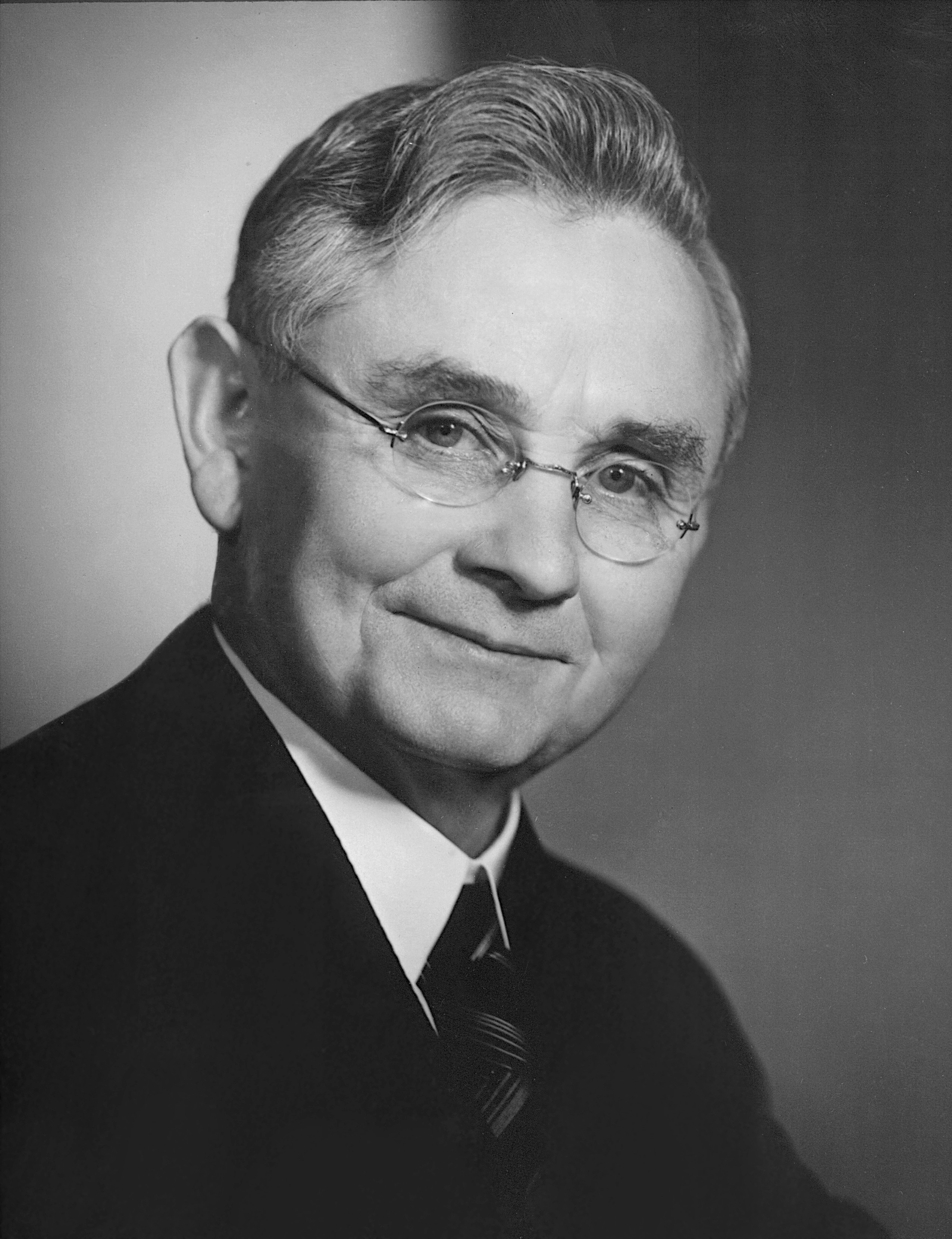
The first Labour prime minister Michael Joseph Savage is ranked as one of New Zealand's greatest prime ministers.

In the early 1930s the rigours of the Great Depression brought the Labour Party considerable popularity. In the 1935 election, Labour gained a significant majority, gaining 53 seats to the coalition's 19, and returned to government. Party leader Michael Joseph Savage became prime minister on 6 December 1935, marking the beginning of Labour's first term in office. The new government quickly set about implementing a number of significant reforms, including a reorganisation of the social-welfare system (with the Social Security Act 1938) and setting up the state housing scheme. Workers also benefited from the introduction of the forty-hour week, and legislation making it easier for unions to negotiate on their behalf. Savage himself was highly popular with the working classes, and his portrait could be found on walls in many houses around the country. At this time the Labour Party pursued an alliance with the Māori Rātana movement. This alliance was formalised with the Rātana movement joining with the Labour Party in a meeting between Rātana and Prime Minister Michael Savage on 22 April 1936.

Savage died in 1940 and Peter Fraser, who became Labour's longest-serving prime minister, replaced him. Fraser became best-known as New Zealand's head of government for most of World War II. In the 1944 Speech from the Throne the Governor-General announced the Fraser government's intention to adopt the Statute of Westminster. In 1946, Fraser instructed Government departments not to use the term "Dominion" any longer. The adoption of the Statute of Westminster took place on 25 November 1947 with the Statute of Westminster Adoption Act 1947. This Act allowed passing of the New Zealand Constitution Amendment (Request and Consent) Act 1947, which granted the New Zealand Parliament full legislative powers, extra-territorial control of the New Zealand military forces and legally separated the New Zealand Crown from the British Crown. In 1948, the New Zealand Parliament passed the British Nationality and New Zealand Citizenship Act 1948, altering the New Zealand nationality law. From 1 January 1949 all New Zealanders became New Zealand citizens.

=== Return of conservative government, 1949–1972 ===
In the 1949 election, the National Party campaigned on "the private ownership of production, distribution and exchange". It saw the governing Labour Party defeated by the opposition and the beginning of the First National government. Once in power the new government led by Sidney Holland proved decidedly administratively conservative, retaining, for instance, compulsory unionism and the welfare state set up by the previous Labour government. In 1951, the Waterfront Dispute broke out, lasting 151 days. The National government stepped into the conflict, acting in opposition to the maritime unions. Holland also used this opportunity to call the snap 1951 general election. Campaigning on an anti-Communist platform and exploiting the Labour Opposition's apparent indecisiveness, National returned with an increased majority, gaining 54 parliamentary seats out of 80. In the 1954 general election, National was elected to a third term, though losing some of its seats. Towards the end of his third term, however, Holland became increasingly ill, and stepped down from the leadership shortly before the general election in 1957. Keith Holyoake, the party's long-standing deputy leader, took Holland's place. Holyoake, however, had insufficient time to establish himself in the public mind as prime minister, and lost in the general election later that year to Labour, then led by Walter Nash. The resulting Second Labour Government of New Zealand from 1957 to 1960 only lasted for one term, however, largely owing to the unpopular tax increases of the 1958 Black Budget.

Holyoke and the National Party returned to power in 1960. The Holyoake government implemented numerous reforms of the public services and government institutions: for example, it created the Office of the Ombudsman and numerous quasi-autonomous non-governmental organisations, and strengthened parliamentary scrutiny of the executive. Public broadcasting was removed from direct government oversight and placed under corporation control. Holyoake's government rewrote the criminal legal code, passing the Crimes Act 1961; the Act abolished capital punishment in New Zealand, though only ten National MPs voted for its abolition. Holyoake accepted the post-war political consensus; he believed in the necessity of a mixed economy, championing a Keynesian strategy of public investment to maintain demand. However, as an anti-socialist, Holyoake sought to reduce the role of trade unions in industrial relations and the National government introduced a form of voluntary unionism. In February 1972, Holyoake stood aside and was replaced by his deputy, Jack Marshall, who took steps to reinvigorate the party. In the 1972 general election Labour's slogan was "It's Time – Time for a change, time for Labour", which expertly captured the national mood and Labour, led by Norman Kirk, defeated the governing National Party.

=== Labour Party reforms, 1972–1975 ===
The Third Labour Government of New Zealand from 1972 to 1975 carried out a wide range of reforms in areas such as overseas trade, farming, public works, energy generation, local government, health, the arts, sport and recreation, regional development, environmental protection, education, housing, and social welfare. The government's most significant policies concerned attempts to create a distinct New Zealand identity, both internally and in the world. For most of its history, New Zealand had been, economically, culturally and politically, highly dependent on Britain. However, by the early 1970s many New Zealanders felt the need for genuine national independence, a feeling strengthened when Britain joined the European Economic Community in 1973, causing serious problems for New Zealand trade. This was the first government to give serious recognition to the Treaty of Waitangi, first by making the anniversary of its signing a national public holiday, and then by establishing the Waitangi Tribunal to investigate contemporary breaches of it. Both were concessions to increasingly angry Māori protest, as was the appointment of Matiu Rata to Minister of Māori Affairs (and initially Lands). He was the first Māori Minister of Māori Affairs since the 1930s and the first ever Māori Minister of Lands. Māori also benefited from revisions to the laws relating to land, together with a significant increase in a Māori and Island Affairs building programme. The government lasted for one term before being defeated a year after the death of its popular leader, Norman Kirk.

=== Conservative rule under Robert Muldoon, 1975–1984 ===
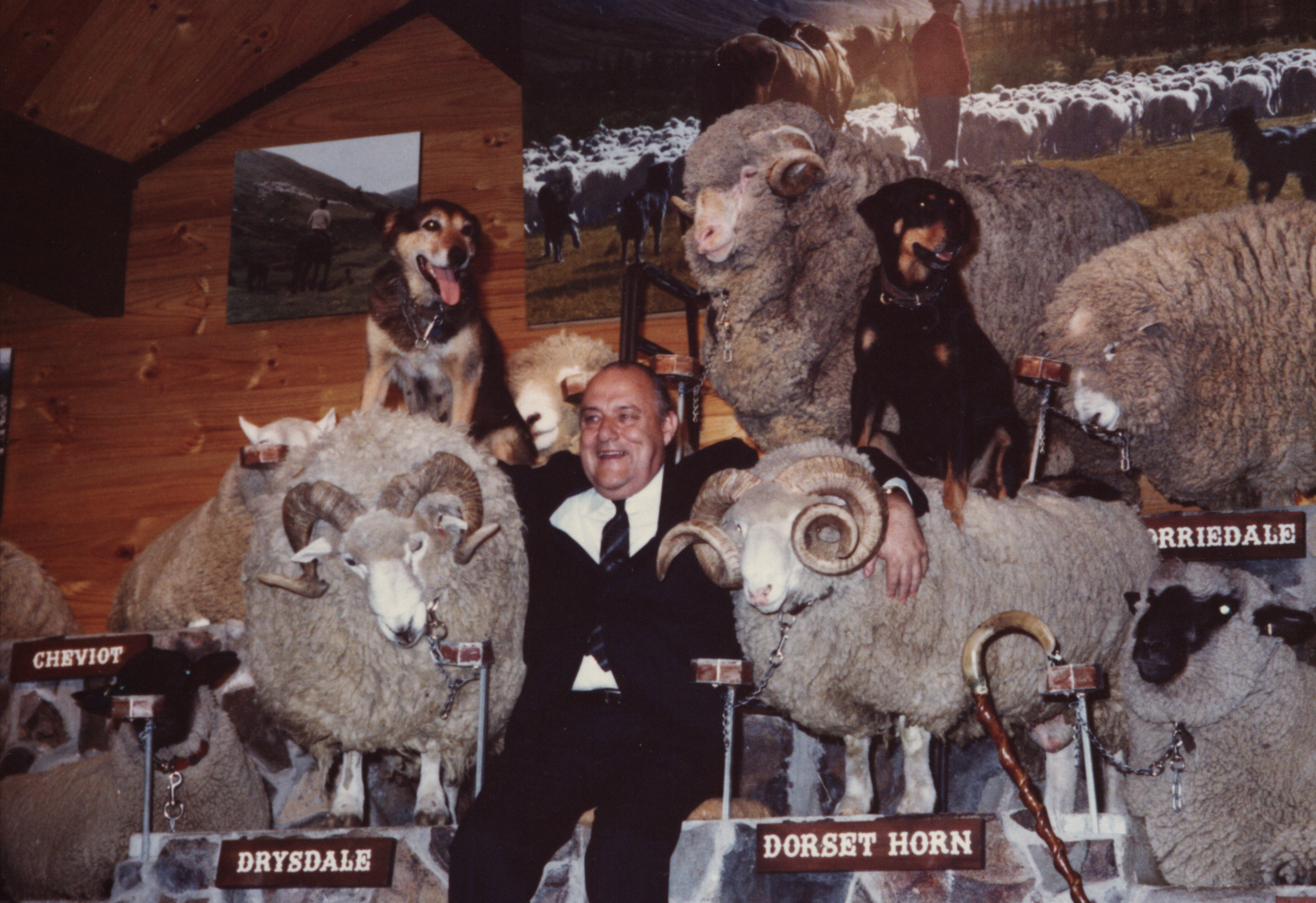
Robert Muldoon at the Agrodome in 1980

After the 1975 general election, the National Party under Robert Muldoon came to power promising to lead "a Government of the ordinary bloke". Although he used populist rhetoric to rail against elites and the political establishment, he consistently tried to centralise power under himself during his premiership. His tenure was plagued by an economic pattern of stagnation, high inflation, growing unemployment, and high external debts and borrowing. Economic policies of the Muldoon Government included national superannuation, wage and price freezes, industrial incentives, and the Think Big industrial projects. He reintroduced and intensified the previous government's policies of the Dawn Raids, which racially targeted Pasifika overstayers. To engage with crime, Muldoon built "unusually close relationships" with criminal gangs; he personally favoured Black Power, and he and his wife Thea met with them on several occasions.

Muldoon led his party to two additional election victories in 1978 and 1981. Departing significantly from National Party convention, Muldoon had a controversial public image. He has been called the first world leader to be so openly informal and abrasive. He became more and more controversial as his premiership progressed. His refusal to stop a Springbok rugby tour of New Zealand divided the country and led to unprecedented civil disorder in 1981. In addition to the controversy of the Springbok tour, he began a smear campaign against Labour MP Colin Moyle for allegedly being gay, visited strip clubs, and once personally punched demonstrators at a protest.

The Social Credit Party, which was New Zealand's third party for much of the 20th century, reached its zenith in 1981, achieving an unprecedented 20.7% of the nationwide vote but only two seats. In 1978 and 1981 Labour secured more votes than the National Party but failed to win a majority of seats. Labour leader Bill Rowling claimed both results as a moral victory.

At the 1984 snap election—which Muldoon infamously called while visibly drunk (and nicknamed the Schnapps election) —National finally suffered a significant defeat to Labour. Shortly before leaving office, amid a constitutional crisis, Muldoon was forced by the incoming Government to devalue the New Zealand dollar (see below).

=== Constitutional crisis and reform ===
During the 1980s, New Zealand underwent significant constitutional changes. In 1983, the Government replaced the outdated Letters Patent of 1917 that delineated the powers and duties of the governor-general; new Letters Patent issued in 1983 "patriated" the office of governor-general, transferring control from imperial to New Zealand authority.

In 1984, Robert Muldoon lost power after nine years as prime minister. Convention required him to follow the instructions of the incoming government during the transition period, but he refused to cooperate, leading to a constitutional crisis amidst a major currency crisis. The constitutional crisis led the incoming Labour government to review New Zealand's constitutional structures, which resulted in the Constitution Act 1986. The new Constitution Act rationalised New Zealand's legal framework by revoking the New Zealand Constitution Act 1952 and the Statute of Westminster. It nullified the authority of the British Parliament to enact laws for New Zealand (even with the consent of the New Zealand Parliament).

=== Labour's return and economic liberalisation, 1984–1990 ===
The Fourth Labour Government governed from 26 July 1984 to 2 November 1990 (the period up to 8 August 1989). It was the first Labour government to win a second consecutive term since the First Labour Government. The policy agenda of the Fourth Labour Government differed significantly from that of previous Labour governments: it enacted major social reforms (such as homosexual law reform) and economic reforms (including corporatisation of state services and reform of the tax system). The economic reforms became known as "Rogernomics" (echoing Reaganomics), after Finance Minister Roger Douglas. Rogernomics featured market-led restructuring and deregulation and the control of inflation through tight monetary policy, a 20% devaluation of the dollar, corporatisation of state-owned business, removal of subsidies to industries (particularly agricultural subsidies), reduction of tariff protection, and a significant overhaul of the tax system. Tax cuts were implemented, and a Goods and Services Tax (initially set at 10%) was introduced.

Rogernomics represented a sharp departure from the post-war political consensus that emphasised heavy interventionism, protectionism, and full employment. Instead, it embraced principles of small government, balanced budgets, and free-market policies influenced by the Chicago school of economics. Douglas' adoption of policies more usually associated with the political right (or New Right), and their implementation by a Labour government, became the subject of lasting controversy. The Labour government also enacted nuclear-free legislation, which led to the United States suspending its treaty obligations to New Zealand under the ANZUS alliance. David Lange led the government for most of its two three-year terms in office. Disagreements between Lange and Douglas split the party, with Douglas' supporters later forming the ACT Party. The government suffered a defeat at the 1990 general election, but the incoming National government retained most of the reforms.

=== Electoral reforms and political changes under the National Party, 1990–1999 ===
For the first six years, the National Party governed alone under the leadership of Jim Bolger. Following in the footsteps of the previous Labour government, the Fourth National Government embarked on an extensive programme of spending cuts. This programme, popularly known as "Ruthanasia" after Finance Minister Ruth Richardson, involved the reduction of social welfare benefits and the introduction of fees for healthcare and tertiary education. This was highly controversial, as was the retention of the superannuation surtax, a tax on old age pensions which National had promised to abolish. Also controversial, but in a different way, was the beginning of the Treaty settlement process.

Extreme dissatisfaction with both National and Labour led to the reform of the electoral system and the introduction of proportional representation in the form of mixed-member proportional (MMP) representation. The first MMP election was held in 1996, and resulted in the populist and nationalist New Zealand First party winning 17 MPs only three years after its founding. This led to a coalition between National and New Zealand First in which Bolger continued as prime minister. Bolger was ousted in 1997 and replaced as National leader and prime minister by Jenny Shipley. Disagreement between Shipley and NZ First leader Winston Peters caused the coalition to collapse in 1998; the consequent cobbling together of another coalition between National and the deserters of various parties contributed to the government's defeat in 1999.

=== New Labour government under Helen Clark, 1999–2008 ===
While in opposition, the Labour Party, under the leadership of Helen Clark, distanced itself from Rogernomics. This made it an attractive ally for the Alliance, a grouping of left-wing parties, which included defectors from Labour. In the 1999 general election, the Labour Party defeated the National Party easily, becoming the largest single party in the House of Representatives. The Fifth Labour Government was established through a coalition with the Alliance, supported by the Green Party. During its first term, the government pursued a number of progressive reforms. The controversial Employment Contracts Act was repealed, replaced by an Employment Relations Act more friendly to unions and collective bargaining; a state-owned bank, Kiwibank, was created at the behest of the Alliance; a majority stake in the national airline, Air New Zealand, was purchased; and the public health sector was reorganised with the re-establishment of partly-elected district health boards. Closing the Gaps, an affirmative action strategy targeting socio-economic inequalities between Māori and Pasifika ethnic groups and other groups, was a particularly controversial reform among right-wing National and ACT voters.

With the disintegration of the Alliance in 2002, Helen Clark called a snap election, even though she still had the confidence of the House. Labour handily won the election. The Alliance failed to return to Parliament, although a rump returned as the Progressives. Labour formed a coalition with the Progressives, and turned to the centrist United Future party for confidence and supply. This second term was notable largely for its social and constitutional legislation, with the government establishing a Supreme Court and ending appeals to the Privy Council, decriminalising prostitution, and providing for civil unions. The government was also faced in this term with the foreshore and seabed controversy. While Labour, in cooperation with the New Zealand First party, eventually resolved the legal dispute by vesting foreshore and seabed title in the Crown, a dissident Labour minister, Tariana Turia, formed the Māori Party. In the 2005 general election, the Labour government was returned with a slim margin on the strength of the Working for Families assistance package and financial assistance to students.

=== National's return to power, 2008–2017 ===
In the 2008 election, the Labour Party lost convincingly to National, and the government was succeeded by the National Party led by John Key as prime minister. National came to power during the 2008 financial crisis. In response to New Zealand's rising debt, Finance Minister Bill English made budget deficit-reduction his main priority for the first term. The government also cut taxes on all income; the top personal tax rate was lowered from 39% to 38% and then 33% in 2010. At the 26 November 2011 general election, National gained 47.31% of the party vote, the highest percentage gained by any political party since MMP was introduced, helped by a lower voter turnout and the misfortunes of its traditional support parties. The government then introduced the "mixed ownership model" plan, in which the Government planned to reduce its share in Genesis Energy, Meridian Energy, Mighty River Power and Solid Energy from 100% to 51% and Air New Zealand from 74% to 51%, and sell off the remainder. The plans to sell down Solid Energy were later axed due to the company's poor financial position. A citizens-initiated referendum on the sell-downs returned a 67.3% vote in opposition (on a turnout of 45.1%). The Fifth National Government won a third term at the 2014 general election. After serving for eight years, Key announced his resignation as the party leader on 5 December 2016. He stepped down as Prime Minister on 12 December. Key's deputy Bill English was proclaimed as the party's new leader on 12 December 2016 after Health Minister Jonathan Coleman and Minister of Police Judith Collins withdrew from the leadership election.

=== New Zealand under Jacinda Ardern and Labour, 2017–2023 ===
On 1 August 2017, Jacinda Ardern succeeded Andrew Little as both leader of the Labour Party and Leader of the Opposition. Labour's support increased rapidly after Ardern became leader, and she led her party to gain 14 seats at the 2017 general election on 23 September, winning 46 seats to the National Party's 56. After negotiations, New Zealand First chose to enter a minority coalition government with Labour, supported by the Green Party, with Ardern as prime minister. She was sworn in by the governor-general on 26 October 2017. She became the world's youngest female head of government at age 37. Ardern gave birth to her daughter on 21 June 2018, making her the world's second elected head of government to give birth while in office (after Benazir Bhutto). The Sixth Labour Government faced challenges from the New Zealand housing crisis, child poverty, and social inequality. In March 2019, in the aftermath of the Christchurch mosque shootings, Ardern reacted by rapidly introducing strict gun laws, winning her wide recognition.

Ardern moved the Labour Party further to the centre towards the October 2020 general election, promising to cut spending during the remainder of the COVID-19 recession. She led the Labour Party to a landslide victory, gaining an overall majority of 65 seats in Parliament. This was the first time a single-party majority government had been formed under MMP. On 19 January 2023, Ardern announced she would resign as Labour leader. Following the unopposed election of Chris Hipkins as her successor, she resigned as leader of the Labour Party on 22 January and submitted her resignation as prime minister to the governor-general on 25 January.

=== National–ACT–NZ First, 2023–present ===
On 30 November 2021, Christopher Luxon was elected National Party leader, after a party crisis caused the removal of previous party leader Judith Collins. He led his party into the October 2023 general election, after which National became the largest party with 38% of the party vote. Chris Hipkins' Labour Party lost nearly half of its seats.

Coalition-formation negotiations between National, ACT and New Zealand First ended on 24 November 2023, and Luxon was sworn in as prime minister by the governor-general on 27 November. The National–ACT–NZ First coalition government opposes co-governance between Māori and the Crown (advanced by the previous government), and supports conservative law and justice reforms and tax cuts.

== See also ==
- Politics of New Zealand § Modern political history
- History of voting in New Zealand
- Māori politics
