= Jack McCullough (politician) =

New Zealand tinsmith, trade unionist and political activist

The Honourable Jack McCullough
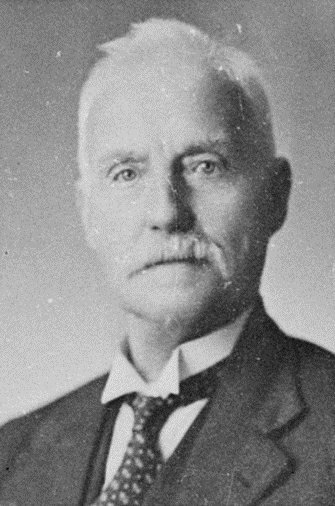

Member of the Legislative Council
- In office 9 March 1936 – 29 July 1947
- Appointed by: Michael Joseph Savage

Personal details
- Born: John Alexander McCullough; 17 January 1860 Belfast, Ireland
- Died: 29 July 1947 (aged 87) Christchurch, New Zealand
- Party: Labour Party

John Alexander McCullough (17 January 1860 – 29 July 1947) was a New Zealand tinsmith, trade unionist and political activist.

== Biography ==
He was born in Belfast, County Antrim, Ireland on 17 January 1860.

He was elected a member of the Christchurch City Council from 1912 to 1917.

The Riccarton electorate was contested by three candidates in the 1922 election. George Witty, the incumbent since the 1902 election, was successful, with Bert Kyle coming second and McCullough coming third. The First Labour Government appointed McCullough to the New Zealand Legislative Council on 9 March 1936. At the end of his seven-year term, he was reappointed on 9 March 1943. He remained a member until his death on 29 July 1947.

He died in Christchurch on 29 July 1947 aged 87.

== See also ==
The 1908 Blackball miners' strike
