= Riccarton (electorate) =

Riccarton is a former New Zealand parliamentary electorate. It existed from 1893 to 1978, and was represented by eight Members of Parliament.

== Population centres ==
In the 1892 electoral redistribution, population shift to the North Island required the transfer of one seat from the South Island to the north. The resulting ripple effect saw every electorate established in 1890 have its boundaries altered, and eight electorates were established for the first time, including Riccarton.

The electorate was in the western suburbs of Christchurch, New Zealand, and was based on the suburb of Riccarton.

== History ==
The electorate was created in 1893, and existed to 1978 when it was abolished.

The first representative of the electorate was George Russell, who started his parliamentary career with his 1893 election. Russell was beaten in the 1896 election by William Rolleston, who had distinguished himself through his contribution to education and his support for Canterbury Museum. Rolleston was the last Superintendent of Canterbury Province. Russell regained the electorate in the 1899 election with a majority of one vote over Rolleston, which brought an end to that political career. Russell lost the Riccarton electorate again in the 1902 election, this time to George Witty, who held the electorate for 23 years until 1925.

The electorate was contested by three candidates in the 1922 election. George Witty was successful, with Bert Kyle coming second and Jack McCullough coming third.

In the 1938 election, Labour's Thomas Herbert Langford came very close to defeating the National incumbent, Bert Kyle. Before the counting of the absentee and postal votes, Langford was leading by 38 votes. The final count saw Kyle with a majority of 87 votes.

=== Members of Parliament ===
The Riccarton electorate was represented by eight Members of Parliament.

Key

Liberal Conservative Independent Liberal
Reform Independent National Labour

Election	Winner
1893 election	George Russell
1896 election	William Rolleston
1899 election	George Russell
1902 election	George Witty
1905 election	George Witty
1908 election	George Witty
1911 election	George Witty
1914 election	George Witty
1919 election	George Witty
1922 election	George Witty
1925 election	Bert Kyle
1928 election	Bert Kyle
1931 election	Bert Kyle
1935 election	Bert Kyle
1938 election	Bert Kyle
1943 election	Jack Watts
1946 election	Angus McLagan
1949 election	Angus McLagan
1951 election	Angus McLagan
1954 election	Angus McLagan
1956 by-election	Mick Connelly
1957 election	Mick Connelly
1960 election	Mick Connelly
1963 election	Mick Connelly
1966 election	Mick Connelly
1969 election	Eric Holland
1972 election	Eric Holland
1975 election	Eric Holland
(Electorate abolished 1978)

== Election results ==
=== 1975 election ===
1975 general election: Riccarton
Party	Candidate	Votes	%	±%
National	Eric Holland	10,937	57.24	+3.87
Labour	Don Johnson	6,171	32.29	
Values	Beverley Hughes	1,440	7.53	
Social Credit	Jim Biggs	503	2.63	+0.32
Imperial British Conservative	Brian Downham	55	0.28	
Majority		4,766	24.94	+12.72
Turnout		19,106	83.49	−8.17
Registered electors		22,882		

=== 1972 election ===
1972 general election: Riccarton
Party	Candidate	Votes	%	±%
National	Eric Holland	9,451	53.37	−2.35
Labour	David Jackson	7,287	41.15	
Values	Peter Lusk	441	2.49	
Social Credit	Jim Biggs	410	2.31	
New Democratic	Charles Cullen	91	0.51	−4.51
Independent	Earl Sydney William Constable	26	0.14	
Majority		2,164	12.22	−4.25
Turnout		17,706	91.66	+0.41
Registered electors		19,317		

=== 1969 election ===
1969 general election: Riccarton
Party	Candidate	Votes	%	±%
National	Eric Holland	9,942	55.72	
Labour	Alan C. McEwen	7,003	39.25	
Social Credit	Charles Cullen	897	5.02	−6.72
Majority		2,939	16.47	
Turnout		17,842	91.25	+4.27
Registered electors		19,551		

=== 1966 election ===
1966 general election: Riccarton
Party	Candidate	Votes	%	±%
Labour	Mick Connelly	8,834	52.17	−2.38
National	Ian Wilson	6,109	36.07	−2.44
Social Credit	Charles Cullen	1,989	11.74	+4.82
Majority		2,725	16.09	+0.05
Turnout		16,932	86.98	−2.82
Registered electors		19,466		

=== 1963 election ===
1963 general election: Riccarton
Party	Candidate	Votes	%	±%
Labour	Mick Connelly	8,670	54.55	−6.42
National	Ian Wilson	6,120	38.51	
Social Credit	Charles Cullen	1,101	6.92	−0.52
Majority		2,550	16.04	+1.27
Turnout		15,891	89.80	−11.04
Registered electors		17,695		

=== 1960 election ===
1960 general election: Riccarton
Party	Candidate	Votes	%	±%
Labour	Mick Connelly	8,342	60.97	+3.45
National	Deena V. Sergel	4,320	31.57	−5.66
Social Credit	Charles Cullen	1,019	7.44	
Majority		2,022	14.77	−5.52
Turnout		13,681	78.76	−13.29
Registered electors		17,370		

=== 1957 election ===
1957 general election: Riccarton
Party	Candidate	Votes	%	±%
Labour	Mick Connelly	8,128	57.52	−3.93
National	Deena V. Sergel	5,261	37.23	
Social Credit	Jesse Colechin	740	5.23	
Majority		2,867	20.29	+15.51
Turnout		14,129	92.05	+25.77
Registered electors		15,348		

=== 1956 by-election ===
1956 Riccarton by-election
Party	Candidate	Votes	%	±%
Labour	Mick Connelly	6,549	61.45	
National	Balfour Dingwall	2,691	25.25	−0.96
Social Credit	Wilfrid Owen	1,379	12.94	
Ind. Social Credit	Ernest Yealands	28	0.26	
Independent	Richard Grenfell	11	0.10	
Informal votes		40	0.37	
Majority		3,858	36.20	
Turnout		10,698	66.28	−24.33
Registered electors		16,140		
Labour hold		Swing		

=== 1954 election ===
1954 general election: Riccarton
Party	Candidate	Votes	%	±%
Labour	Angus McLagan	8,195	56.03	−1.64
National	Balfour Dingwall	3,832	26.19	
Social Credit	Jesse Colechin	2,599	17.76	
Majority		4,343	29.69	+14.34
Turnout		14,626	90.61	+3.30
Registered electors		16,140		

=== 1951 election ===
1951 general election: Riccarton
Party	Candidate	Votes	%	±%
Labour	Angus McLagan	8,506	57.67	−0.83
National	Eric Philip Wills	6,241	42.32	
Majority		2,265	15.35	−3.03
Turnout		14,747	87.31	−4.34
Registered electors		16,889		

=== 1949 election ===
1949 general election: Riccarton
Party	Candidate	Votes	%	±%
Labour	Angus McLagan	8,613	58.50	−5.22
National	Harry Lake	5,906	40.11	
Communist	Ronald Taylor	204	1.38	
Majority		2,707	18.38	−9.13
Turnout		14,723	91.65	−0.24
Registered electors		16,063		

=== 1946 election ===
1946 general election: Riccarton
Party	Candidate	Votes	%	±%
Labour	Angus McLagan	8,974	63.72	
National	Vic Wilson	5,109	36.27	
Majority		3,875	27.51	
Turnout		14,083	91.89	
Registered electors		15,325		

=== 1943 election ===
There were four candidates in 1943, with the election won by Jack Watts over Harold Ernest Denton.

=== 1931 election ===
1931 general election: Riccarton
Party	Candidate	Votes	%	±%
Reform	Bert Kyle	4,355	40.09	−2.28
Independent	Archibald McLachlan (Note: For some biographical details of McLachlan refer to his grandfather's article)	3,766	34.67	−7.28
Labour	George Thomas Thurston	2,741	25.23	
Majority		589	5.42	+5.00
Informal votes		67	0.61	−0.21
Turnout		10,929	87.24	−2.84
Registered electors		12,528		

Table footnotes:

=== 1928 election ===
1928 general election: Riccarton
Party	Candidate	Votes	%	±%
Reform	Bert Kyle	4,515	42.37	
United	Archibald McLachlan (Note: For some biographical details of McLachlan refer to his grandfather's article)	4,470	41.95	
Labour	George Hartley Thompson	1,671	15.68	
Majority		45	0.42	
Informal votes		88	0.82	
Turnout		10,744	90.07	
Registered electors		11,928		

Table footnotes:

=== 1919 election ===
1919 general election: Riccarton
Party	Candidate	Votes	%	±%
Liberal	George Witty	2,948	40.74	
Reform	William Russell Devereux	2,322	32.09	
Labour	John Robertson	1,966	27.17	
Majority		626	8.65	
Informal votes		89	1.22	
Turnout		7,325	84.97	
Registered electors		8,621		

=== 1905 election ===
1905 general election: Riccarton
Party	Candidate	Votes	%	±%
Liberal	George Witty	2,294	55.54	
Conservative	Thomas Caverhill	1,054	25.52	
Independent Liberal	George Russell	679	16.44	
Liberal–Labour	John Ash Efford	103	2.49	
Majority		1,240	30.02	
Informal votes		66	1.57	
Turnout		4,196	84.12	
Registered electors		4,988		

=== 1899 election ===
1899 general election: Riccarton
Party	Candidate	Votes	%	±%
Liberal	George Russell	1,867	50.01	+5.98
Conservative	William Rolleston	1,866	49.99	−5.98
Majority		1	0.03	−11.90
Turnout		3,733	81.42	+1.88
Registered electors		4,585		

=== 1896 election ===
1896 general election: Riccarton
Party	Candidate	Votes	%	±%
Conservative	William Rolleston	1,834	55.97	
Liberal	George Russell	1,443	44.03	
Majority		391	11.93	
Turnout		3,277	79.54	
Registered electors		4,120		
