= George Russell (New Zealand politician) =

New Zealand politician (1854–1937)

The Honourable George Russell
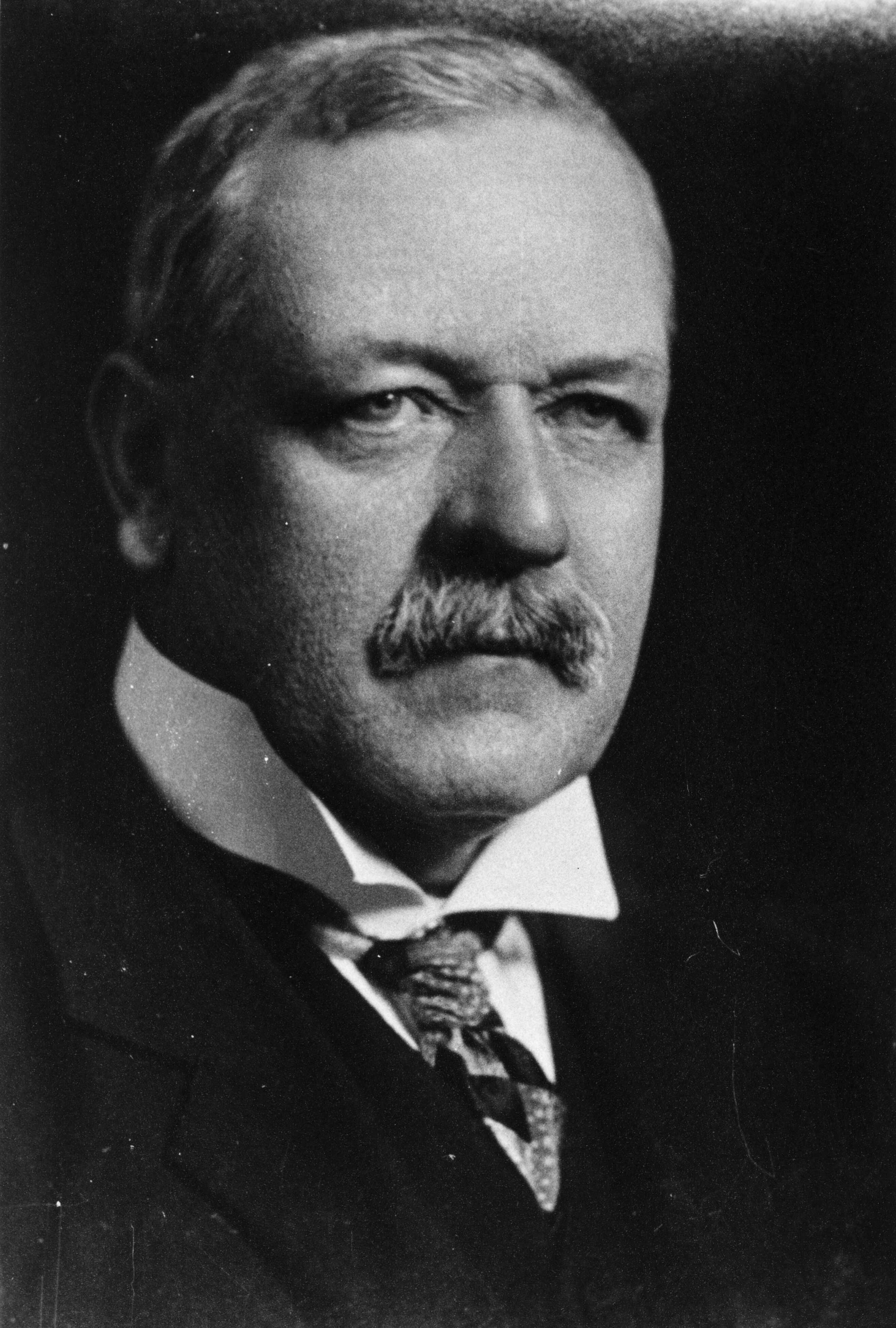
- Russell c. 1919

4th Minister of Public Health
- In office 12 August 1915 – 25 August 1919
- Prime Minister: William Massey
- Preceded by: Heaton Rhodes
- Succeeded by: Francis Bell
- In office 28 March 1912 – 10 July 1912
- Prime Minister: Thomas Mackenzie
- Preceded by: David Buddo
- Succeeded by: Heaton Rhodes

Member of the New Zealand Parliament for Avon
- In office 2 December 1908 – 17 December 1919
- Preceded by: William Tanner
- Succeeded by: Dan Sullivan

Member of the New Zealand Parliament for Riccarton
- In office 6 December 1899 – 25 November 1902
- Preceded by: William Rolleston
- Succeeded by: George Witty
- In office 28 November 1893 – 4 December 1896
- Succeeded by: William Rolleston

Personal details
- Born: George Warren Russell; 24 February 1854 London, England
- Died: 28 June 1937 (aged 83) Eastbourne, New Zealand
- Party: Liberal
- Other political affiliations: Radical Party
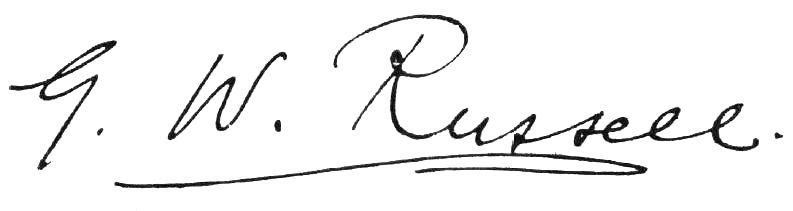
- Signature

George Warren Russell (24 February 1854 – 28 June 1937) was a New Zealand politician from Christchurch. He served as Minister of Internal Affairs and Minister of Public Health in the wartime National government, and was responsible for the New Zealand government's response to the 1918 influenza epidemic.

== Private life ==
Russell was born in London, England, in 1854. His father was a bricklayer and builder. The family emigrated to Tasmania when he was still a child, and then moved again to New Zealand in 1864. Russell worked as an apprentice journalist, before trying to become a Wesleyan Methodist minister. When that was unsuccessful, he returned to journalism, working on the Evening Chronicle in Wellington and founding the Manawatu Herald in Foxton. He moved to Christchurch in 1889. In 1898, he took over the Spectator, a magazine he would edit until 1928.

== Political career ==
New Zealand Parliament
Years	Term	Electorate	Party
1893–1896	12th	Riccarton	Liberal
1899–1902	14th	Riccarton	Liberal
1908–1911	16th	Avon	Liberal
1911–1914	17th	Avon	Liberal
1914–1919	18th	Avon	Liberal

Russell contested the 1881 election in the Foxton electorate, where he was third of six candidates, beaten by James Wilson. He unsuccessfully contested the Waikato electorate in the 1887 election; he was beaten by John Blair Whyte.

He first entered Parliament as MHR for Riccarton in 1893. A member of the Liberal Party's "left" (radical) wing, he was a strong critic of Premier Richard Seddon, and at the 1896 election attempted to form a Radical Party to push for stronger reforms. He maintained only a tenuous hold on his electorate, losing it in 1896 to William Rolleston, but regaining it in 1899 with a majority of one vote over Rolleston, which brought an end to that political career. Russell lost the Riccarton electorate again in 1902. In 1908, he won the Avon electorate, and held it for the next 11 years.

Russell was considered a possible Liberal leader in 1912 when Sir Joseph Ward resigned, and served in the cabinet of Thomas Mackenzie. He later served in the wartime National cabinet with the Reform Party, holding the portfolios of Internal Affairs, Public Health and Hospitals, as well as a number of lesser responsibilities. Russell was one of the biggest proponents in the Liberal caucus to abandon the National Coalition with Reform. After the caucus voted to leave, he worked with William MacDonald and Thomas Wilford to develop an updated policy manifesto for the next election while Ward was returning to New Zealand from Europe. In his role as Minister of Public Health, he was responsible for the decision to allow RMS Niagara to dock in Auckland in October 1918, and was blamed for the resulting Spanish flu epidemic which killed at least 8,000 New Zealanders. As a result, he lost his electorate in the 1919 election. He unsuccessfully contested the 1921 by-election for Auckland East, and Avon again in the 1922 general election, but was never again elected to Parliament.

In 1935, Russell was awarded the King George V Silver Jubilee Medal.

== Death ==
Russell died on 28 June 1937 in Eastbourne, Wellington. He was buried at Holy Trinity Avonside in Christchurch.

== Notes ==
New Zealand Parliament
New constituency	Member of Parliament for Riccarton; 1893–1896 1899–1902	Succeeded by William Rolleston
Preceded by William Rolleston	Member of Parliament for Riccarton; 1893–1896 1899–1902	Succeeded by George Witty
Preceded by William Tanner	Member of Parliament for Avon; 1908–1919	Succeeded by Dan Sullivan
Political offices
Preceded by David Buddo	Minister of Public Health; 1912 1915–1919	Succeeded by Heaton Rhodes
Preceded by Heaton Rhodes	Minister of Public Health; 1912 1915–1919	Succeeded by Francis Bell
Academic offices
Preceded by Charles Lewis	Chairman of the Board of Governors of Canterbury College; 1907–1910	Succeeded by Jonathan Charles Adams
