= Bert Kyle =

New Zealand politician

Bert Kyle OBE
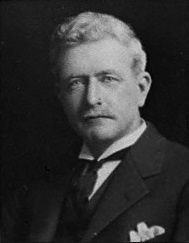

Member of the New Zealand Parliament for Riccarton
- In office 1925–1943
- Preceded by: George Witty
- Succeeded by: Jack Watts

Personal details
- Born: Herbert Seton Stewart Kyle; 29 August 1873 Brunswick, Victoria, Australia
- Died: 5 January 1955 (aged 81) Christchurch, New Zealand
- Party: Reform (1922–36); National (1936–42); Independent (1942–43)
- Occupation: Veterinary surgeon Farmer

Herbert Seton Stewart Kyle OBE (29 August 1873 – 5 January 1955) was a member of the Reform Party and since 1936 National Party Member of Parliament in New Zealand.

== Early life and profession ==
Kyle was born in Brunswick, Melbourne, Australia, in 1873. He received his education from The Geelong College and the Melbourne Veterinary College. He was a vet in Ballarat until 1899, when he migrated to New Zealand.

He was a New Zealand government vet in Christchurch from 1901 to 1918. Afterwards, he had his private practice in Christchurch.

== Member of Parliament ==
New Zealand Parliament
Years	Term	Electorate	Party
1925–1928	22nd	Riccarton	Reform
1928–1931	23rd	Riccarton	Reform
1931–1935	24th	Riccarton	Reform
1935–1936	25th	Riccarton	Reform
1936–1938	Changed allegiance to:		National
1938–1942	26th	Riccarton	National
1942–1943	Changed allegiance to:		Independent

The Christchurch electorate of Riccarton was contested by three candidates in the 1922 election. George Witty was successful, with Kyle coming second and Jack McCullough coming third. Kyle won the Riccarton electorate in the 1925 election, and held it to 1943 when he was defeated (he withdrew).

=== Independent ===
Kyle resigned from the National Party in 1942. He stated: "The National Party organization has built up a watertight compartment that makes one become a 'yes man' with expulsion as an alternative". Kyle thought it "better to retire from the party than to place on it the onus of expulsion, a point which the gentleman (Sid Holland) who moved the resolution was expounding when I left the caucus meeting". Kyle remained an independent until 1943, but did not contest the election in that year.

In 1935, Kyle was awarded the King George V Silver Jubilee Medal. He was appointed an Officer of the Order of the British Empire, for public and local government services, in the 1953 New Year Honours, and later in 1953 was awarded the Queen Elizabeth II Coronation Medal.

== Death ==
Kyle died on 5 January 1955, and was buried in Bromley Cemetery.

== Notes ==
New Zealand Parliament
Preceded by George Witty	Member of Parliament for Riccarton; 1925–1943	Succeeded by Jack Watts
