= Radical Party (New Zealand) =

The Radical Party was a proposed new political party in New Zealand. It was part of an abortive attempt by members of the Liberal Party to establish a breakaway group. No actual party was ever formed, but the name was frequently applied to the group of dissident MPs by the press.

The leaders of the Radical Party proposal were George Russell and Frederick Pirani, both Liberal Party MPs. Russell and Pirani, along with other MPs such as William Collins and George Smith, were dissatisfied with the Liberal Party under Richard Seddon, believing that it had lost its commitment to its founding ideals. Both were considered to belong to the Liberal Party's left wing. In 1896, Russell spoke openly about formalising "the advanced section of the Liberal Party," either as an organised faction in the Liberal caucus or as a separate party.

However, the new group failed to emerge. Tensions appeared to rise between its various members, with rumours circulating that neither Russell nor Pirani would concede the leadership to the other. The MPs whose names had been mentioned in connection with the Radical Party distanced themselves from it, stating that they had never made any commitments. Pirani and Smith both left the Liberal Party the same year, becoming independents.

In 1905 a similar group, the New Liberal Party was formed, but this group was defunct by 1908.
