= George Witty =

New Zealand politician

The Honourable George Witty
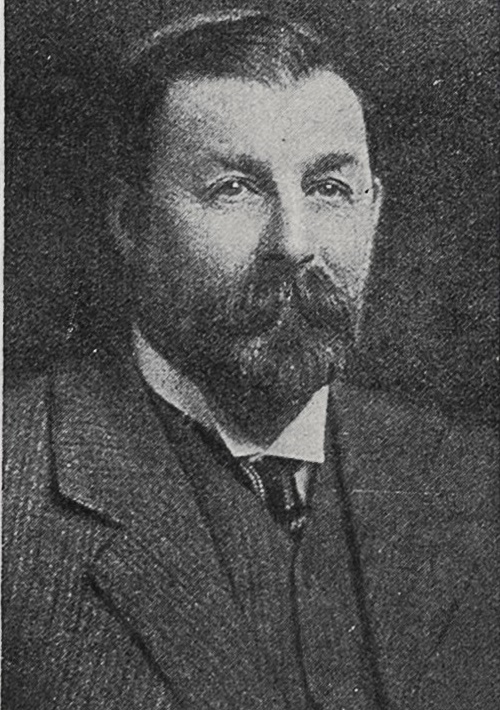

Member of the New Zealand Parliament for Riccarton
- In office 1902–1925
- Preceded by: George Russell
- Succeeded by: Bert Kyle

Personal details
- Born: 1856 North Ferriby
- Died: 21 November 1941 (aged 85)
- Party: Liberal

George Witty (1856 – 21 November 1941) was a New Zealand Member of Parliament for Riccarton, in the South Island.

== Early life ==
He was born in North Ferriby, in the East Riding of Yorkshire, England and came to New Zealand in 1875 with two shillings in his pocket. He was a farmer and a director of the local sale yards company in Christchurch.

== Member of Parliament ==
New Zealand Parliament
| Years | Term | Electorate | Party |
|---|---|---|---|
| 1902–1905 | 15th | Riccarton | Independent Liberal |
| 1905–1908 | 16th | Riccarton | Liberal |
| 1908–1911 | 17th | Riccarton | Liberal |
| 1911–1914 | 18th | Riccarton | Liberal |
| 1914–1919 | 19th | Riccarton | Liberal |
| 1919–1922 | 20th | Riccarton | Liberal |
| 1922–1925 | 21st | Riccarton | Independent Liberal |

Witty was endorsed by the New Zealand Farmers' Union to stand as an Independent Liberal in the Riccarton electorate. He was successful and represented the Riccarton in the New Zealand House of Representatives for twenty three years from 1902 to 1925. Witty was then a Liberal Party MP but at the 1922 election he stood again as an Independent Liberal and was successful.

Witty was a member of the Legislative Council from 1925 to 28 October 1932. Witty and Leonard Isitt were both appointed to the Legislative Council by Gordon Coates on 28 October 1925; shortly before the 1925 election on 4 November. Both were Liberals but their retirement removed "a source of some bitterness from the Party's ranks (Coates rewarded them with seats in the Legislative Council the day after the election)". Gordon Coates was Reform, and both of their former seats went to Reform candidates.

After Witty, Bert Kyle of the Reform Party represented the Riccarton electorate.

In 1935, Witty was awarded the King George V Silver Jubilee Medal. He received the King George VI Coronation Medal in 1937, and served as chairman of the Paparua County Council.

== Death ==
Witty died in Christchurch on 21 November 1941, aged 85 years.

New Zealand Parliament
| Preceded by George Russell | Member of Parliament for Riccarton; 1902–1925 | Succeeded by Bert Kyle |
