= Populism in New Zealand =

During the 1990s New Zealand saw a growth in populism, a political trend whose advocates claim to work for "the people" rather than for the "elite". The rise of populism in the country has been attributed to the introduction of the mixed-member proportional electoral system, as well as to the populist nature of election campaigns, such as that of the Labour Party in the lead-up to the 1999 election. The New Zealand First party, which has historically taken a nationalist standpoint, has been described as a populist party.

== History ==
Robert Muldoon, the 31st Prime Minister of New Zealand from 1975 to 1984, had been cited as a populist leader who appealed to the common man and utilised a personality-driven campaign in the 1975 election.

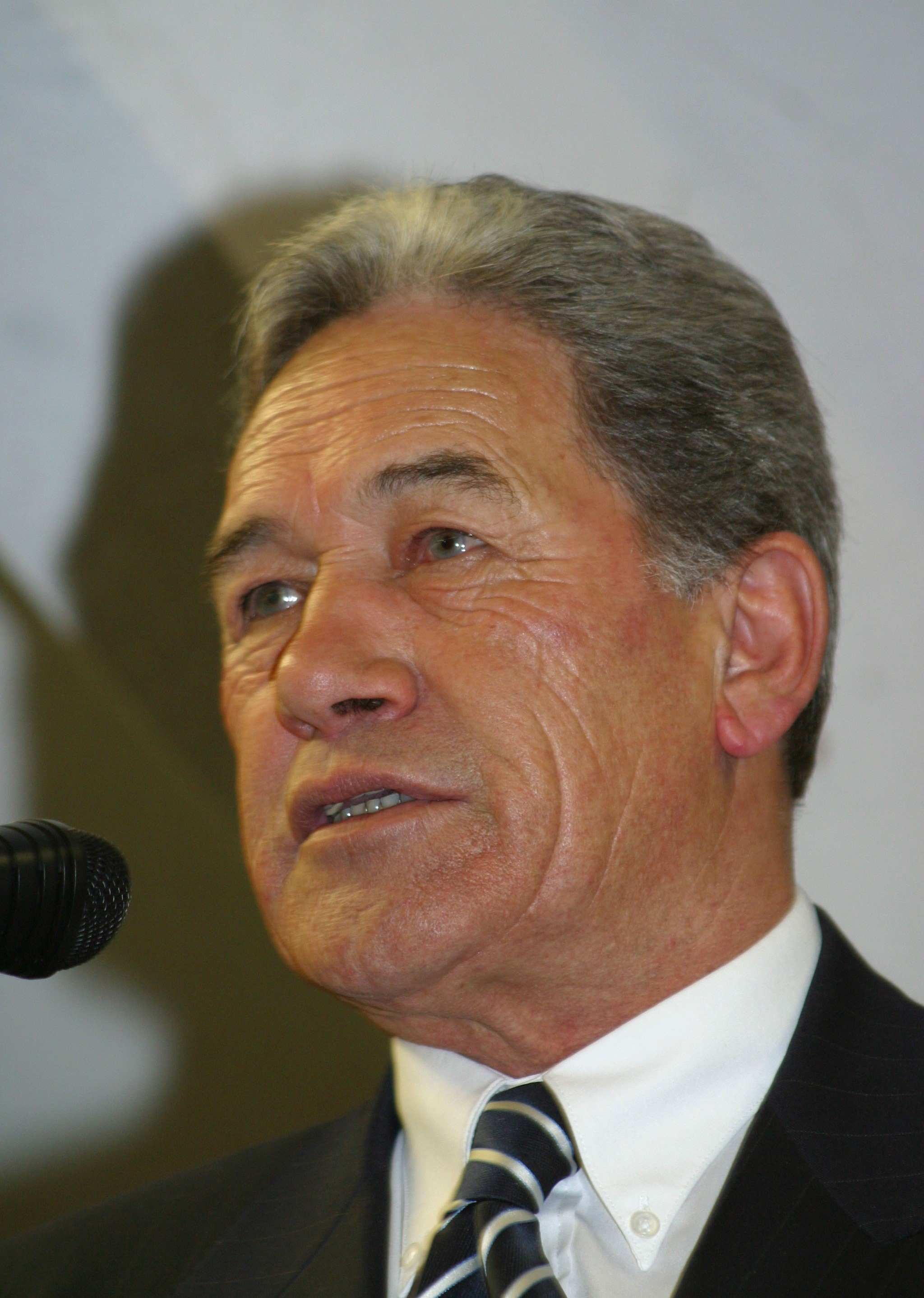
Populist leader Winston Peters of the New Zealand First party

Populism has become a pervasive trend in New Zealand politics since the introduction of the mixed-member proportional voting system in 1996. The New Zealand Labour Party's populist appeals in its 1999 election campaign and advertising helped to propel the party to victory in that election. Labour also articulated populism in its 2002 election campaign, helping return the party to government, despite its being entrenched as part of the establishment under attack by other parties employing strongly populist strategies, drawing on their outsider status. Those parties—New Zealand First and United Future—benefited greatly in 2002 from running almost textbook populist advertising campaigns, which helped both parties increase their proportion of the party vote to levels unanticipated at the commencement of the election campaign. The New Zealand National Party made limited attempts at articulating populism in its advertising, but suffered from the legacy of being part of the 1990s establishment. The ACT New Zealand party, under leaders Richard Prebble and Rodney Hide, made attempts at populist appeal with socially conservative policies on crime and affirmative action, often to the consternation of its classical liberal wing.

In preparation for the 2005 election, then-leader of the National Party Don Brash delivered the Orewa Speech in 2004 on allegations of Māori privilege. This speech has been labelled populist due to the polling beforehand which had revealed to the National Party that the topic of race relations was sensitive enough to sway voters, and its perceived intent to exploit long-held grievances in society. The success in the polls granted to the National Party by this speech led to the delivery of a speech dubbed "Orewa 2" the next year, this time on welfare dependency. This second attempt at a populist speech was less successful as voters perceived it as such.

== Modern politics ==
New Zealand First 2014 General Election Results by Electorate

New Zealand First has presented a more lasting populist platform. Long-time party leader Winston Peters has been characterised by some as a populist who uses anti-establishment rhetoric, though in a uniquely New Zealand style. New Zealand First takes a centrist approach to economic issues, typical of populist parties, while advocating conservative positions on social issues. Political commentators dispute the party's classification on the ideological spectrum, but state that its dominant attribute is populism. The party's strong opposition to immigration, and policies that reflect that position, as well as its support for multiple popular referendums, all typify its broadly populist approach. Peters has been criticised for reputedly inciting anti-immigration sentiment and capitalising on immigration fears—he has highlighted the threat of immigration in both economic and cultural terms. Some academics, such as John Moore, contend that New Zealand First uses populist rhetoric, in common with parties such as UKIP in Britain.

New Zealand First lost all their seats at the 2020 New Zealand general election.

In the 2010s and 2020s, numerous parties outside of Parliament emerged with strong, often conspiracy theory-influenced, populist platforms. Stuff named Advance New Zealand, the New Conservative Party, New Zealand Public Party, and Vision NZ as parties which "used misinformation and/or divisive far-right rhetoric throughout their 2020 election campaigns." However to date none of these parties has been elected to Parliament.

New Zealand First won 8 seats at the 2023 New Zealand general election and joined the incoming Government.

Political experts have said that a reason why New Zealand hasn't seen the growth of a far-right populist party like in European nations is because the more moderate New Zealand First takes the political space that a far right party would naturally have (ie. anti-immigration policies).

== See also ==
- Politics of New Zealand
- Socialism in New Zealand
- List of political parties in New Zealand
