= 1908 Blackball miners' strike =

Labour dispute in New Zealand

The 1908 Blackball miners' strike was industrial action that happened when seven miners in the small town of Blackball, on New Zealand's West Coast, were dismissed for taking longer than their allocated fifteen minutes ('crib time'), for lunch. This was one of many issues that were causing discontent within the coal-mining industry that was set up as a series of capitalist enterprises to meet the shipping needs of Britain as an imperial power. When Blackball township was established, the mining company provided low-quality living and working conditions for the miners and after the town became populated by immigrants with union experience overseas, some of the grievances that eventually resulted in the strike emerged. The strike has been seen as a formative event in New Zealand history because of the successful outcome for the miners from the eleven-week strike by the use of direct action and organised unionism. This was the first real challenge to the Arbitration Court, set up under legislation by the Liberal Government in 1894 to support mediation in industrial disputes, and highlighted the difficulties of getting a resolution because of the wide range of political, social and cultural factors that resulted in a degree of intransigence by both the miners and the mine company. A number of the leading strikers subsequently became leaders in the political labour movement.

== Background ==
Mining for coal in New Zealand came into prominence in the period between 1875 and 1914 described by one historian as the "Age of the Empire" when the British imperial capitalist system shaped the New Zealand economic, cultural and social landscape. With an increase in the shipping of passengers and frozen meat between Britain and New Zealand, British maritime interests needed an independent coal supply. This brought about a change in the New Zealand economy. It had been driven previously by agriculture and from the 1860s, by gold mining, but to meet the demands of the shipping trade, finance was needed for infrastructure and investment in public works such as improved railway networks. This finance was available from Britain and allowed a more centralised development plan for the country than the provincial governments had been able to provide. While this created dependence on an imperialistic relationship with Britain that was built on heightened loyalty, the investment in public works enabled the practical development of the coal mining industry. The accentuation of class and regional differences in the interests of financial gain, however, contributed to later industrial relations conflicts that led to actions such as the 1908 Blackball Miners’ strike.

=== Blackball as a mining town ===
Early European settlement of the area was the result of gold mining, beginning around 1866. A Greymouth businessman, Joseph Kilgour, who had mining rights in the area in 1877, later found some seams of coal, and a group of locals advised in 1884 that they were applying for rights to prospect in a site adjacent to Kilgour's. The Black Ball Creek Coal Company (BBCCC) was registered on 14 January 1885 but by 1886, after transfer of the leases, The Black Ball Coal Company (BCC) was established with a board based in Christchurch. In 1892 the company was underwritten by British financiers, the Black Ball Shipping Company of England which retained the Christchurch directors, and the Black Ball Coal Mining Company of New Zealand (BBCMC of NZ Ltd) was established. Members of the Christchurch-based Board of Directors had some reservations about managing the "interests of overseas owners", and the miners were said to have held the company in "low regard". Nevertheless, the renamed Blackball Coal Mining Company (Limited), established a coal mine in 1893, and "the township of Blackball (named after the company) was laid out, and sections were auctioned".

The company's prospects were looking good in 1893 with the completion of a 4.5 km-long aerial ropeway across the Grey River as a conveyance to connect with rail at Ngahere. A writer in New Zealand Geographic noted that "shareholders in Christchurch and London had reason to feel confident, with confirmed demand for 100,000 tonnes of coal per year and a colonial government which boasted internationally of a strike-free record among workers".

The demographic of Blackball was to have significance during later disputes with the company. By 1908 the town had a population around 380, with about 150 being miners, although this could rise considerably during busy periods for the mine. There is documentation that shows around 50 per cent of the residents in 1908 were likely to have been descendants of settlers from the coalfields of England, some of whom would have had a background in British unionism [and] "a commitment and determination to improve conditions in the workplace". The same historian suggests that their approach would be "pragmatic and opportunistic not ideological...[and]...occupational identity and union solidarity was the key". The writer continues that immigrants from coalmines in Scotland were said to have brought an independence to struggles with capitalist employers and less of an inclination to develop "partnerships between capital and labour". A third group of immigrants came from Ireland, some via the gold mines in Australia, and they appear to have been able to adapt well to the "casual nature of employment that prevailed in Blackball". It is held in the historiography [that] "the extremes of miner militancy that developed in Blackball owed much to the previous experience and perceptions of these immigrant miners...[and]...circumstances and events at Blackball tended to reinforce rather than lessen their sense of struggle". As a result, there appears to have been "a high level of class-consciousness and a heightened sense of community".

Housing conditions in Blackball were poor in what was seen as an abduction of duty on the part of the Mining Company to provide adequate living conditions for the workers. Houses were said to have been "sparsely furnished", without facilities to dry clothes and water supplies where were often "contaminated with soot...[while]...the water to the miner manager's and the comp any officials' houses ran fresh and clean from a tributary of Blackball Creek".

=== Rising discontent ===
In spite of the Company apparently doing well, there was a growing discontent amongst the miners. As well as low pay, 10 hours underground every day and a short lunch break, the work was extremely dangerous. Miners regularly had to be wary of rockfalls, blastings and the "hazards of makeshift heavy gear". Some miners were said to have suffered from silicosis, caused by fine particles that settled in the lungs, caused by "firedamp (dangerously explosive methane), rising damp (carbon dioxide, which penetrated the skin), water damp (moisture full of sulphuric acid) and blackdamp (fumes of poisonous hydrogen sulphide)".

Mining, as integral to a capitalist system meeting the laws of supply and demand, often manifested in Blackball as casual employment arrangements. These were sometimes governed by expectations miners would work double shifts to minimise the number of days they were required to work. But these fluctuations in labour and the uncertain nature of dismissals, were a concern for miners.

Historian Erik Olssen notes that in 1904, after losing a significant amount of money in previous years, the Blackball Mining Company dismissed all the miners, later to re-employ half of them. During 1905 most miners worked only one day a week and had to supplement their income by "growing vegetables, running a few hens, and perhaps a cow...and working where possible as casual labourers in timber mills or on public works projects". The union effectively collapsed and although economic conditions had improved by 1907, the miners were "exhausted and suspicious....[and]...remembered other grievances with the company". One of these was a claim that the miners were being underpaid because of inaccurate measures of the tub weights, confirmed in the Otago Daily Times on 4 May 1908, with a report that the management agreed with the miners.

== The industrial action ==
=== Decision to strike ===
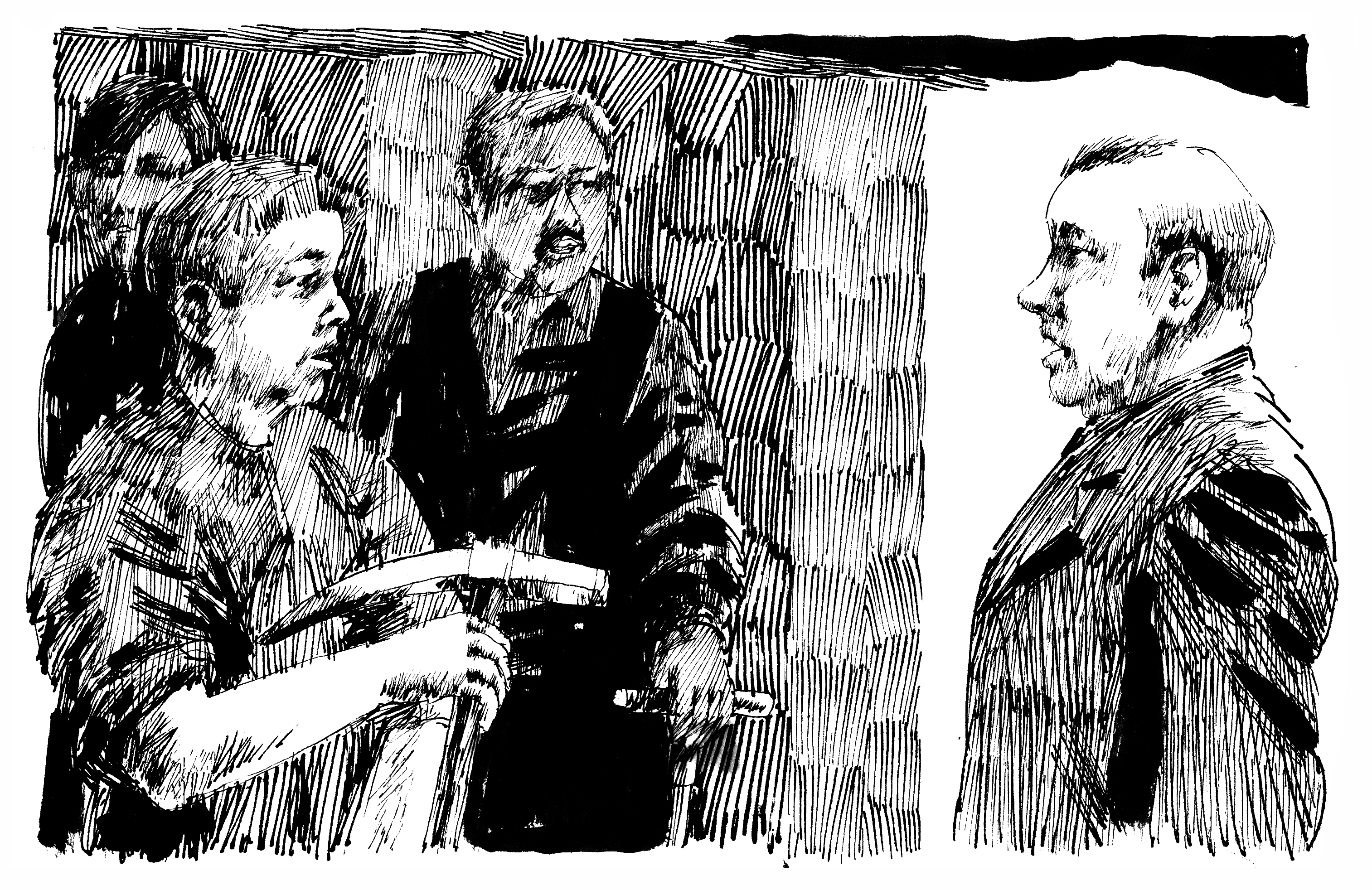
A drawing of miners confronting their manager during the strike

The Blackball Miner's Union had been formed in 1899 and was registered under the Industrial Conciliation and Arbitration Act, with their award agreement entitling them to only 15 minutes for their 'crib' or lunch break. At the time there were miners present at Blackball who had been involved in militant action in other mines, including Patrick Hickey and Paddy Webb, and there was a growing discontent amongst the miners about aspects of the award, including the length of the working day, and the issue of a short time for lunch. Early in February 1908, Hickey refused to comply with this and subsequently appeared in court for not following his manager's instructions. On 27 February Hickey, Webb and five miners who were members of the recently formed Socialist Branch, also refused to accept the 15-minute break, and all were dismissed by the manager Walter Leitch. It has been said that Leitch was influenced in making this decision because Hickey had taken a group of unionists to meet with the then Minister of Labour, Robert McNab the previous day. At that meeting Hickey spoke strongly about "poor ventilation, violation of the Coal Mines Act, and the refusal of government inspectors to enforce the law." The miners' union met and decided that unless the Company could provide a satisfactory reason for dismissing the men, they would all have to re-employed and compensated for time lost. Leitch met with the union delegates on 27 February and attempted to explain why he had made the decision to dismiss the men. He also made an offer to reinstate the men without paying them compensation for lost time, but members of the union rejected this with a vote 125-5 against the proposal. When the union added another demand to which Leitch did not agree, the strike began.

=== Support from other unions ===
There was mixed support for the strike from other unions around New Zealand. A meeting of the Grey Wharf Workers Union criticised the action of the Blackball miners, overwhelmingly voting in favour of them returning to work, and the Otago Trades and Labour Council advised "affiliated unions [against granting] assistance to the Blackball miners". Tyneside miners later voted by a large majority to not support the strike and the Brunner Miners' Union moved a motion that the action of the Blackball minors constituted a breach of the Industrial Arbitration and Conciliation Act, with an amendment adding: "That we respectfully request the management to refrain from supplying orders from the Blackball Coal Company." At a meeting of the Canterbury Trades and Labour Council however, support for the miners was tabled by the Tailoring Trade Union, while "the Plasterers, General Labourers, Freezer, Slaughtermen's Assistants and Moulders wrote to the same effect". The Lyttelton Casual Wharf Labourers' Union offered a donation to the strikers, but said it did not agree with the action as it went against the law of the land, and the Typographical Union wrote that it "disagreed with the Blackball Union for going out on strike".

== The arbitration process ==
The 1894 Industrial Conciliation and Arbitration Act was drawn up by William Pember Reeves in an attempt by the Liberal government in New Zealand to avoid future strikes such as the 1890 Aucklander Watersiders' action in support of a dispute in Australia. It was not compulsory for unions to register under the Act, but those that did, were required to attend compulsory arbitration and not strike "while a dispute was being negotiated and once an agreement had been settled", with employers not able to impose lockdowns. Some powerful unions disliked losing the right to strike and employers opposed judges making decisions about wages and working condition, "instead of relying on the labour market".

=== Conflicting views on arbitration ===
Some members of the miners' union were unsupportive of the arbitration. Hickey, Webb and George Hunter, who established the Socialist Party in the town have been described as "the three Australian agitators [who] had come to the town with the express purpose of making trouble - not just for the owners of the Blackball mine, but for the whole system of compulsory industrial conciliation and arbitration for which New Zealand was internationally renowned". Hickey was outspoken in his opposition to the legislation. He claimed that unions meekly accepted decisions by the Court within an arbitration system, that had "many absurdities...[and]...was rather one-sided in its outlook". It is a measure of how influential Hickey was, that after he provided information to the Westland Trades and Labour Council, they concluded on 4 March 1908, that the miners had been treated unfairly and strongly criticised the methods used by the Arbitration Court. It has been argued that the "youthful enthusiasm and audacity" of Hickey and the other radicals won over the "more conservative and cautious miners" who agreed to a strike they knew was illegal. The same historian holds that the strike possibly gained national prominence partly because of this, but also due to the "defiant attitude towards the Arbitration Court" and blatant use of the courts to "publicise their anti-arbitration position".

There were socialists who supported arbitration. One, Jack McCullough who had a background in unionism and support of socialism, was nominated to be the union's representative on the Arbitration Court in 1907. Following the stand taken by the Westland Trades and Labour Council on 4 March 1908 against the way the Arbitration Court had conducted its processes during the Blackball strike, McCullough, very aware of the mood of the miners. Nolan holds that McCullough was well placed to deal with "the employers' new doctrine of efficiency, which coincided with a more aggressively anti-union position" that was being led by "an emerging militant managerial elite" led by George Stead and influenced by William Scott, the secretary of the Otago Employers' Association (OEA) who was nominated as the employers' representative on the Arbitration board in 1904. Despite trying unsuccessfully to remove Samuel Brown, Scott remained an influential advocate for employers in the Arbitration court and initiated actions that became a "major concern" for McCullough.

Judge William Sim who presided at the Court was well known to all parties involved in the dispute. When the government announced in 1907 that Sim was to be the first fulltime 'President of the Court', the miners approved of the appointment. This view was soon to change after Sim made a controversial ruling at an earlier dispute at Denniston, that allowed the Court the power to "vary all or any of the provisions of [the] Award in the event of any change being made by legislation". In this case the government intervened and a strike was averted, but Sim made another ruling in a dispute that there would be no Award for the Canterbury Farm Workers' Union. Union leaders saw his decision as a "miscarriage of justice", and McCullough was said to be "flabbergasted". One writer holds, that the Blackball miners may have had some cause to be cynical about Sim because early in the strike at an Arbitration hearing, he "announced 15 minutes adequate for 'crib' before adjourning for an hour and a half for luncheon".

== Resolution timeline ==
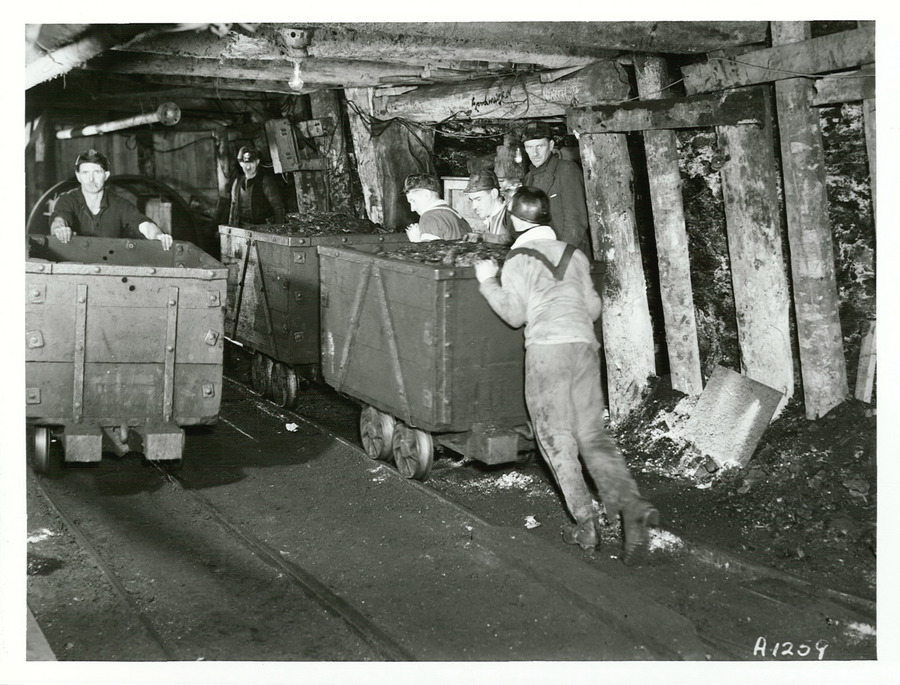
Truckers at work in the Blackball mine

At the first hearing against the miners at the Arbitration on 10 March 1908, the mine manager W. Leitch presented his reasons for the dismissal. It emerged that management had been having issues with the carrying capacity of the aerial tramway that required drivers to work 10-hour shifts to get the required output, and because a ruling by the Arbitration court had put truckers in the same category as miners if they were working underground, they should only be expected to work the 8-hour shifts. It was reported in the Otago Daily Times that this was the reasoning put forward by Leitch in an attempt to justify a 10-hour day by the miners as necessary to get the required amount of coal, and it was claimed that if the 8-hour shifts were enforced, the company would have too many staff to make it financially viable and this was a justification to dismiss the seven miners. The 8-hour day had become a key focus of the strike for both the company and the miners.

On 11 March 1908, the Court issued its decision which said that Leitch, the manager, had provoked the crisis by the dismissals and that the unions had appeared to have been unwilling to engage to engage with those supporting a conciliation, and in not giving the company sufficient notice of their intent to increase the crib time, had acted in a "high-handed and arbitrary manner". It was ruled that the union be fined for breaking the existing industrial law and McCullough did get some acceptance from the union that this was lawful and the fine justified. At a meeting held in confidence between McCullough, the company's representative Samuel Brown and Judge Sim there was considerable discussion about the fine. McCullough argued £25 was fair, Brown insisted on the maximum of £25 and the judge compromised at £75. McCullough later said that his bargaining power was restricted because he was not able to guarantee that the miners would return to work. The money issue was not resolved until 12 May after the strike was over.

At this point, McCullough met with union members and management and attempted to find a resolution to the dispute, effectively acting as a "peacemaker" for over a month. Although within that time a deal which he brokered was later broken by both parties, and McCullough concluded conciliation was impossible, he continued to act as a facilitator and go-between. When Stead made an offer to pay half of the money levied on the miners as a fine, McCullough suggested to the unions that they should respond courteously to this and compromise their position regarding the demands around the hours for truckers. It is claimed that he got little positive response from the employers. This deal broke down, partly due to concerns about breaking of confidences, and resulted in a stalemate that saw unions rejecting the offer and the employers threatening to impose lockouts on other unions supporting the strikers in Blackball. One outcome of this was that Edward Tregear from the Labour Department, had discussions with McCullough and Hickey and on 25 March 1908, it was suggested that the union invite the Minister of Labour to become involved in negotiations between them and Stead - in effect making a political solution to the problem a possibility. The terms offered proposed 30 minutes crib time, the men who had been discharged being reinstated and the Company to pay half the fine. However the executive of the miners' union rejected the offer, without fully consulting the rank and file members. Hickey had supported accepting the offer and at a meeting of the union on 3 April 1908, miners put forward a motion to accept the offer but, this motion as well as one to rescind the original strike, were ruled "out of order" by the chairman.

Between 13 and 15 April 1908, McCullough facilitated a meeting between the union and Stead and while this was said to be "friendly in tone" with a settlement looking possible, nothing was confirmed.

It was significant that on 23 April, union representatives travelled to Christchurch to negotiate directly with the Company directors for the first time. On 27 April the union called a special meeting which offered the condition for a return to work to be that none of the strikers would be victimised, but the issue of the hours of the truckers was unlikely to resolved, with the meeting concluding: "The Blackball Union will accept no agreement which does not embody the eight-hour bank to bank principle".

Further discussions happened on 8 May 1908 with the union, appearing to more accommodating than at the last meeting, suggesting a plan that some miners would roster on to do trucking for two of their eight hours and truckers could work some overtime if it could be justified as "special work". The response from the directors was that was too "fancy", and they wanted a return to all conditions as of 28 February 1908.

The final decision to end the strike has been seen as a pragmatic response to a request for the re-opening of the Blackball mine to compensate for the nearby Tyneside Mine being flooded following high levels of rainfall in the area. This was accepted by miners and company directors on 11 May 1908, and the next day work started at Blackball mine, meaning, with "a double shift of eight hours each for hewers and truckers, thirty minutes for 'crib time and all miners being restored to work", the strike was over.

== Legacy and commemoration ==
The industrial action has been described as "the strike that finally ended New Zealand's reputation as the 'country without strikes'". This was a reference to the fact that in the 10 years following the passing of the Industrial Conciliation and Arbitration Act in 1894, there had been virtually no strikes in the country, although unsatisfactory outcomes for workers in the neighbouring Denniston mines following arbitration under the Act, indicated that by 1905, the legislation was losing favour with some unionists. Along this paradigm of dissatisfaction, the Blackball strike in 1908 widened national attention within New Zealand on the arbitration system. Conservatives expressed concerns about the apparent victory by the miners, while radicals were encouraged and in August 1908 after the strike, a conference of West Coast miners' unions met in Greymouth and formed the New Zealand Federation of Miners, later to be known as the Red Federation of Labour (Red Feds) with Robert Semple elected president and Patrick Hickey as secretary. This signalled the rise of industrial unionism in New Zealand, with some of the leaders of the strike being involved in the formation of the New Zealand Labour Party in 1916. Political commentator Chris Trotter has challenged the narrative that the Blackball strike was the 'birth of the Labour party', which didn't hold its founding conference until 1916. Trotter maintains that "to prevent the Blackball Miners' Strike from becoming an alternative historical touchstone - a reminder of what militant trade unionism and revolutionary socialism could achieve - the founders of the Labour Party shrewdly incorporated it into the creation-myth of their new, moderate, political movement...The revolutionary path had failed: henceforth, the New Zealand working class would follow the 'parliamentary road' to socialism". It has been argued also, that the message, strikes are more effective than arbitration, is mostly a position of strong supporters of unionism or socialism.

The outcome of the arbitration in favour of the miners has been called "a massive blow to the arbitration system" with other unions supporting the Red Feds for the right to negotiate directly with employers. Some changes were made to the legislation in 1908 by John Millar, a former maritime striker and later a Minister of Labour in the government. These included requiring unions and employers in industries classified as essential services, "such as those supplying water, gas, electricity or coal" [to give] "advance notice of any strike or lockout". Despite the amendments some unions refused to return to the arbitration system and many of them, "made up of large groups of workers who relied on each other in difficult and often dangerous conditions", supported the establishment of the first Federation of Labour.

One point made by historian Melanie Nolan in her critique of the historiography of the strike, is that the perspective and experience of the women in the struggle has not been adequately acknowledged or understood. Her claim is that the strike has been seen as primarily a political phenomenon and does not consider the role of socio-economic issues underpinned by class-based determinants resulting in wages that were inadequate to meet the rise in the cost of living. Nolan holds that a consideration of how this related to the family economy would bring women into the narrative, and concludes:

In the last analysis, the strike was less about any particular grievance or long-standing concern. It was altogether more ambitious: it was about the rising expectations of workers who wanted something more than the industrial relations system was delivering. It was about aspiration as much as ideology.

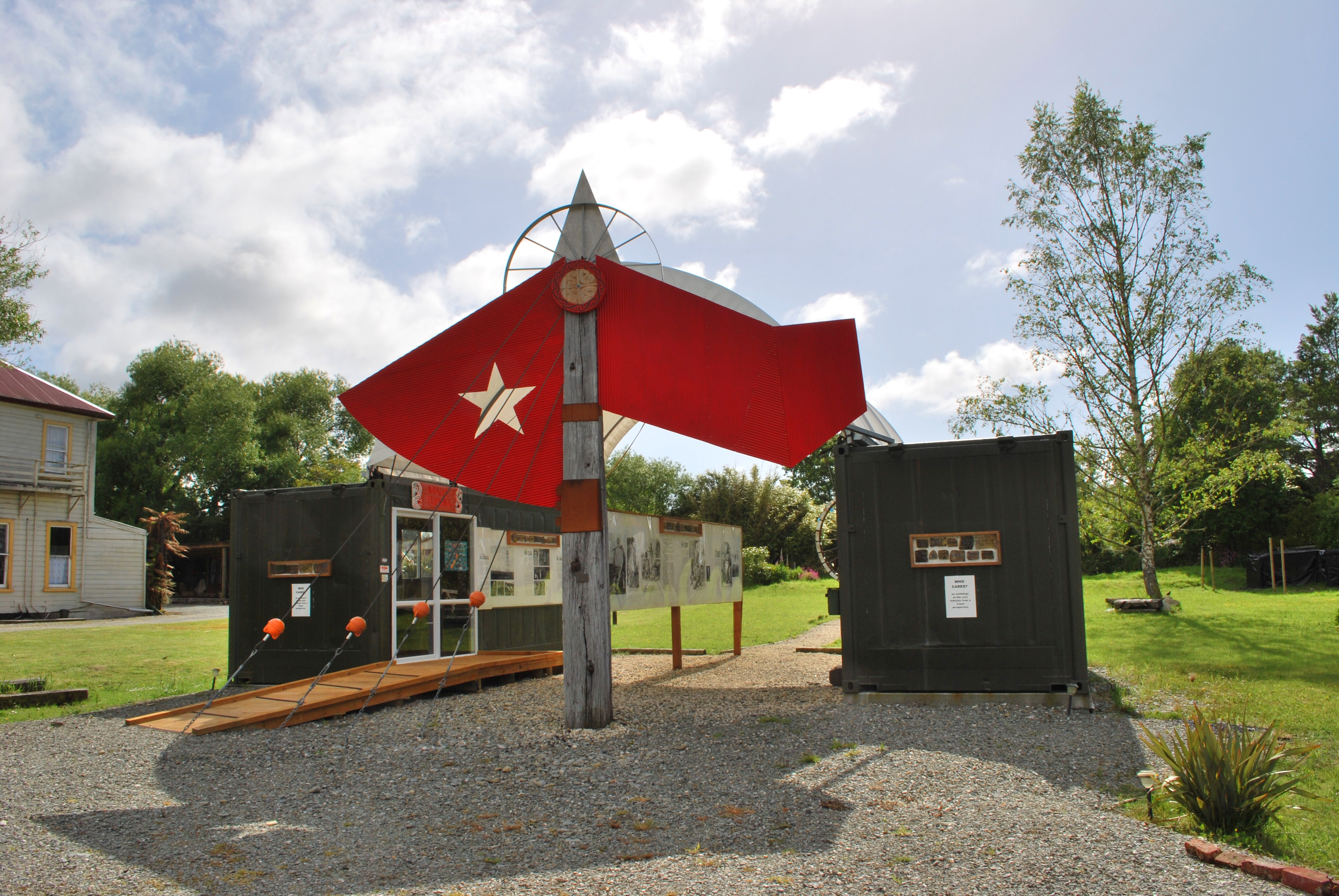
Blackball Miners Strike Memorial

In February 2008, it was announced that, beginning on 21 March with a "series of events including book launches, a parade, a seminar and a theatre presentation", Blackball would mark the centenary of the strike. Event co-coordinator Jane Wells said the strike changed New Zealand's political history, concluding that "many of the work rights we take for granted now have their origins in the Blackball strike and the later work of its leaders and we think this needs to be celebrated and remembered". Graeme Colgan an employment law specialist and Chief Judge of the Employment Court of New Zealand at the time, presented an analysis of the court proceedings that happened "during and after the strike....[concluding]...a notable feature of the litigation was that while the union took unsuccessful action against the company, all proceedings against the union were taken by the state through the Labour Department".

== See also ==
- Mining in New Zealand
- Vinbräcka strike
