= Electoral history of Alfred Hindmarsh =

List of elections featuring Alfred Hindmarsh as a candidate

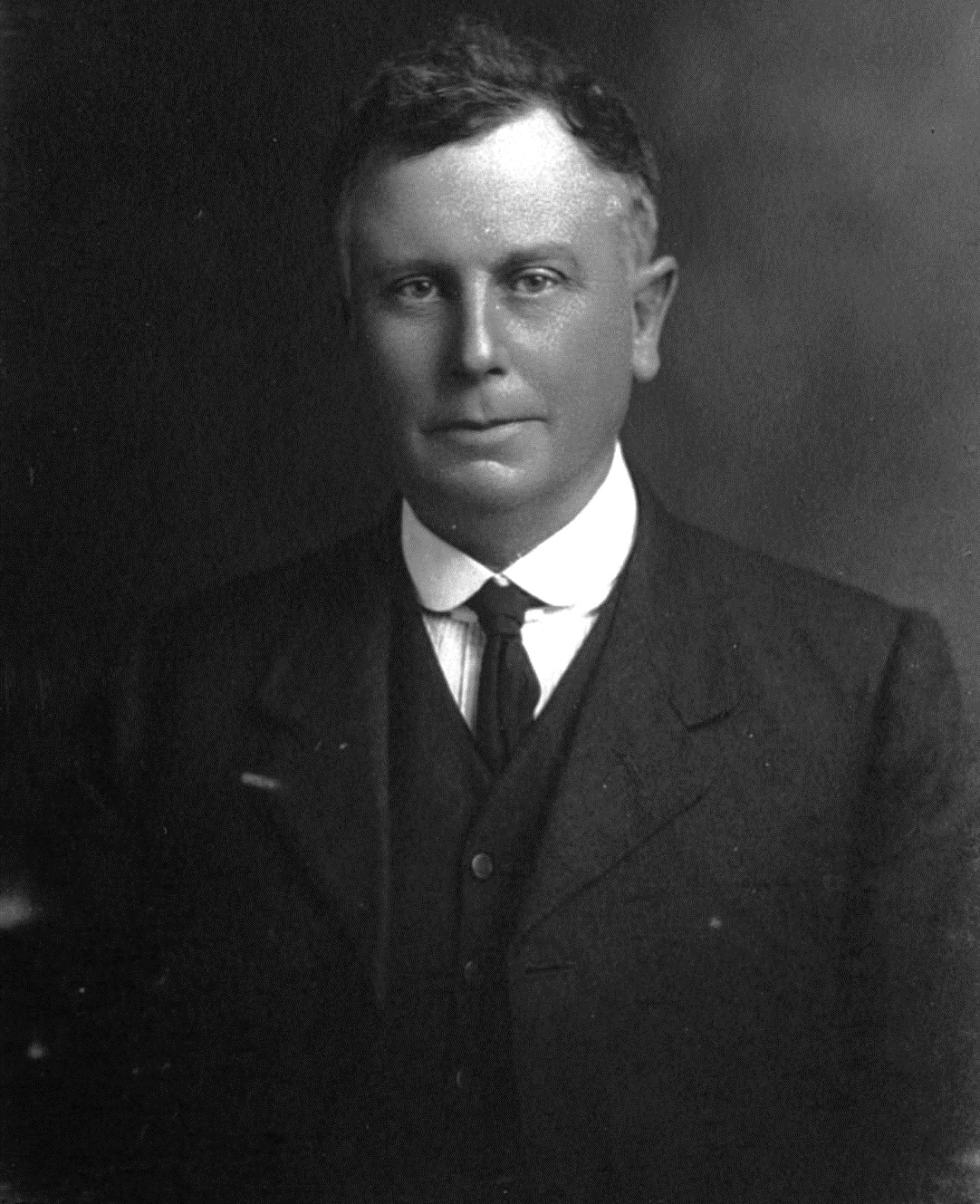
Alfred Hindmarsh, c.1915.

This is a summary of the electoral history of Alfred Hindmarsh, Leader of the Labour Party (1916–18) and Member of Parliament for Wellington South (1911–18).

== Parliamentary elections ==
=== 1905 election ===
1905 general election: Newtown
Party	Candidate	Votes	%	±%
Liberal	William Barber	3,231	42.87	+15.27
Conservative	Thomas William Hislop	2,018	26.78	−0.26
Independent Liberal	William Chapple	1,795	23.82	+3.56
Ind. Labour League	Alfred Hindmarsh	383	5.08	+5.08
Majority		1213	16.09	+15.54
Informal votes		108	1.43	
Turnout		7,535	84.13	
Registered electors		8,956		

=== 1911 election ===
1911 general election: Wellington South, First ballot
Party	Candidate	Votes	%	±%
Reform	Robert Wright	2,974	41.37	
Labour	Alfred Hindmarsh	2,670	37.14	
Liberal	William Barber	1,264	17.58	
Independent	Albert Couzens	185	2.57	
Informal votes		95	1.32	
Turnout		7,188	79.27	
Registered electors		9,067		

1911 general election: Wellington South, Second ballot
Party	Candidate	Votes	%	±%
Labour	Alfred Hindmarsh	3,598	51.76	+14.62
Reform	Robert Wright	3,344	48.10	+6.73
Majority		254	3.65	
Informal votes		9	0.12	−1.18
Turnout		6,951	76.66	−2.61

=== 1914 election ===
1914 general election: Wellington South
Party	Candidate	Votes	%	±%
United Labour	Alfred Hindmarsh	4,279	56.12	+4.36
Reform	John Luke	3,064	40.18	
Independent	Robert Bradford Williams	221	2.89	
Majority		1,215	15.93	
Informal votes		60	0.78	
Turnout		7,624	86.29	
Registered electors		8,835		

== Local elections ==
=== 1911 local elections ===
Wellington Harbour Board, Wellington
Party	Candidate	Votes	%	±%
Citizens League	Robert Fletcher	12,478	96.28	
Citizens League	John Fitzgerald	8,219	63.41	
Labour	Alfred Hindmarsh	7,455	57.52	
Citizens League	James Trevor	6,500	50.15	
Citizens League	William Hildreth	5,819	44.89	
Labour	Tom Young	5,716	44.10	
Independent	Paul Coffey	3,842	29.64	
Independent	George Farland	1,809	13.95	
Turnout		12,960		

=== 1913 local elections ===
Wellington Harbour Board, Wellington
Party	Candidate	Votes	%	±%
Independent	Robert Fletcher	12,230	74.81	21.47
Civic League	Robert Wright	9,261	56.65	
Civic League	James Trevor	7,855	48.05	−2.10
United Labour	Alfred Hindmarsh	7,507	45.92	−11.60
Civic League	A. Leigh Hunt	7,458	45.62	
Independent	John Edward Fitzgerald	7,023	42.96	
United Labour	Michael Reardon	4,310	26.36	
United Labour	Elijah Carey	4,018	24.58	
Independent	Michael Francis Bourke	3,604	22.04	
Independent	George Farland	2,152	13.16	−0.79
Total votes		16,346		

=== 1915 local elections ===
Wellington Harbour Board, Wellington
Party	Candidate	Votes	%	±%
Independent	Robert Fletcher	9,861	61.59	−13.22
Civic League	William Cable	9,030	56.40	
United Labour	Alfred Hindmarsh	8,977	56.07	+10.15
Civic League	Robert Wright	8,607	53.76	−2.89
Civic League	A. Leigh Hunt	5,835	36.44	−9.18
Independent	John Edward Fitzgerald	5,747	35.89	−7.07
Civic League	Herbert G. Hill	4,701	29.36	
Independent	William Hildreth	4,504	28.13	
United Labour	George Bruce	3,529	22.04	
United Labour	Tom Young	3,243	20.25	
Total votes		16,009		

=== 1917 local elections ===
Wellington Harbour Board, Wellington
Party	Candidate	Votes	%	±%
Citizens League	William Cable	7,658	79.13	+22.73
Citizens League	Robert Wright	6,922	71.53	+17.77
Labour	Alfred Hindmarsh	6,914	71.44	+15.37
Independent	Robert Fletcher	6,579	67.98	+6.39
Citizens League	Charles Norwood	5,359	55.37	
Independent	William Hildreth	5,277	54.53	+26.40
Total votes		9,677		
