= Elijah Carey =

New Zealand politician (1876–1916)

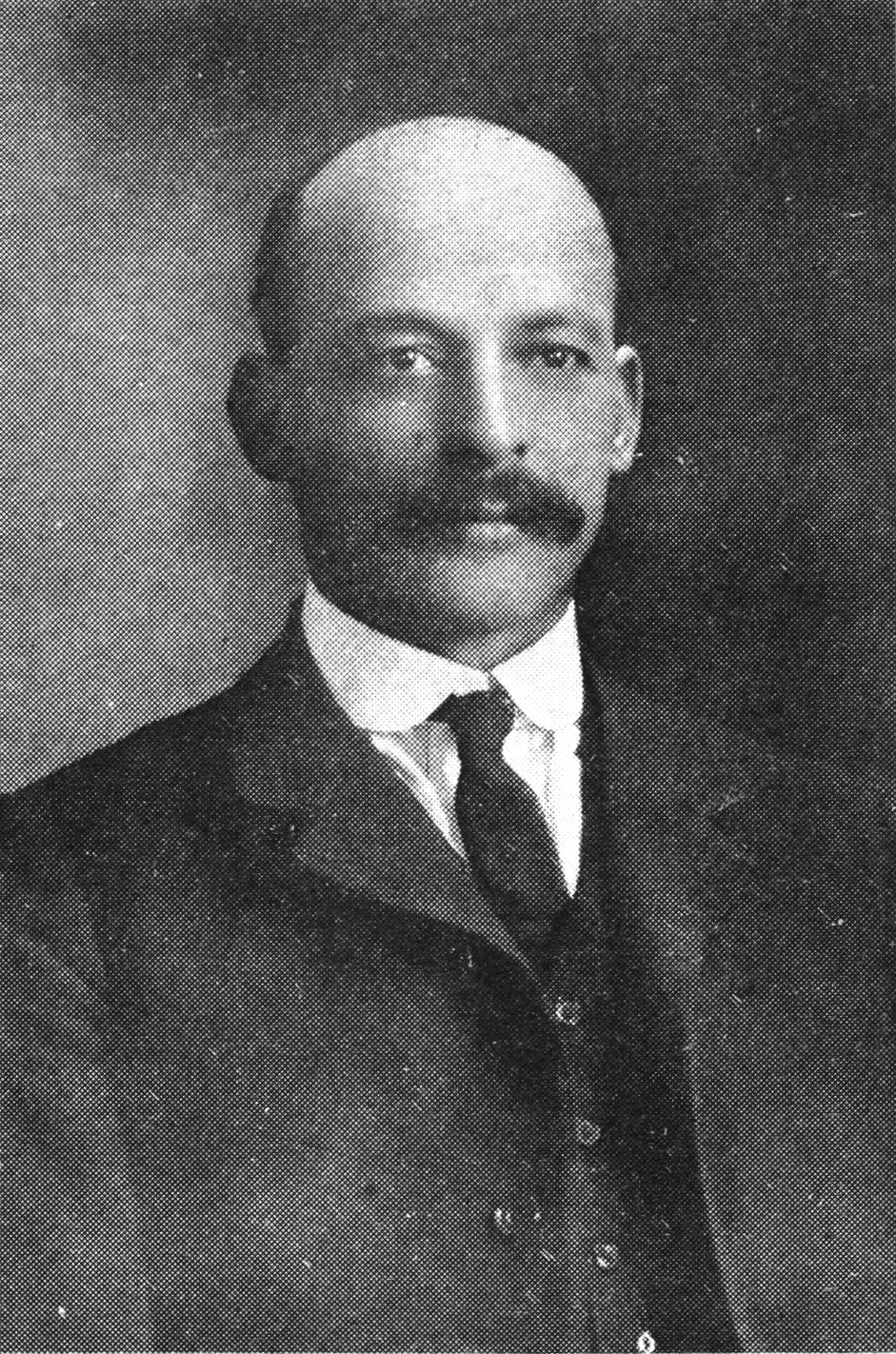

Personal details
- Born: Elijah John Carey; 20 August 1876 Gympie, Queensland, Australia
- Died: 14 October 1916 (aged 40) Somme, France
- Party: United Labour (1912-16); Labour (1910-12); IPLL (1905-10)
- Spouse: Ellen Goss

Military service
- Allegiance: New Zealand Army
- Years of service: 1915-16
- Rank: Private
- Battles/wars: First World War; Battle of the Somme (DOW)

Elijah John Carey (20 August 1876 – 14 October 1916) was a New Zealand waiter, trade unionist and soldier.

== Biography ==
=== Early life ===
He was born in Gympie, Queensland, Australia on 20 August 1876. After originally working as a miner, he became an apprentice printer, picking up press skills he would use later in life, before leaving to travel abroad. Carey travelled through Europe, the United States and South America where he worked as a steward on steamships and as a waiter in several hotels.

In the early 1890s he returned to Australia and became involved in the Labour movement. Moving to Western Australia, once again he had little success in mining, but became involved in trade unionism there, serving on the Coolgardie Trades Council. By 1902 Carey was living in Sydney working as a waiter where he was active in Australian Labour politics and he is said to have even been a personal friend of both Andrew Fisher and Billy Hughes.

Around 1904 Carey moved to New Zealand, settling in Wellington, and found work as a waiter. There he married Ellen Goss on 9 January 1905. He attempted to unionise the catering industry there. Despite earlier failures he eventually helped create the Wellington Amalgamated Society of Cooks and Waiters. He became the union's vice president in 1906 and was soon the chief organiser first full-time secretary in January 1907. By the years end he was blacklisted by employers.

=== Political activities ===
With the influence of the cooks and waiters' union expanding, as did Carey's in the labour movement. In 1909 he became vice president of the Wellington Trades and Labour Council and eventually its president from March 1910 to March 1911.

Carey was a moderate in the labour movement favouring the creation of a broad, centre-left party along the lines of the Australian Labor Party, stating workers should 'strike with pencil and paper through the ballot-box'. Naturally, Carey associated with the other more moderate unionists of his day such as Tom Paul, David McLaren, Alfred Hindmarsh and Jack McCullough, whom all opposed more radical socialism such as New Zealand Federation of Labour (the 'Red Feds') and the New Zealand Socialist Party. Like the other moderates, he had little sympathy for the Waihi miners' strike cause.

In 1912 Carey played a leading role in establishing the new United Labour Party of New Zealand (ULP) out of the remnants of the first Labour Party, sitting on the party's executive. At the Labour Unity Congress in July 1913, Carey defended the ULP ideal of any new Labour party being a single political and industrial organisation, and limiting strikes. When both motions were lost heavily, he sided with the ULP rump and left, repudiating the new and more radical Social Democratic Party.

Carey was a candidate in several Wellington municipal elections in 1909, 1910, 1911 and 1913. In addition he unsuccessfully stood in Wellington North at the 1911 general election for the Labour Party.

=== Military service ===
Like many of the other Labour moderates, Carey supported New Zealand joining World War I. In December 1915, at the age of 39, he volunteered for active service in the army, entering the 2nd Battalion, Wellington Infantry Regiment as a Private. Aboard his troopship he edited a soldiers' newsletter. In September 1916 joined his regiment in France. On 14 October 1916 Carey died from wounds received in action during the Battle of the Somme. Survived by both Ellen and his adopted daughter, he was buried in the Etaples Military Cemetery.

Carey Street in Mitchelltown, Wellington, was named after him.
