= Labour Unity Conferences =

Labour conferences in New Zealand

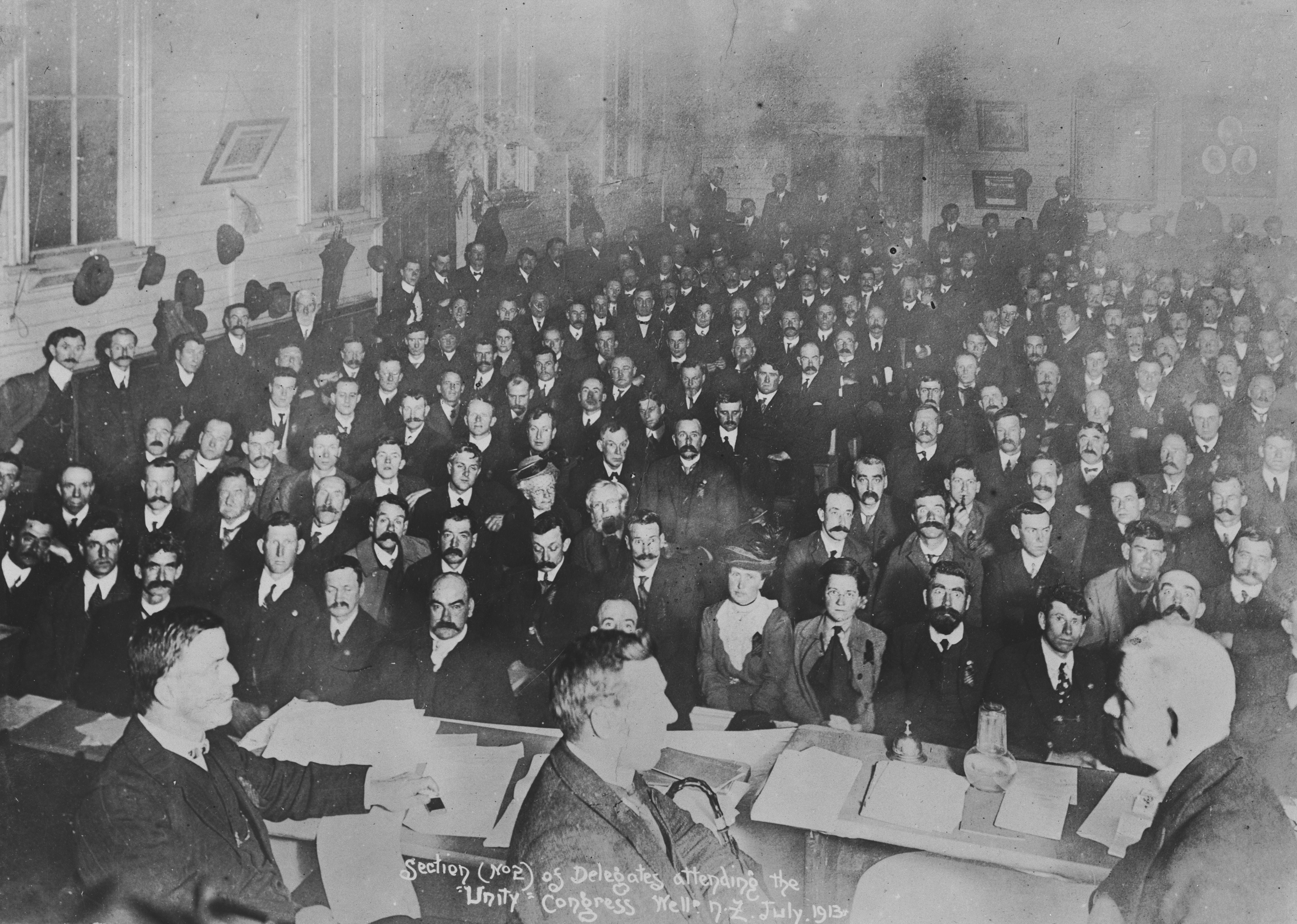
Delegates attending the 1913 Unity Congress

In April 1912 and July 1913, two "unity conferences" were held to discuss and determine the future of organised labour in New Zealand. The events mainly centred around the debate over whether industrial action or political activity should be the means of achieving the aims of workers and additionally to unite the "moderate" and "militant" factions within the labour movement. Whilst neither conference fully unified the labour movement, it laid a framework of co-operation that would later assist during the creation of the current New Zealand Labour Party in 1916.

== Background ==
From the lead up to the 1890 general election there was considerable co-operation between trade unions and the New Zealand Liberal Party. The ensuing Liberal government enacted legislation much lauded by labourers including a basic welfare system and a pension scheme. In particular, the Industrial Conciliation and Arbitration Act 1894 which encouraged more unions to form, and by 1905 they were plentiful and well-organized. However, the more radical unionists had been criticising the Liberal's declining enthusiasm for progressive workplace reform and began to question whether the Liberal Party were truly the patrons of workplace legislation that had been supposed.

This instigated increasing debate amongst unionists on the issue to separate themselves from the Liberals. The popular Richard Seddon had died and his successor, Sir Joseph Ward, was seen as aloof from labourers concerns. Questions of him came to a head when Ward announced his "rest from legislation", which eventually led to many former Liberal supporters leaving to join a new splinter party dedicated to the interests of labourers, the Independent Political Labour League (IPLL), formed in 1904. The breakdown of the alliance between organized labour and the Liberal Party was centred particularly around the right to strike, with Liberals still favouring the existing arbitration legislation. Unable to reconcile with the Liberal Party the organized labour set out to create its own separate political vehicle where the first hurdle was to unite the moderate and militant factions into a singular organisation.

== The 1912 conference ==
A Unity Conference was called in Wellington for April 6, 1912, to endeavour to secure the industrial and, political union of all the Labour organisations in New Zealand. It was the brainchild of American socialist Walter Thomas Mills, of Milwaukee who was accused by the far-left as a "stalking-horse for the bourgeoisie". As a result, the New Zealand Socialist Party and many other radicals boycotted the conference. Those groups in attendance were representatives of the Trades and Labour Councils, branches of the New Zealand Labour Party, Trades Unions, Fabian Society, Land Values League, Young New Zealand Party, Students' Christian Association, and some other bodies. Up to that time the conference was the largest and most representative gathering of progressive forces which had ever met in New Zealand. Tom Paul of Dunedin occupied the conference chair whilst Dan Sullivan from Christchurch was appointed secretary.

After a full week of discussion and deliberation an elaborate constitution and plan was agreed upon for a combined organisation of the political and industrial movement under the name of the United Labour Party (ULP). Jack McCullough argued successfully for the ULP to have a strong union element in the governing body of the party to prevent it being "captured by liberals and respectables" whilst remaining sufficiently inclusive. The new party adopted the symbol of clasped hands as its official badge as well as resolving to join the International Socialist Bureau as signs of unity.

Despite the fact that the ULP received support from a very influential circle in New Zealand and had a large following at its genesis, it was apparent after a few months that a form of organisation which combined political and industrial machinery in one body was not likely to receive anything like unanimous endorsement which it desired. The lack of radical participation still further highlighted an absence of unity in the labour movement in New Zealand.

== The 1913 conference ==
In July 1913, following a conference in January when a Unity Committee was set up, and an intensive campaign, a 'Basis of Unity' congress of delegates assembled in Wellington with a numerical record number of delegates in attendance. Mills, who was the principal organiser of the 1912 Unity Conference which formed the ULP and also of both the January and July gatherings in the following year, was again the architect of the event. In addition to an attendance of well over 300 delegates, members of the United Congress Committee (elected at the January Conference), Industrial Workers of the World and the executives of the New Zealand Federation of Labour, United Labour Party and the New Zealand Socialist Party were in attendance. Prominent Socialist leaders attended such as Harry Holland, Peter Fraser and Michael Joseph Savage (leaders of the Auckland branch), Frederick Cooke of Christchurch, and Paddy Webb from the West Coast. The Unity Congress was in session for ten days and it was more noteworthy for its psychological influence than for its direct accomplishment. The chairman of the meeting was John Rigg, whose contribution to the proceedings of the conference was labeled 'masterly' and of crucial importance.

This conference recommended that the political and industrial wings should be separated and central organisations established for each. At this meeting the militant leaders made a concerted effort to conciliate the moderates, and showed themselves prepared to compromise on many fundamental issues. By substantial majorities the Congress affirmed the necessity for two distinct organisations the United Federation of Labour, later known as the 'Red Feds', as the industrial and the Social Democratic Party (SDP) as the political expression, It failed to unify all the factions, but its value was seen still as high given the added emphasis to the importance of unity. During the determination of the constitution and policy of the two, the balance of advantage lay with the militants, and large groups of the moderate sections then withdrew from the conference. Over the issue that "strikes should be effective when used, and under central control", a difference of opinion arose over this leading many moderates, including such notables as Sir George Fowlds, David McLaren, Tom Paul and Bill Veitch, to leave and resolve to themselves continue on with the ULP.

The somewhat imperfect degree of the unity achieved, however, was soon jeopardised by the nationwide waterfront and miners strike of October 1913. To many moderates the conflict seemed a confirmation of their worst fears. The defeat of the strike by the Reform Government, after a bitter struggle, severely weakened the UFL (whose membership declined rapidly) and significantly handicapped the SDP, for the latter became indelibly associated in the public mind with revolutionary syndicalism. These events strengthened the reflections of the militants on the merits of political, as opposed to industrial, action. Thereafter a concerted effort was made to achieve the aims of organised labour through legislative means.

== Outcomes ==
Following the defeat of labour in the 1913 Great Strike the ULP and SDP co-operated during the 1914 election campaign with neither party standing opposing candidates and supporting a jointly endorsed candidate in every contested electorate. The ULP and SDP MPs and labour-aligned independents soon worked together in Parliament, with Alfred Hindmarsh of the ULP selected as the unified caucus' chairman. In August 1915, when Prime Minister William Massey formed his Liberal-Reform wartime coalition government, he extended the invitation to Labour caucus. Hindmarsh declined the offer and, as a result, the Labour MPs became the effectual opposition in Parliament. This scenario continued until July 1916 when the ULP and SDP decided to formally merge to become the modern day Labour Party, with the mutual disapproval of conscription proving to be the belief that ultimately unified New Zealand's labour movement.
