= 1909 Wellington mayoral election =

New Zealand local election

- 29 April 1909
- Turnout: 13,411 (44.48%)
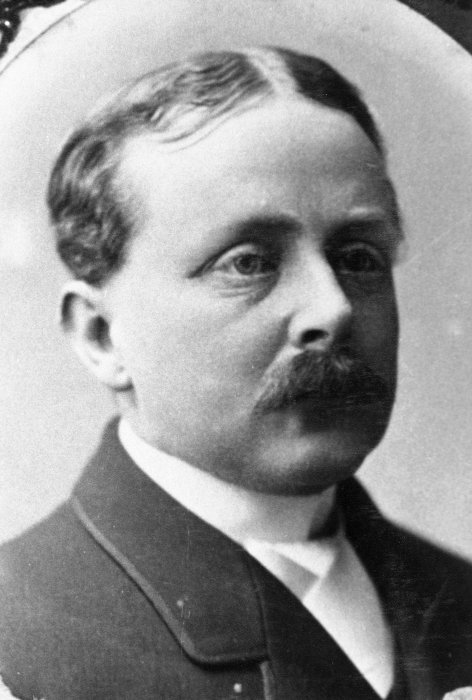

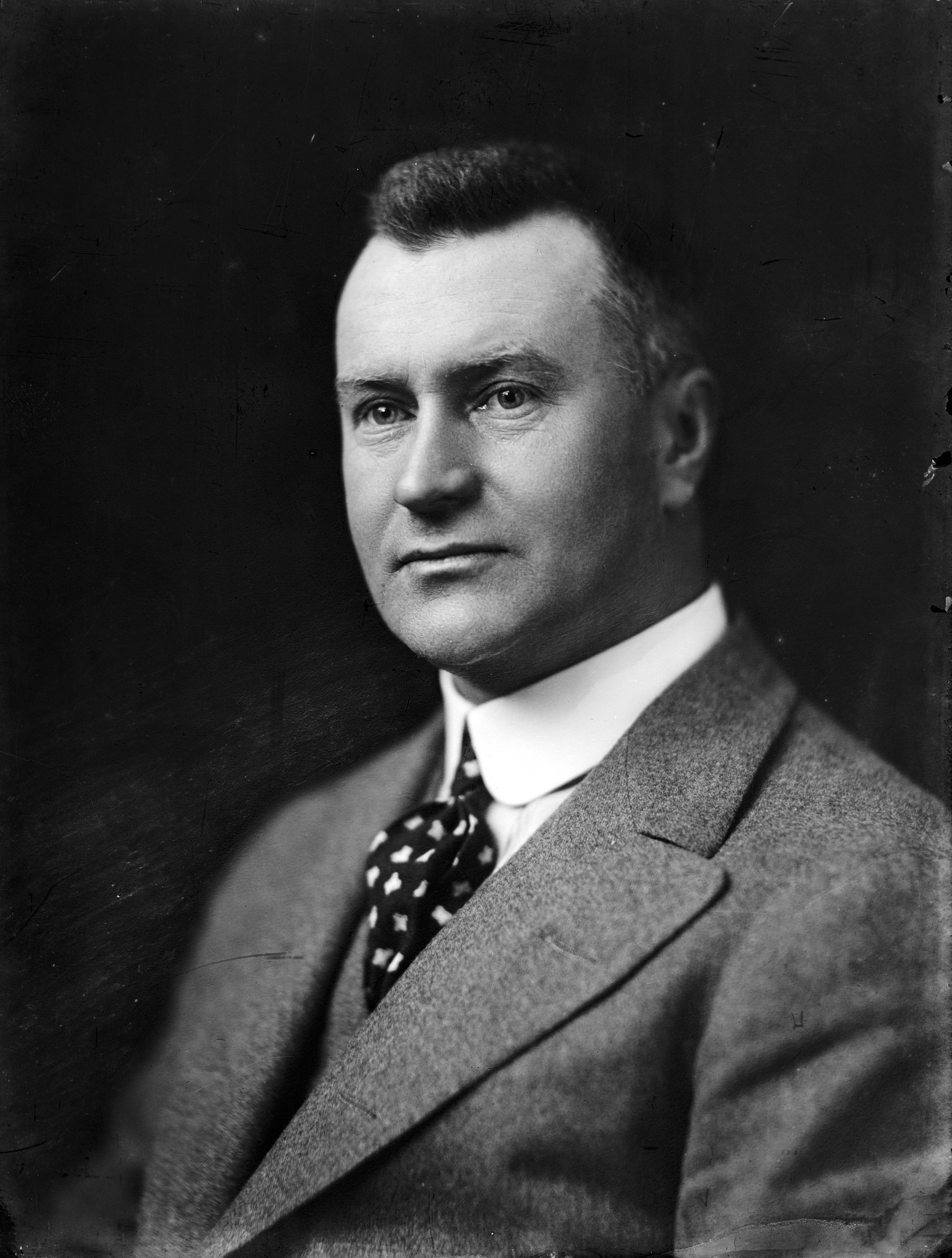

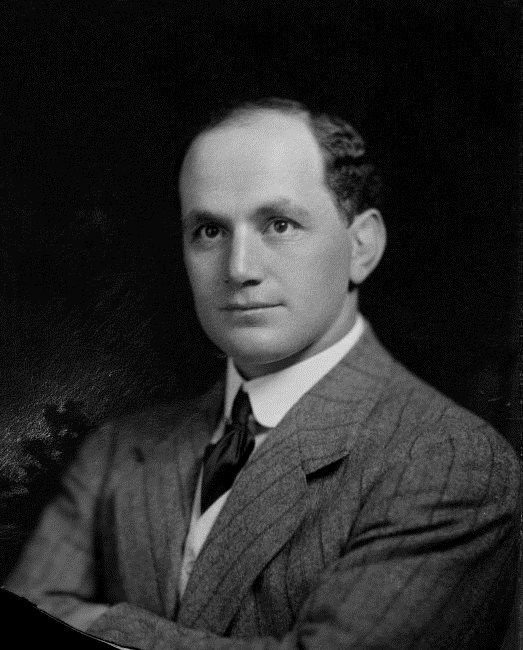

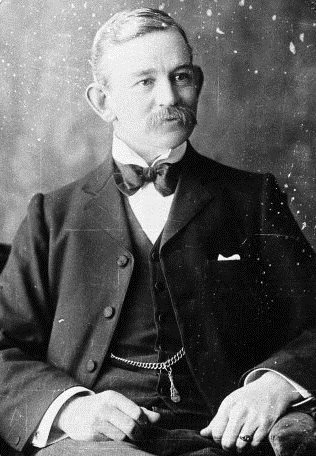
Candidate	Alfred Newman	Thomas Wilford
Party	Independent	Independent
Popular vote	4,523	4,240
Percentage	33.72	31.61
Candidate	Francis Fisher	John Rigg
Party	Independent	Ind. Labour League
Popular vote	3,208	824
Percentage	23.92	6.14
Mayor before election
Thomas William Hislop
Elected mayor
Alfred Newman

The 1909 Wellington mayoral election was part of the New Zealand local elections held that same year. In 1909, elections were held for the Mayor of Wellington plus other local government positions including fifteen city councillors. The polling was conducted using the standard first-past-the-post electoral method.

== Background ==
Thomas William Hislop, the incumbent Mayor, did not seek re-election. Alfred Newman was elected to office as the new Mayor of Wellington, beating four other contenders.

== Mayoralty results ==
1909 Wellington mayoral election
Party	Candidate	Votes	%	±%
Independent	Alfred Newman	4,523	33.72	
Independent	Thomas Wilford	4,240	31.61	−2.75
Independent	Francis Fisher	3,208	23.92	
Ind. Labour League	John Rigg	824	6.14	
Independent	Fred Bolton	616	4.59	
Majority		283	2.11	
Turnout		13,411	44.48	−7.16

== Councillor results ==
1909 Wellington City Council election
Party	Candidate	Votes	%	±%
Citizens League	John Luke	8,074	84.63	+10.16
Citizens League	Robert Fletcher	7,256	76.05	+19.01
Citizens League	Thomas Ballinger	7,218	75.60	+9.11
Ind. Labour League	David McLaren	6,770	70.96	+7.50
Citizens League	Arthur Atkinson	6,533	68.48	
Citizens League	Falk Cohen	6,446	67.56	+9.99
Citizens League	George Shirtcliffe	6,420	67.29	+17.15
Citizens League	Walter Morrah	6,330	66.35	+11.35
Citizens League	John Smith Jr.	6,320	66.24	+9.54
Citizens League	Thomas Carmichael	6,062	63.54	+6.16
Citizens League	James Devine	5,796	60.75	
Ind. Labour League	Alfred Hindmarsh	5,337	55.94	−0.79
Citizens League	James Trevor	5,157	54.05	+11.78
Independent	John Fitzgerald	5,154	54.02	
Independent	George Frost	4,521	47.38	+2.34
Citizens League	James Dykes	3,969	41.60	
Citizens League	Herbert Seaton	3,913	41.01	
Citizens League	Arthur Hume	3,897	40.84	
Independent	Len McKenzie	3,894	40.81	
Independent	William Bennett	3,876	40.62	
Independent	Arthur Fullford	3,196	33.50	+9.53
Independent	Albert Casey	3,097	32.46	
Ind. Labour League	Charles Chapman	2,860	29.97	
Independent	Wilfred Higginbottom	2,595	27.20	
Ind. Labour League	Albert Cooper	2,448	25.66	−7.08
Ind. Labour League	William Hampton	2,439	25.56	−5.97
Independent	John Aston	2,422	25.38	
Ind. Labour League	Michael Reardon	2,160	22.64	−7.95
Independent	Robert McKenzie	2,140	22.43	
Ind. Labour League	Elijah Carey	2,102	22.03	
Ind. Labour League	William Noot	1,924	20.16	
Independent	Charles Monaghan	1,482	15.53	
Independent	Vilhelm Jensen	1,298	13.60	
