= List of by-elections to the Wellington City Council =

By-elections to the Wellington City Council occur to fill vacant seats in the City Council. The death, resignation, bankruptcy or expulsion of a sitting councillor can cause a by-election to occur. By-elections were particularly frequent in the 1980s and 1990s but have become a rarity in recent years with only three occurring since 2000.

== Background ==
Local by-elections normally have lower turnouts than full local body elections. A noted case occurred in 1960 when a vacancy triggered a by-election which had a turnout of only 7.7% of voters, prompting Mayor Frank Kitts to label the light turnout a "deplorable state of affairs" as "...there were responsible and worthwhile citizens who were prepared to devote their time and money in service to the people". By-elections on the city council were on occasion deferred if a substantial majority of the council agreed to fill the vacancy by appointment, resulting in the highest polling unsuccessful candidate at the previous election being appointed to the council unless there is a public demand for a poll to be held (known as extraordinary vacancies). This arrangement has happened several times such as in 1973 when Olive Smuts-Kennedy resigned her seat and Seton Nossiter was appointed to replace her, in 1979 when Irvine Yardley resigned and was replaced with Tala Cleverley after several higher polling candidates declined the appointment, and in 1985 when Leone Harkness resigned and her council seat which was taken by Bruce Harris.

Two mayors first entered the Council via by-elections; John Luke (in 1905) and Celia Wade-Brown (in 1994).

== Summary ==
Between 1901 and 1986 municipal elections in Wellington were conducted at-large. Since 1986 municipal elections in Wellington have been held via a Wards system of local electoral districts. The following is a summary of by-elections held to fill vacancies on the Wellington City Council:

Key

Independent	Labour	Citizens'	Green

Ward	Date	Incumbent	Cause	Winner
At-large	15 August 1904	David Nathan	Resignation	Folk Cohen
At-large	31 August 1905	George Wiltshire	Death	John Luke
At-large	27 April 1906	Arthur Gibbs	Resignation	John Smith
At-large	8 September 1910	James Devine	Death	William Barber
At-large	8 September 1910	Thomas Ballinger	Resignation	William Thompson
At-large	17 May 1912	David McLaren	Elected as Mayor	Edward Tregear
At-large	17 September 1920	George Frost	Death	William Gaudin
At-large	18 July 1922	Sydney Underwood	Death	Alexander Parton
At-large	22 July 1926	Alec Monteith	Resignation	John Glover
At-large	30 November 1927	John Caughley	Resignation	Charlton Morpeth
At-large	29 June 1933	Frank Meadowcroft	Death	Peter Fraser
At-large	9 May 1936	Peter Fraser	Resignation	Andrew Parlane
At-large	4 November 1936	William Bennett	Death	John Read
At-large	2 November 1949	Frederick Furkert	Death	Berkeley Dallard
At-large	3 February 1955	Stewart Hardy	Resignation	Allan Highet
At-large	10 September 1960	Mervyn Castle	Death	Bob Archibald
At-large	15 November 1969	William Scollay	Resignation	Les Chapman
At-large	15 November 1969	John Turk	Resignation	Hollis Reed
Otari	9 May 1987	Rosemary Young-Rouse	Resignation	Les Stephens
Karori	11 July 1987	Gavin Wilson	Resignation	Arthur Kinsella
Southern	11 March 1989	Neville Taylor	Resignation	Rod Murphy
Southern	27 April 1991	John Blincoe	Resignation	Margaret Bonner
Onslow	30 April 1994	David Bull	Resignation	Judy Siers
Southern	30 April 1994	Merrin Downing	Resignation	Celia Wade-Brown
Southern	2 November 1996	John Gilberthorpe	Resignation	Bryan Pepperell
Northern	22 March 1997	Sally Baber	Resignation	Jack Ruben
Eastern	29 April 2000	Sue Kedgley	Resignation	Ray Ahipene-Mercer
Southern	22 December 2017	Paul Eagle	Resignation	Fleur Fitzsimons
Pukehīnau/Lambton	17 February 2024	Tamatha Paul	Resignation	Geordie Rogers
Takapū/Northern	1 October 2026	Tony Randle	Death	Greg O'Connor

== List of by-elections ==
=== 1904 by-election ===
1904 Wellington City Council by-election
Party	Candidate	Votes	%	±%
Independent	Folk Cohen	877	41.64	
Ind. Labour League	William Hampton	413	19.61	−12.62
Independent	George Baylis	357	16.95	−16.10
Independent	Robert Henry Davenport	230	10.92	−43.29
Independent	Francis Loudon	229	10.87	
Majority		464	22.03	
Turnout		2,106	17.20	

=== 1905 by-election ===
1905 Wellington City Council by-election
Party	Candidate	Votes	%	±%
Independent	John Luke	1,706	41.91	
Ind. Labour League	William Noot	745	18.30	
Independent	George Baylis	723	17.76	−18.19
Independent	Arthur Fullford	487	11.96	−20.60
Independent	Nicholas McGuiness	277	6.80	
Independent	Harry Biggs	132	3.24	
Majority		961	23.61	
Turnout		4,070	19.75	

=== 1906 by-election ===
1906 Wellington City Council by-election
Party	Candidate	Votes	%	±%
Independent	John Smith	759	28.18	
Independent	Richard Keene	586	21.76	−7.63
Independent	Martin Luckie	330	12.25	−18.22
Ind. Labour League	John Ball	266	9.87	
Independent	Thomas Wardell	216	8.02	
Independent	William J. Branigan	197	7.31	−15.20
Independent	Alex Rand	140	5.19	−26.14
Independent	Henry Fielder	126	4.67	
Independent	William James Gray	82	3.04	
Majority		173	6.42	
Turnout		2,693	13.30	

=== 1910 by-election ===
1910 Wellington City Council by-election
Party	Candidate	Votes	%	±%
Citizens League	William Henry Peter Barber	2,318	43.84	
Citizens League	William Thompson	1,468	27.76	
Independent	James Moran	1,221	23.09	
Labour	Michael Reardon	1,198	22.65	+0.01
Independent	James Godber	1,184	22.39	
Labour	Elijah Carey	1,112	21.03	−1.00
Independent	Henry Hampton Rayward	704	13.31	
Independent	Sydney George Nathan	516	9.75	
Independent	James Speed	508	9.60	
Independent	Ernest Coleridge	458	8.66	
Independent	Vilhelm Jensen	457	8.64	−4.96
Independent	Arthur Harry Fulford	297	5.61	
Independent	Andrew Hornblow	213	4.02	
Majority		247	4.67	
Turnout		5,287	16.46	

=== 1912 by-election ===
1912 Wellington City Council by-election
Party	Candidate	Votes	%	±%
United Labour	Edward Tregear	4,487	53.16	
Citizens League	William Thompson	3,694	43.76	+8.86
Independent	Arthur Fulford	259	3.06	
Majority		793	9.39	
Turnout		8,440	27.13	

=== 1920 by-election ===
1920 Wellington City Council by-election
Party	Candidate	Votes	%	±%
Citizens League	William Gaudin	5,159	63.87	+24.91
Labour	Tom Brindle	2,917	36.13	−3.62
Majority		2,239	27.73	
Turnout		8,073	24.13	

=== 1922 by-election ===
1922 Wellington City Council by-election,
Party	Candidate	Votes	%	±%
Citizens League	Alexander Parton	5,743	56.82	+22.67
Labour	John Glover	4,147	41.03	+9.87
Independent	Patrick Cavanagh	217	2.14	−4.07
Majority		1,596	15.79	
Turnout		10,107	23.95	

=== 1926 by-election ===
1926 Wellington City Council by-election
Party	Candidate	Votes	%	±%
Labour	John Glover	2,114	53.03	+18.52
Civic League	William Gaudin	1,845	46.28	
Informal votes		27	0.67	
Majority		269	6.74	
Turnout		3,986	9.03	

=== 1927 by-election ===
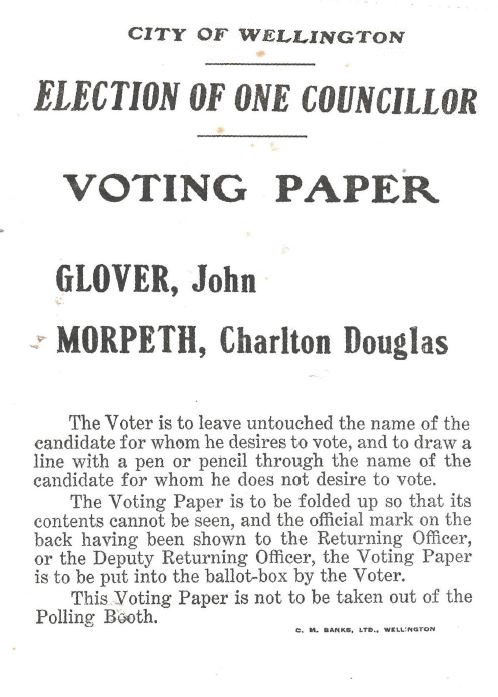
Ballot paper for the 1927 by-election

1927 Wellington City Council by-election
Party	Candidate	Votes	%	±%
Civic League	Charlton Morpeth	3,738	54.52	+22.44
Labour	John Glover	3,096	45.16	+5.74
Informal votes		21	0.30	
Majority		642	9.36	
Turnout		6,855	15.33	

=== 1933 by-election ===
1933 Wellington City Council by-election
Party	Candidate	Votes	%	±%
Labour	Peter Fraser	11,607	48.64	
Citizens'	Robert Wright	11,288	47.31	
Independent	John Castle	517	2.16	
Communist	Richard Webb	311	1.30	−13.81
Informal votes		136	0.57	
Majority		319	1.33	
Turnout		23,859	42.94	

=== May 1936 by-election ===
1936 Wellington City Council by-election
Party	Candidate	Votes	%	±%
Labour	Andrew Parlane	Unopposed		

=== November 1936 by-election ===
1936 Wellington City Council by-election
Party	Candidate	Votes	%	±%
Labour	John Read	10,032	49.29	+5.89
Citizens'	Thomas Forsyth	9,217	45.29	+1.35
Independent	Bruce Mabin	919	4.51	
Informal votes		182	0.89	
Majority		815	4.00	
Turnout		20,350	29.13	

=== 1949 by-election ===
1949 Wellington City Council by-election
Party	Candidate	Votes	%	±%
Citizens'	Berkeley Dallard	5,271	33.14	
Independent	Leslie Austin	3,375	21.21	
Independent	Stanley Dean	3,291	20.69	
Independent	William Bacon	2,961	18.61	
Independent	Thomas Callingham	848	5.33	
Informal votes		159	0.99	
Majority		1,896	11.92	
Turnout		15,905	15.0	

=== 1955 by-election ===
1955 Wellington City Council by-election
Party	Candidate	Votes	%	±%
Citizens'	Allan Highet	12,464	54.07	
Labour	Ernie Langford	10,488	45.50	+9.14
Informal votes		97	0.42	
Majority		1,976	8.57	
Turnout		23,049	27.0	

=== 1960 by-election ===
1960 Wellington City Council by-election
Party	Candidate	Votes	%	±%
Independent	Bob Archibald	2,588	37.68	+6.53
Citizens'	John Turk	2,028	29.52	−9.54
Labour	Charles Troughton	1,741	25.34	−1.70
Independent	Annette Griffin	297	4.32	−7.26
Communist	Paul Potiki	203	2.95	
Informal votes		11	0.16	
Majority		560	8.15	
Turnout		6,868	7.70	

=== 1969 by-election ===
1969 Wellington City Council by-election
Party	Candidate	Votes	%	±%
Citizens'	Les Chapman	6,325	47.13	+8.59
Citizens'	Hollis Reed	5,876	43.78	+11.01
Labour	Peter Butler	5,154	38.40	+0.12
Labour	Edward Hill	4,881	36.37	−2.22
Independent	Saul Goldsmith	2,301	17.14	+0.86
Civic Reform	Don McMillain	1,280	9.53	−0.78
Independent	Harry Hughes	1,021	7.60	−6.19
Majority		722	5.38	
Turnout		13,419	19.80	

=== 1987 by-election, Otari Ward ===
1987 Otari Ward by-election
Party	Candidate	Votes	%	±%
Citizens'	Les Stephens	4,388	49.31	
Labour	Valerie Taylor	3,326	37.38	
Independent	Bob Monks	884	9.93	
Independent	Darryl Ward	299	3.36	
Majority		1,062	11.93	
Turnout		8,897	51.23	

=== 1987 by-election, Karori Ward ===
1987 Karori Ward by-election
Party	Candidate	Votes	%	±%
Citizens'	Arthur Kinsella	2,750	56.41	
Labour	Tracey Crampton-Smith	2,125	43.59	−20.14
Majority		625	12.82	
Turnout		4,875	55.42	

=== 1989 by-election, Southern Ward ===
1989 Southern Ward by-election
Party	Candidate	Votes	%	±%
Labour	Rod Murphy	1,566	36.79	
Citizens'	Brian Barraclough	1,496	35.15	
Independent	Warwick Taylor	786	18.46	
Independent	Owen Henderson	408	9.58	
Majority		70	1.64	
Turnout		4,256	35.36	

=== 1991 by-election, Southern Ward ===
1991 Southern Ward by-election
Party	Candidate	Votes	%	±%
Labour	Margaret Bonner	2,492	27.92	
Independent	Helene Ritchie	1,564	17.52	
Citizens'	Ann Nolan	1,406	15.75	
Green	Liz Thomas	1,136	12.72	
NewLabour	Jeff Montgomery	903	10.11	
Independent	Silvio Bartholomeo Famularo	807	9.04	
Independent	Bill Maung	278	3.11	−10.11
People's Party	Christopher Ellis	116	1.29	−8.99
Independent	Harry Hughes	110	1.23	
Independent	Isiona Harmer	97	1.08	
Communist League	Patrick Brown	15	0.16	
Majority		928	10.39	
Turnout		8,924	43.02	

=== 1994 by-election, Onslow Ward ===
1994 Onslow Ward by-election
Party	Candidate	Votes	%	±%
Citizens'	Judy Siers	1,762	37.33	
Independent	Helene Ritchie	997	21.12	
Independent	Jill Main	925	19.60	
Alliance	Philip Lyth	502	10.63	
Independent	Bob Monks	328	6.95	−4.80
McGillicuddy Serious	Jonathan Wharton	93	1.97	
Independent	Alexander Schiff	88	1.86	−2.29
Informal votes		24	0.50	−3.73
Majority		765	16.21	
Turnout		4,719	45.42	

=== 1994 by-election, Southern Ward ===
1994 Southern Ward by-election
Party	Candidate	Votes	%	±%
Alliance Greens	Celia Wade-Brown	2,429	29.61	−6.90
Labour	Hola Taue	2,197	26.78	
Independent	Eddie Mollier	1,404	17.11	
Independent	Bryan Pepperell	886	10.80	
Independent	Alan Chambers	666	8.11	
Independent	John Ulrich	396	4.82	
McGillicuddy Serious	John Morrison	184	2.24	
Informal votes		40	0.48	−3.79
Majority		232	2.82	
Turnout		8,202	39.54	

=== 1996 by-election, Southern Ward ===
1996 Southern Ward by-election
Party	Candidate	Votes	%	±%
Independent	Bryan Pepperell	2,381	30.51	−7.24
Labour	Hola Taue	2,322	29.76	−17.91
Alliance	Roland Sapsford	1,347	17.26	−7.42
Independent	Alan Chambers	1,115	14.29	
Independent	Jonathan Mosen	441	5.65	
Asia Pacific	Mano'o Lutena Mulitalo	196	2.51	
Majority		59	0.75	
Turnout		7,802	36.89	

=== 1997 by-election, Northern Ward ===
1997 Northern Ward by-election
Party	Candidate	Votes	%	±%
Independent	Jack Ruben	3,737	33.23	
Citizens'	Ian Hutchings	2,949	26.22	
Independent	Helene Ritchie	2,820	25.08	
Alliance	John Fanning	1,453	12.92	−13.76
Natural Law	Penelope Donovan	284	2.52	
Informal votes		98	0.87	
Majority		788	7.00	
Turnout		11,243	41.73	

=== 2000 by-election, Eastern Ward ===
2000 Eastern Ward by-election
Party	Candidate	Votes	%	±%
Independent	Ray Ahipene-Mercer	3,034	33.12	
Independent	Richard Griffin	1,691	18.46	
Christian Democrats	Linda Dring	902	9.84	
Independent	Jo Morgan	847	9.24	−28.89
Independent	Gareth Rapson	843	9.20	
Independent	Jack Ruben	738	8.05	
Independent	Rama Ramanathan	601	6.56	−22.80
Legalise Cannabis	Michael Appleby	245	2.67	
Independent	Phil Sprey	145	1.58	−16.55
McGillicuddy Serious	Vince Terreni	86	0.93	
Informal votes		27	0.29	
Majority		1,343	14.66	
Turnout		9,159	38.50	

=== 2017 by-election, Southern Ward ===
2017 Southern Ward by-election
Party	Candidate	FPv%	Count						
Party	Candidate	FPv%	1	2	3	4	5	6	7
Labour	Fleur Fitzsimons	32.88%	2,155	2,165	2,174	2,224	2,293	2,454	2,805
Independent	Laurie Foon	26.29%	1,723	1,726	1,743	1,775	1,849	2,017	2,473
Independent	Vicki Greco	24.26%	1,590	1,595	1,603	1,682	1,707	1,765	
Independent	Mohamud Mohamed	6.61%	433	448	456	486	569		
Independent	Merio Marsters	4.13%	271	275	280	295			
Independent	Rob Goulden	3.65%	239	242	255				
Independent	Thomas Morgan	1.01%	66	73					
Independent	Don McDonald	0.93%	61						
Valid: 6538 Spoilt: 13 + 4 blank Quota: 1st iteration: 3,269; last iteration: 2,639

=== 2024 by-election, Pukehīnau / Lambton general ward ===
2024 Pukehīnau / Lambton general ward by-election
Party	Candidate	FPv%	Count					
Party	Candidate	FPv%	1	2	3	4	5	6
Green	Geordie Rogers	42.45	3,665	3,676	3,680	3,738	3,809	4,147
Independent	Karl Tiefenbacher	42.31	3,653	3,663	3,690	3,791	3,943	4,102
Independent	Ellen Blake	6.39	552	558	567	598	653	
Independent	Joan Shi	4.20	363	369	376	418		
Independent	Edward Griffiths	3.29	284	287	293			
Independent	Zan Rai Gyaw	0.71	62	66				
Independent	Peter Wakeman	0.61	53					
Valid: 8,632 (25.47%) Spoilt: 12 Quota: 4,125

=== 2026 by-election, Takapū/Northern general ward ===
Following the death of incumbent Takapū/Northern general ward councillor Tony Randle, a by-election was set to be held on 11 December 2026 to elect a new councillor for the ward to serve the remainder of Randle's 2025–2028 term. Nominations for candidates opened on 3 September 2026 and closed at midday on 1 October 2026. Greg O'Connor, retiring MP for Ōhāriu, confirmed that he would run in the by-election as an independent candidate, receiving support from Mayor Andrew Little. Former councillor John Apanowicz had also suggested he was considering running.

At the close of nominations on 1 October 2026, O'Connor was the only candidate. As such, he was elected unopposed.

2026 Takapū/Northern general ward by-election (uncontested)
Party	Candidate
Independent	Greg O'Connor
