= 1907 Wellington mayoral election =

New Zealand local election

- 25 April 1907
- Turnout: 8,620 (43.72%)
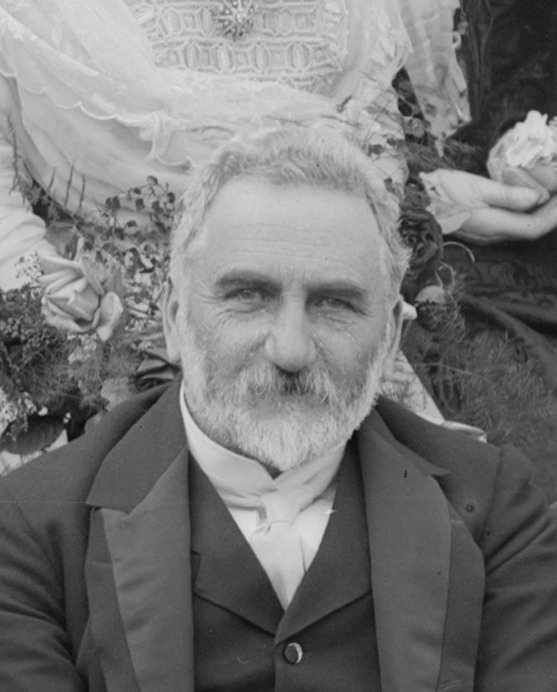

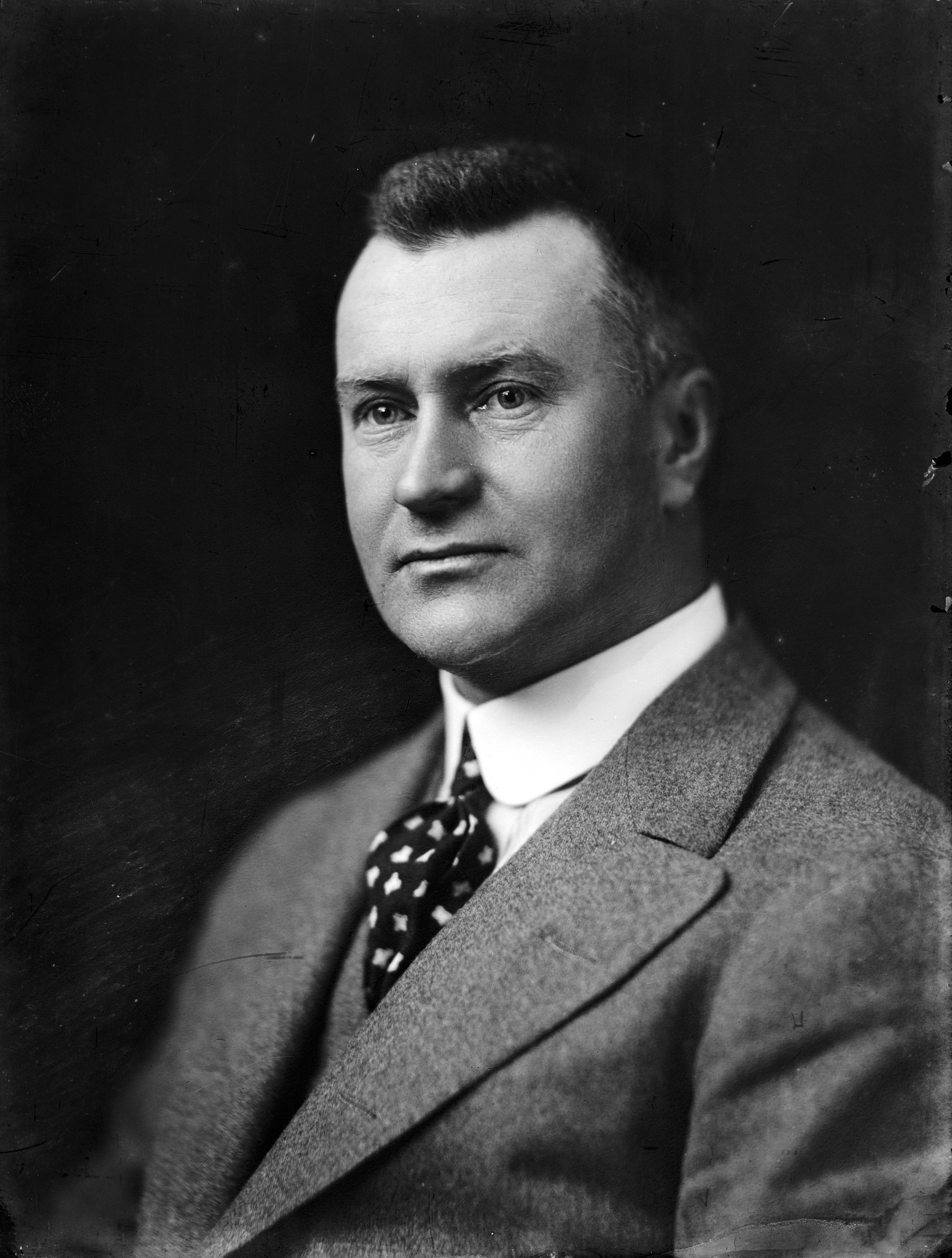
Candidate	Thomas William Hislop	Thomas Wilford
Party	Independent	Independent
Popular vote	5,658	2,962
Percentage	65.63	34.36
Mayor before election
Thomas William Hislop
Elected mayor
Thomas William Hislop

The 1907 Wellington mayoral election was part of the New Zealand local elections held that same year. In 1907, elections were held for the Mayor of Wellington plus other local government positions including fifteen city councillors. The polling was conducted using the standard first-past-the-post electoral method.

== Background ==
Thomas William Hislop, the incumbent Mayor, was re-elected to office as Mayor of Wellington, beating Thomas Wilford.

== Mayoralty results ==
1907 Wellington mayoral election
Party	Candidate	Votes	%	±%
Independent	Thomas William Hislop	5,658	65.63	+34.14
Independent	Thomas Wilford	2,962	34.36	
Majority		2,696	31.27	+23.97
Turnout		8,620	43.72	

== Councillor results ==
1907 Wellington City Council election
Party	Candidate	Votes	%	±%
Citizens League	John Luke	4,815	74.47	
Citizens League	Augustus Biss	4,721	73.02	+13.64
Independent	Francis Fisher	4,605	71.22	
Citizens League	Thomas Ballinger	4,299	66.49	−1.80
Ind. Labour League	David McLaren	4,103	63.46	+10.49
Citizens League	Folk Cohen	3,722	57.57	−5.34
Independent	Thomas Carmichael	3,710	57.38	+18.44
Independent	Robert Fletcher	3,688	57.04	
Ind. Labour League	Alfred Hindmarsh	3,668	56.73	+18.59
Citizens League	John Smith Jr.	3,666	56.70	
Citizens League	James Godber	3,579	55.35	−17.76
Citizens League	Walter Morrah	3,556	55.00	+5.73
Citizens League	Matthew Murdoch	3,417	52.85	−7.51
Independent	William Hales	3,367	52.08	
Citizens League	George Shirtcliffe	3,242	50.14	
Citizens League	Charlie Izard	2,985	46.17	−32.23
Citizens League	George Frost	2,912	45.04	+6.56
Citizens League	Alfred Lindsay	2,904	44.91	
Citizens League	James Trevor	2,733	42.27	+3.43
Ind. Labour League	Tom Young	2,336	36.13	+5.64
Ind. Labour League	John Brown	2,177	33.67	+4.56
Ind. Labour League	Albert Cooper	2,117	32.74	
Ind. Labour League	William Hampton	2,039	31.53	+4.36
Independent	Richard Keene	2,025	31.32	+1.93
Ind. Labour League	Michael Reardon	1,978	30.59	
Citizens League	William George	1,958	30.28	
Ind. Labour League	George Lightfoot	1,763	27.26	
Independent	George Baylis	1,665	25.75	−10.20
Independent	Arthur Fulford	1,550	23.97	
Independent	William Branigan	1,432	22.15	
Independent	James Bourke	1,288	19.92	
Independent	Robert Cook	1,248	19.30	
Independent	Albert Samuel	1,236	19.11	
Independent	Henry Inniss	860	13.30	
Independent	Frederick Larkin	847	13.10	
Independent	William Lingard	778	12.03	−10.79
