= 1915 Wellington mayoral election =

New Zealand local election

| ← 1914 | 8 May 1915 | 1917 → |
- Turnout: 18,644 (55.65%)
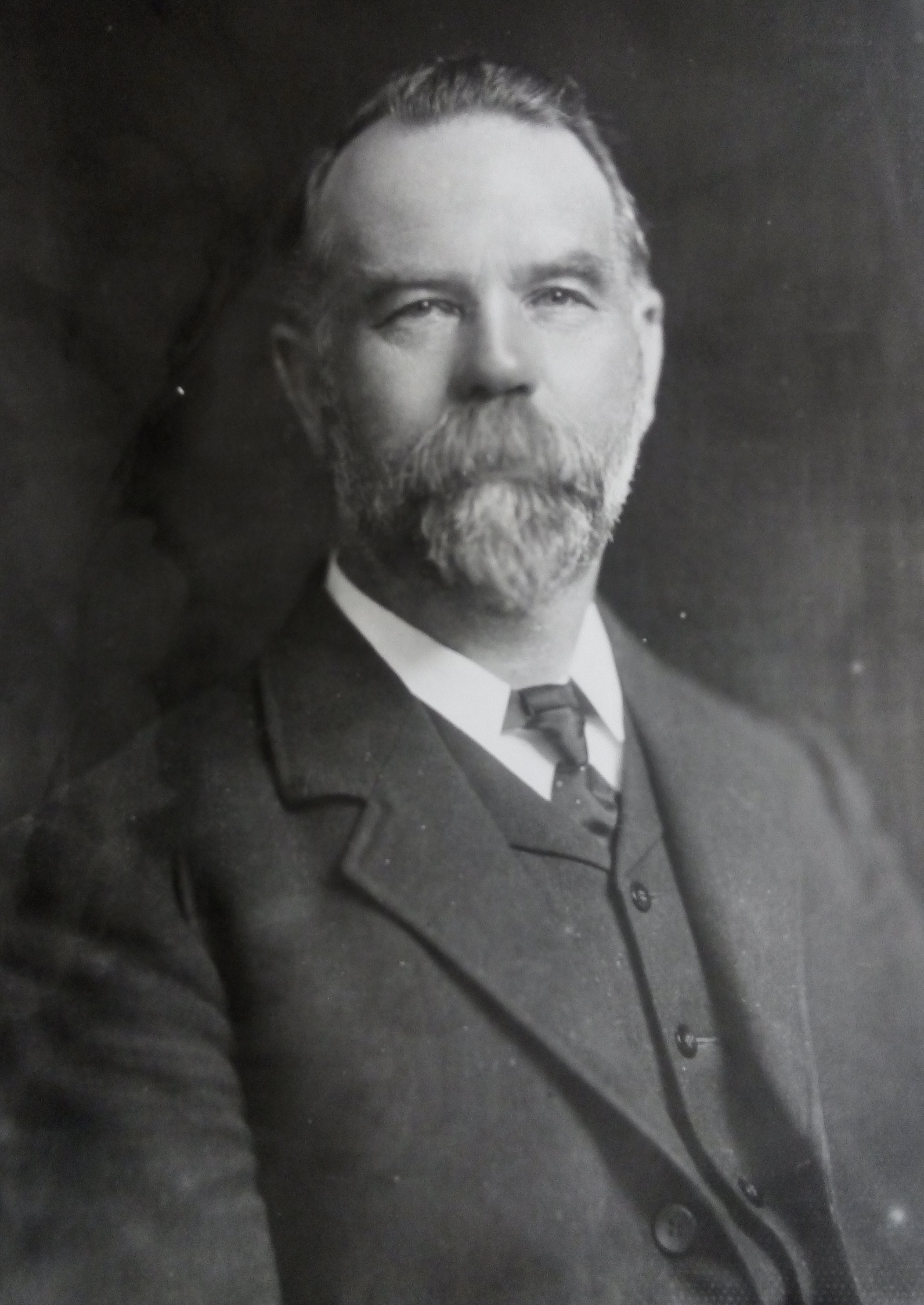

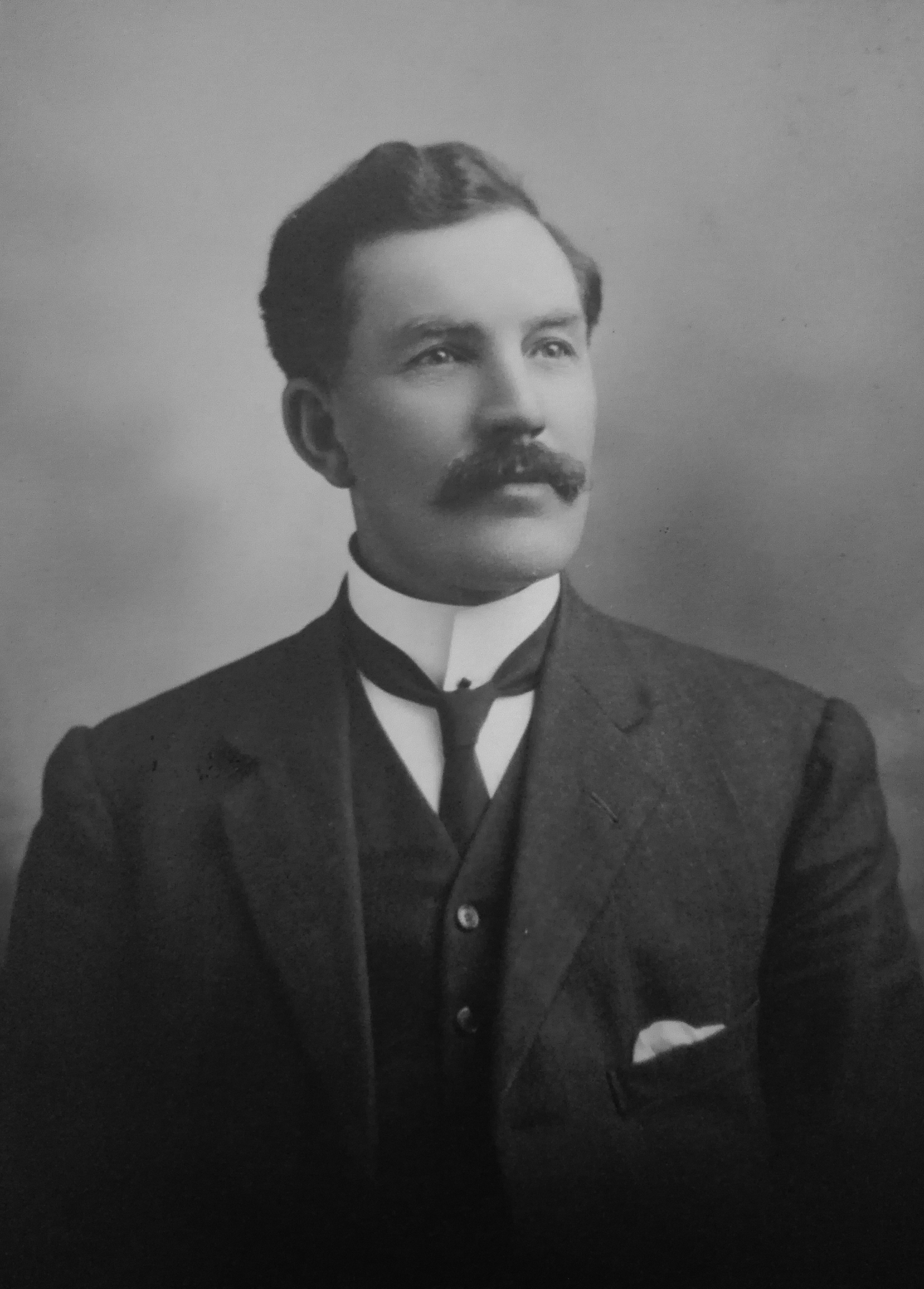

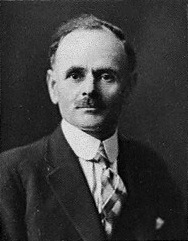
| Candidate | John Luke | Robert Fletcher | Charles Chapman |
| Party | Citizens League | Independent | Social Democrat |
| Popular vote | 9,987 | 7,525 | 1,132 |
| Percentage | 53.56 | 40.36 | 6.07 |
Mayor before election
John Luke
Elected mayor
John Luke

The 1915 Wellington mayoral election was part of the New Zealand local elections held that same year. In 1915, elections were held for the Mayor of Wellington plus other local government positions including fifteen city councillors. John Luke, the incumbent Mayor, retained office tallying just ten votes fewer than he did two years earlier. The standard first-past-the-post electoral method was used to conduct polling.

== Background ==
The election was held during World War I, which was the dominant news item of the day. The war was a topic in the election itself, with the current mayor John Luke being a strong supporter campaigning along a 'win the war' line. In stark contrast the Labour movement were opposed to the war, in particular conscription. In mid-1915 the war was still supported by the bulk of the population, thus the Labour mayoral candidate Charles Chapman performing much poorer than expected, when only three years earlier (before the war) Wellingtonians voted in the city's first Labour mayor. The Labour movement had restored some unity between the moderate and militant factions (helped by mutual opposition to conscription) and both factions agreed on a single candidate for the mayoralty, and a reduced but joint ticket for the council. However, the expected nadir in support in the face of jingoistic opponents came to fruition with none of the six Labour candidates elected to the council. This left Alfred Hindmarsh (who was elected to the Wellington Harbour Board) the sole elected Labour representative in Wellington.

== Mayoralty results ==
1915 Wellington mayoral election
| Party | Candidate | Votes | % | ±% |
|---|---|---|---|---|
| Citizens League | John Luke | 9,987 | 53.56 | +2.27 |
| Independent | Robert Fletcher | 7,525 | 40.36 | |
| Social Democrat | Charles Chapman | 1,132 | 6.07 | |
| Majority | | 2,462 | 13.20 | +21.02 |
| Turnout | | 18,644 | 55.65 | +5.46 |

== Councillor results ==
1915 Wellington City Council election
| Party | Candidate | Votes | % | ±% |
|---|---|---|---|---|
| Citizens League | John Fuller Jr. | 10,986 | 58.92 | +8.92 |
| Citizens League | George Frost | 10,656 | 57.15 | +9.68 |
| Citizens League | William Barber | 10,609 | 56.90 | +5.56 |
| Citizens League | Len McKenzie | 10,314 | 55.32 | +9.40 |
| Citizens League | Arthur Atkinson | 10,006 | 53.66 | +3.98 |
| Citizens League | Robert Wright | 9,860 | 52.88 | +5.19 |
| Independent | John Hutcheson | 9,115 | 48.88 | |
| Citizens League | James Godber | 9,008 | 48.31 | +4.99 |
| Citizens League | John Fitzgerald | 8,605 | 46.15 | +6.88 |
| Citizens League | Martin Luckie | 7,895 | 42.34 | +3.12 |
| Citizens League | William Bennett | 7,702 | 41.31 | |
| Citizens League | William Thompson | 7,491 | 40.17 | −0.42 |
| Citizens League | Alexander Veitch | 7,355 | 39.44 | |
| Independent | William Hildreth | 6,584 | 35.31 | |
| Citizens League | Thomas Bush | 6,379 | 34.21 | |
| Citizens League | John Swan | 6,160 | 33.04 | |
| Independent | Francis MacKenzie | 5,594 | 30.00 | |
| Social Democrat | Harry Holland | 5,484 | 29.41 | |
| Independent | John Jenkinson | 5,393 | 28.92 | |
| Citizens League | Charles Norwood | 5,320 | 28.53 | |
| Independent | Robert Hall | 5,268 | 28.25 | |
| United Labour | William Murdoch | 5,169 | 27.72 | |
| Social Democrat | John Glover | 4,741 | 25.42 | |
| United Labour | Tom Young | 4,644 | 24.90 | +2.71 |
| Independent | Daniel Moriarty | 4,495 | 24.10 | +7.45 |
| United Labour | Edward Kennedy | 4,233 | 22.70 | +3.34 |
| Independent | Andrew Hornblow | 3,243 | 17.39 | |
| Social Democrat | John Read | 3,186 | 17.08 | |
| Independent | William Edwards | 3,060 | 16.41 | |
