= List of speakers of the New Zealand Legislative Council =

The speaker of the Legislative Council was the chair of New Zealand's appointed upper house, the Legislative Council. The office corresponded roughly to that of speaker of the House of Representatives. The functions of the speaker included presiding over debates held in the chamber of the Council, and advising the legislative councillors on procedural rules. The position was abolished in 1951, along with the Legislative Council itself.

== Holders of the office ==
Eighteen people held the office of speaker since the creation of the Legislative Council. Two had previously been premier, and another went on to serve in that office; one had previously been speaker of the House of Representatives. A comprehensive list of speakers is below.

Key

Independent Liberal IPLL Reform United Labour National
†: died in office

No.	Name	Portrait	In office		Government
1	William Swainson		16 May 1854	8 August 1855	pre-responsible government
2	Frederick Whitaker^{1}		8 August 1855	12 May 1856	pre-responsible government
2	Frederick Whitaker^{1}		8 August 1855	12 May 1856	Sewell Ministry
3	Thomas Bartley		12 May 1856	1 July 1868	Sewell Ministry
3	Thomas Bartley		12 May 1856	1 July 1868	first Fox Ministry first Stafford Ministry second Fox Ministry; Domett Ministry; Whitaker–Fox Ministry; Weld Ministry
3	Thomas Bartley		12 May 1856	1 July 1868	second Stafford Ministry
4	John Richardson		1 July 1868	6 December 1878†	second Stafford Ministry
4	John Richardson		1 July 1868	6 December 1878†	third Fox Ministry third Stafford Ministry; Waterhouse Ministry fourth Fox Ministry first Vogel Ministry; Pollen Ministry second Vogel Ministry first Atkinson Ministry second Atkinson Ministry
4	John Richardson		1 July 1868	6 December 1878†	Grey Ministry
5	William Fitzherbert^{3}		14 June 1878	22 April 1887†	Grey Ministry
5	William Fitzherbert^{3}		14 June 1878	22 April 1887†	Hall Ministry; Whitaker Ministry third Atkinson Ministry first Stout–Vogel Ministry fourth Atkinson Ministry
5	William Fitzherbert^{3}		14 June 1878	22 April 1887†	second Stout–Vogel Ministry
6	George Waterhouse^{2}		22 April 1887	21 September 1887	second Stout–Vogel Ministry
(5)	William Fitzherbert 2nd time		21 September 1887	23 January 1891	second Stout–Vogel Ministry
(5)	William Fitzherbert 2nd time		21 September 1887	23 January 1891	Scarecrow Ministry
7	Harry Atkinson^{2}		23 January 1891	28 June 1892†	Liberal Government
8	Henry Miller		8 July 1892	6 October 1897	Liberal Government
8	Henry Miller		6 October 1897	9 July 1903	Liberal Government
9	William Walker		9 July 1903	5 January 1904†	Liberal Government
10	John Rigg (acting)		5 January 1904	7 July 1904	Liberal Government
11	Alfred Cadman		7 July 1904	23 March 1905†	Liberal Government
12	Richard Reeves (acting)		23 March 1905	30 June 1905	Liberal Government
13	Charles Bowen		30 June 1905	4 July 1910^{4}	Liberal Government
13	Charles Bowen		4 July 1910	4 July 1915	Liberal Government
13	Charles Bowen		4 July 1910	4 July 1915	Reform Government
14	Charles Johnston		7 July 1915	13 June 1918†	Reform Government
15	Walter Carncross		1 November 1918	10 July 1924^{4}	Reform Government
15	Walter Carncross		10 July 1924	10 July 1929^{4}	Reform Government
15	Walter Carncross		10 July 1924	10 July 1929^{4}	United Government
15	Walter Carncross		10 July 1929	10 July 1934^{4}	United Government
15	Walter Carncross		10 July 1929	10 July 1934^{4}	United–Reform Coalition
15	Walter Carncross		10 July 1934	18 July 1939	United–Reform Coalition
15	Walter Carncross		10 July 1934	18 July 1939	First Labour Government
16	Mark Fagan		18 July 1939	2 August 1944^{4}	First Labour Government
16	Mark Fagan		2 August 1944	31 December 1947†	First Labour Government
17	Bernard Martin		29 June 1948	8 March 1950	First Labour Government
17	Bernard Martin		29 June 1948	8 March 1950	First National Government
18	Thomas Bishop		15 March 1950	31 December 1951	First National Government

^{1} Later served as premier.
^{2} Previously served as premier.
^{3} Previously speaker of the House of Representatives.
^{4} Reappointed at end of member's term. † Speaker died in office.

== See also ==
- Constitution of New Zealand
- New Zealand Legislative Council
