= 1905 Wellington mayoral election =

New Zealand local election

- 26 April 1905
- Turnout: 9,709 (49.27%)
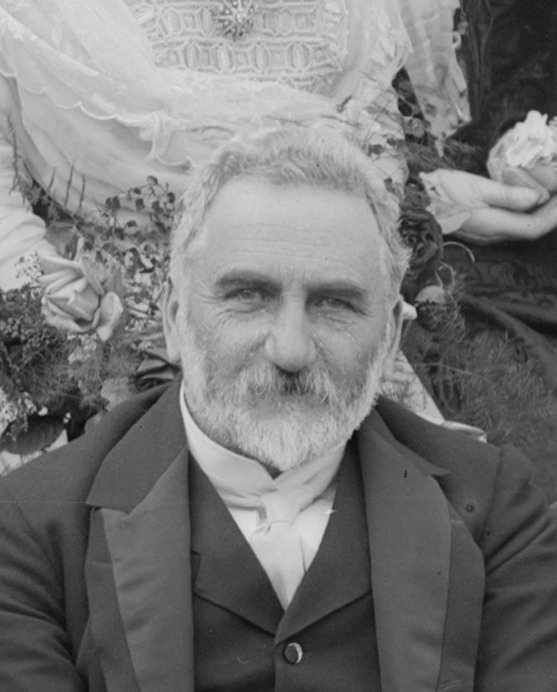

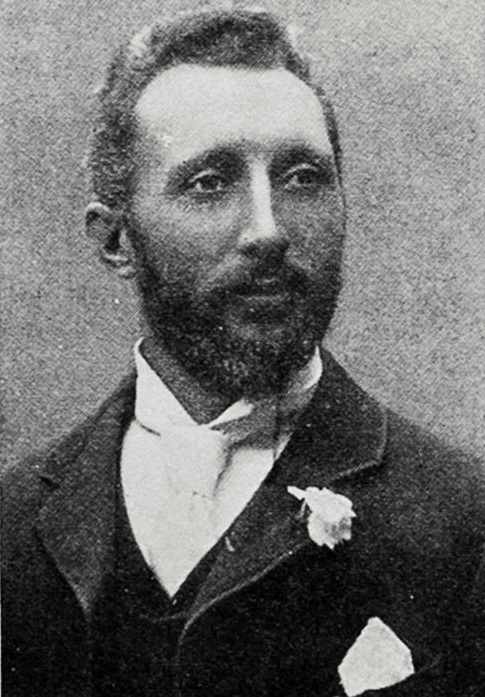

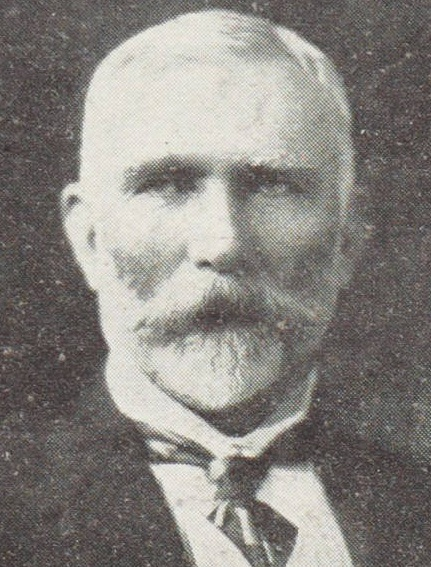

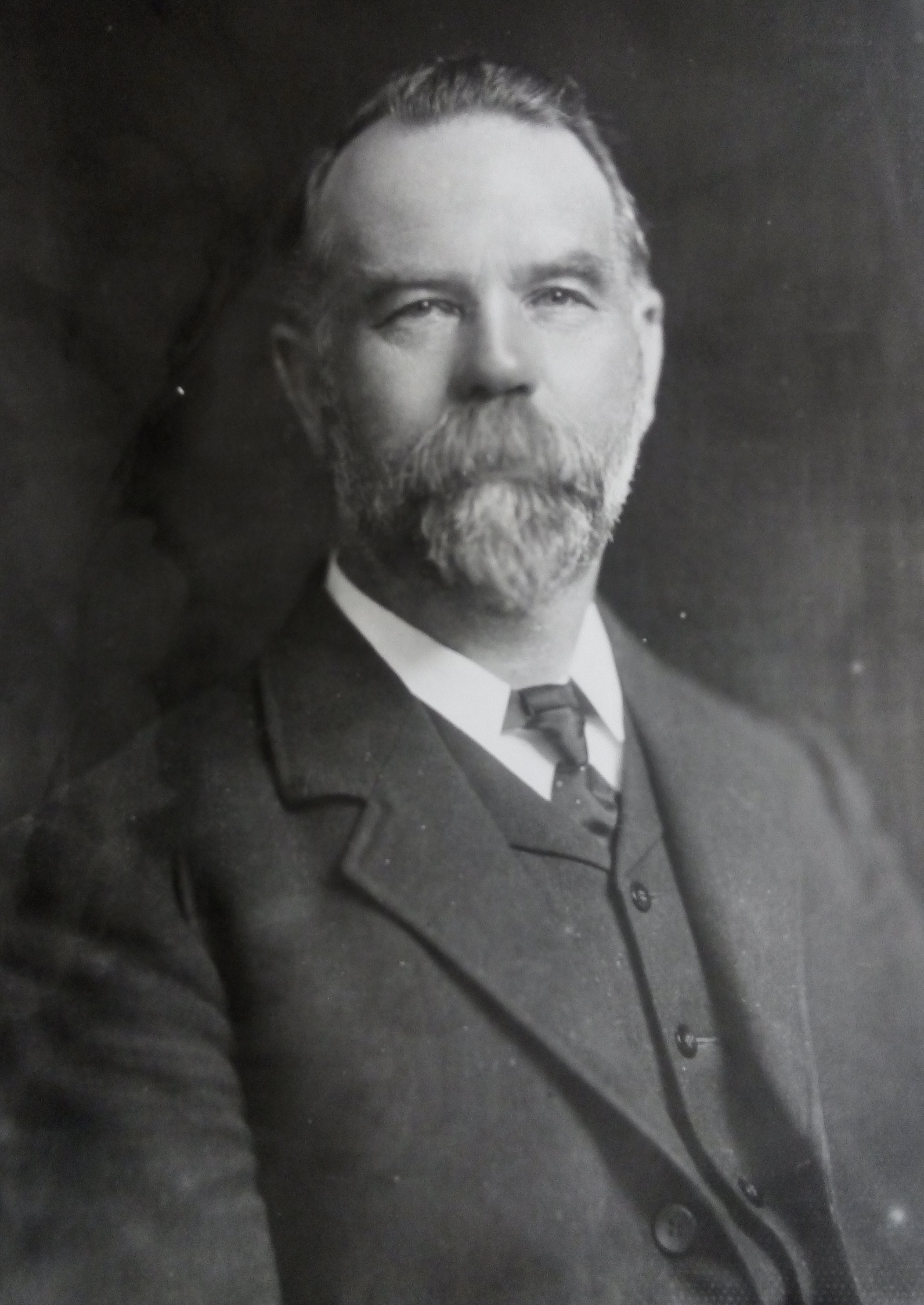
| Candidate | Thomas William Hislop | William Barber |
| Party | Independent | Independent |
| Popular vote | 3,060 | 2,377 |
| Percentage | 31.51 | 24.48 |
| Candidate | James Joseph Devine | John Luke |
| Party | Independent | Independent |
| Popular vote | 1,725 | 1,456 |
| Percentage | 17.76 | 14.99 |
Mayor before election
John Aitken
Elected mayor
Thomas William Hislop

The 1905 Wellington mayoral election was part of the New Zealand local elections held that same year. In 1905, elections were held for the Mayor of Wellington plus other local government positions including fifteen city councillors. The polling was conducted using the standard first-past-the-post electoral method.

== Background ==
John Aitken, the incumbent Mayor did not seek re-election. He was succeeded by Thomas William Hislop, who was elected to office as Mayor of Wellington, beating defeating five other candidates.

== Mayoralty results ==
1905 Wellington mayoral election
| Party | Candidate | Votes | % | ±% |
|---|---|---|---|---|
| Independent | Thomas William Hislop | 3,060 | 31.51 | +6.06 |
| Independent | William Barber | 2,377 | 24.48 | |
| Independent | James Joseph Devine | 1,725 | 17.76 | |
| Independent | John Luke | 1,456 | 14.99 | |
| Independent | Thomas Wardell | 658 | 6.77 | |
| Independent | John Smith | 433 | 4.45 | |
| Majority | | 683 | 7.03 | |
| Turnout | | 9,709 | 49.27 | +4.31 |

== Councillor results ==
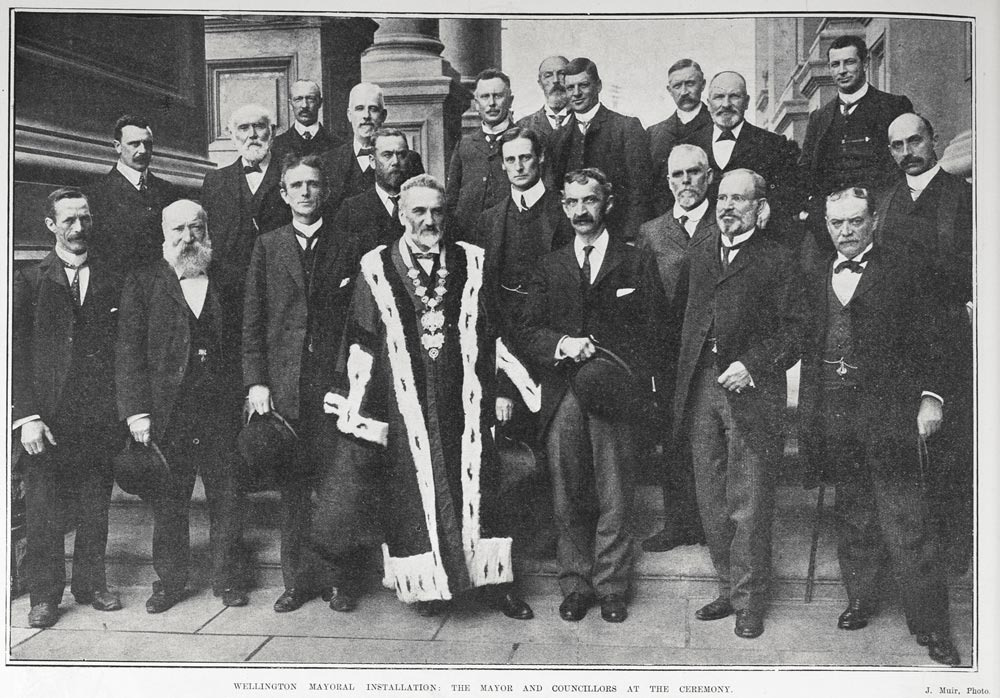
The 1905 Mayoral installation ceremony, attended by the councillors.

1905 Wellington City Council election
| Party | Candidate | Votes | % | ±% |
|---|---|---|---|---|
| Independent | George Winder | 5,896 | 84.32 | −8.89 |
| Independent | Charlie Izard | 5,482 | 78.40 | +9.44 |
| Independent | James Godber | 5,112 | 73.11 | +4.15 |
| Independent | George Wiltshire | 4,940 | 70.65 | +12.80 |
| Independent | Thomas Ballinger | 4,781 | 68.37 | |
| Independent | Folk Cohen | 4,399 | 62.91 | +21.27 |
| Independent | Matthew Murdoch | 4,221 | 60.36 | −24.62 |
| Independent | Augustus Biss | 4,152 | 59.38 | |
| Ind. Labour League | David McLaren | 3,704 | 52.97 | −15.67 |
| Independent | Walter Morrah | 3,445 | 49.27 | |
| Independent | Arthur Gibbs | 3,262 | 46.65 | |
| Independent | Thomas Carmichael | 2,723 | 38.94 | |
| Independent | James Trevor | 2,716 | 38.84 | |
| Independent | George Frost | 2,691 | 38.48 | |
| Ind. Labour League | Alfred Hindmarsh | 2,667 | 38.14 | |
| Independent | Arnold Edwin | 2,568 | 36.72 | |
| Independent | William Shortt | 2,523 | 36.08 | |
| Independent | George Baylis | 2,514 | 35.95 | +2.90 |
| Independent | Charles Palliser | 2,501 | 35.76 | |
| Independent | Arthur Fullford | 2,277 | 32.56 | |
| Independent | Robert Davenport | 2,256 | 32.26 | −9.02 |
| Independent | Alexander Rand | 2,191 | 31.33 | −29.23 |
| Ind. Labour League | Tom Young | 2,132 | 30.49 | |
| Independent | Martin Luckie | 2,131 | 30.47 | |
| Independent | Allan Orr | 2,095 | 29.96 | +3.95 |
| Independent | Victor Braund | 2,090 | 29.89 | |
| Independent | Richard Keene | 2,055 | 29.39 | |
| Ind. Labour League | John Brown | 2,036 | 29.11 | |
| Ind. Labour League | William Hampton | 1,900 | 27.17 | −5.06 |
| Independent | Walter Pearson | 1,704 | 24.37 | |
| Independent | Justinian Powell | 1,634 | 23.36 | |
| Independent | William Lingard | 1,596 | 22.82 | |
| Independent | William Brannigan | 1,574 | 22.51 | |
| Independent | James Reid | 1,548 | 22.13 | |
| Ind. Labour League | Nicholas McGuinness | 1,512 | 21.62 | |
| Independent | William Worth | 1,273 | 18.20 | −11.26 |
| Independent | Francis Loudon | 1,213 | 17.34 | |
| Independent | Edward Peers | 733 | 10.48 | |
| Independent | William McAlpine | 645 | 9.22 | |
