= William Campbell Walker =

New Zealand politician (1837–1904)

The Honourable William Campbell Walker CMG, MLC
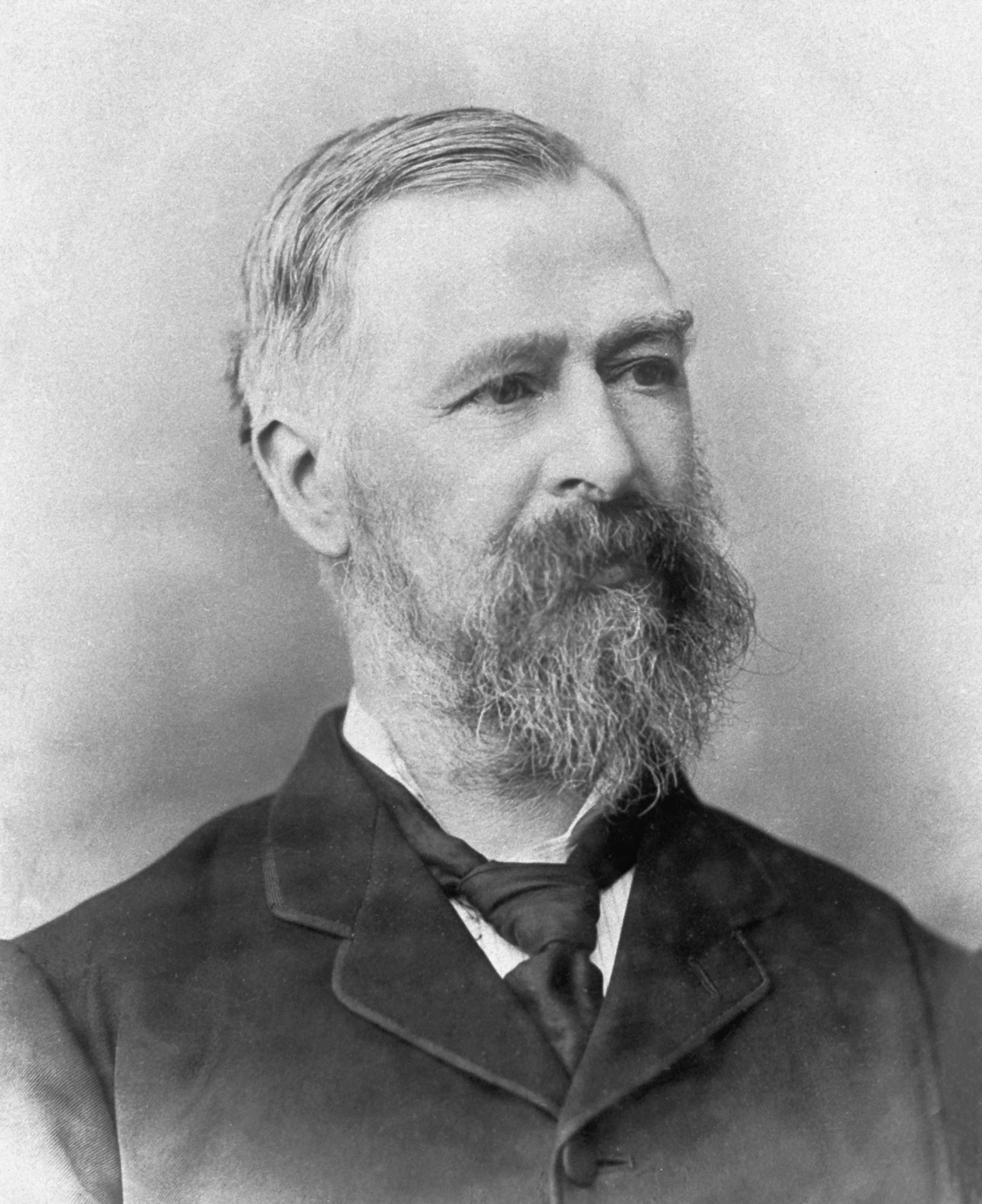
- William Campbell Walker, c. 1890s

9th Speaker of the Legislative Council
- In office 9 July 1903 – 5 January 1904
- Preceded by: Henry Miller
- Succeeded by: John Rigg

Personal details
- Born: 1837 Bowlandstow, Midlothian, Scotland
- Died: 5 January 1904 (aged 66–67) Christchurch, New Zealand
- Party: Liberal Party
- Relations: Frederick de Carteret Malet (brother-in-law)

William Campbell Walker, CMG (1837 – 5 January 1904) was a New Zealand politician.

== Biography ==
Walker was born in 1837, at Bowlandstow, Midlothian, Scotland, the eldest son of Sir William Stuart Walker (KCB). He received his education at Trinity College, Glenalmond in Perthshire and then at Trinity College, Oxford. He graduated in 1861 and then completed a further MA degree. Together with his brother, he emigrated to New Zealand and arrived in Lyttelton on board the Evening Star in January 1862. The brothers then owned and ran a sheep farm at Mount Possession in South Canterbury. When they bought the land, Walker was assigned some land in Riccarton. He later gave the land away, so that a settlement for working-class people could be established.

Walker married Margaret Wilson the daughter of Archdeacon James Wilson. They were to have five sons and one daughter.

New Zealand Parliament
Years	Term	Electorate	Party
1884–1887	9th	Ashburton	Independent
1887–1890	10th	Ashburton	Independent

Walker was the first chairman of the Ashburton County Council from 1877 until 1893. He represented the Ashburton electorate on the Canterbury Provincial Council in the 5th and 7th Council (14 June 1866 – 27 September 1867; 8 April 1874 – 31 October 1876). Walker then represented the Ashburton electorate in Parliament from 1884 to 1890, when he was defeated. He was appointed to the Legislative Council by the Liberal Government on 15 October 1892. He was reappointed on 15 October 1899. He was a member of the Executive Council (20 February 1896 – 23 June 1903), Minister of Immigration (2 March 1896 – 20 June 1903) and Minister of Education (11 March 1896 – 20 June 1903). While he was a minister, he mostly lived in Wellington. He was created a Companion of the Order of St Michael and St George (CMG) in June 1901, on the occasion of the visit of TRH the Duke and Duchess of Cornwall and York (later King George V and Queen Mary) to New Zealand. Walker ended his career as the Speaker of the Legislative Council from 9 July 1903 until his death.

He was a member of the Board of Governors of Canterbury College. As a member of the cabinet, he was instrumental in passing the act that provided for the separation of the Agricultural College from the college proper. He was a member of the Land Board of Canterbury from 1891 until 1896.

Walker died on 5 January 1904 and was buried three days later at Sydenham Cemetery. He was survived by his wife and his six children.

== Notes ==
Political offices
Preceded by William Pember Reeves	Minister of Education; 1896–1903	Succeeded by Richard Seddon
Preceded by Henry Miller	Speaker of the New Zealand Legislative Council; 1903–1904	Succeeded by John Rigg
New Zealand Parliament
Preceded by Edward George Wright	Member of Parliament for Ashburton; 1884–1890	Succeeded by Edward George Wright
