= Robert Fletcher (New Zealand politician) =

New Zealand politician

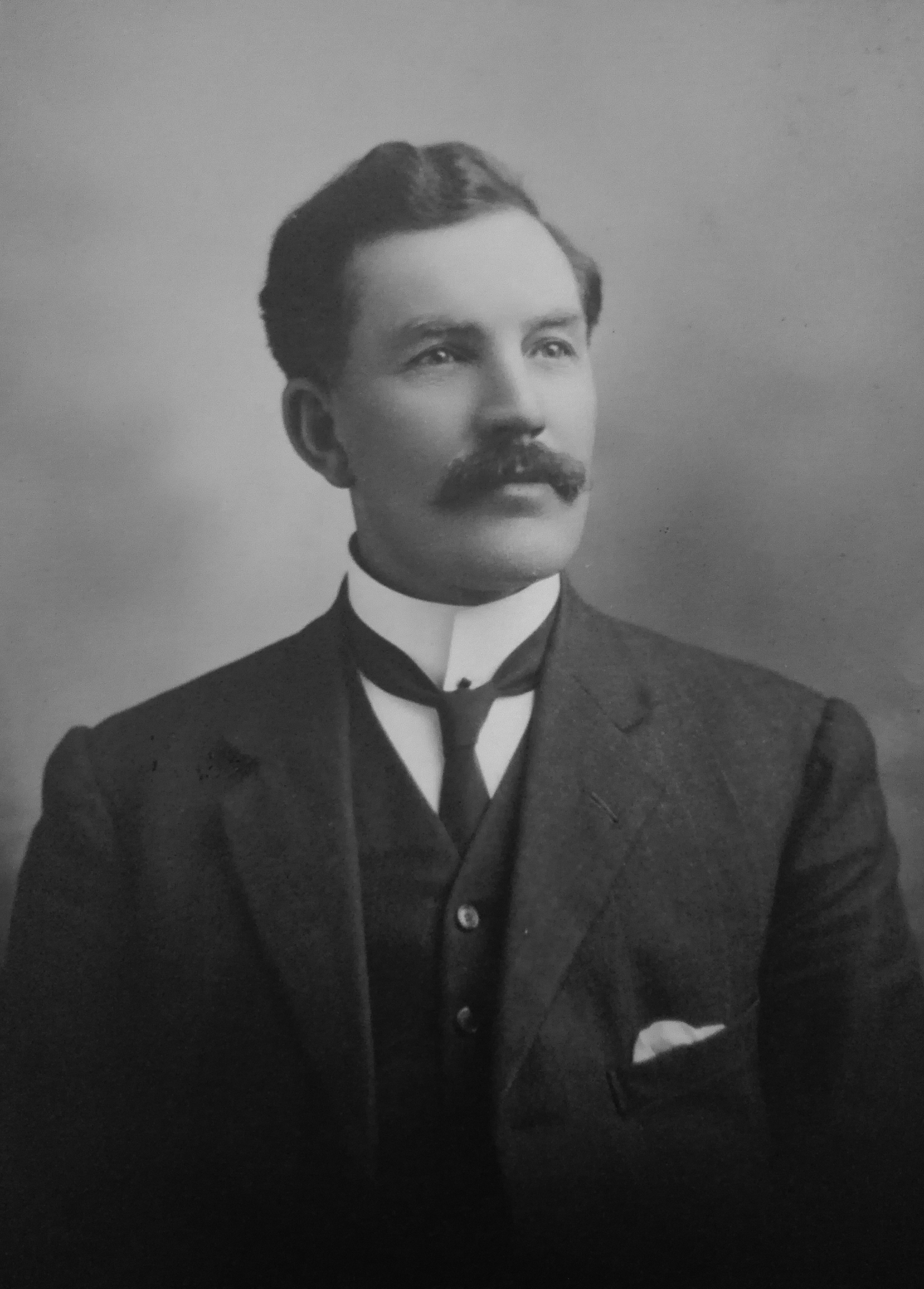

Member of the New Zealand Parliament for Wellington Central
- In office 10 December 1914 – 4 September 1918
- Preceded by: Francis Fisher
- Succeeded by: Peter Fraser

Personal details
- Born: 3 July 1863 St Andrews, Fife, Scotland
- Died: 4 September 1918 (aged 55) Wellington, New Zealand
- Spouse: Frances Sarah Aspland (m. 1884)

Robert Fletcher (3 July 1863 – 4 September 1918) was a New Zealand politician of the Liberal Party.

== Early life and family ==
Fletcher was born in St Andrews, Fife, Scotland, on 3 July 1863, the son of David Fletcher and his wife Margaret Ann Duncan. After briefly working for the Midland Railway Company, he became a sailor for eight years with the Dundee Shipping Line, and arrived in New Zealand in 1883. He worked as a sailor in coastal shipping until 1885, when he became a pilot for the Wellington Harbour Board and, later, worked on the wharves. He was a prominent Freemason in Wellington.

== Political career ==
=== Local-body politics ===
Fletcher was elected as a member of the Wellington Harbour Board in 1906, and held his seat until his death in 1918. He served as the board's chair between 1910 and 1915. From 1907 to 1915 he was also a member of the Wellington City Council. Fletcher contested the 1915 mayoralty contest, coming second to incumbent Mayor John Luke.

=== Member of Parliament ===
New Zealand Parliament
| Years | Term | Electorate | Party |
|---|---|---|---|
| 1914–1918 | 19th | Wellington Central | Liberal |

The Wellington Central electorate was formed for the 1905 election, and it was held from the beginning by Francis Fisher (known as Rainbow Fisher for his frequent changes of political allegiance). The 1911 general election required a second ballot if no candidate could achieve an absolute majority in the first round. The election was contested by Fisher (for the Reform Party), Fletcher, Tom Young (Labour Party) and Frank Freeman (Socialist Party), with Fisher having a majority of one vote over Fletcher. In the second ballot a week later, Fisher beat Fletcher with a majority of 150 votes. By the next general election in 1914, the incumbent Fisher as a government minister contested Wellington Central against Fletcher again, and he was decisively beaten by 2677 votes to 4910.

Fletcher represented Wellington Central in Parliament until 4 September 1918, when he died at his home in Wellington, having been in poor health for over a year. The by-election caused by his death was won by future Prime Minister Peter Fraser of the Labour Party.

Political offices
| Preceded by Thomas Wilford | Chair of Wellington Harbour Board; 1910–1915 | Succeeded by Charles Edward Daniell |
New Zealand Parliament
| Preceded by Francis Fisher | Member of Parliament for Wellington Central; 1914–1918 | Succeeded by Peter Fraser |
