= Michael Reardon (activist) =

New Zealand politician (1876–1945)

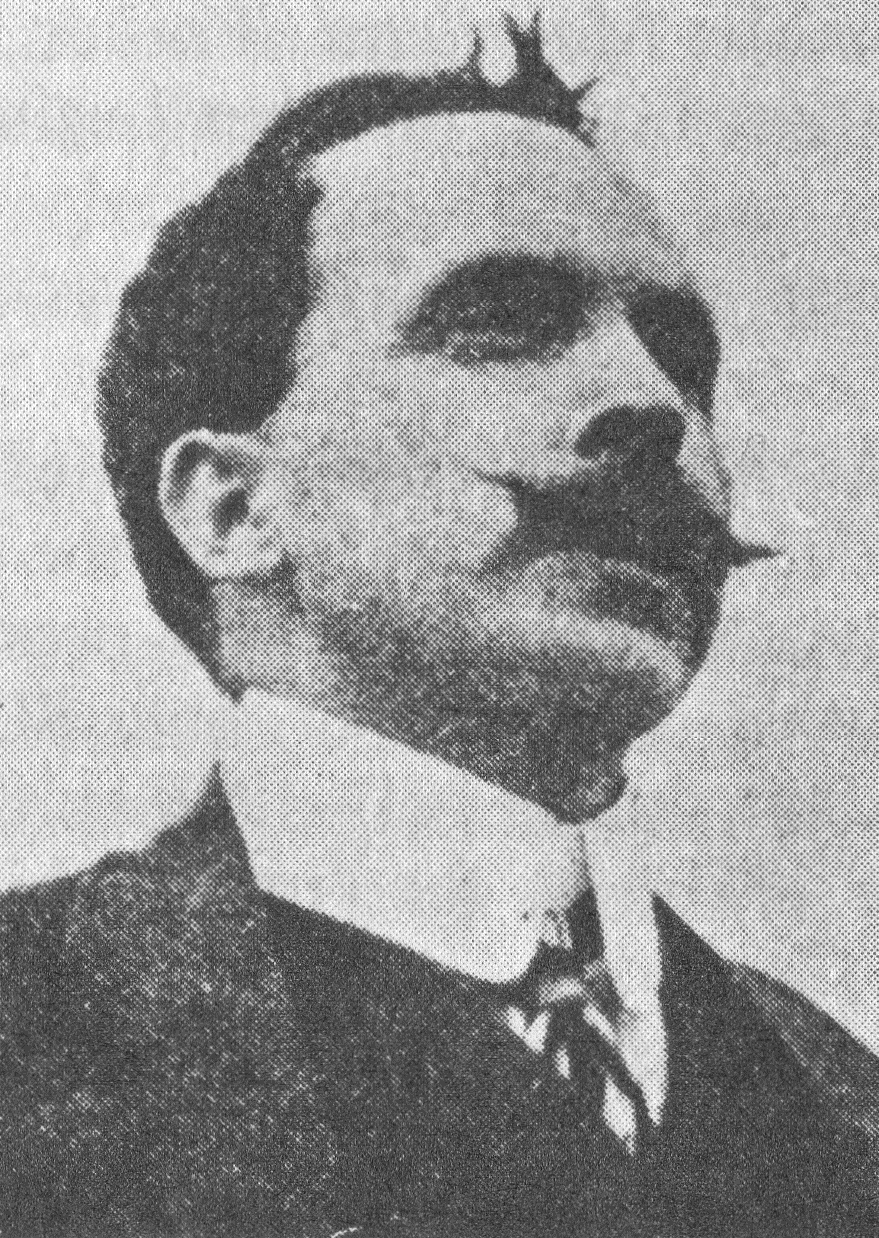
Michael Reardon.

Michael John Reardon (11 April 1876 – 24 August 1945) was a New Zealand political activist.

== Biography ==
=== Early life ===
Reardon was born at Waikouaiti in 1876 and was educated there. He became a blacksmith and later a freezing worker.

=== Union involvement ===
He moved to Wellington in 1906 and was appointed Secretary of the General Labourers' Union in 1906, a position he held until 1918. He was president of the Wellington Trades and Labour Council from 1912 to 1913 and again from 1915 to 1916. During World War I he supported conscription, unlike most labour activists. He helped form the Wellington branch of the Workers' Educational Association (WEA) in 1915 and was a key figure in the Self-determination for Ireland League 1920–1921. Later, Reardon was Secretary Wellington Retail Fruit Trade Association.

He was appointed information officer for New Zealand at the 1924 British Empire Exhibition. He was deputy-chairman of the Repatriation Board in 1919–1921. In 1936 he was appointed Conciliation Commissioner a position he held until 1943.

=== Political activity ===
In 1902 he stood as a Liberal-Labour candidate in Rangitikei and in 1911 as the Labour candidate for Hutt. In 1918 he sought the Labour nomination for the Wellington Central by-election, but lost to Peter Fraser. Later that year he was nominated by the Wellington Trade's and Labour Council for the Labour nomination in the Wellington South by-election, but was defeated by Bob Semple.

Reardon was a Labour Party candidate in several Wellington municipal elections in 1907, 1909, 1910, 1911, 1913 and 1935. While usually polling respectably he never won a seat.

=== Later life and death ===
He died in Wellington on 24 August 1945, predeceased by his wife and son.
