= Judy Siers =

New Zealand writer and historian

Judith Shelby Siers (born 1937) is a New Zealand writer and historian. In 2008 she won a Montana New Zealand Book Award.

== Biography ==
In 1981 a film made by her and her husband Jim Siers, titled Eye of the Octopus, sold for more than $500,000 at the Cannes Film Festival to Germany, Britain, South Africa, and Italy. She was the judge of the young writers section at the 1981 Katherine Mansfield Literary Award.

In 1994 Siers won a by-election and was elected a member of the Wellington City Council for the Onslow Ward, standing for the centre-right Citizens' Association ticket, she defeated former deputy mayor Helene Ritchie. Re-elected at the next three elections, she was defeated at the 2004 election.

She was an inaugural member of the committee that established the Wellington Writers Walk.

In 2005 she left Wellington and moved to Napier. In 2007 her book on the life of architect James Chapman-Taylor was published. In 2008, the book won the biography category of the New Zealand Book Awards.

== Publications ==
- Siers, J. (2021). Solway College: A place I call home. Wellington, N.Z: Millwood.
- Siers, J., Hobbs, S., Olphert, L., & New Zealand Riding for the Disabled Association. (2018). Walk on, walk on: Hutt Valley Riding for the Disabled 1978-2018. Upper Hutt, N.Z.
- Siers, J., & Wellington Historical & Early Settlers' Association. (2012). 100 years: The story of the Wellington Historical & Early Settlers' Association, 1912-2012. Wellington, N.Z: Millwood Heritage Productions.
- Siers, J., & King George's Hall Committee. (2011). King George's Hall, 1911-2011: Bay View, Napier. Napier, N.Z: King George's Hall Committee.
- Siers, J. (2007). The life and times of James Walter Chapman-Taylor. Napier, N.Z: Millwood.
- Siers, J. & Shepherd, W. (1992). The botanic garden: A celebration of a garden. Wellington, N.Z: Wellington City Council.
- Siers, J. (1992). A town hall for the 21st century. Wellington, N.Z: Millwood Press.
