= Tom Young (trade unionist) =

New Zealand seaman & trade unionist

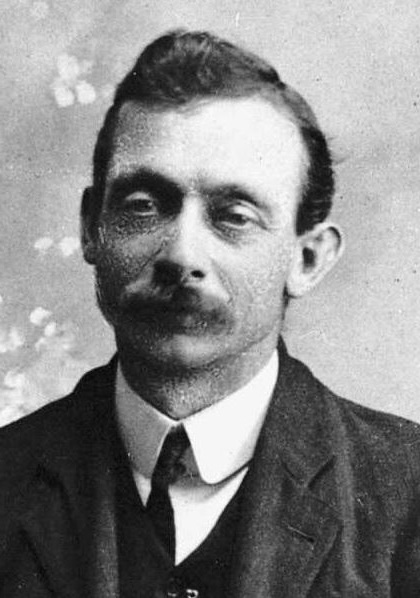
Tom Young

William Thomas Young (27 April 1870 – 20 September 1953) was a New Zealand seaman and trade unionist.

== Biography ==
Young was born in Karori, Wellington, New Zealand in 1870. He married Margaret Anne Craig in 1906.

He stood in the 1908 election as an independent Labour candidate in the Wellington Suburbs electorate and was defeated in the first ballot. He stood in the 1911 election for the original Labour Party in the Wellington Central electorate and was again defeated in the first ballot. In 1918 he was nominated by the Painters Union for the Labour nomination in the Wellington South by-election, but was defeated by Bob Semple.

Young was a Labour Party candidate in several Wellington municipal elections in 1905, 1907, 1913, 1915, 1921, 1923, 1925 and 1927.

He died at Karori, Wellington.
