= John Rigg =

New Zealand politician

The Honourable John Rigg MLC
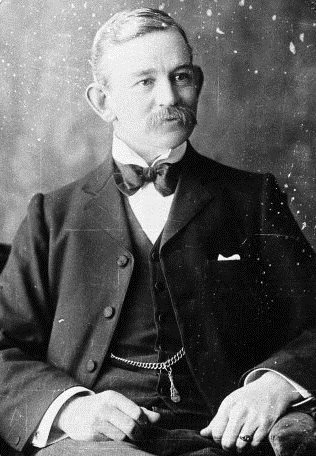
- Rigg in 1908.

10th Speaker of the Legislative Council (acting)
- In office 5 January 1904 – 7 July 1904
- Preceded by: William Campbell Walker
- Succeeded by: Alfred Cadman

Personal details
- Born: 1 January 1858 St Kilda, Victoria, Australia
- Died: 20 October 1943 (aged 85) Christchurch, New Zealand
- Party: Labour Party
- Spouse: Louise Rigg

The Hon. John Rigg MLC CMG (1 November 1858 – 20 October 1943) was a New Zealand politician of the Labour Party.

== Biography ==
Rigg was born in St Kilda, Colony of Victoria in 1858 and was a typographer and union secretary. His family came to New Zealand in 1863 or 1864 and initially settled in Dunedin, before moving to Wellington where Rigg received his education. He was the first President of the Independent Political Labour League in 1905. Following his father's job loss, Rigg had to leave school aged twelve years to support the family financially.

John Rigg experienced poverty and unemployment and this caused 'his private revolution'. He describes this and refers to his Scottish noble heritage: 'found in me the makings of a snob and left me a Socialist.'.

John Rigg became active in leading apprentice printers rights and women's rights and later expressed this through his 1892 roles of president of the Wellington Tailoresses' Union, Trades and Labour Council, and Typographical Society.

He was first appointed to the Legislative Council as a Labour representative on 15 October 1892, as one of four moderate union leaders appointed. He resigned on 27 May 1893. He was appointed again a fortnight later on 6 June 1893. At the end of the seven-year terms, he was reappointed on 6 June 1900 and 1 July 1907. Rigg was elected Chairman of Committees on 8 July 1903 and held that title until 6 July 1904. He took part in an official tour of the Pacific Islands with other New Zealand members of parliament in 1903. He was Acting Speaker from 5 January to 7 July 1904. Because he refused to condemn the 1913 waterfront strike in Wellington, the Reform Government did not reappoint him to the Legislative Council in 1914.

Rigg sought the Labour Party nominations for the 1914 and 1919 elections, but was not successful.

He moved to Christchurch around 1920 and his political activity stopped. In 1937, the First Labour Government acknowledged Rigg's contribution to the formation of the party by awarding him a CMG. He died in Christchurch on 20 October 1943 and was buried two days later at Bromley Cemetery. He was survived by his second wife Louise Rigg, who died in 1955.

== Notes ==
Political offices
Preceded by William Cowper Smith	Chairman of Committees of the Legislative Council; 1903–1904	Succeeded by Richard Reeves
Preceded by William Campbell Walker	Speaker of the New Zealand Legislative Council acting 1904	Succeeded by Alfred Cadman
Party political offices
Preceded by Tom Paul	President of the United Labour Party; 1913–1914	Succeeded by David McLaren
Preceded by new office	President of the Independent Political Labour League; 1904–1905	Succeeded by Jim Munro
