= Alfred Hindmarsh =

New Zealand politician, lawyer and unionist

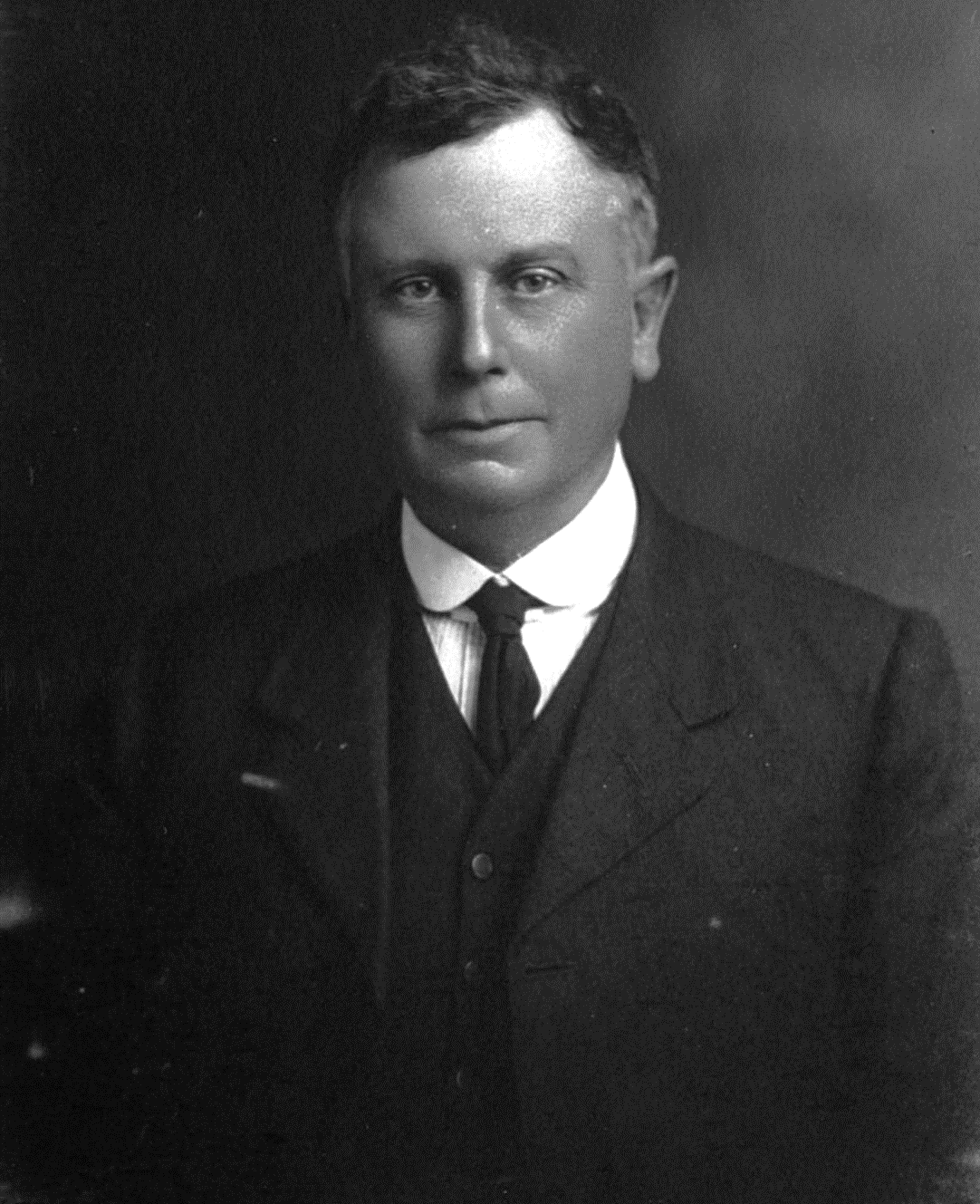

1st Leader of the Labour Party
- In office 7 July 1916 – 13 November 1918
- Succeeded by: Harry Holland

Member of the New Zealand Parliament for Wellington South
- In office 14 December 1911 – 13 November 1918
- Preceded by: Robert Wright
- Succeeded by: Bob Semple

Member of the Wellington City Council
- In office 27 April 1905 – 8 May 1915
- Constituency: At-large

Personal details
- Born: 18 April 1860 Port Elliot, South Australia, Australia
- Died: 13 November 1918 (aged 58) Wellington, New Zealand
- Party: Labour
- Other political affiliations: United Labour (1912–16); Labour (1910–12); IPLL (1904–10)
- Spouse: Winifred Taylor (m. 1892–1916)
- Relations: John Hindmarsh (grandfather)
- Children: 4
- Profession: Lawyer

Alfred Humphrey Hindmarsh (18 April 1860 – 13 November 1918) was a New Zealand politician, lawyer, and unionist. He died in the 1918 influenza epidemic. He served as the first leader of the modern New Zealand Labour Party.

== Early life ==
Hindmarsh was born in Port Elliot, Australia, and was the grandson of Rear-Admiral John Hindmarsh, the first Governor of South Australia. His grandfather was recalled to England in 1838, but his father, also named John Hindmarsh, returned to South Australia and worked as a lawyer. Alfred Hindmarsh lost his mother when he was ten, and his father remarried. He was educated at St Peter's College in Adelaide.

The family moved to Napier, New Zealand, in 1878. Hindmarsh trained as a lawyer in Dunedin and was admitted to the bar in 1891, when he briefly worked in Christchurch at the Supreme Court (since renamed the High Court). He settled in Wellington, living in Derwent Street, Island Bay. While living there, he married Winifred Taylor on 3 October 1892.

Taylor was his Irish housekeeper and the decision raised eyebrows among his relatives, considering her "under his station". The two had a loving relationship and Hindmarsh regarded the decision as reaffirming the rejection of the class system he was fighting against.

== Early career ==
Politically, Hindmarsh was left-wing (though his contemporaries never described him as being a true socialist) and held a number of positions in the local labour movement. Most notably, he headed the Wellington branch of the Seamen's Union during the internal disputes of the 1890s. In this role, he argued against the traditional alignment of unions with the governing Liberal Party, instead advocating an independent labour voice in Parliament.

In 1901, Hindmarsh himself stood for the Wellington City Council but was unsuccessful, coming in third to last with only 2,028 votes. However, in 1905, backed by the new Independent Political Labour League (IPLL), which he had helped found, he was elected. He remained a city councillor until 1915. Between 1906 and 1907, he served as the League's president. As a councillor Hindmarsh di not allow his party affiliation to solely determine how he voted, as was the case with other labour councillors David McLaren and Edward Tregear.

In 1911, he was first elected to the Wellington Harbour Board as a representative of the Wellington City constituency.

== Member of Parliament ==
New Zealand Parliament
Years	Term	Electorate	Party
1911–1912	18th	Wellington South	Labour
1912–1914	Changed allegiance to:		United Labour
1914–1916	19th	Wellington South	United Labour
1916–1918	Changed allegiance to:		Labour

In the 1905 general election, Hindmarsh stood as an IPLL candidate for Parliament in the Newtown electorate. Of the four candidates, he came a distant last. In the 1911 general election, he was elected in Wellington South as a candidate for the original Labour Party in the second ballot. Hindmarsh was one of four Labour candidates elected in 1911, he was assisted in his campaign in Wellington South by two future Labour MPs, Jim Thorn and Walter Nash who were delighted at the party's success.

In the following year, 1912, the party was relaunched as the United Labour Party, with Hindmarsh still a member. In 1913, the United Labour Party itself agreed to merge with the Socialist Party to form the Social Democratic Party (SDP), but Hindmarsh believed that the resulting party would be too extreme. Hindmarsh chose became one of a group of United Labour loyalists who remained outside the SDP, forming a loosely organised "remnant" faction.

In July 1915, when the SDP and the United Labour remnant (along with a labour-aligned independent) agreed to form a united caucus, Hindmarsh was selected as the groups chairman. One month later a national coalition government was established in response to the severity of World War I. The leader of the Liberal Party, Sir Joseph Ward, invited Hindmarsh to be a member of the cabinet (potentially as Minister of Justice) in the national ministry as the representative of the Labour Party. However, Hindmarsh declined the offer and the Labour caucus decided to maintain its independence by not joining the national ministry. The exact nature of the offer was later disputed by Paddy Webb, then an SDP Member of Parliament and later a cabinet minister in the first Labour government. In response to a suggestion in 1940 that another wartime coalition be formed, former Prime Minister George Forbes cited the precedent of Ward offering a cabinet post to Hindmarsh. Webb contested that an offer was made to the Labour grouping, claiming it was made just to individual Labour MPs. With Ward joining the national ministry as Minister of Finance and the Liberal Party being now part of the government this left Labour as the largest party not in government. Contrary to convention Hindmarsh was not officially recognised as the Leader of the Opposition with Ward still retaining the title, albeit in name only.

In July 1916, most of the caucus agreed to establish the modern Labour Party — Hindmarsh was chosen to remain the new party's parliamentary leader during its period of establishment, a position he held until his death. While occupying the position of chairman, Hindmarsh was noted to be a man of great personal attraction and was easily able to establish friendships, even when differing opinions were concerned. This was of great benefit in his position as the recently formed Labour Party had many individuals with both differing personalities and clashing ideas. The addition of more radical Labour MPs like Harry Holland and Peter Fraser to the caucus (both via by-elections in 1918) Hindmarsh's ability to manage Labour's MPs became more difficult, admitting that he found the pair to be "wild-eyed". This led to speculation he may have fallen out with them as time went on.

One of the largest policy disagreements he had with more radical Labour MPs was conscription. Hindmarsh differed from most of his party colleagues by not opposing conscription and two of his sons fought in the war. He clarified his stance by stating "I do not object to conscription... [but] the State has a duty to the individual". When Labour MP Paddy Webb was arrested in May 1917 for sedition, by making an anti-conscription speech at a West Coast coal mine, there was speculation that the pro-conscription Hindmarsh might also be apprehended merely by association to Webb. Though this was not to be the case.

== Death ==
Winifred Hindmarsh died in 1916. Alfred Hindmarsh died in Wellington in office on 13 November 1918 in the influenza epidemic of 1918. He was survived by four children. His eight-year-old son Tom went to the Star of the Sea orphanage in Miramar, but on weekends he was cared for by his 14-year-old sister Sybil.

== Notes ==
New Zealand Parliament
Preceded by Robert Wright	Member of Parliament for Wellington South; 1911–1918	Succeeded by Bob Semple
Party political offices
New title	Leader of the Labour Party; 1916–1918	Succeeded by Harry Holland
