= United Labour Party (New Zealand) =

United Labour Party of New Zealand
- Abbreviation: ULP
- Founded: 7 April 1912
- Dissolved: 7 July 1916; 108 years ago
- Preceded by: Labour Party (1910)
- Succeeded by: Labour Party
- Ideology: Social democracy
- Political position: Centre-left to left-wing
- International affiliation: International Socialist Bureau
- Colours: Red

The United Labour Party (ULP) of New Zealand was an early centre-left to left-wing political party. Founded in 1912, it represented the more moderate wing of the labour movement. In 1916 it joined with other political groups to establish the modern Labour Party.

== Origins ==
The United Labour Party has its origins in the first Labour Party, a distinct organisation from the modern one. The first Labour Party had been established in 1910 after the perceived failure of its predecessor, the Independent Political Labour League. The Labour Party represented the moderate wing of the labour movement, with the Socialist Party representing the more radical faction.

== Initial unification ==
By 1912 there was growing recognition that the division of the labour movement was costing votes, and a "unity conference" was called. The Socialists and the associated Federation of Labour (the "Red Feds") refused to attend, however, saying that they would continue to advocate their more hard-line positions. As such, the Unity Conference consisted only of the Labour Party, various moderate trade unions, and independent labour candidates.

At the conclusion of the conference, it was agreed that the Labour Party, the moderate unions, and a number of independents would together form a new party. The new group was called the United Labour Party. The outcome of the conference was slightly disappointing for its organisers, as it had been hoped that the Socialists would join, but hopes for the new party were nevertheless high.

Later the same year, the Waihi miners' strike occurred. The labour movement was split, with hard-liners praising the strikers and moderates condemning the action as dangerous and misguided. The United Labour Party took the latter path, believing that cautious negotiation was more effective than militant action. The strike was eventually suppressed by the government of William Massey, with one miner being killed.

The strike created much disunity in the labour movement, and many believed that active measures were necessary to bring the movement closer together. As such, another "Unity Conference" was called in 1913. This time, the Socialist Party was willing to attend. After extensive negotiations, it was decided that the labour movement should speak with a single voice, and that the United Labour Party and the Socialist Party should merge. The new party would be called the Social Democratic Party. The union elements of the United Labour Party would be merged with the Socialist-affiliated Federation of Labour to produce the new United Federation of Labour.

== Fractionalization ==
Socialist; Party (1901)	Independent; Political; Labour; League (1905)
(independents)	Labour Party (original) (1910)
United Labour; Party (1912)
Social Democratic; Party (1913)	(remnants)
Labour Party (1916)

Some members of the United Labour Party did not accept the decision to merge, however. Of particular concern to them was a clause in the Social Democratic Party's charter that obliged it to support strikes in certain circumstances. These members decided to remain outside the Social Democrats, and continued to use the United Labour label. They became unofficially known as the United Labour Party Remnant. The Remnant officially repudiated the more Marxist tendencies that the Social Democrats had inherited from the Socialist Party, and promoted arbitration as a better alternative to strike action. The Remnant considered itself to be vindicated when, later in the year, the Social Democrats were thrown into disarray by a heavy-handed government response to dockworkers' and miners' strikes. In the 1914 elections, the United Labour Party Remnant won three seats in Parliament, with the victorious candidates being Alfred Hindmarsh, Bill Veitch, and Andrew Walker while the Social Democrats won two seats, and a labour-aligned independent John Payne won another seat.

== Creation of the present Labour Party ==
Despite the differences between the United Labour Party Remnant and the Social Democrat Party, the two worked together in Parliament after the 1914 election. Alfred Hindmarsh of the United Labour Party served as the leader of the six labour-aligned MPs. Gradually, this increased co-operation caused the ULP Remnant and the SDP to conclude that full unification was not impossible, and in 1916, the two finally came together (along with various independents) to form the Labour Party, which still survives today.

== List of presidents ==
- Tom Paul 1912–13
- John Rigg 1913–14
- David McLaren 1914–15
- Alfred Hindmarsh 1915–16
