= New Zealand Socialist Party =

- Founded: 28 July 1901
- Dissolved: 1 July 1913; 111 years ago
- Merged into: Social Democratic Party
- Ideology: Marxism; Socialism
- Political position: Left-wing

The New Zealand Socialist Party was founded in 1901, promoting the works of Karl Marx and Friedrich Engels. The group, despite being relatively moderate when compared with many other socialists, met with little tangible success, but it nevertheless had considerable impact on the development of New Zealand socialism. It later merged in 1913 with a faction of the United Labour Party to form the Social Democratic Party.

== History ==
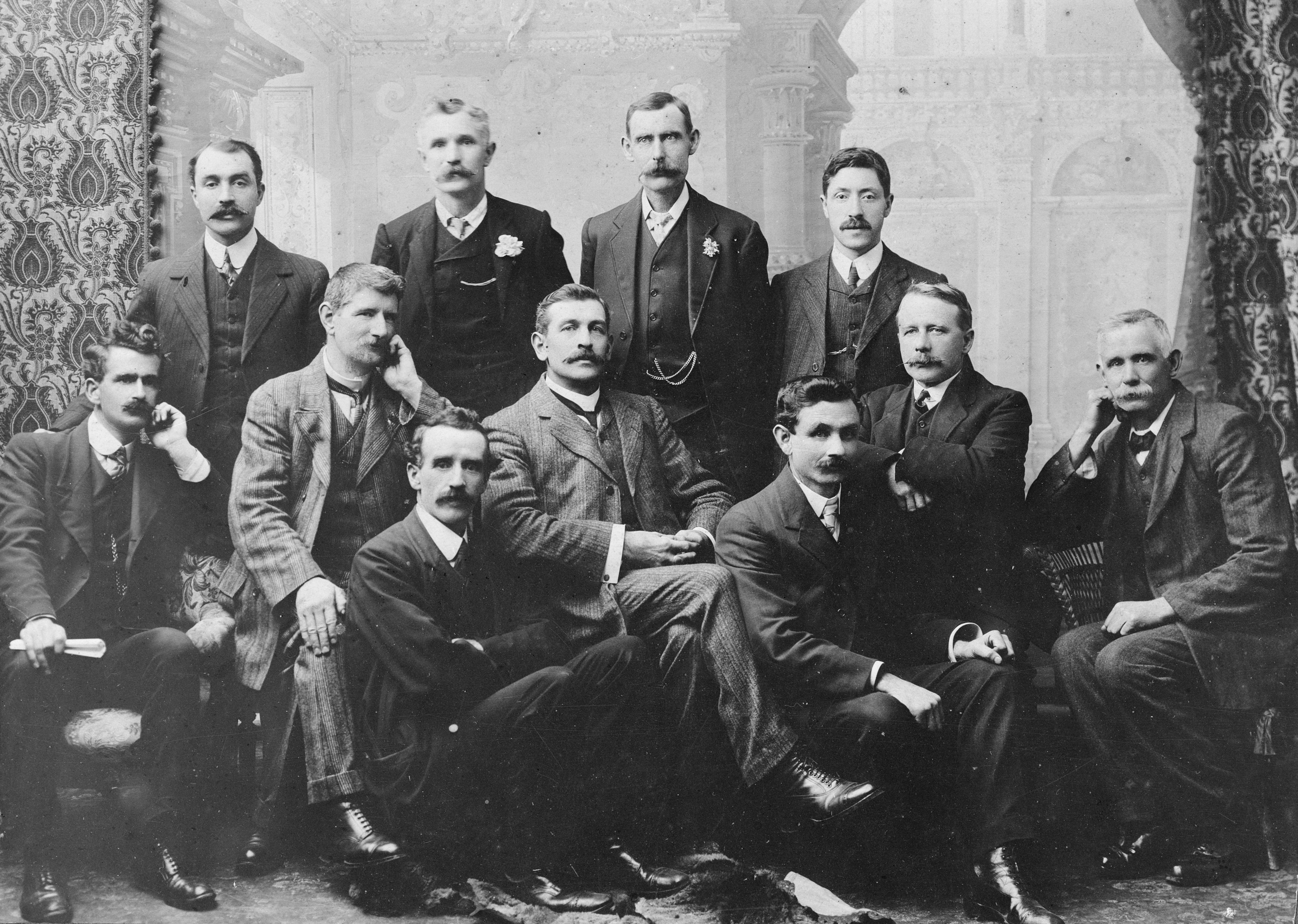
Delegates to the fourth annual conference of the New Zealand Socialist Party, held in Dunedin in 1911.

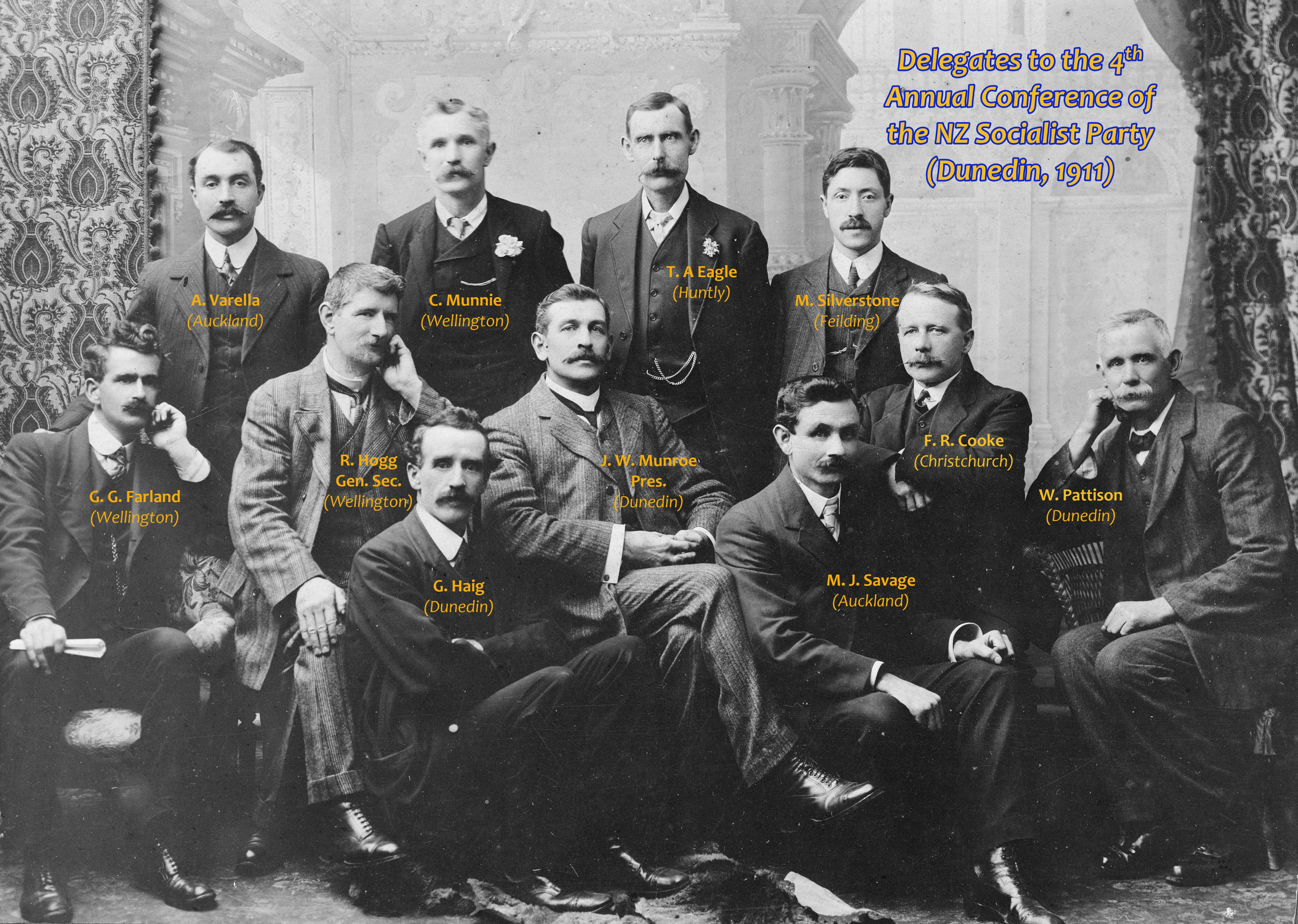
Fourth Annual Conference, NZ Socialist Party (Dunedin, 1911 – sitters named in image)

The party was founded by members of the 'Clarionettes', a group of about 190 English Socialist immigrants recruited through William Ranstead's weekly publication. The original goal was to establish a socialist colony, though the colony was never organised. The Wellington branch of the party was founded on 28 July 1901, and the Christchurch branch in January 1902. The initial members were followers of Robert Blatchford's works.

Some of the most prominent leaders of the party were English-born Frederick Cooke and Ted Howard. Visitors from England were Tom Mann in 1902 and 1908 and Ben Tillett in 1907. Robert Rivers La Monte from America was (briefly) an organiser for the party: he was a member of the "Wobblies": the IWW Industrial Workers of the World.

By 1903, Robert Hogg was publishing a party journal called the Commonweal in Wellington. The party was not prolifically active and stood no candidates at the 1902 election. The party received new vigor with the entry of several radical unionists from Australia including Paddy Webb, Bob Semple, Michael Joseph Savage and Harry Holland.

Others of the Australian cohort, while less radical and active in attempts to enter the political sphere, were still invested in significant social change; Thomas Eagle, who was a carpenter by trade, was an example of those members who stood as representational of the local and regional labouring workforce, and championed issues for such groups accordingly, such as the open accessibility of education and resources to all people. Amongst early issues raised by Eagle that he brought to New Zealand was his campaign for public libraries to be open on Sundays, assumedly so that blue-collar workers (who then worked 6 days a week before the implementation of the 8-8-8 workdays model) would be able to access books and media collections on their single day off.

By 1908 the party was tested by the Blackball miners strike and membership had increased to 3,000 by April of that year. Also that year the Socialist Party held its first national conference in Wellington. Many of the early leaders were from the UK and Australia, where radical ideologies were not uncommon among political parties, but were seen as "out of touch" in New Zealand, where more moderate platforms were the norm. As such the party failed to gain much traction.

A different group, the Socialist Party of New Zealand, was founded in 1930 and became the World Socialist Party (New Zealand).

== Policies ==
At the outset the Socialist Party had a traditionally leftist platform. Its members possessed Marxian views of class struggle—an ideology not uncommonly held by the sort (and class) of individuals flooding into New Zealand at the time, from around the British Empire—and advocated the overthrowing of capitalism by way of political and industrial action. The intent was that this action was to make way for "the socialisation of the means of production, distribution and exchange."

== Election results ==
Socialist; Party (1901)	Independent; Political; Labour; League (1905)
(independents)	Labour Party (original) (1910)
United Labour; Party (1912)
Social Democratic; Party (1913)	(remnants)
Labour Party (1916)

Election Results
Election	candidates	seats won	votes	percentage
1905	2	0	194	0.04%
1908	5	0	2,521	0.58%
1911	8	0	9,091	1.90%

== Bibliography ==
- Bennett, James (2004). Rats and Revolutionaries:The Labour Movement in Australia and New Zealand 1890-1940. Dunedin, NZ: University of Otago Press. ISBN 978-1-877276-49-1.
- Brown, Bruce (1962). The Rise of New Zealand Labour: A history of the New Zealand Labour Party. Wellington: Price Milburn.
