= Independent Political Labour League =

- Abbreviation: IPLL
- Founded: 1904
- Dissolved: 1910; 116 years ago
- Split from: Liberal Party
- Succeeded by: Labour Party (1910)
- Ideology: Democratic socialism
- Political position: Left-wing
- Colours: Red

The Independent Political Labour League (IPLL) was a small New Zealand political party. It was the second organised political party to win a seat in the House of Representatives, and was a forerunner of the modern Labour Party.

== Formation ==
The IPLL was the product of a gradual move towards an independent working-class political vehicle. Previously, most workers supported the powerful Liberal Party, which had dominated Parliament since its creation. Eventually, however, the pace of reform began to slow, and calls arose for an independent workers' party. In 1904, the annual conference of Trades and Labour Councils called for the formation of a new organisation. This party would be focused solely on workers, unlike the Liberal Party, but would be committed to change through reform, unlike the revolution-minded Socialist Party. A constitution was drawn up in late 1904, and the first conference was held in early 1905, with John Rigg elected as the first president. At the conference, it was claimed that the new organisation had over a thousand members.

== Policies ==
In 1905 the IPLL campaigned on a policy of "Nationalisation of land and means of production and distribution". It also had ambitions to establish a state owned and operated bank, unemployment benefits, a legal 40-hour working week, a minimum wage and expanding government pensions to include widows and orphans.

== Electoral history ==
Socialist; Party (1901)	Independent; Political; Labour; League (1905)
(independents)	Labour Party (original) (1910)
United Labour; Party (1912)
Social Democratic; Party (1913)	(remnants)
Labour Party (1916)

Initially, the IPLL did not perform well. In the 1905 elections, the party stood 11 candidates: two in Auckland, four in Wellington, three in Christchurch, and one each in the Egmont and Invercargill electorates. None were elected, and all but one failed to win enough votes to reclaim their deposits. The party also failed in its attempts to recruit from among the more sympathetic Liberal MPs.

In the 1908 election, however, one IPLL candidate was elected in the Wellington East electorate on the second ballot. The Liberal vote was split by two Liberal Party candidates, and both Liberal candidates were eliminated in the first ballot. This left the IPLL candidate, David McLaren, face a conservative candidate and with many Liberal voters transferring their allegiance to McLaren, he won the second ballot. This was the first time that any organised political party other than the Liberals had won a seat; the conservative opposition was still disorganised. Legislative Councilor (and party member) Tom Paul put the IPLL's lack of success down to making the mistake of running candidates against Liberal members who were sympathetic to the Labour cause. He concluded that this had completely broken the earlier Liberal–Labour alliance which had given Labourers a voice in parliament in the past.

Election Results
Election	candidates	seats won	votes	percentage
1905	9	0	3,747	0.87%
1908	11	1	16,974	3.95%

The IPLL had more success in local government politics. Particularly in Wellington, the IPLL had many candidates elected as city councillors and harbour board members such as Frank Moore and Alfred Hindmarsh. IPLL MP David McLaren was later elected the Mayor of Wellington, serving from 1912 to 1913. IPLL candidates were successful in the 1905, 1907 and 1909 Wellington City Council elections.

== List of presidents ==
- John Rigg 1904
- Jim Munro 1905–06
- Alfred Hindmarsh 1906–07
- Jim Thorn 1907–08
- Dan Sullivan 1908

== Position in wider Labour politics ==
The IPLL itself, however, was increasingly failing. Internal disputes, such as whether the party should work with or against the Liberals, created tension, and the party was generally disorganised. In 1910, the remnants of the IPLL were relaunched as a new organisation, known as the Labour Party (not to be confused with the modern party of the same name). Eventually, this Labour Party joined with several independent groups to create the United Labour Party, which then merged with the Socialist Party to form the Social Democratic Party. The Social Democrats, along with various members of the United Labour Party who had rejected the previous merger, eventually formed the basis of the modern Labour Party.
