= New Zealand Labour Party (1910) =

- Founded: 1910
- Dissolved: 1912; 113 years ago
- Preceded by: Independent Political Labour League
- Succeeded by: United Labour Party
- Ideology: Democratic socialism
- Political position: Left-wing
- Colours: Red

The original New Zealand Labour Party was a short-lived left-wing political party in New Zealand. It is a predecessor of the modern Labour Party.

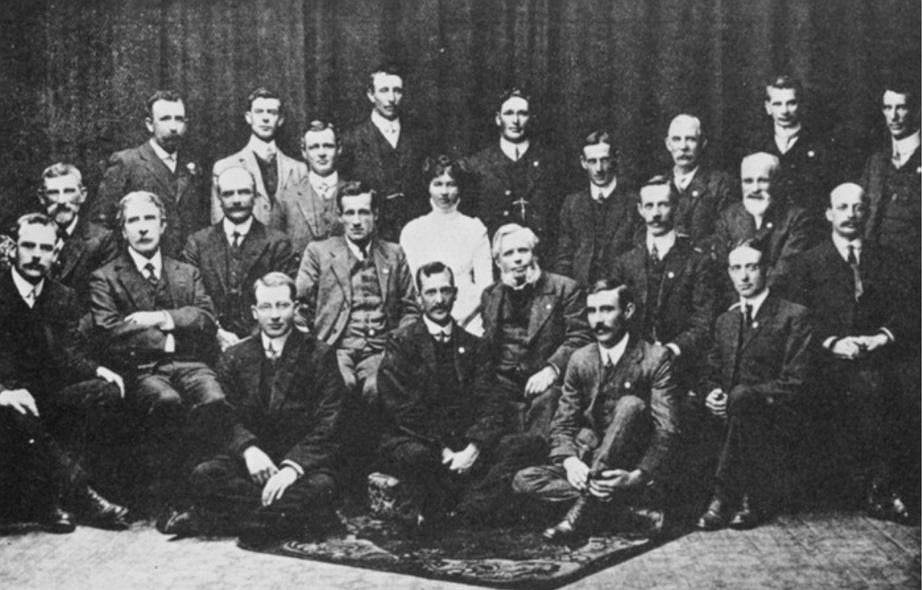
Labour Party annual conference, 1912.

The original Labour Party was founded in 1910. It was based on the remnants of the Independent Political Labour League, the first real working-class party in New Zealand, formed in 1904–05. While the IPLL had managed to elect one MP (David McLaren) to Parliament, it quickly began to collapse into disarray—internal disputes about the party's political alignment were a significant factor, as was poor organisation and coordination. The Labour Party was an attempt to relaunch the IPLL.

In the 1911 election, the Labour Party retained representation in Parliament through John Robertson, John Payne and chair Alfred Hindmarsh.

It did not, however, represent the totality of the left-wing vote — the Socialist Party and various independent candidates had also attracted a certain amount of support. In 1912, a "Unity Conference" was called, aiming to unite the diverse leftist factions. The Socialists refused to attend, but a number of independent activists agreed to take part in discussions. In the end, a new party, called the United Labour Party, was formed, consisting of the Labour Party and various independents such as Bill Veitch.

Later, the majority of the United Labour Party would merge with the Socialists to form the Social Democratic Party. This party would then merge with those elements of the United Labour Party which had remained independent, thereby forming the Labour Party which exists today.
