= David McLaren (politician) =

New Zealand politician

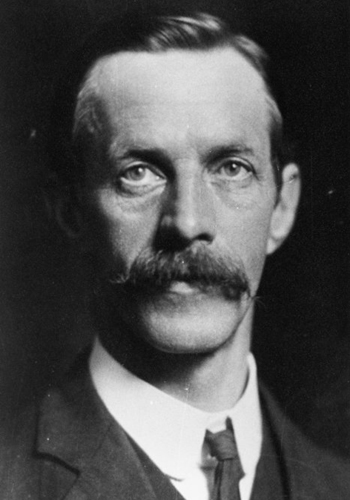
- David McLaren in 1912

19th Mayor of Wellington
- In office 1912–1913
- Preceded by: Thomas Wilford
- Succeeded by: John Luke

Member of the New Zealand Parliament for Wellington East
- In office 1908–1911
- Preceded by: John Aitken
- Succeeded by: Alfred Newman

Personal details
- Born: 1870 Glasgow, Scotland
- Died: 3 November 1939 (aged 68–69) Wellington, New Zealand
- Party: IPLL (1904–10); Labour (1910–12); United Labour (1912–16)

David McLaren (1872 – 3 November 1939) was a Mayor of Wellington and Member of Parliament in New Zealand.

== Early years ==
McLaren was born in Glasgow, Scotland and an operative in the boot trade. He enjoyed the poetry of Robert Burns and was member of the Burns Club.

On arriving in Wellington McLaren became involved in the Union movement seeking to improve the lot of lower paid workers. McLaren was Secretary of the Wellington Wharf Labourers Union in New Zealand. He was considered a moderate socialist.

He was a member of the Wellington City Council for 11 years from 1901 to 1912 and was elected Mayor of Wellington from 1912 to 1913. McLaren was also a member of the Hospital Board for 12 years. During World War I McLaren was appointed to the Military Service Board, and also served on the War Relief Association from its inception in 1914. At the end of the war he was appointed to the Influenza Epidemic Commission.

== Member of Parliament ==
New Zealand Parliament
Years	Term	Electorate	Party
1908–1910	17th	Wellington East	Ind. Labour League
1910–1911	Changed allegiance to:		Labour

McLaren was one of nine candidates who contested the three-member City of Wellington electorate in the 1902 election; he came last with 7% of the vote. In the 1908 election, McLaren stood in the Wellington East electorate for the Independent Political Labour League (IPLL). Two Liberal candidates received similar votes and both were eliminated in the first ballot. This left McLaren face a conservative candidate, Arthur Atkinson, in the second ballot, and with many liberal voters transferring their allegiance to McLaren, he became the only candidate of the IPLL who was ever elected to the House of Representatives. McLaren attended the Liberal Party's caucus, but maintained his independence in the house, voting both with and against them.

In 1911 he was defeated by the conservative candidate, Alfred Newman, by 65 votes. At the 1914 contest, McLaren was again unsuccessful, this time by 48 votes.

McLaren became estranged from the Labour Party during World War I. He was concerned about the rise of militant elements within the party. Later on, McLaren organised the wartime Welfare League and through this was associated with Edward Kellett.

He died on 3 November 1939 at Wellington Public Hospital. He was survived by his wife and daughter who were living in London.

== Notes ==
New Zealand Parliament
Preceded by John Aitken	Member of Parliament for Wellington East; 1908–1911	Succeeded by Alfred Newman
Political offices
Preceded by Thomas Wilford	Mayor of Wellington; 1912–1913	Succeeded by John Luke
