= Electoral history of Harry Holland =

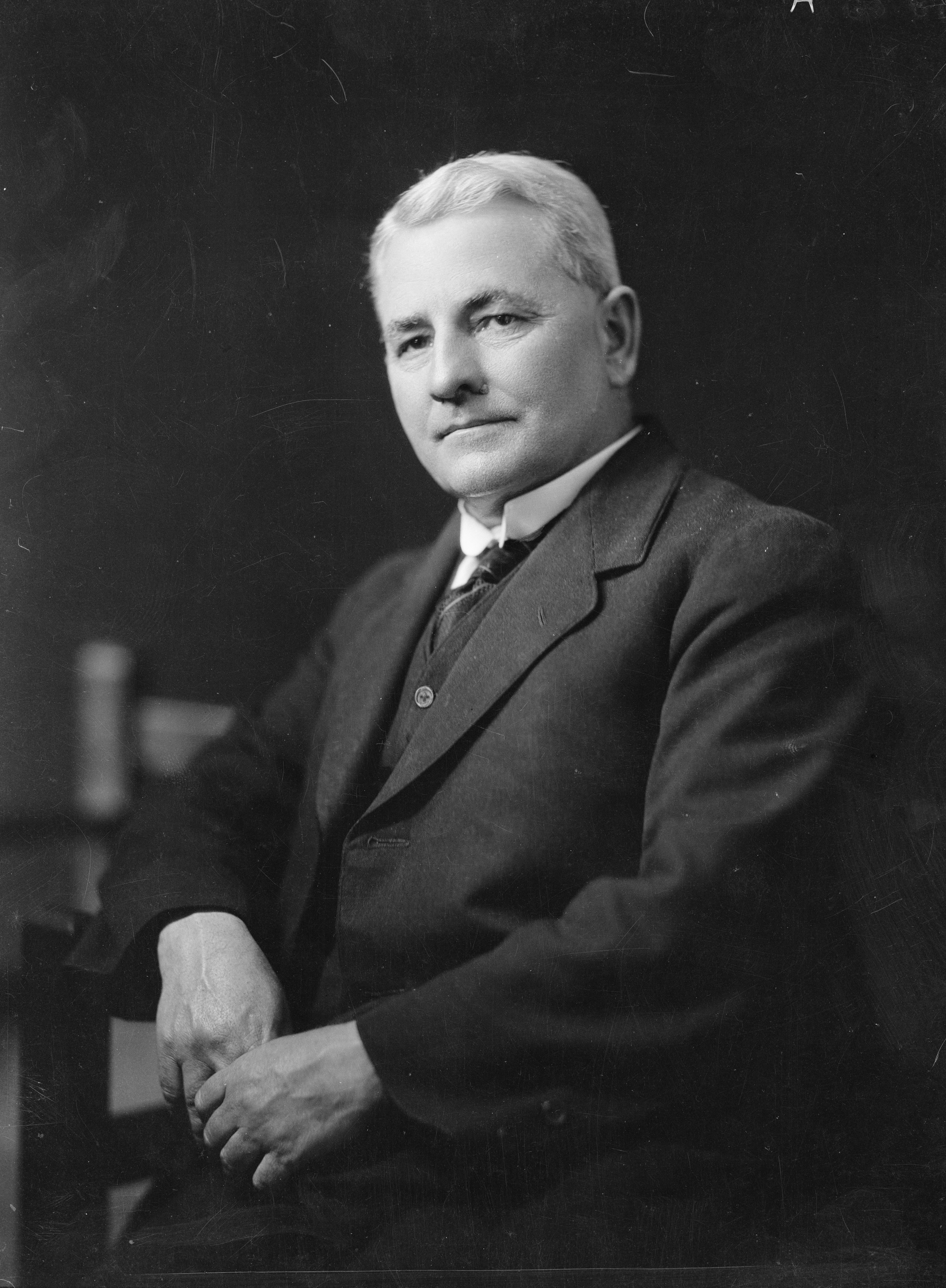
Harry Holland in 1922.

This is a summary of the electoral history of Harry Holland, Leader of the Opposition, (1926–28; 1931–33) Leader of the Labour Party (1919–33) and Member of parliament for Grey (1918–19) and Buller (1919–33).

== Parliamentary elections ==
=== New South Wales ===
==== 1901 election ====
1901 New South Wales state election: Sydney-Lang
Party	Candidate	Votes	%	±%
Labor	John Power	576	43.24	
Liberal Reform	Evan Jones	447	33.55	
Progressive	Joseph Chuck	259	19.44	
Socialist	Harry Holland	34	2.55	
Informal votes		16	1.20	
Majority		129	9.68	
Turnout		1,332		

==== 1907 election ====
1907 New South Wales state election: Darling Harbour
Party	Candidate	Votes	%	±%
Independent	John Norton	1,666	34.63	
Labor	William Daley	1,146	23.82	
Socialist	Harry Holland	746	15.50	
Liberal Reform	George Whatmore	650	13.51	
Independent	Evan Jones	435	9.04	
Independent	Sydney Green	6	0.12	
Majority		520	10.81	
Turnout		4,810	66.89	
Registered electors		8,038		

=== Australia ===
==== 1901 election ====
1901 Australian federal election: Senate, New South Wales
Party	Candidate	Votes	%	±%
Free Trade	James Walker	79,800	43.9	+43.9
Free Trade	Edward Millen	75,010	41.2	+41.2
Free Trade	Albert Gould	74,253	40.8	+40.8
Protectionist	Richard O'Connor	72,858	40.1	+40.1
Free Trade	John Neild	70,563	38.8	+38.8
Free Trade	Edward Pulsford	70,468	38.7	+38.7
Free Trade	John Gray	69,499	38.2	+38.2
Ind. Protectionist	John Norton	66,463	36.5	+36.5
Protectionist	Sir William Manning	48,110	26.4	+26.4
Protectionist	John Kidd	44,661	24.6	+24.6
Protectionist	Kenneth Mackay	41,596	22.9	+22.9
Ind. Protectionist	Richard Meagher	32,903	18.1	+18.1
Protectionist	George Waddell	32,729	18.0	+18.0
Protectionist	Mark Hammond	32,252	17.7	+17.7
Labour	Samuel Smith	31,185	17.1	+17.1
Labour	Donald Macdonell	30,416	16.7	+16.7
Ind. Protectionist	Eden George	20,136	11.1	+11.1
Ind. Free Trade	Edward Terry	18,764	10.3	+10.3
Ind. Free Trade	Harry Lassetter	17,741	9.8	+9.8
Ind. Protectionist	Harrie Wood	14,736	8.1	+8.1
Independent	Denis O'Sullivan	12,928	7.1	+7.1
Ind. Free Trade	George Cox	11,263	6.2	+6.2
Ind. Free Trade	Francis Cotton	9,170	5.0	+5.0
Independent	John Cook	7,422	4.1	+4.1
Ind. Free Trade	Charles Royle	7,216	4.0	+4.0
Ind. Free Trade	Francis Abigail	7,164	3.9	+3.9
Ind. Free Trade	John Griffin	6,502	3.6	+3.6
Socialist	John Neill	5,952	3.3	+3.3
Ind. Protectionist	William Read	5,836	3.2	+3.2
Socialist	Andrew Thomson	5,823	3.2	+3.2
Ind. Free Trade	Sam Rosa	5,560	3.1	+3.1
Ind. Protectionist	Richard Colonna-Close	5,147	2.8	+2.8
Socialist	Harry Holland	4,771	2.6	+2.6
Socialist	James Moroney	4,257	2.3	+2.3
Ind. Free Trade	Lindsay Thompson	4,005	2.2	+2.2
Ind. Protectionist	Patrick Lynch	3,876	2.1	+2.1
Ind. Protectionist	Walter Quinn	3,700	2.0	+2.0
Independent	Thomas Edwards	3,580	2.0	+2.0
Socialist	Thomas Melling	3,495	1.9	+1.9
Ind. Protectionist	David Fealy	3,411	1.9	+1.9
Ind. Protectionist	William Richardson	3,289	1.8	+1.8
Socialist	James Morrish	3,109	1.7	+1.7
Independent	Francis Brown	2,998	1.6	+1.6
Independent	John Blake	2,906	1.6	+1.6
Ind. Free Trade	William Shipway	2,776	1.5	+1.5
Independent	William Flynn	2,736	1.5	+1.5
Ind. Free Trade	Andrew Armstrong	2,348	1.3	+1.3
Ind. Free Trade	James Moriarty	2,366	1.3	+1.3
Independent	William Gocher	2,172	1.2	+1.2
Independent	David Gash	1,473	0.8	+0.8
Total formal votes		1,091,394; 181,899 valid ballots	82.5	
Informal votes		38,674	17.5	
Turnout		220,573	100.0	
Party total votes
Free Trade		439,593	40.3	+40.3
Protectionist		272,206	24.9	+24.9
Ind. Protectionist		153,688	14.1	+14.1
Ind. Free Trade		94,870	8.7	+8.7
Labour		61,601	5.6	+5.6
Independent		36,215	3.3	+3.3
Socialist		27,347	2.5	+2.5

==== 1910 election ====
1910 Australian federal election: West Sydney
Party	Candidate	Votes	%	±%
Labor	Billy Hughes	13,000	69.8	+14.3
Liberal	Stanley Cole	4,986	26.8	−17.7
Socialist	Harry Holland	628	3.4	
Informal votes		341	1.8	
Majority		8,014	42.27	
Turnout		18,955	60.7	

=== New Zealand ===
==== 1914 election ====
1914 general election: Wellington North
Party	Candidate	Votes	%	±%
Reform	Alexander Herdman	4,550	55.23	
Liberal	William Turnbull	1,895	23.00	
Social Democrat	Harry Holland	1,688	20.49	
Majority		2,655	32.23	
Informal votes		104	1.26	
Turnout		8,237	82.90	
Registered electors		9,936		

==== 1918 Wellington North by-election ====
1918 Wellington North by-election
Party	Candidate	Votes	%	±%
Reform	John Luke	2,986	41.89	
Labour	Harry Holland	2,566	35.99	+15.50
Liberal	Alfred Brandon	816	11.44	
Independent Liberal	Angus James Neville Polson	720	10.10	
Majority		420	5.89	
Informal votes		40	0.56	−0.70
Turnout		7,128		
Reform hold		Swing		

==== 1918 Grey by-election ====
1918 Grey by-election
Party	Candidate	Votes	%	±%
Labour	Harry Holland	2,865	50.90	
Reform	Thomas Coates	2,717	48.27	
Informal votes		46	0.81	
Majority		148	2.62	
Turnout		5,628		

==== 1919 election ====
1919 general election: Buller
Party	Candidate	Votes	%	±%
Labour	Harry Holland	3,545	57.70	
Liberal	Denis Quinlan O'Brien	2,542	41.38	
Informal votes		56	0.91	−0.45
Majority		1,003	16.32	
Turnout		6,143	93.11	+11.81
Registered electors		6,597		

==== 1922 election ====
1922 general election: Buller
Party	Candidate	Votes	%	±%
Labour	Harry Holland	4,413	59.80	+2.10
Reform	John Menzies	2,872	38.91	
Informal votes		94	1.27	+0.36
Majority		1,541	20.88	+4.56
Turnout		7,379	91.80	−1.31
Registered electors		8,038		

==== 1925 election ====
1925 general election: Buller
Party	Candidate	Votes	%	±%
Labour	Harry Holland	4,704	59.21	−0.59
Reform	Charles Beilby	3,172	39.92	
Informal votes		68	0.85	−0.45
Majority		1,532	19.28	−1.60
Turnout		7,944	93.92	+2.12
Registered electors		8,458		

==== 1928 election ====
1928 general election: Buller
Party	Candidate	Votes	%	±%
Labour	Harry Holland	5,988	70.33	+11.12
Reform	Dugald Macdonald Robertson	2,371	27.85	
Informal votes		154	1.80	+0.95
Majority		3,617	42.48	+23.20
Turnout		8,513	90.84	−3.08
Registered electors		9,371		

==== 1931 election ====
1931 general election: Buller
Party	Candidate	Votes	%	±%
Labour	Harry Holland	6,136	71.01	+0.78
Reform	John Menzies	2,505	28.99	
Informal votes		151	1.72	
Majority		3,631	42.02	−0.46
Turnout		8,792	89.02	−1.82
Registered electors		9,876		

== Leadership elections ==
=== 1919 leadership election ===
Name	Votes	Percentage
Harry Holland	3	50.0%
James McCombs	3	50.0%

=== 1920 leadership election ===
Name	Votes	Percentage
Harry Holland	5	62.5%
James McCombs	3	37.5%

=== 1921 leadership election ===
Name	Votes	Percentage
Harry Holland	5	71.42%
James McCombs	2	28.57%

=== 1922 leadership election ===
Name	Votes	Percentage
Harry Holland	6	66.66%
James McCombs	3	33.33%

=== 1923 leadership election ===
Name	Votes	Percentage
Harry Holland	14	82.35%
Dan Sullivan	3	17.65%
