= John Kempthorne =

John Kempthorne may refer to:

- John Kempthorne (hymnwriter) (1775–1838), English clergyman and hymnwriter
- John Kempthorne (Royal Navy officer) (1620–1679), officer in the English Royal Navy during the Second and Third Anglo-Dutch Wars
- John Kempthorne (bishop) (1864–1946), Anglican bishop of Hull, then Lichfield
- John Kempthorne (priest) (1849–1931), Anglican priest, Archdeacon of Waimea, New Zealand
