= Henry Michel =

New Zealand politician

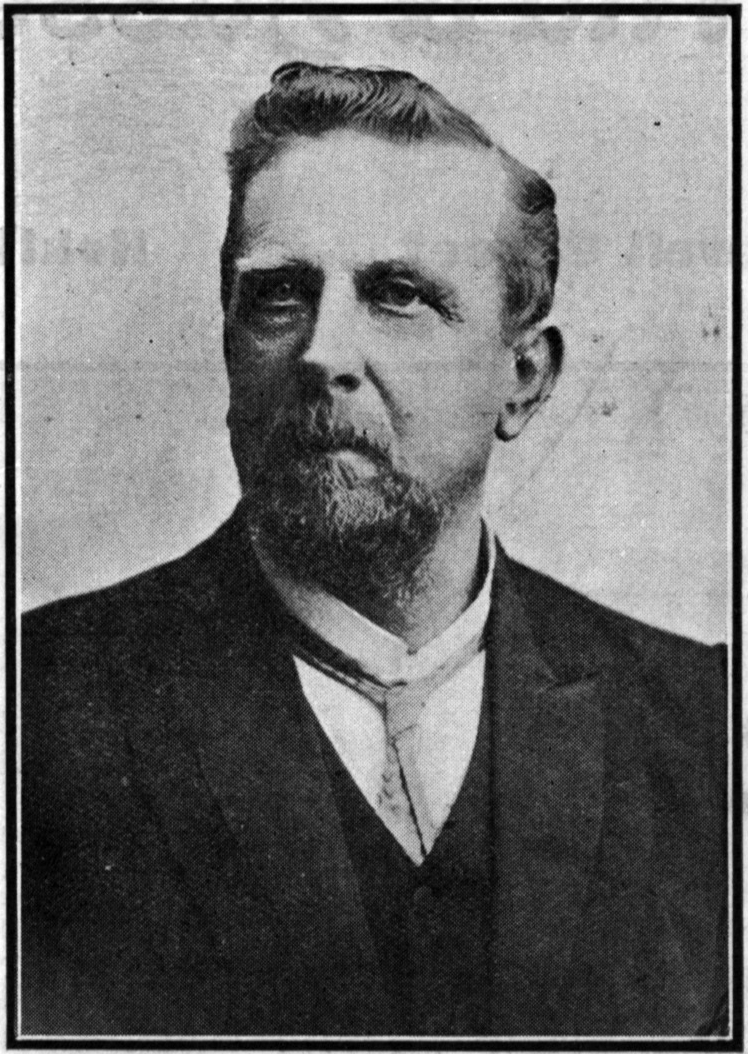
- Michel in 1913
- Born: 1855; Newcastle, Colony of New South Wales
- Died: 4 March 1930 (aged 74–75)

Henry Leslie Michel (1855 – 4 March 1930) was Mayor of Hokitika for several years, and served on the New Zealand Legislative Council from 1918 until his death. He had stood for the New Zealand Parliament on four occasions, in later years for the Reform Party, but was unsuccessful.

== Early life ==
Michel was born in Newcastle, New South Wales, and came to New Zealand as a boy. He settled in Hokitika and received his education at Scott's Academy. He joined the merchant firm of Paterson & Co, in which he became a partner (the firm then known as Paterson, Michel & Co) and later managing director.

== Public life ==
=== Hokitika ===
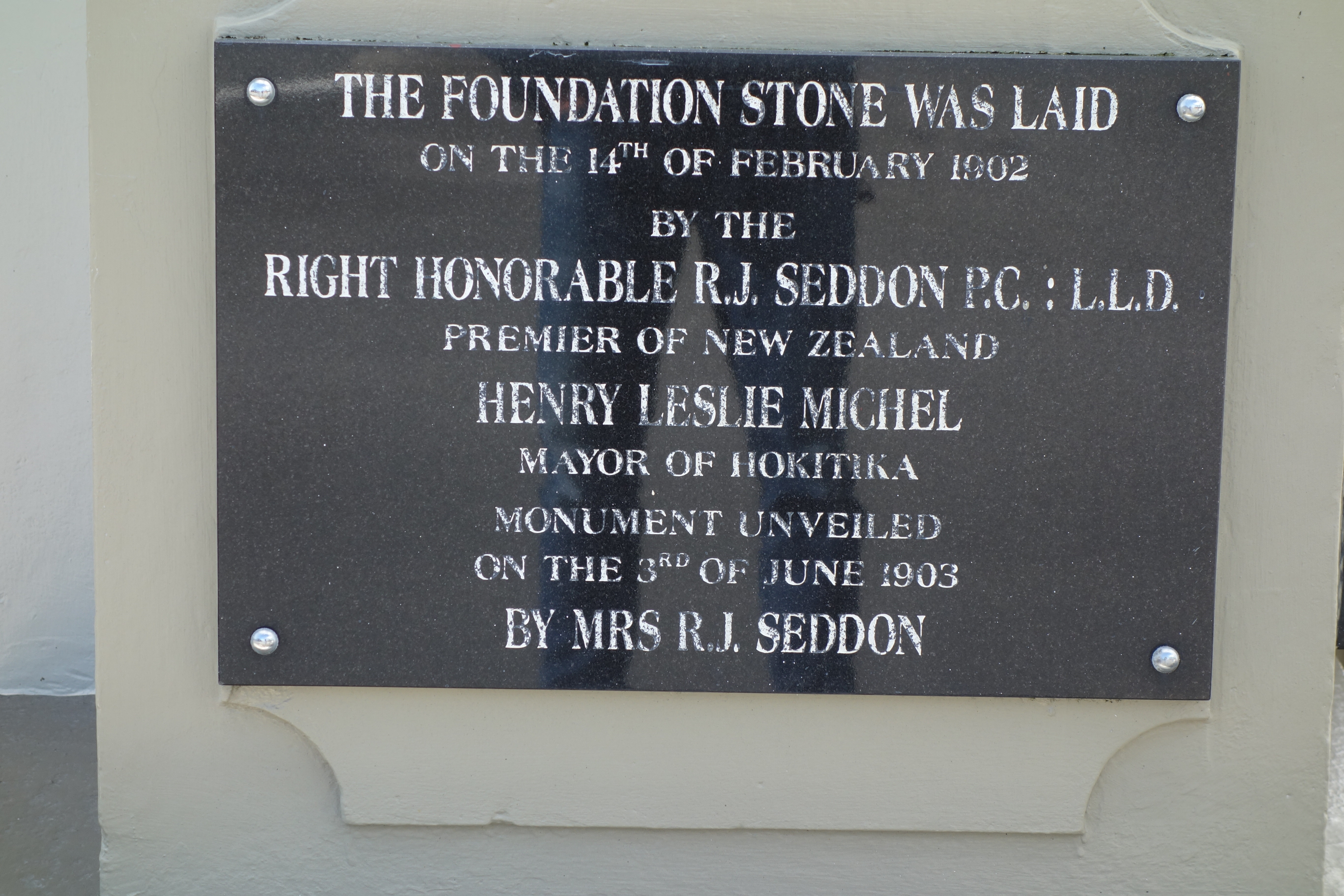
Plaque on the Hokitika Clock Tower

Michel was first elected to the Hokitika Borough Council in 1885. He was a member of the borough council for 25 years, and was Mayor of Hokitika for a total of 16 years spread over various periods starting in 1886. He served on various other local boards. Starting in 1900, he was the driving force behind the Hokitika Clock Tower; it was unveiled in June 1903.

=== National politics ===
Michel received a requisition to stand for Parliament in the 1887 election, but he declined.

Upon Richard Seddon's death, he contested the resulting 1906 by-election in the Westland electorate, but was defeated by Seddon's son Tom Seddon. He unsuccessfully stood against Seddon two more times, in 1908, and in 1911 for the Reform Party, when he was defeated in the first ballot. After the death of Sir Arthur Guinness, he contested the Grey electorate in the resulting 1913 by-election. Of three candidates, he came first in the first ballot. In the second ballot, the unsuccessful Liberal Party supported Paddy Webb of the Social Democratic Party, and Webb was elected.

Michel was a member of the Legislative Council from 7 May 1918 to 6 May 1925, and then from 7 May 1925 to 4 March 1930, when he died. He was appointed by the Reform Government.

He was buried in Hokitika Cemetery.

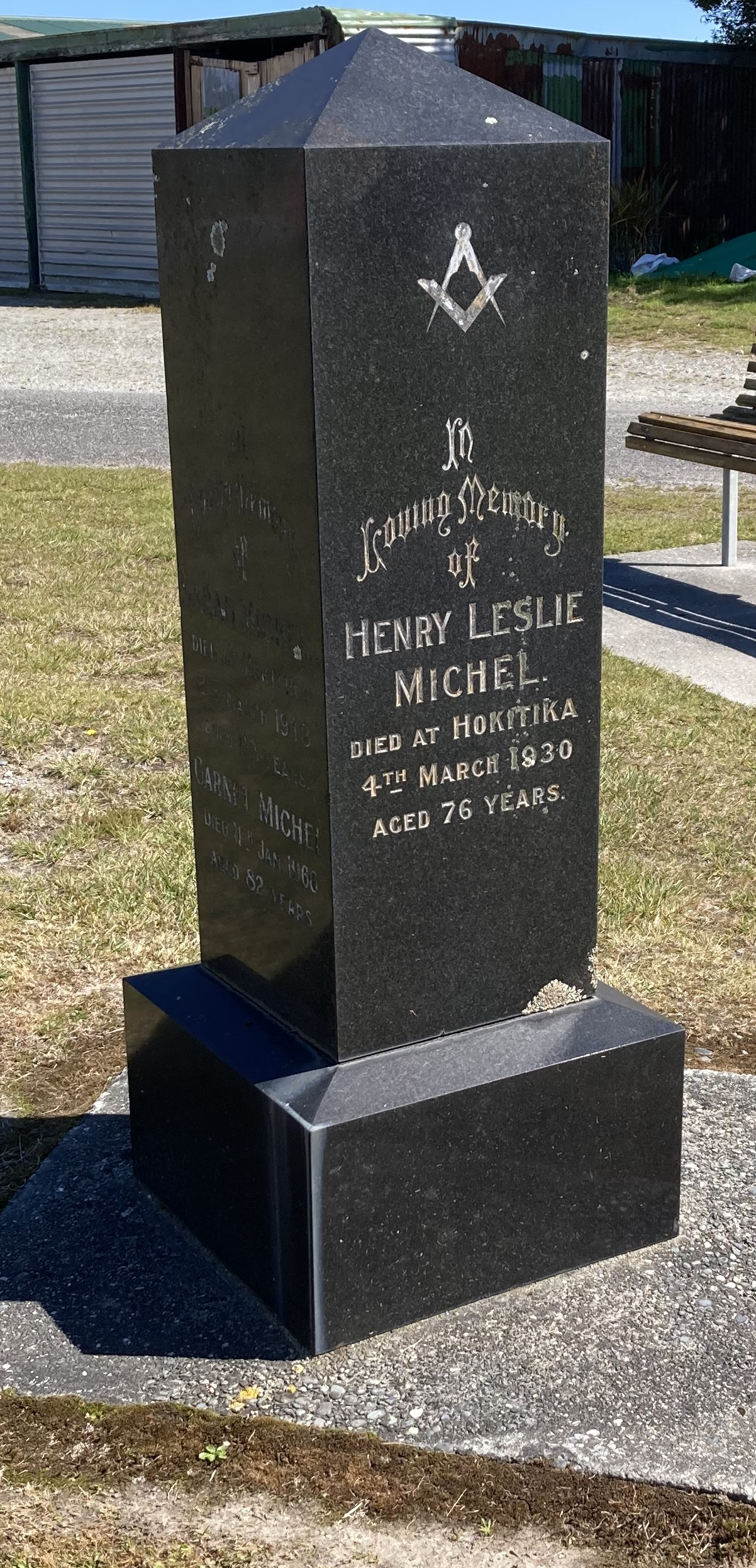
Michel's grave in Hokitika Cemetery
