= 1917 Grey by-election =

New Zealand by-election

- 24 December 1917
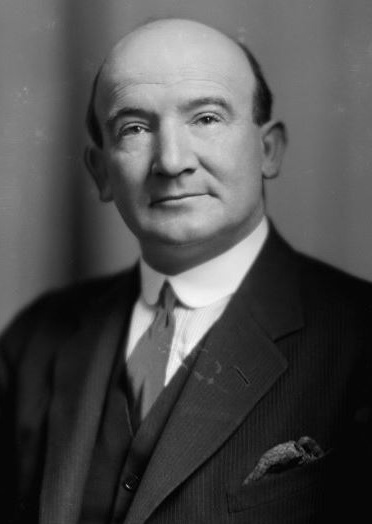
Candidate	Paddy Webb
Party	Labour
Popular vote	elected unopposed
Member before election
Paddy Webb
Labour
Elected Member
Paddy Webb
Labour

The Grey by-election of 1917 was a by-election held during the 18th New Zealand Parliament.

== Background ==
After the outbreak of World War I, Grey MP Paddy Webb became a leading critic of the Reform government of William Massey's policy of conscription, leading him to be briefly jailed for sedition in April 1917. In October the same year, Webb was called up for the military himself though he refused to co-operate. To back up his decision, he resigned from his seat in Parliament and challenged the government to fight a by-election on the issue in the hopes of gaining a public mandate for his decision. However, Massey's government declined, refusing to make the episode a public one. As a result, Webb was returned to his seat in Parliament unopposed.
