= 18th New Zealand Parliament =

Term of the Parliament of New Zealand

18th Parliament of New Zealand
←	17th Parliament	19th Parliament	→

Overview
- Legislative body: New Zealand Parliament
- Term: 15 February 1912 – 5 November 1914
- Election: 1911 New Zealand general election
- Government: Reform Government — Liberal Government until 10 July 1912

House of Representatives
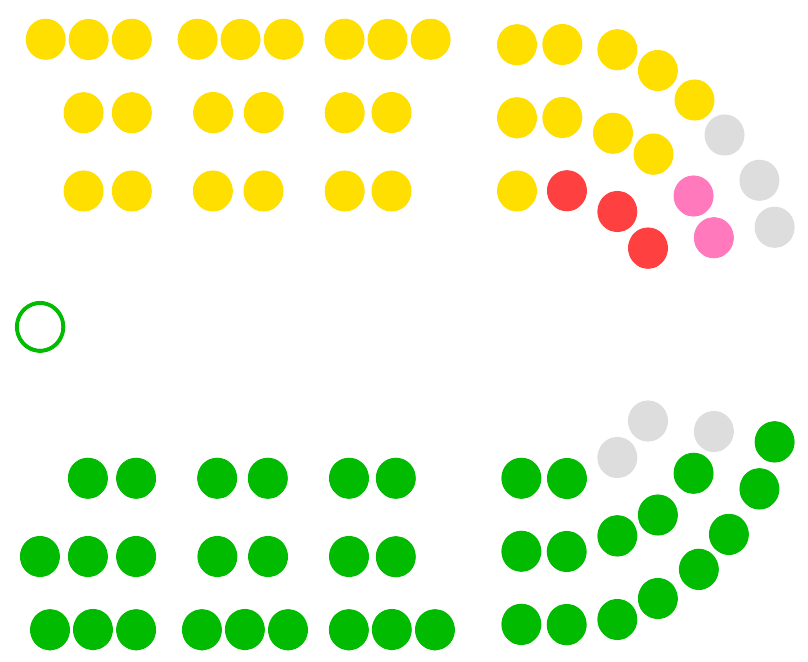
- Members: 80
- Speaker of the House: Frederic Lang — Arthur Guinness until 10 June 1913†
- Prime Minister: William Massey — Thomas Mackenzie until 10 July 1912; Joseph Ward until 12 March 1912
- Leader of the Opposition: Joseph Ward from 11 September 1913 — William Massey until 10 July 1912

Legislative Council
- Members: 37 (at start); 39 (at end)
- Speaker of the Council: Charles Bowen

Sovereign
- Monarch: HM George V
- Governor: HE Rt. Hon. The Earl of Liverpool

The 18th New Zealand Parliament was a term of the New Zealand Parliament. It was elected at the 1911 general election in December of that year.

== 1911 general election ==
The Second Ballot Act 1908 was used for the 1911 general election. The first ballot was held on Thursday, 7 December in the general electorates. The second ballots were held one week later on 14 December. The Second Ballot Act did not apply to the four Māori electorates and the election was held on Tuesday, 19 December. A total of 80 MPs were elected; 42 represented North Island electorates, 34 represented South Island electorates, and the remaining four represented Māori electorates. 590,042 voters were enrolled and the official turnout at the election was 83.5%.

== Sessions ==
The 18th Parliament sat for four sessions (there were two sessions in 1912), and was prorogued on 20 November 1914.

Session	Opened	Adjourned
first	15 February 1912	1 March 1912
second	27 June 1912	7 November 1912
third	26 June 1913	16 December 1913
fourth	25 June 1914	5 November 1914

== Party standings ==
=== Start of Parliament ===
Party	Leader(s)	Seats at start
Reform Party	William Massey	37
Liberal Party	Joseph Ward	33
Labour Party	Alfred Hindmarsh	4
Independents		6

=== End of Parliament ===
Party	Leader(s)	Seats at end
Reform Party	William Massey	38
Liberal Party	Joseph Ward	31
United Labour Party	Alfred Hindmarsh	3
Social Democrat Party	James McCombs	2
Independents		6

== Ministries ==
The Liberal Government of New Zealand had taken office on 24 January 1891. Joseph Ward formed the Ward Ministry on 6 August 1906. The Ward Ministry remained in power until Ward's resignation as Prime Minister in March 1912. The Liberal Party remained in power only on the casting vote of the Speaker, Arthur Guinness. The party selected Thomas Mackenzie as leader (and Prime Minister) and he formed the Mackenzie Ministry on 28 March 1912. In July 1912, Mackenzie lost a vote of no confidence, resigned as Prime Minister and handed over to William Massey of the Reform Party, bringing to an end the long reign of the Liberal Party. The Massey Ministry lasted for the remainder of the parliamentary term.

== Initial composition of the 18th Parliament ==
The following are the results of the 1911 general election:

Key

Reform	Liberal	Labour	Independent Liberal	Independent Labour
Socialist	Liberal–Labour	Independent	Affiliation unknown

Electorate results for the 1911 New Zealand general election
Electorate	Incumbent	Winner	Majority	Runner up
General electorates (Note: † in Majority column depicts electorates in which a second ballot was held.)
Ashburton	William Nosworthy		913†	John Kennedy
Auckland Central	Albert Glover		2,261	Michael Joseph Savage
Auckland East	Arthur Myers		1,993	Arthur Withy
Auckland West	Charles Poole	James Bradney	1,577	Charles Poole
Avon	George Warren Russell		271†	James McCombs
Awarua	Joseph Ward		628	John Hamilton
Bay of Islands	Vernon Reed		183	George Wilkinson
Bay of Plenty	William MacDonald		535	Harry De Lautour
Bruce	James Allen		675	Parker McKinlay
Buller	James Colvin		150	Fergus Ferguson Munro
Chalmers	Edward Henry Clark		326†	John Thomas Johnson
Christchurch East	Thomas Davey		1181†	Henry Thacker
Christchurch North	Leonard Isitt		749†	Dryden Hall
Christchurch South	Harry Ell		631	Gains Whiting
Clutha	Alexander Malcolm		375	George Livingstone
Dunedin Central	James Arnold	Charles Statham	1544	James Arnold
Dunedin North	George Thomson		759†	Robert Douglas
Dunedin South	Thomas Sidey		745	John McManus
Dunedin West	John A. Millar		639†	Harry Bedford
Eden	John Bollard		663	William Speight
Egmont	Bradshaw Dive	Thomas Mackenzie	327	Bradshaw Dive
Ellesmere	Heaton Rhodes		1581	George Armstrong
Franklin	William Massey		1963	John McLarin
Gisborne	James Carroll		Uncontested	
Grey	Arthur Guinness		1138	Paddy Webb
Grey Lynn	George Fowlds	John Payne	38†	George Fowlds
Hawke's Bay	Alfred Dillon	Hugh Campbell	1107†	Horace Simson
Hurunui	George Forbes		939	David Macfarlane
Hutt	Thomas Wilford		1931	Michael Reardon
Invercargill	Josiah Hanan		667†	Thomas Fleming
Kaiapoi	David Buddo		209†	Richard Moore
Kaipara	John Stallworthy	Gordon Coates	572†	John Stallworthy
Lyttelton	George Laurenson		2079	Colin Cook
Manukau	Frederic Lang		2307	Ralph Stewart
Marsden	Francis Mander		544	Edmund Purdie
Masterton	Alexander Hogg	George Sykes	581†	Alexander Hogg
Mataura	George Anderson		857	John MacGibbon
Motueka	Roderick McKenzie		1104	Frederick Smith
Napier	Vigor Brown		1064	Henry Hill
Nelson	John Graham	Harry Atmore	1516†	Walter Moffatt
Oamaru	Thomas Young Duncan	Ernest Lee	1364	Thomas Young Duncan
Ohinemuri	Hugh Poland		1207†	Pat Hickey
Oroua	David Guthrie		1092	Robert Hornblow
Otago Central	New electorate	Robert Scott	1810	William Mason
Otaki	William Hughes Field	John Robertson	21†	William Hughes Field
Pahiatua	Robert Ross	James Escott	573†	Robert Ross
Palmerston	David Buick		832	Robert McNab
Parnell	Frank Lawry	James Samuel Dickson	438†	John Findlay
Patea	George Pearce		960	Patrick O'Dea
Raglan	New electorate	Richard Bollard	919†	Allen Bell
Rangitikei	Robert William Smith	Edward Newman	1028	William Meldrum
Riccarton	George Witty		1373†	Charles Ensor
Selwyn	Charles Hardy	William Dickie	271	Charles Hardy
Stratford	John Hine		730	Joseph McCluggage
Taranaki	Henry Okey		754	Charles Bellringer
Taumarunui	William Thomas Jennings	Charles Wilson	125	William Thomas Jennings
Tauranga	William Herries		1941	Robert King
Temuka	New electorate	Thomas Buxton	1372	William Jeffries
Thames	Edmund Taylor	Thomas William Rhodes	66	Edmund Taylor
Timaru	James Craigie		1226	Joseph Moore
Waikato	Henry Greenslade	Alexander Young	1128	Henry Greenslade
Waimarino	New electorate	Robert William Smith	480†	Frank Hockly
Waipawa	Charles Hall	George Hunter	569	Albert Jull
Wairarapa	Walter Clarke Buchanan		125	J. T. Marryat Hornsby
Wairau	John Duncan	Richard McCallum	142†	John Duncan
Waitaki	William Steward	Francis Henry Smith	84†	John Macpherson
Waitemata	Leonard Phillips	James Samuel Dickson	407†	William Joseph Napier
Wakatipu	William Fraser		91	James Horn
Wallace	John Charles Thomson		1962	Alan Carmichael
Wanganui	James Thomas Hogan	Bill Veitch	1156†	James Thomas Hogan
Wellington East	David McLaren	Alfred Newman	65†	David McLaren
Wellington Central	Francis Fisher		131†	Robert Fletcher
Wellington North	Alexander Herdman		1807	Arnold Woolford Izard
Wellington South	Robert Wright	Alfred Hindmarsh	254†	Robert Wright
Wellington Suburbs and Country	John Luke	William Henry Dillon Bell	399	Frank Moore
Westland	Tom Seddon		271	Henry Michel
Māori electorates (Note: The affiliation of many of the Maori candidates is unknown or uncertain; note that the Second Ballot Act 1908 did not apply to Maori constituencies.)
Eastern Maori	Āpirana Ngata		Uncontested	
Northern Maori	Te Rangi Hīroa		405	Riapo Timoti Puhipi
Southern Maori	Tame Parata	Taare Parata	31	Hopere Uru
Western Maori	Henare Kaihau	Māui Pōmare	565	Henare Kaihau

Table footnotes:

== By-elections during 18th Parliament ==
There were a number of changes during the term of the 18th Parliament.

=== By-elections ===
Electorate and by-election		Date	Incumbent	Cause	Winner
Egmont	1912	17 September	Thomas Mackenzie	Resignation	Charles Wilkinson
Grey	1913	17 & 24 July	Arthur Guinness	Death	Paddy Webb
Lyttelton	1913	9 & 16 December	George Laurenson	Death	James McCombs

=== Party affiliation changes ===
Name	Year	Seat	From	To
Alfred Hindmarsh	1912	Wellington South	Labour	United Labour
John Payne	1912	Grey Lynn	Labour	Independent Labour
Bill Veitch	1912	Wanganui	Independent Labour	United Labour
