= Peter Egerton-Warburton =

English army major, police officer, and explorer in Australia

Colonel Peter Egerton-Warburton CMG FRGS
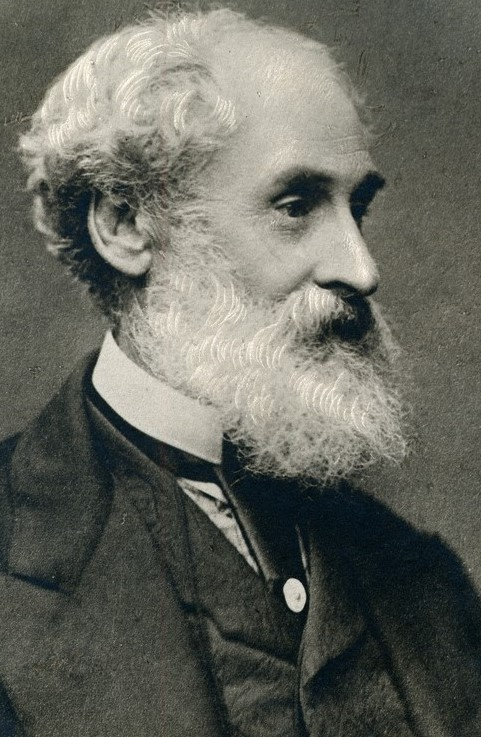
- Born: Peter Egerton; 16 August 1813; Arley Hall, Cheshire, England
- Died: 5 November 1889 (aged 76); Norley Bank, Beaumont, South Australia
- Resting place: St Matthew's Church, Kensington, South Australia
- Education: Private tutors, England and France (Orleans and Paris)
- Occupation: Commissioner of Police
- Years active: 1853–1867
- Employer: South Australia Police
- Organization: Colony of South Australia
- Spouse: Alicia Mant
- Parent: Revd Rowland Egerton-Warburton (father)
- Relatives: Rowland Egerton-Warburton (brother); Sir Philip Grey Egerton, 10th Baronet, FRS (cousin)
- Awards: CMG (1875)

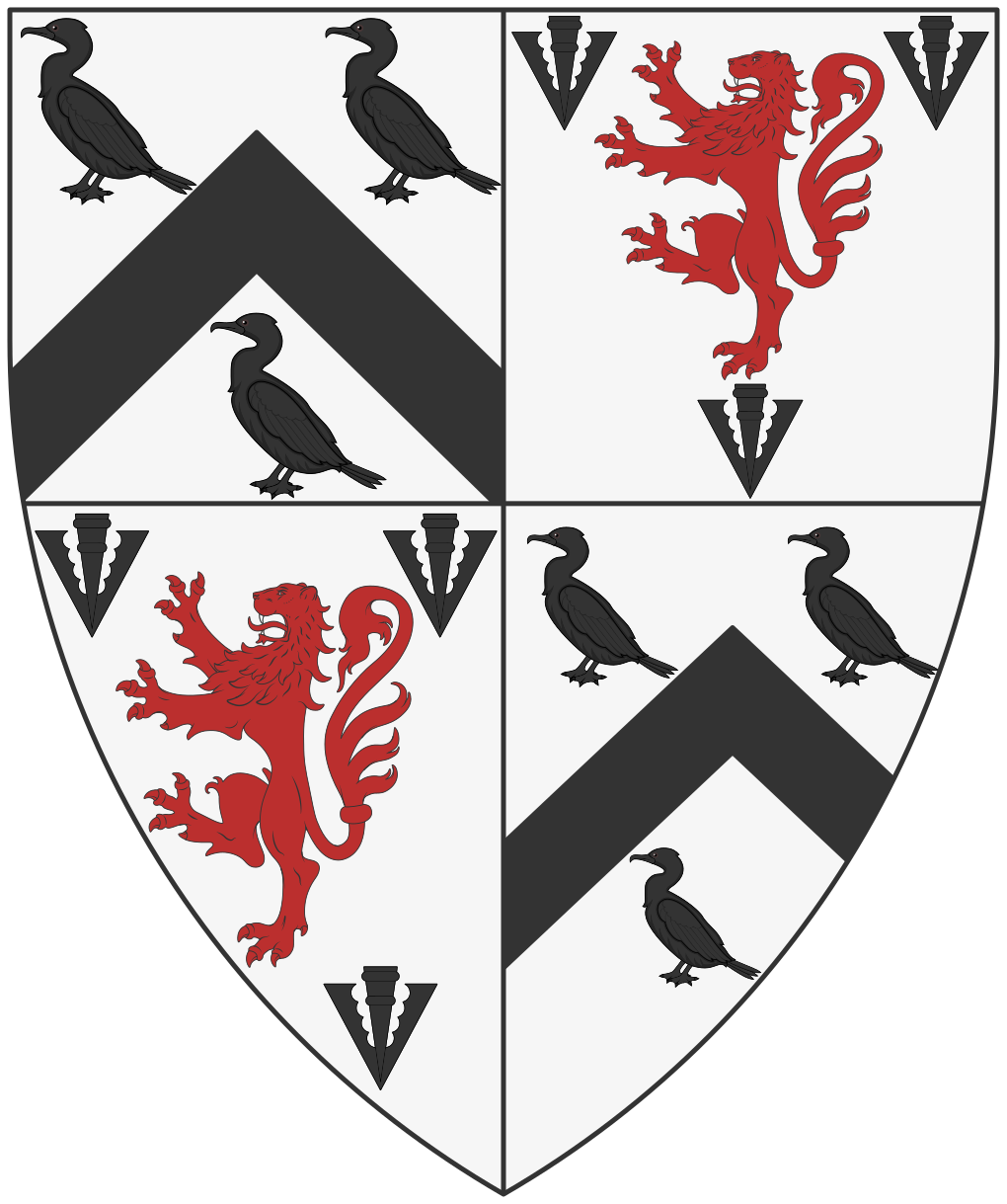
Egerton-Warburton arms

Colonel Peter Egerton-Warburton CMG FRGS (16 August 1813 – 5 November 1889), often referred to as Major Warburton, was a British military officer, Commissioner of Police for South Australia, and an Australian explorer. In 1872 he sealed his legacy through a particularly epic expedition from Adelaide crossing the arid centre of Australia to the coast of Western Australia via Alice Springs.

== Origins and early naval and military career ==
Peter Egerton was born into the aristocratic Egerton family on 16 August 1813 at Norley, Cheshire, England, the fourth son of the Revd Rowland Egerton BA. He was one of the younger brothers of the landowner and benefactor Rowland Egerton-Warburton, who inherited the family estates. He was educated at home in Cheshire and by tutors in France before being commissioned in the Royal Navy at the age of 12, serving as a Midshipman in HMS Windsor Castle.

He was then seconded to the Indian Army and served in India from 1831 until 1853, before retiring as Deputy Adjutant-General with the rank of Major.

Egerton married on 8 October 1838 Alicia (who died 1892), daughter of Henry Mant, a solicitor, however by the time of his arrival in Australia, he was known as Peter Egerton-Warburton. This came about because his father, who was in remainder to the Egerton baronetcy, assumed by Royal Licence the additional surname of Warburton in accordance with the terms of his wife's inheritance, viz. the Arley and Warburton estates.

== Commissioner of Police in South Australia ==
In 1853 Egerton-Warburton visited his brother George and his wife Augusta (daughter of Sir Richard Spencer), in Albany, Western Australia. George was a pioneer settler near Mount Barker and his sister-in-law, Eliza Grey, had married (Sir) George Grey, Governor of South Australia 1841–45 and New Zealand 1845–54. Through these connections, Egerton-Warburton continued to South Australia to take up the position of Commissioner of Police in the Colony of South Australia, effective 8 December 1853, replacing Alexander Tolmer, who was demoted to Superintendent.

Egerton-Warburton was Commissioner of Police for almost fourteen years. A considerable increase in government finances during this period allowed him to undertake morale-boosting reforms in numerous areas, including rank structures, uniforms, and establishing a policing presence into ever-expanding frontier districts. However he was also greatly excited by the opportunities for exploration in Australia, and because of this preoccupation his administration was somewhat disorganised. He was in 1856 the instrument of Governor MacDonnell's sacking of Superintendent of Police Tolmer, by all events a zealous and efficient officer, and the hero of the Gold Escort, while promoting less diligent but more sociable officers. A well-attended public meeting at Green's Exchange called for his reinstatement.

Following an internal police force inquiry in 1867, to which evidence was given against Egerton-Warburton but not disclosed, it was suggested that "... other employment in the Government Service, more congenial to his habits and tastes, should be found for him". Warburton's case divided the community. The allegations against him were never substantiated and he staunchly refused to resign. He was dismissed from his post early in 1867. A subsequent Legislative Council inquiry then recommended his reinstatement; however, on 24 March 1869, he accepted appointment as Chief Staff Officer and Colonel of the Volunteer Military Force of South Australia.

Based on expeditions undertaken, it appears that he was accused of allowing his passionate interest in exploration, which required long periods in isolation, to distract him from normal police duties. Warburton later received further honours in recognition of his groundbreaking exploration work, but not his police service.

== Exploration ==
=== Earlier expeditions ===
- In 1857 Warburton visited the Gawler Ranges and Lake Gairdner.
- In 1858 he travelled through the region of Lake Eyre and south Lake Torrens, during which he named the Davenport Range after Sir Samuel Davenport (a related ancient Cheshire family). The expedition found good grazing land and water sources and he was granted £100 from the government for the achievement.
- In January 1859, he reported that he and his group had found several freshwater springs near Mount Hamilton in northern South Australia, and had named "by far the finest batch of springs yet discovered" Finniss Springs, after B. T. Finniss.
- In 1860 he explored Streaky Bay with three mounted police, reporting that the area was unfavourable for farm use.
- In 1864 Warburton examined the area around the north-west of Mount Margaret.
- In 1866 he examined the area around the north shore of Lake Eyre searching unsuccessfully for Cooper Creek but found a large river which was subsequently named the Warburton River. He traced this to the Queensland border.

=== Expedition to the Western Australian coast (1872–1874) ===
On 21 September 1872, Warburton departed Adelaide, leading an expedition of seven men and seventeen camels (supplied by Sir Thomas Elder) with the aim of finding an overland route to Perth and determine the nature of the country in between. The expedition included his son Richard; J. W. Lewis, a well known and experienced bushman; two Afghan camel drivers, Sahleh and Halleem; Dennis White, the expedition cook and assistant camel man; and Charley, an Indigenous Australian tracker. The expedition arrived in Alice Springs in early 1873 before heading westward on 15 April 1873.

After 106 days of meandering through arid country, they pitched camp at a waterhole on the edge of the Great Sandy Desert and remained there for another 56 days. They endured long periods of extreme heat with little water and had to kill some of their camels for meat. Warburton's method of finding water was to capture an Aboriginal person and force them to lead the group to a waterhole. The captured aborigines were tied to trees to prevent them from escaping. Warburton described the capture of an old woman as:

"[we captured] a howling hideous old hag. We secured this witch by tying her thumbs behind her back and haltering her by the neck to a tree. She howled all night."

After finally crossing the Great Sandy Desert, they arrived at the Oakover River, 1,300 kilometres (800 miles) north of Perth with Warburton strapped to one of the two remaining camels and near death themselves. They were eventually brought to the De Grey station in a perilous condition. The men were all suffering from scurvy, and Warburton had lost his sight in one eye. They finally reached Roebourne on 26 January 1874 before returning to Adelaide by ship. Warburton received a grant of £1000 and his party received £500 from the South Australian Parliament for the expedition. All of the men recovered from their ordeal, with Warburton later attributing their survival to the bushcraft skills of Charley.

== Later life ==
Egerton-Warburton returned to England in 1874, but finding the climate not to his liking, returned to Australia after a stay of only six weeks, after receiving the Royal Geographical Society's Patron's Medal. In 1875 Warburton's account of the expedition, Journey across the Western Interior of Australia was published in London, and he was appointed CMG.

A son, Rowland James Egerton-Warburton (4 February 1846 – 1918) married Annie Hart (1852 – 1 December 1913) on 14 May 1872. Annie was a daughter of the Hon. John Hart CMG.

Partially blinded by the privations of exploration, his remaining years were spent at his estate, named Norley Bank, at Beaumont, near Adelaide, where he had a vineyard. He died 5 November 1889 at that estate and was buried in the churchyard at nearby St Matthew's Church, Kensington.

== Honours and works ==
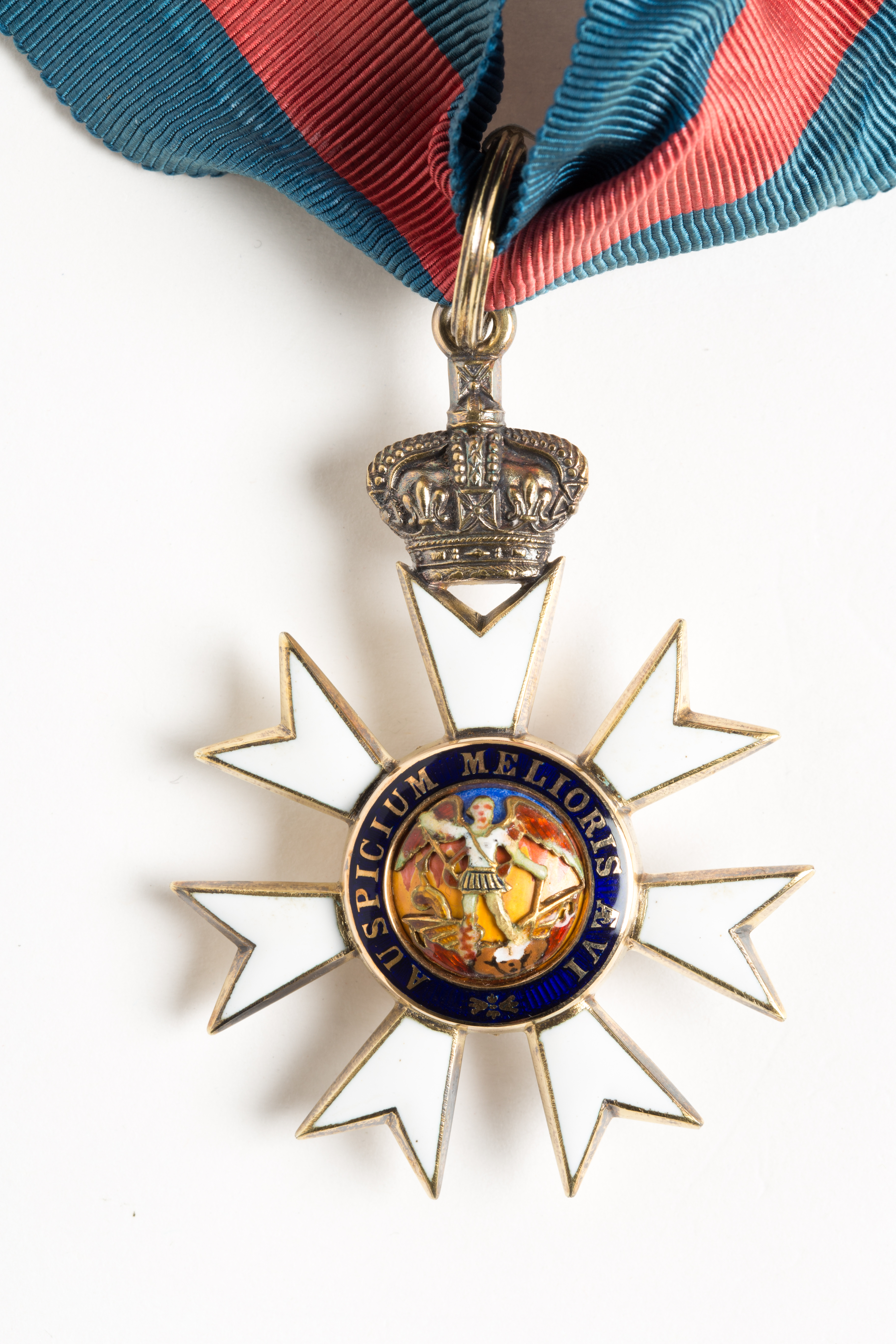
CMG insignia

The remote village of Warburton, Western Australia, two mountain ranges, the Warburton River, and a beetle (Warburton Beetle, Stigmodera Murrayi) are named after him and he was commemorated by an Australia Post stamp in June 1976, as one of a set of 6 Australian Explorers. Other honours include:

- Companion of the Order of St Michael and St George (1875)
- Fellow of the Royal Geographical Society (Patron's Medal, 1874)

Egerton-Warburton's published works include:

- Journey Across the Western Interior of Australia (1875)
- Major Warburton's Explorations in 1866
- Letter from Warburton re Exploration around Lake Torrens (1858).

== See also ==
- Egerton family
- History of Western Australia

== Sources ==
- www.burkespeerage.com
- "Crossing West Australia". Archived from the original on 1 September 2012.
- Serle, Percival (1949). "Warburton, Peter". Dictionary of Australian Biography. Sydney: Angus & Robertson.
