= Shadow Cabinet of Harry Holland =

New Zealand political leader Harry Holland assembled a spokesperson system amongst the Labour caucus following his elevation to become Leader of the Opposition on 16 June 1926, when Labour won the 1926 Eden by-election. As the Labour Party formed the largest party not in government, his frontbench team was as a result the Official Opposition of the New Zealand House of Representatives.

Holland once again became Leader of the Opposition in 1931 after his agreement to give confidence in the house to the United Party government ended. He remained leader until his death in 1933.

== Frontbench team ==
The list below contains a list of Holland's spokespeople and their respective roles:

=== 1926–28 ===
Shadow Minister	Portfolio
Harry Holland	Leader of the Opposition; Spokesperson for Foreign Affairs
Michael Joseph Savage	Deputy Leader of the Opposition; Spokesperson for Internal Affairs; Spokesperson for Native Affairs; Accossiate spokesperson for Finance
Peter Fraser	Spokesperson for Education; Spokesperson for Health; Parliamentary Caucus Secretary
James McCombs	Spokesperson for Finance
Bob Semple	Spokesperson for Labour; Spokesperson for Mines
Dan Sullivan	Senior Whip
Rex Mason	Spokesperson for Justice
Ted Howard	Junior Whip

=== 1931–33 ===
Shadow Minister	Portfolio
Harry Holland	Leader of the Opposition; Spokesperson for Foreign Affairs
Michael Joseph Savage	Deputy Leader of the Opposition; Spokesperson for Internal Affairs; Spokesperson for Native Affairs
Peter Fraser	Spokesperson for Education; Spokesperson for Health; Parliamentary Caucus Secretary
Walter Nash	Spokesperson for Finance
Bob Semple	Spokesperson for Labour; Spokesperson for Mines
Dan Sullivan	Senior Whip
Rex Mason	Spokesperson for Justice
Ted Howard	Junior Whip
