= Patrick O'Farrell =

Australian historian

- Born: Patrick James O'Farrell; 17 September 1933; Greymouth, New Zealand
- Died: 25 December 2003 (aged 70)
- Spouse: Deirdre Genevieve MacShane (m. 1956)
- Children: 5

Academic background
- Education: Australian National University
- Thesis: H.E. Holland and the labour movement in Australia and New Zealand: with special emphasis on the activity of militant socialists (1960)

Academic work
- Discipline: History
- Institutions: University of New South Wales
- Main interests: Labour history Irish history Catholic Church in Australia

Patrick James O'Farrell (17 September 1933 – 25 December 2003) was a historian known for his histories of Roman Catholicism in Australia, Irish history and Irish Australian history.

== Early life and family ==
O'Farrell was born on 17 September 1933, in Greymouth, New Zealand, into an Irish Catholic family. He was educated at the Marist Brothers High School, Greymouth, and at Canterbury University College, where he graduated Master of Arts with second-class honours in history in 1956.

Having moved to Australia in 1956, O'Farrell earned a PhD from the Australian National University in 1960 on the development of Harry Holland, an early Labour Party leader in New Zealand, as a militant socialist.

On 29 December 1956, O'Farrell married Deirdre Genevieve MacShane, and the couple went on to have five children.

== Academic career ==
O'Farrell was appointed as a lecturer in history at the University of New South Wales in 1959, rising to become a professor in 1972. On his retirement in 1990, he was conferred with the title of professor emeritus.

O'Farrell's first research interests were in Labour history with the 1964 publication of a work on Harry Holland. The appearance in 1968 of his book The Catholic Church in Australia led to his recognition as the leading historian of the Catholic Church and community in Australia. He subsequently also became well known for his major contributions to the writing of Irish history and of Irish Australian history. As an opponent of social history 'from below', he initiated a polemic against oral history in the 1980s.

== Bibliography ==
- Harry Holland: Militant Socialist (1964)
- The Catholic Church in Australia: A Short History 1788-1967 (1968)
- Documents in Australian Catholic History 1788-1968 (1969)
- Ireland’s English Question: Anglo-Irish Relations 1534-1970 (1971)
- England and Ireland since 1800 (1975)
- O'Farrell, Patrick (1977). The Catholic church and community in Australia : a history. West Melbourne: Thomas Nelson (Australia).
  - — (1985). The Catholic Church and community : an Australian history. Kensington, NSW: New South Wales University Press.
  - — (1992). The Catholic Church and community : an Australian history (3rd rev. ed.). Kensington, NSW: New South Wales University Press.
- Letters from Irish Australia 1825-1929 (1984)
- O'Farrell, Patrick (1986). The Irish in Australia. Kensington, NSW: New South Wales University Press.
  - — (1993). The Irish in Australia (Revised ed.). Kensington, NSW: New South Wales University Press.
  - — (2000). The Irish in Australia : 1788 to present (3rd ed.). Kensington, NSW: UNSW Press.
- — (1990). Vanished kingdoms : Irish in Australia and New Zealand. Kensington, NSW: UNSW Press.
- Through Irish Eyes: Australian and New Zealand Images of the Irish 1788-1948 (1994)
- UNSW: a Portrait (1999)
