= Tim Harris (Anglican bishop) =

Australian Anglican bishop

The Right Reverend Tim Harris
- Assistant bishop, Anglican Diocese of Adelaide
- Church: Anglican Church of Australia
- Diocese: Adelaide
- Installed: 20 November 2011

Orders
- Consecration: 20 November 2011 by Jeffrey Driver

Personal details
- Denomination: Anglican
- Spouse: Fiona
- Children: 1 son
- Education: Flinders University (PhD); Australian College of Theology (MTh, BTh (Hons.)); Macquarie University (BA); Moore Theological College (Dip. Arts)

Tim Harris is an Australian bishop in the Anglican Church of Australia. He has served as an assistant bishop in the Anglican Diocese of Adelaide, as the Bishop for Mission and Evangelism, since November 2011.

Harris has been involved in parish ministry since 1985, but moved to Adelaide in 1995, and spent 13 years as rector of St Matthew's Kensington and as Archdeacon for 18 months, before moving to Nelson, New Zealand, for three and a half years to serve as Dean of Bishopdale College, and later as Archdeacon for Theological Education and Ministry Formation in the Anglican Diocese of Nelson. While Harris was in both roles, parish numbers in the respective areas increased by 90%.

In 2011 Harris moved back to Adelaide to take up the appointment as Bishop and was consecrated on 20 November 2011. The major focus of his role is on encouraging and developing ‘mission and evangelism’ within the Diocese, alongside some teaching at St Barnabas College.

Harris is married to Fiona and has 1 son.
