= George York (priest) =

New Zealand Anglican priest (1858–1944)

The Venerable George York
- Archdeacon of Marlborough
- In office: 1919–1930
- Other posts: Archdeacon of Māwhera (1903–1919)

Orders
- Ordination: 1885 (deacon); 1887 (priest)

Personal details
- Born: George William York; 13 December 1858 Nelson, New Zealand
- Died: 11 October 1944 (aged 85) Stoke, New Zealand
- Denomination: Anglicanism
- Spouse: Lillian Petrie (m. 1900; died 1923)
- Relatives: Joseph Petrie (father-in-law)

George William York (13 December 1858 – 11 October 1944) was a New Zealand Anglican priest from the 1880s onwards.

== Early life and family ==
He was born in Nelson in 1858, the son of builder and late farmer Thomas York Bishopdale, and Emma York (née Edwards).

He married Lillian Petrie, daughter of Joseph Petrie, at the Holy Trinity Church, Greymouth, on 7 February 1900. Lillian York held a diploma as an Associate of tahe Royal College of Music, London, and was the organist at Holy Trinity, Greymouth.

== Career ==
York was educated at Bishopdale College; and ordained deacon in 1885, and priest in 1887. After curacies in Lyell, Brunnerton and Dunedin, he held incumbencies at Greymouth, Māwhera and Marlborough. He was archdeacon of Māwhera from 1903 until 1919; and archdeacon of Marlborough from 1919 to 1930.

== Later life and death ==
Following his retirement, York moved to Riccarton, where his assisted his brother, Reverend Herbert York, for nine years, before going to live in Nelson.

York died in at his sister's residence in Stoke on 11 October 1944, aged 85, and was buried at Omaka Cemetery, Blenheim, alongside his wife, who had died in 1923. A memorial service was held at St Peter's Church, Upper Riccarton, on 22 October.
