= Frank Guinness =

New Zealand police officer (1820–1891)

- Born: c. 1820; Dublin, Ireland
- Died: 18 September 1891 (aged 70–71); Dublin, Ireland
- Occupations: officer, magistrate and labour organiser
- Family: Guinness

Francis Hart Vicesimus Guinness (c. 1820 – 18 September 1891) was a New Zealand police officer, magistrate and labour organiser. He was born in Dublin, Ireland. A member of the Guinness family, he was the father of politician Arthur Guinness.
