= St Matthew's Church, Marryatville =

St Matthew's Church
- An exterior view of the church
- St Matthew's Church
- 34°55′37″S 138°38′40″E
- Location: 146 Kensington Road, Marryatville, South Australia
- Denomination: Anglican Church of Australia
- Website: www.stmatts.asn.au

History
- Consecrated: 21 September 1849

St Matthew's Church is a heritage listed Anglican church in Marryatville, an inner eastern suburb of Adelaide, South Australia. It was established in 1848 and consecrated in 1849. It is adjacent to Marryatville High School.

== History ==
The land for the church was donated in 1848 by the South Australia Company, who received it from George Brunskill. The church was consecrated on 21 September 1849.

Percy Grainger's parents, architect John Harry Grainger and Rose Annie Aldridge, daughter of a local hotel-keeper, were married in St Matthew's in 1880, and Percy's funeral was conducted there after his body was flown back from the United States in 1961.

The church was listed on the now-defunct Register of the National Estate on 21 March 1978.

=== Grace Anglican Network ===
St Matthew's was as of 2021 part of the Grace Anglican Network, together with St Bartholomew's Church in Norwood (St Bart's Norwood). The network was created in 2002. The church communities described themselves as "gospel-centred" and evangelical in theological stance. As of February 2022, "St Bart's Norwood" makes no mention of St Matthew's on its website, but says it is transitioning to a new ministry team.

== Rectors ==
- Mathew Hale
- Tim Harris
- Kevin Giles, a well-known contributor to discussions about gender roles and the Trinity, including subordinationism.

== Cemetery ==
Notable South Australians buried on the grounds of St Matthew's include:

- Colonel Peter Edgerton Warburton, noted South Australian explorer and police commissioner, who died in 1889. His eldest daughter married the only son of Augustus Short, the first Anglican bishop of Adelaide.
- Baroness von Oertzen, born Matilda Goulding, 1 January 1840, in Marlborough, Wiltshire, died 27 April 1864, in South Australia, ancestor of Baron Klaus von Oertzen.
