= Arthur Guinness (New Zealand politician) =

New Zealand politician

The Honourable Sir Arthur Guinness
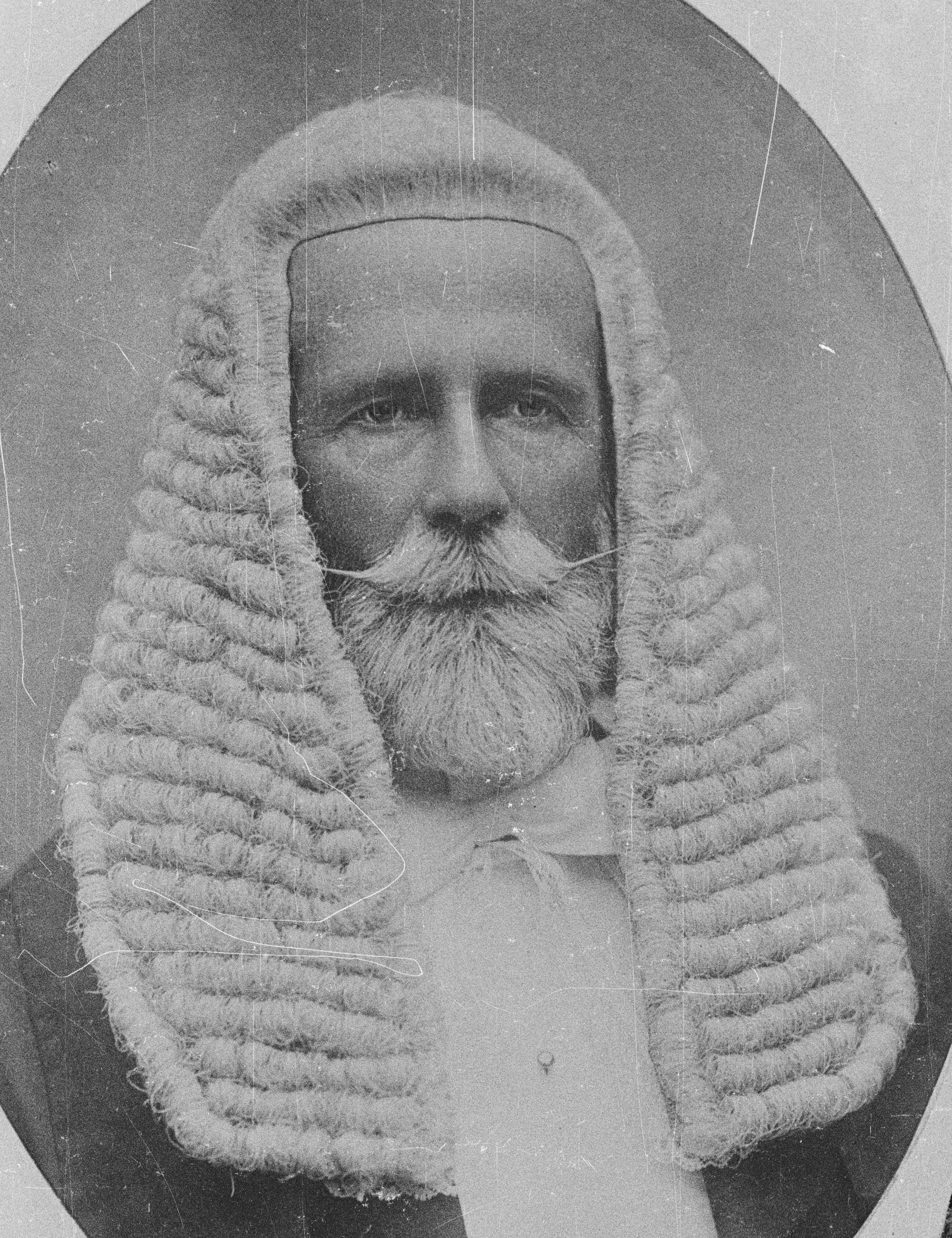
- Arthur Guinness in the 1900s

7th Speaker of the House of Representatives
- In office 29 June 1903 – 10 June 1913
- Prime Minister: Richard Seddon; William Hall-Jones; Joseph Ward; Thomas Mackenzie; William Massey
- Preceded by: Maurice O'Rorke
- Succeeded by: Frederic Lang

Member of the New Zealand Parliament for Grey Greymouth (1884–1890)
- In office 22 July 1884 – 10 June 1913
- Preceded by: Joseph Petrie
- Succeeded by: Paddy Webb

Personal details
- Born: 11 January 1846 Calcutta, India
- Died: 10 June 1913 (aged 67)
- Party: Liberal
- Father: Frank Guinness

Sir Arthur Robert Guinness (11 January 1846 – 10 June 1913) was a New Zealand politician, and Speaker of the House of Representatives.

== Personal information ==
He was born in Calcutta, India, son of Frank Guinness, who arrived at Lyttelton by the ship Tory in August 1852. He was educated at Christ's College, Christchurch 1854–1859 (being no. 31 on the list). He received his legal education from Edward Harston and then from Garrick and Cowlishaw, before being admitted to the bar in 1867. He then practised as a barrister and solicitor in Greymouth, where he served on the Westland Provincial Council from 1874 to 1876, and was then a member of the Grey County Council from 1876 to 1890, including nine as its chair.

== Member of Parliament ==
New Zealand Parliament
Years	Term	Electorate	Party
1884–1887	9th	Greymouth	Independent
1887–1890	10th	Greymouth	Independent
1890–1893	11th	Grey	Liberal
1893–1896	12th	Grey	Liberal
1896–1899	13th	Grey	Liberal
1899–1902	14th	Grey	Liberal
1902–1905	15th	Grey	Liberal
1905–1908	16th	Grey	Liberal
1908–1911	17th	Grey	Liberal
1911–1913	18th	Grey	Liberal

Guinness first stood for two-member Grey Valley in the 1876 election and out of the four candidates, he came last. In his second attempt in 1884, he defeated the incumbent, Joseph Petrie, in the single-member electorate that was by now called Greymouth. He remained a member of the House of Representatives for Greymouth until 1890, and then represented the Grey electorate until his death in 1913. He belonged to the Liberal Party.

He was Chairman of Committees from 1893 to 1902, then the 7th Speaker of the House of Representatives from 1903 until his death in 1913. Upon the death of William Steward on 30 October 1912, he became Father of the House. When he died, his replacement from the Grey by-election was Paddy Webb, who was elected on the second ballot with Liberal support.

== Family ==
Arms granted to Guinness's grandfather Hosea Guinness in 1814

In 1875, Guinness married Elisabeth Westbrook, daughter of Mr James Westbrook of Launceston. He was knighted in the 1911 Coronation Honours. Guinness died on 10 June 1913 and is buried at Greymouth Cemetery.

He was a great-grandson of his namesake the Dublin brewer Arthur Guinness (1725–1803).

== Notes ==
Political offices
Preceded by William Lee Rees	Chairman of Committees of the House of Representatives; 1893–1902	Succeeded by John A. Millar
Preceded by Maurice O'Rorke	Speaker of the New Zealand House of Representatives; 1903–1913	Succeeded by Frederic Lang
New Zealand Parliament
Preceded by Joseph Petrie	Member of Parliament for Greymouth; 1884–1890	Constituency abolished
New constituency	Member of Parliament for Grey; 1890–1913	Succeeded by Paddy Webb
