= Joseph Petrie =

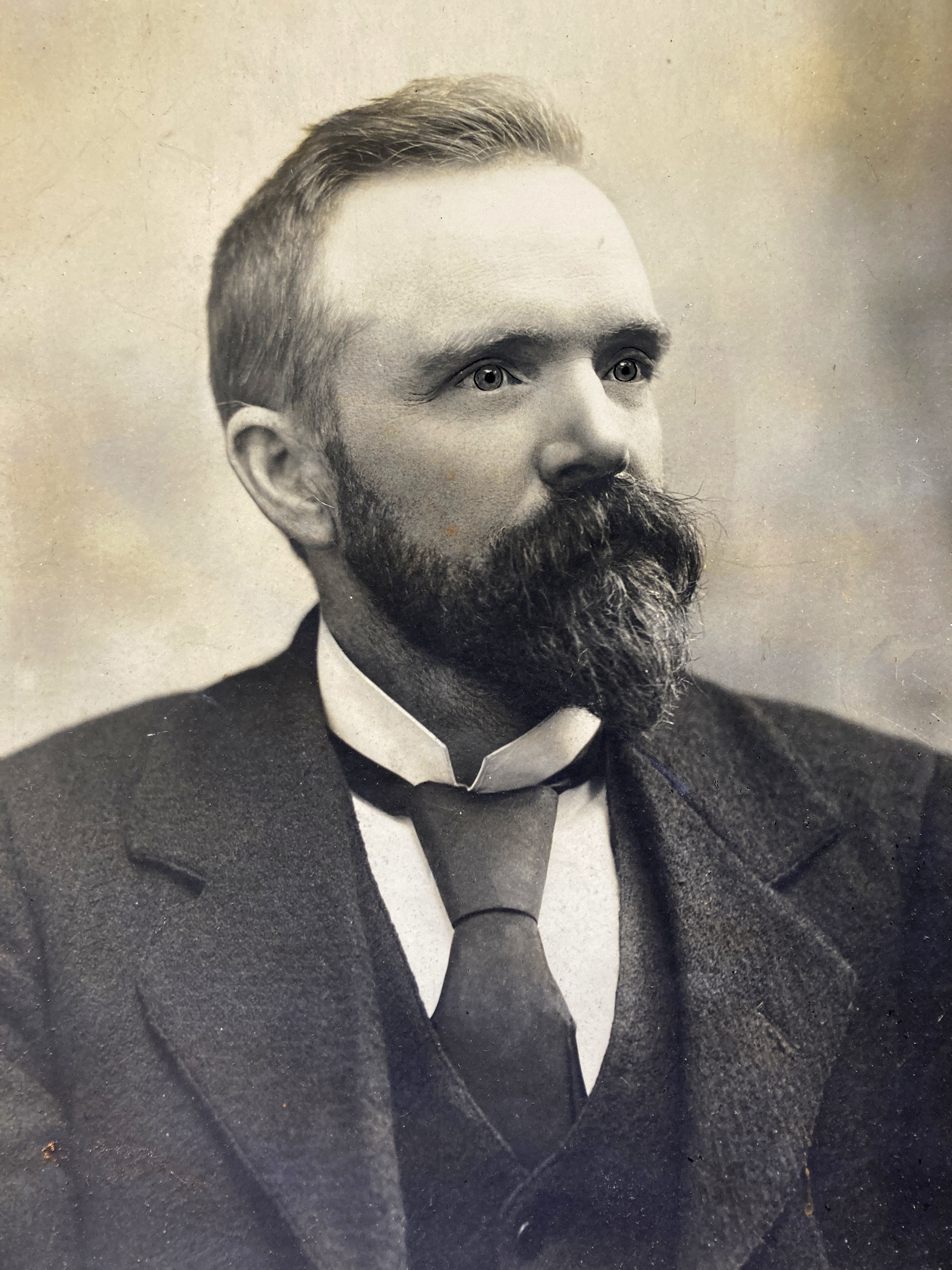

Member of the New Zealand Parliament for Greymouth
- In office 1881–1884
- Preceded by: New constituency
- Succeeded by: Arthur Guinness

12th Mayor of Greymouth
- In office 1887–1888
- Preceded by: Richard Nancarrow
- Succeeded by: John Mitchell
- In office 1907–1908
- Preceded by: James Andrew Petrie
- Succeeded by: Thomas Eldon Coates

Personal details
- Born: 1848 Aberdeenshire, Scotland
- Died: 4 May 1908 (aged 59) Wellington, New Zealand
- Spouse: Eliza Creer
- Relatives: George York (son-in-law)
- Occupation: Journalist, newspaper editor

Joseph Petrie (1848 – 4 May 1908) was a 19th-century Member of Parliament from Westland, New Zealand.

== Early life ==
Petrie was born in Aberdeenshire, Scotland in 1848, and arrived in New Zealand by the ship Silistria in 1860. Petrie went to the Otago goldfields, and visited Gabriel's Gully. He settled on the West Coast in 1865, first in Hokitika but soon after he came to Greymouth. A journalist by profession, he was editor and part proprietor of the Greymouth Evening Star. Petrie was a member of the Jockey Club and Trotting Club. He married Miss Creer in 1874, and they had three surviving sons and two surviving daughters.

== Political career ==
New Zealand Parliament
Years	Term	Electorate	Party
1881–1884	8th	Greymouth	Independent

From 1875, Petrie was a member of Greymouth Borough for several decades until his death. He was mayor of Greymouth for two terms in 1887 and 1888. He was an inaugural councillor when Brunner Borough was formed in November 1887, simultaneous to his Greymouth mayoralty. Petrie was a member of the Greymouth Harbour Board for over 20 years.

He represented the Greymouth electorate from 1881 to 1884, when he was defeated by Arthur Guinness. At the 1905 election, Petrie challenged Guinness for the seat but Guinness retained his incumbency.

Petrie stood once more for the mayoralty of Greymouth in April 1907 and was successful.

== Death ==
On a business trip to Wellington in early April 1908, Petrie had a fall in the suburb of Newtown when leaving a tram. The tram suddenly jolted forward and Petrie was thrown heavily from the carriage. He was knocked out and sustained internal injuries. Taken to a private hospital, Petrie did not regain consciousness for two days.

Although hospitalised in Wellington, Petrie contested the Greymouth mayoral election later that month represented through his son John. The other candidate for the mayoralty withdrew, not wishing to cause the injured Petrie "any anxiety". Petrie was declared elected on 24 April but did not return from Wellington; he died there on 4 May 1908.

Petrie's body was shipped home on the steamer Mapourika for burial at the Greymouth cemetery. Members of the borough council carried his coffin from the ship and placed it in the goods shed before the hearse arrived. An estimated 2,500 people attended the funeral. Petrie's coffin was carried on a fire carriage with local councillors acting as pallbearers with two bands, the Druids and the Fire Brigade, trailing the procession. There was a strong representation from people from the hospital, education and the racing clubs as well as several members of Parliament. The Last Post sounded at the conclusion of the service.

== Notes ==
New Zealand Parliament
New constituency	Member of Parliament for Greymouth; 1881–1884	Succeeded by Arthur Guinness
