= Harry Holland =

New Zealand politician (1868–1933)

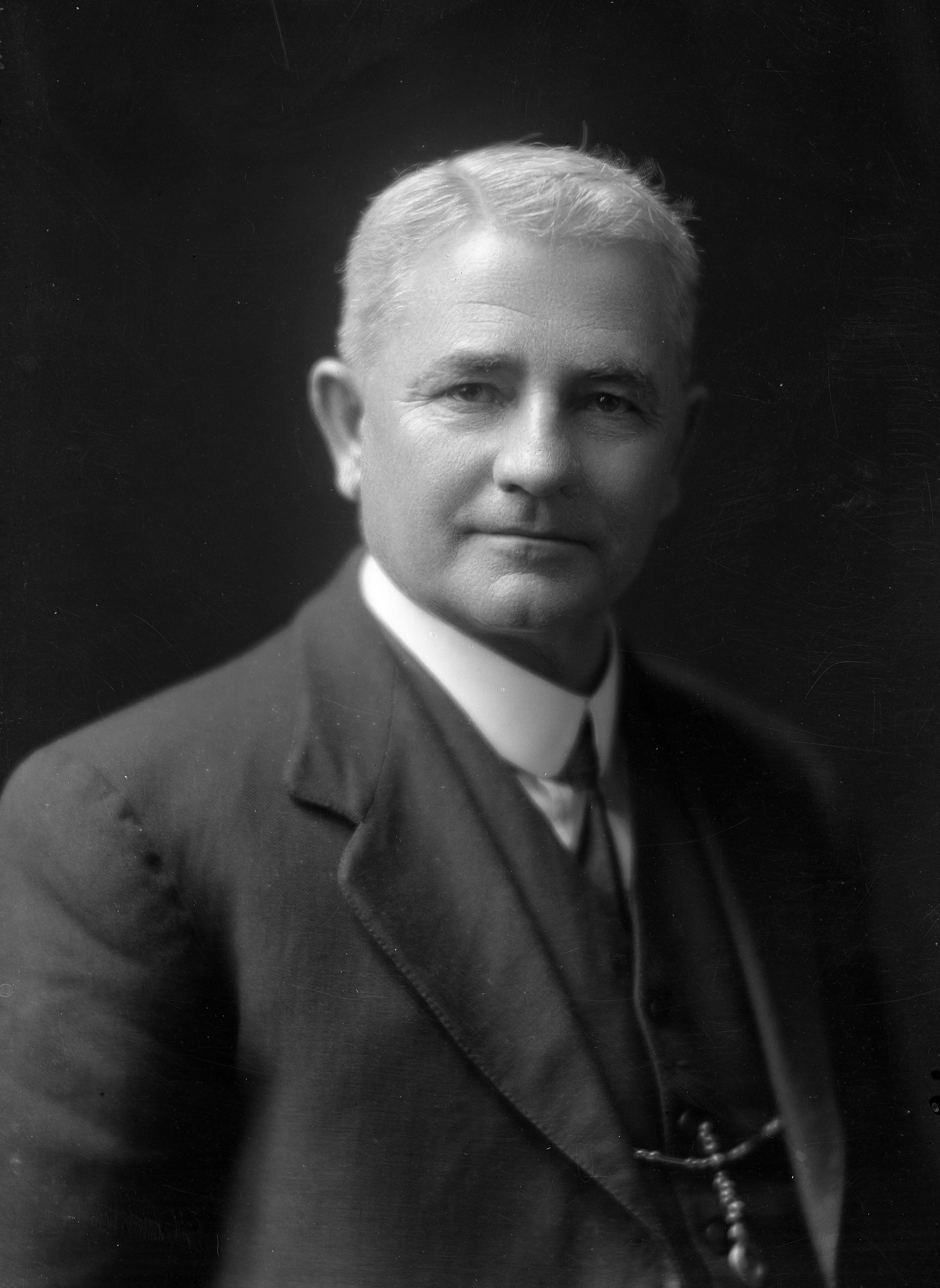
- Harry Holland in 1925

10th Leader of the Opposition
- In office 22 September 1931 – 8 October 1933
- Preceded by: Gordon Coates
- Succeeded by: Michael Joseph Savage
- In office 16 June 1926 – 18 October 1928
- Preceded by: George Forbes
- Succeeded by: Sir Joseph Ward

2nd Leader of the Labour Party
- In office 27 August 1919 – 8 October 1933
- Deputy: James McCombs (1919–23); Michael Joseph Savage (1923–33)
- Preceded by: Alfred Hindmarsh
- Succeeded by: Michael Joseph Savage

Member of the New Zealand Parliament for Buller
- In office 17 December 1919 – 8 October 1933
- Preceded by: James Colvin
- Succeeded by: Paddy Webb

Member of the New Zealand Parliament for Grey
- In office 29 May 1918 – 17 December 1919
- Preceded by: Paddy Webb
- Succeeded by: electorate abolished

Personal details
- Born: 10 June 1868 Ginninderra, New South Wales, Australia
- Died: 8 October 1933 (aged 65) Huntly, New Zealand
- Party: Labour
- Spouse: Annie McLachlan (m. 1888)
- Children: 7

Henry Edmund Holland (10 June 1868 – 8 October 1933) was an Australian-born newspaper owner, politician and unionist who relocated to New Zealand. He was the second leader of the New Zealand Labour Party.

== Early life ==
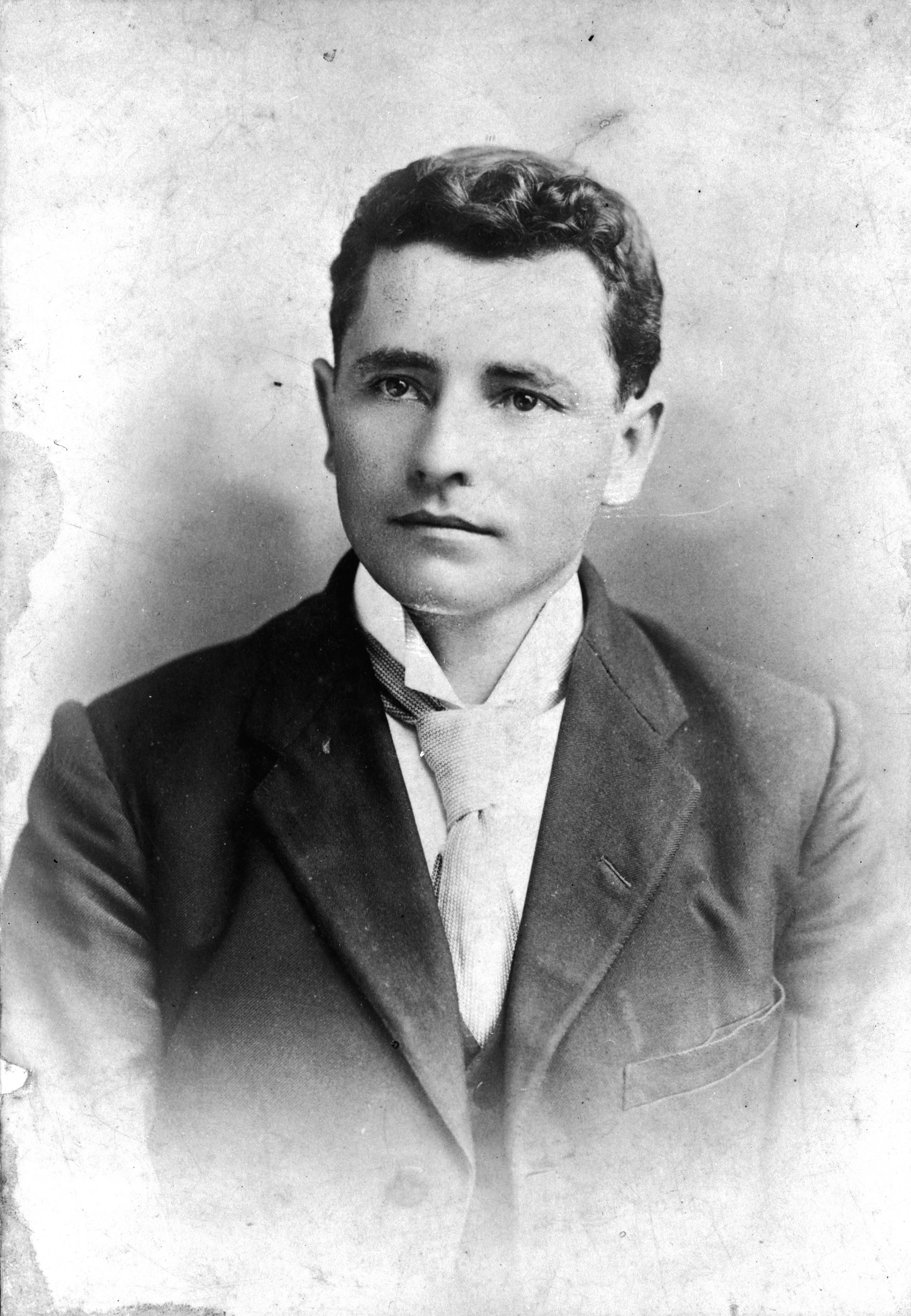
Harry Holland in Newcastle, 1897

Holland was born at Ginninderra, a rural village that would later become part of the Canberra suburbs. He was born to Mary (née Chaplin) and Edward Holland, as the second of five children. Initially, he worked on his parents' farm, but later was apprenticed as a compositor for the Queanbeyan Times in nearby Queanbeyan, where he was first introduced to socialist thought. Holland did not receive an extensive formal education, but developed a great enthusiasm for reading that would continue throughout his life. He also became highly religious, joining the Salvation Army.

In 1887, Holland left Queanbeyan to work in Sydney. Shortly afterwards, on 6 October 1888, he married Annie McLachlan, whom he had met at a Salvation Army meeting. The two were to have five sons and three daughters. In 1890, however, Holland found himself unemployed, putting the family in a poor financial position. Holland left the Salvation Army at this point, believing that its response to poverty was inadequate; he remained, however, quite strongly religious. Gradually, his political views became attuned to socialism, although this was probably more an emotional decision than a theoretical one — Holland was deeply dedicated to the elimination of poverty, but had little use for complicated economic models. Despite leaving the Salvation Army, he retained a sense of personal mission, scorn of moderation, impatience with piecemeal reform and a sense of undeviating righteousness.

== Political activity in Australia ==
Holland joined the Australian Socialist League in 1892. Later, he and a friend began to publish a socialist journal — in 1896, he was convicted of libelling the superintendent of the New South Wales Labour Bureau, and served three months in prison. Upon his release, the journal was moved to Newcastle for a time, but eventually returned to Sydney.

In 1901, Holland stood as a candidate for the Australian Senate and the state seat of Sydney-Lang. He was standing for the Socialist Labor Party, having rejected the Labor Party as too moderate. He did not make any significant impression. Later, in 1907, he stood in the New South Wales state election, but was caught up in strong infighting between socialist groups. Holland had acquired a reputation of arrogance and egotism, and was convinced beyond all doubt that his views were correct.

Holland was convicted of sedition over a speech made at Broken Hill in April, in which he advocated for miners to resist police by force if they deemed it necessary; he was the first person ever to be charged with sedition in New South Wales. He was sentenced to two years' hard labour, but was released after just five months after 50,000 people signed a petition demanding his release. Holland suffered from depression during this period, which, combined with chronic overwork, led to his health breaking down by 1911.

In 1912, after his release from jail, Holland soon found himself in trouble with the law again. This time, it resulted from his refusal to register his son for compulsory military training. Rather than pay a fine, Holland left Australia and travelled to New Zealand, accepting an invitation from the Waihi branch of the New Zealand Socialist Party. He was paid £2 a week plus travelling expenses for three months of lecturing and organising. His arrival would normally have been controversial, due to his felonious past, but was overshadowed by industrial action in Waihi.

== Political activity in New Zealand ==
=== Waihi ===
At the time of Holland's arrival, Waihi was descending into chaos. A bitter miners' strike, the most significant industrial action that New Zealand had yet seen, was underway, and the conservative government of William Massey was responding with strong measures. The strike eventually led to the death of a miner in a shoot-out with police. Holland was encouraged by the strike, believing that it was the beginning of "class war" against capitalism. This view was not shared, however, by the New Zealand Socialist Party, which, when the strike broke out, had actually asked Holland not to come to Waihi. The New Zealand socialists, for the most part, saw socialism as a means to an end, and distrusted Holland's view that socialism was a goal in and of itself. Many New Zealand socialists resented Holland's arrogance, seeing him as a self-opinionated outsider meddling in a precarious situation that he did not fully understand. Afterwards, Holland co-authored the prolific The Tragic Story of the Waihi Strike pamphlet with a fellow Australian agitator, Robert Samuel Ross.

=== Moderation ===
Gradually, however, Holland's militancy decreased. In 1913, following the failure of the strike, he attended the second unity conference as a delegate. His co-authorship with Ross of the pamphlet on the strike gained him a certain amount of prestige, as did his editorship of the Federation of Labour's newspaper, the Maoriland Worker 1913–18. In 1913, a candidate of the Social Democratic Party (or SDP, which the Socialist Party had merged into) was elected to Parliament with backing from the mainstream Liberal Party, and Holland was happy — at one stage, he would have condemned co-operation with any non-socialist organisation. Holland himself, however, still ran into difficulties with the law. In the 1913 waterfront dispute, he was charged with sedition, and was sentenced to one year in jail for using seditious language coming close to advocating for violence against the government. His friends Reverend Richard Hobday and Walter Nash visited Holland in prison and witnessed signs of mistreatment. Years later Nash described his visit: "They made me stay outside the door, they would not let me inside his cell. They would not let him have a razor so he was all bristly with ugly growth out of his face … I had a talk with him, with somebody standing by me to listen to what I said. He said, 'I didn't say what they say I said, but if I said it I would justify it.'" This time, however, he was widely seen by the public as a martyr, and gained considerable support. Holland was initially selected as the SDP candidate to stand for Mayor of Wellington at the 1914 election, but was unable to contest the mayoralty as he was engaged in the sedition case, so John Glover stood in his place.

At the 1914 election Holland stood for the SDP in the Wellington North electorate, finishing third. In 1915 he stood as an SDP candidate for the Wellington City Council. He was unsuccessful but polled much higher than any of the other candidates on the labour ticket.

== Parliamentary career ==
New Zealand Parliament
Years	Term	Electorate	Party
1918–1919	19th	Grey	Labour
1919–1922	20th	Buller	Labour
1922–1925	21st	Buller	Labour
1925–1928	22nd	Buller	Labour
1928–1931	23rd	Buller	Labour
1931–1933	24th	Buller	Labour

With the gradual unification of the labour movement in New Zealand, the (second) Labour Party was founded in 1916. Holland was one of the founding members, although his opinions about the direction of the party were not identical to some of the party's other leaders. Holland believed that the Labour Party would lay the foundations for socialism, while the more moderate members of the party simply wanted to improve the wages and conditions of workers. He stood again for the now unified Labour Party for the city council in 1917 where, though still unsuccessful, his vote share rose over 10%.

Holland began contemplating leaving New Zealand and returning to Sydney though was persuaded to stay when he was selected as a candidate for the 1918 Wellington North by-election. His campaign stood on the grounds of opposing conscription, inflation and wartime 'special privilege'. His campaign organiser Peter Fraser encouraged Holland to directly challenge Prime Minister William Massey and Minister of Defence James Allen over the treatment of conscientious objectors in Europe which resulted in replies from both. As a result, Holland became a household name in Wellington. Although he narrowly missed out on election, Holland reveled in the personal attacks made on him which was exactly the type of recognition he craved.

In 1918, Paddy Webb, a Labour MP, was jailed for refusing military service. Holland stood in the resulting Grey by-election to replace him. Holland was chosen based on his strong performance four months earlier in the Wellington North by-election and was a surprise to most given he was not from the West Coast, with many expecting Mark Fagan to be selected. Holland accepted with the knowledge that he was to resign the seat when Webb was released. Many Liberal Party supporters who had previously voted for Webb, thought Holland too extremist and withdrew their support leading to a reduced turnout. He was narrowly elected and delighted with his victory, but other members of the party were less enthusiastic as Holland's majority was far lower than Webb's had been. Holland dismissed this, saying that his victory, unlike Webb's, had been for pure socialism rather than mere reform. Holland represented the Grey electorate 1918–19, and then the Buller electorate from 1919 until he died.

Initially, in Parliament Holland was not a particularly strong performer. His aggressive oratory, while suitable for speeches, tended to oversimplify issues, and Holland was frequently criticised in Parliamentary debates as an impractical ideologue. Holland's opponents successfully characterised him as applying simplistic doctrines to complicated issues, and of failing to look at a problem from all sides. Holland spoke in support of the Bolshevik revolution and a failed German socialist revolution as well as denouncing the secret diplomacy that formulated the treaties following the war. Newspapers were highly critical of Holland and his stance, labelling him as both pro-German and pro-Bolshevik. This put him at odds with his colleagues who were more doubtful of the revolutions overseas.

=== Party leader ===
Shortly before the 1919 election, the first contested by the Labour party as a united bloc, Holland contested for the leadership of the Labour party. Previous Labour leader Alfred Hindmarsh had died in the influenza epidemic in late 1918 leaving the position open. His only opponent was previous party president James McCombs, who had more parliamentary experience than Holland. The caucus voted and the result was a draw, though after a draw by lot, Holland won the parliamentary leadership of the party, becoming Labour's next leader. Most historians see his victory as being due to his public profile rather than to his policies, which many in the Labour Party considered too extreme.

Holland came to personally personify the Labour Party in a way that his predecessors did not due to his superb oratory on public platforms where he could draw large crowds. He built up a core following among his caucus consisting of Michael Joseph Savage, Peter Fraser, Bob Semple and later Walter Nash. All were to become not only loyal lieutenants to Holland during his tenure, but the most influential members of the First Labour Government following Holland's death.

In 1922 there were movements towards a proposed alliance between the Labour and Liberal parties, similar to the Lib-Lab Pact in the UK. This was in order to avoid vote splitting, particularly in marginal semi-urban electorates. Holland and the party executive began negotiations with Liberal leader Thomas Wilford about conducting a joint campaign and if successful, forming a coalition government which would set up a proportionally represented electoral system. However, the talks collapsed after Wilford demanded on holding on to office for a full term before holding an election under the new system, Holland thinking he would use this time to attempt to discredit Labour.

=== Leader of the Opposition ===
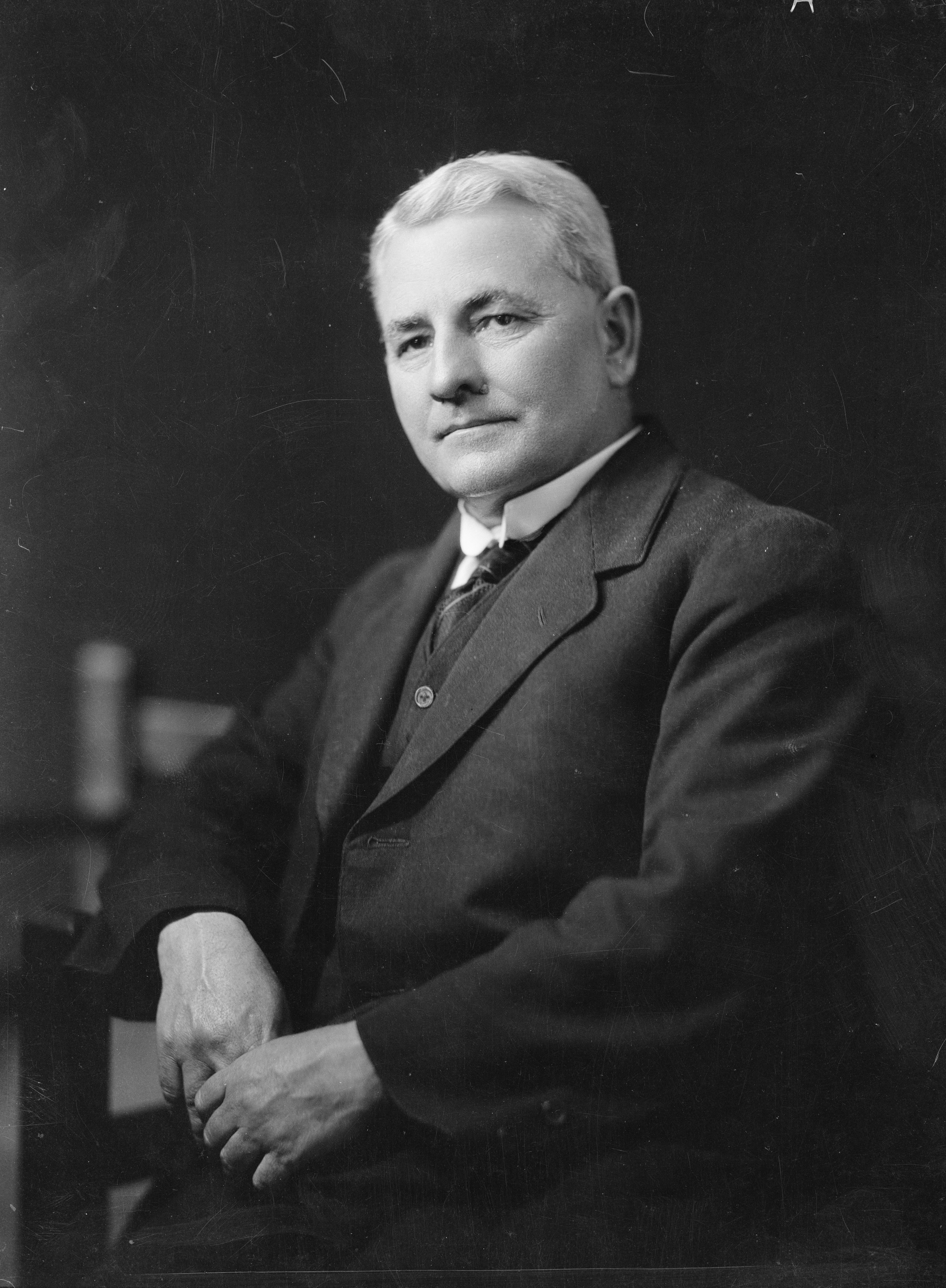
Holland in 1922

In 1925 Labour suffered a setback, losing 5 seats despite gaining 3.5% more of the vote. However, Holland became Leader of the Opposition on 16 June 1926, as a result of the Eden by-election. Labour had now surpassed the Liberal Party as the second largest party in Parliament. Following the 1928 election the results showed a hung parliament. Labour held the balance of power and chose to give reluctant support to the United Party (a renamed Liberal Party) rather than continue to let Reform govern. As a result of this Holland lost the status of Leader of the Opposition to ousted prime minister Gordon Coates. Holland attributed the loss to the failure of all trade unionists to support Labour, although had Labour won in 1928 it may well have been denied its long tenure of office which followed after 1935. Some unions were critical of the decision to give support to United. Holland rationalized it as "a preference of bad to worse."

By the 1930s Holland had a decreasing influence on policy details, with most being instead written by the party general secretary, Nash, who would only consult with Holland when writing manifestos. The main reason for this was Holland's personal financial situation which led to much of his attention being spent on writing articles and pamphlets to supplement his parliamentary salary. By 1929 he was in debt and had no life or fire insurance. Eventually he received financial aid from the party head office who provided 1/3 of a salary for an assistant to help Holland with his correspondence (he received 679 letters from January to March 1930 alone) with Holland paying the rest. He also published a book, Red Roses on the Highway, in 1924. He also concentrated his writings and speeches more on foreign affairs. Holland was particularly critical of the government's treatment of the people of Western Samoa. His colleagues attempted to dissuade him from putting an item on Samoa in an election manifesto, thinking it would not be helpful politically by saying that Samoa was not British. Holland protested, "But it's right!" John A. Lee thought that Holland had a "Samoan complex" and told him so.

Labour's support for United lasted until 1931 until the Great Depression took hold. Holland disagreed with United on financial policy to combat the depression and its effects. Holland decided to withdraw support from the government and moved for a vote of no confidence, intending to trigger an election where he thought many disenchanted voters would switch to Labour. Much to his surprise, the Reform party voted with United and the two entered into a coalition denying Holland his chance to seize the initiative. An election was held at the years end and Labour improved well, but still fell short of winning Government.

As the Depression worsened, Holland began to doubt some of his convictions. At first, Holland had believed that the Depression marked the beginning of the end for capitalism, but as the economic problems continued, and many workers were cast into poverty, Holland began to question whether his theories were capable of solving the crisis. He became instead increasingly interested in credit theory as a possible solution. Suffering from depression, exhaustion, and ill health, Holland began to withdraw from the activities of leadership. Talk of a possible challenge to his leadership appeared, but there was not yet any willingness for an open confrontation.

== Death ==
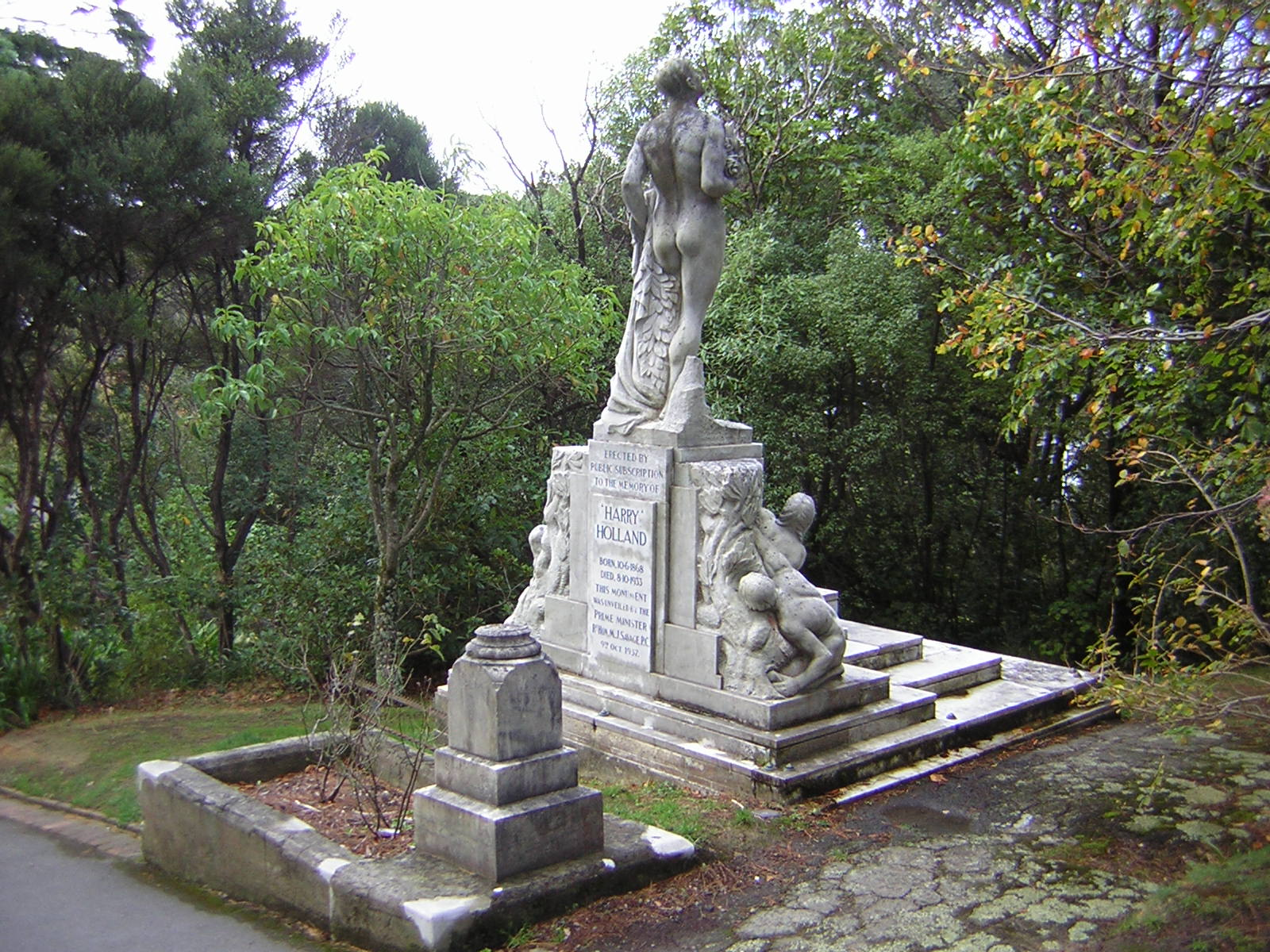
Harry Holland's memorial in Wellington

In 1933, Holland unexpectedly died of a heart attack, attending the funeral of the Maori King Te Rata Mahuta in Huntly. He was given a state funeral, and hailed by his friends as a "compassionate champion of the common people". Holland had died in debt. At the time the position of Leader of the Opposition did not have a higher salary to cover the extra costs that the office demanded. Holland's son served for free as his secretary and he also received help from friends to avoid being forced out of parliament on financial grounds. Holland had been receiving less money than a general labourer and the Prime Minister George Forbes approved a paid full-time secretary and a £600 grant to Holland's widow. He was survived by five sons and two daughters.

Holland's successor, the more moderate Michael Joseph Savage, went on to lead the Labour Party to victory in the 1935 election. Holland has a memorial in the Bolton Street Cemetery in Wellington, with the inscription "This monument is dedicated to Henry Edmund Holland Leader of the Labour Party 1919-33 to commemorate his work for humanity. He devoted his life to free the world from unhappiness, tyranny and oppression." The memorial, near that of Richard Seddon, was unveiled in 1937 by Savage.

Holland was an avid reader in his adult life due to his short time of schooling in his youth. In the South Island mining town of Seddonville, within Holland's Buller electorate, the H. E. Holland Public Library was named in his honour in 1929 after he spearheaded the campaign to rebuild it after it was destroyed by flooding.

== See also ==
- Electoral history of Harry Holland
- Shadow Cabinet of Harry Holland

== Sources ==
- Bassett, Michael; King, Michael (2000). Tomorrow Comes the Song: A Life of Peter Fraser. Auckland: Penguin. ISBN 0-14-029793-6.
- Brown, Bruce (1966). "Holland, Henry Edmund". In McLintock, A. H. (ed.). An Encyclopaedia of New Zealand. Ministry for Culture and Heritage.
- Gustafson, Barry (1980). Labour's path to political independence: the origins and establishment of the NZ Labour Party 1900–1919. Auckland, New Zealand: Auckland University Press. ISBN 0-19-647986-X.
- O'Farrell, Patrick (1964). Harry Holland: Militant Socialist. Canberra, Australia: Australian National University Press.
- O'Farrell, Patrick (1983). "Holland, Henry Edmund (Harry) (1868–1933)". Australian Dictionary of Biography.
- O'Farrell, Patrick (1996). "Holland, Henry Edmund". Dictionary of New Zealand Biography.
- Robb, James (2025). To Free the World. Paraparaumu Beach: Steele Roberts. ISBN 978-1-99-115388-3.
- Sinclair, Keith (1976). Walter Nash. Auckland: Oxford University Press. ISBN 0-19-647949-5.

Political offices
Preceded by Gordon Coates	Leader of the Opposition; 1931–1933 1925–1928	Succeeded by Michael Joseph Savage
Preceded by George Forbes	Leader of the Opposition; 1931–1933 1925–1928	Succeeded by Sir Joseph Ward
Party political offices
Preceded by Alfred Hindmarsh	Leader of the Labour Party; 1919–1933	Succeeded by Michael Joseph Savage
New Zealand Parliament
Preceded by Paddy Webb	Member of Parliament for Grey; 1918–1919	Constituency abolished
Preceded by James Colvin	Member of Parliament for Buller; 1919–1933	Succeeded by Paddy Webb
