= 1913 Grey by-election =

New Zealand by-election

- 17 July 1913 (first round); 24 July 1913 (second round)
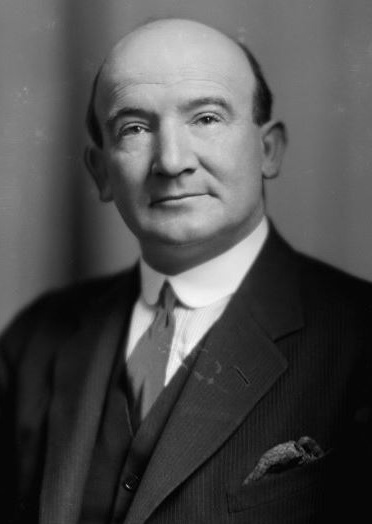

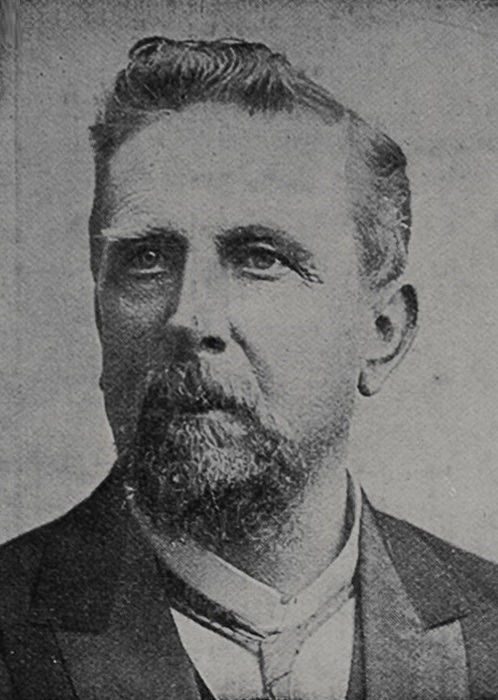
Candidate	Paddy Webb	Henry Michel
Party	Social Democrat	Reform
Popular vote	3,477	2,811
Percentage	55.30	44.70
Member before election
Arthur Guinness
Liberal
Elected Member
Paddy Webb
Social Democrat

The Grey by-election of 1913 was a by-election held for Grey during the 18th New Zealand Parliament. As no candidate won an absolute majority on the first ballot on 17 July, a second round was held on 24 July. The seat had become vacant due to the death of Arthur Guinness. Three candidates contested the seat, and it was won by the left-wing candidate, who was elected on the second ballot with Liberal support.

== Results ==
The following tables give the election results:

=== First ballot ===
1913 Grey by-election: First ballot
Party	Candidate	Votes	%	±%
Reform	Henry Michel	2,189	34.64	
Social Democrat	Paddy Webb	2,091	33.09	
Liberal	Michael Hannan	2,039	32.27	
Turnout		6,319		

=== Second ballot ===
1913 Grey by-election: Second ballot
Party	Candidate	Votes	%	±%
Social Democrat	Paddy Webb	3,477	55.30	
Reform	Henry Michel	2,811	44.70	
Majority		666	10.60	
Turnout		6,288		
Social Democrat gain from Liberal		Swing		
