= Bishopdale College =

Coordinates: 41.27308047°S 173.27909050°E

Bishopdale College is a theological college in Nelson, New Zealand. Its former dean is the now Assistant Bishop of Adelaide, Tim Harris. It opened in 1868.

Eminent alumni include

- John Pratt Kempthorne
- George William York
