= Pratt Kempthorne =

New Zealand Anglican priest (1849-1931)

John Pratt Kempthorne (called Pratt; b Auckland 16 Oct 1849 - d Nelson 10 Sep 1931) was an Anglican priest in the last three decades of the Nineteenth century and the first three of the 20th.

Kempthorne was educated at Church of England Grammar School, Auckland; St John's College, Auckland; and Bishopdale College. He was ordained deacon in 1873, and priest in 1876. After a curacy in Stoke he held incumbencies at Reefton, Greymouth and Nelson. He was Archdeacon of Waimea from 1916 to 1926.
