= 1918 Wellington North by-election =

New Zealand by-election

- 12 February 1918

The Wellington North seat in the House of Representatives. Election by simple majority using first-past-the-post voting.
- Turnout: 7,128
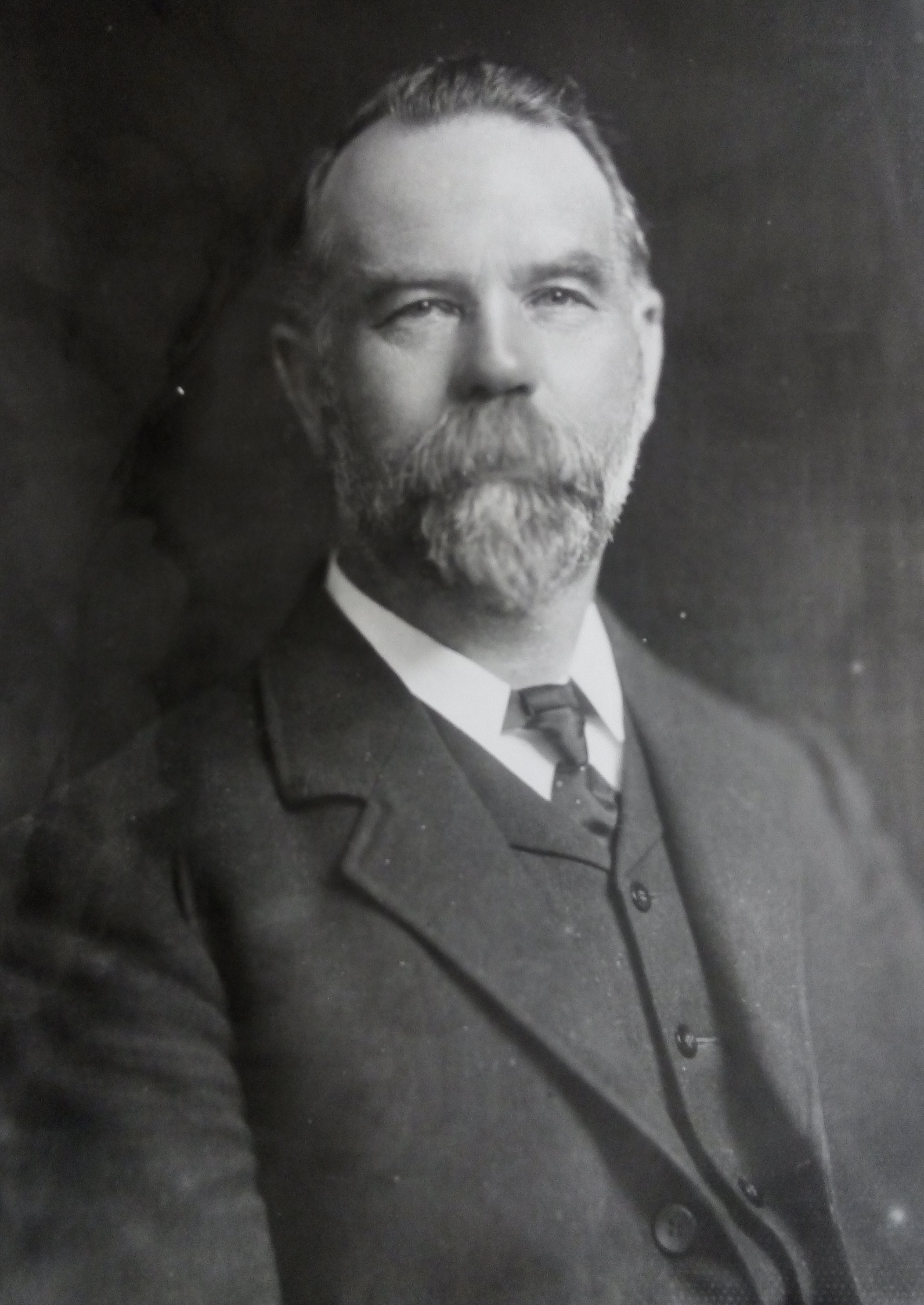

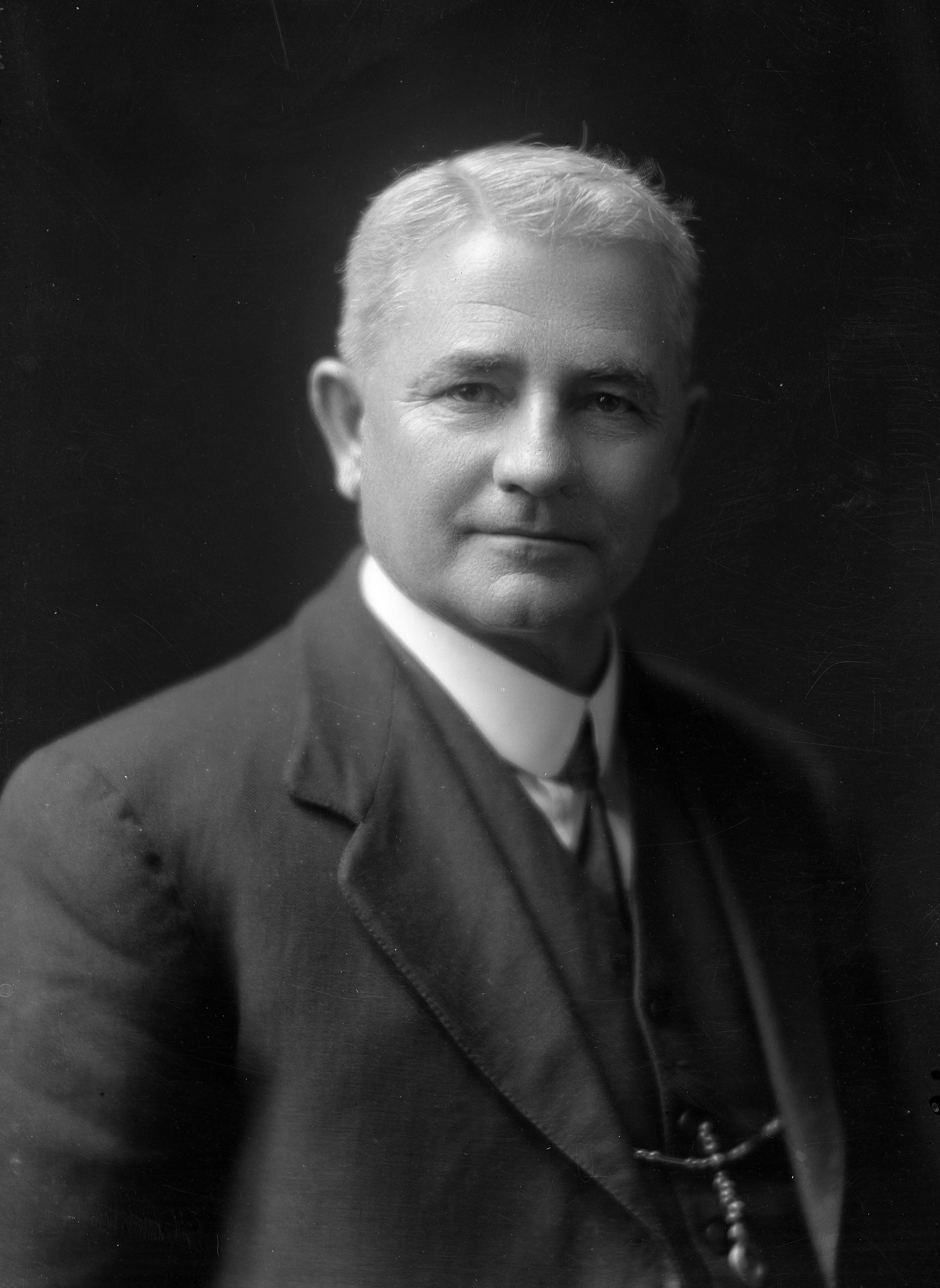

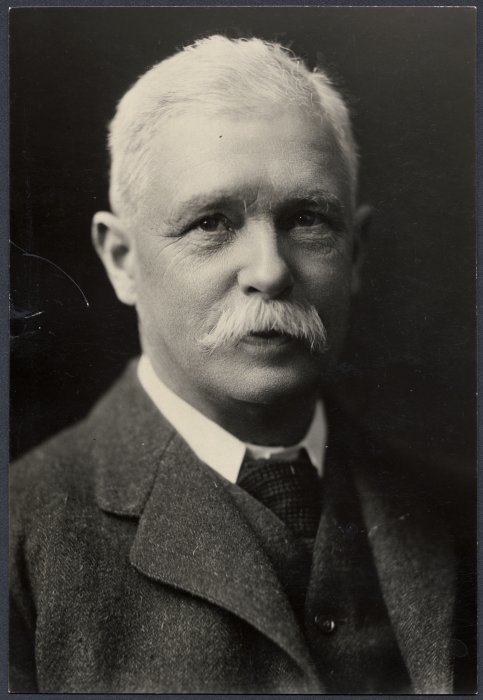
Candidate	John Luke	Harry Holland	Alfred Brandon
Party	Reform	Labour	Liberal
Popular vote	2,986	2,566	816
Percentage	41.89	35.99	11.44
Member before election
Alexander Herdman
Reform
Elected Member
John Luke
Reform

The Wellington North by-election of 1918 was a by-election held in the Wellington North electorate during the 19th New Zealand Parliament, on 12 February 1918. It was caused by the resignation of incumbent MP Alexander Herdman of the Reform Party, who was appointed as a judge of the Supreme Court, and was won by John Luke with a majority of 420.

== Candidates ==
Then current mayor of Wellington John Luke was selected as the Reform Party's candidate.

Under the terms of the coalition agreement between Reform and the Liberal's a condition was made not to oppose each other in by-elections for deceased or retiring MP's from their own parties. However, the Liberal Party were not completely satisfied with Luke being the Government's candidate and two Liberal candidates emerged to contest. Former mayor of Wellington Alfred Brandon chose to contest the seat and another, Angus Polson chose to likewise contest as an Independent Liberal.

The Labour Party chose Harry Holland, editor of the Maoriland Worker, as their candidate who had contested the seat in 1914 for the Social Democratic Party coming third. Holland was contemplating leaving New Zealand at the time and returning to Sydney though his candidacy persuaded him to stay. Holland reveled in the personal attacks made on him which was exactly the type of recognition he craved.

== Campaign ==
Peter Fraser became Holland's campaign organiser where he demonstrated great strategic skill. Holland stood on the grounds of opposing conscription, inflation and wartime 'special privilege'. Fraser encouraged Holland to directly challenge Prime Minister William Massey and Minister of Defence James Allen over the treatment of conscientious objectors in Europe which resulted in replies from both. As a result, Holland became a household name in Wellington.

== Results ==
The results of the Wellington North electorate at the 1914 general election were:

1914 general election
Party	Candidate	Votes	%	±%
Reform	Alexander Herdman	4,550	55.23	
Liberal	William Turnbull	1,895	23.00	
Social Democrat	Harry Holland	1,688	20.49	
Majority		2,655	32.23	
Informal votes		104	1.26	
Turnout		8,237	82.90	
Registered electors		9,936		

Results of the by-election held on 12 February 1918 were:

1918 Wellington North by-election
Party	Candidate	Votes	%	±%
Reform	John Luke	2,986	41.89	
Labour	Harry Holland	2,566	35.99	+15.50
Liberal	Alfred Brandon	816	11.44	
Independent Liberal	Angus James Neville Polson	720	10.10	
Majority		420	5.89	
Informal votes		40	0.56	−0.70
Turnout		7,128		
Reform hold		Swing		

== Outcome ==
Though the National Government retained the seat many within were alarmed by the near success of Labour. Their majority of 1,807 in 1914 shrunk to just 420 was a shock to conservative minds. At the declaration of Luke's victory, Prime Minister William Massey spoke to the crowd. He was greeted by much jeering and was pelted with eggs and rotten fruit. He lost his temper and thumbed his nose at them before storming off the stage, later re-created in an effective newspaper cartoon. A Reform sympathising newspaper, Herald, suggested improper means being used to increase the Labour vote so dramatically, saying of the results:

Mr Holland's large vote need cause no apprehension. It was made up of the steady 1500 socialists in the electorate, reinforced by several hundreds of 'trade' voters, hundreds of men who crowded into the boarding houses to comply with the one month's residence qualifications, and a few cravens — men and women who hoped that Mr Holland might retard or stop the sending of reinforcements to the army.

However, the result was more a reflection of the growing disenchantment at the National Government bound with Labour (who refused the coalition) being seen as the only alternative. Based on his strong performance in Wellington North, Holland was chosen by the Labour Party as their candidate in the Grey by-election four months later where Holland was eventually successful in winning a seat in Parliament.
