= Grey (New Zealand electorate) =

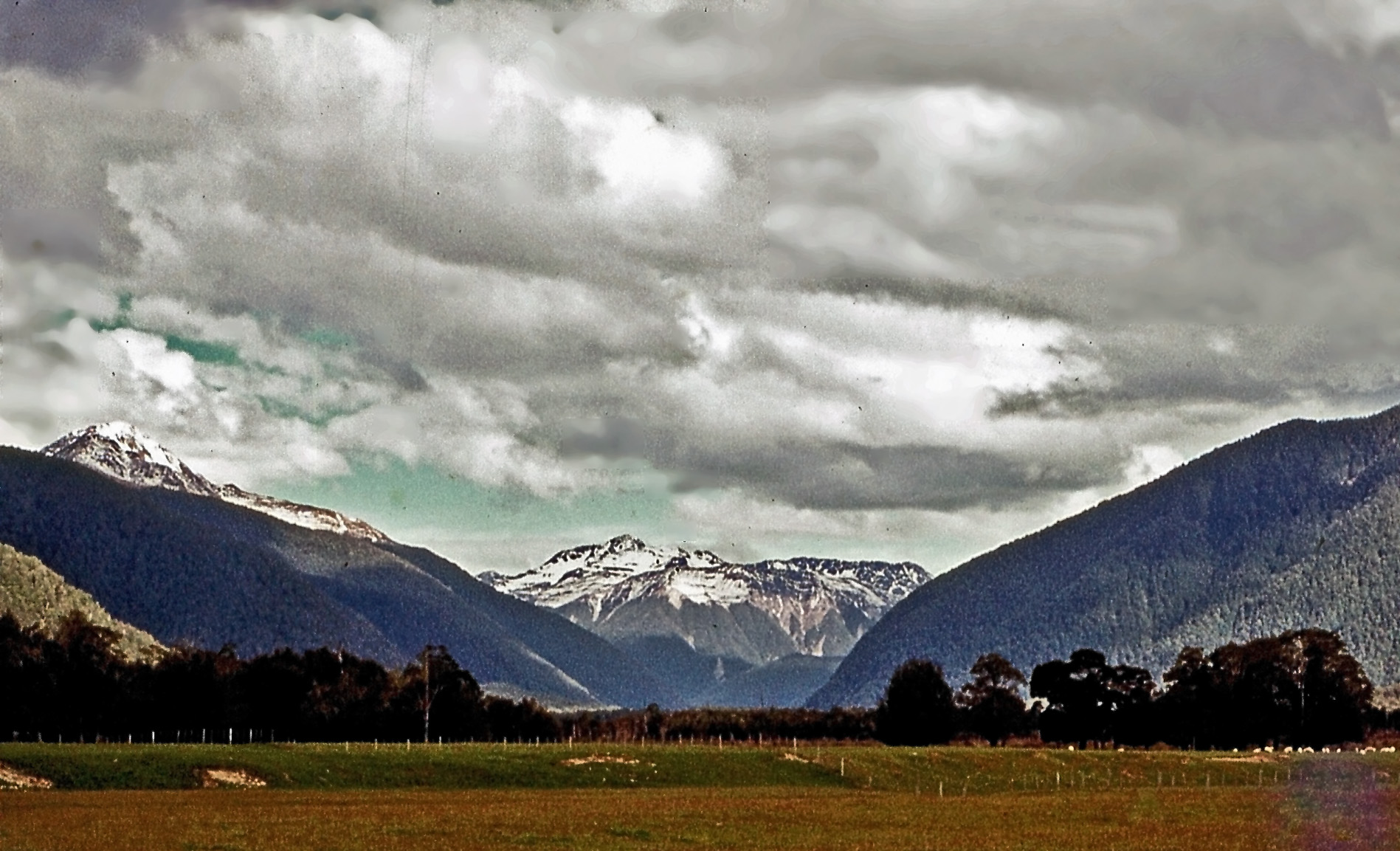
Grey Valley, Westland, New Zealand, 1976

Grey, originally formed as Greymouth, is a former parliamentary electorate in the West Coast region of New Zealand. The electorate of Greymouth was created for the 1881 general election, and lasted until 1890. In 1890 the Grey electorate was created, and was abolished in 1919.

== Population centres ==
Throughout the electorate's history, the town of Greymouth was always included in its area. The town of Brunner belonged to the electorate during most periods.

== History ==
Greymouth was represented from the 1881 general election by Joseph Petrie. He was defeated in the 1884 general election by Arthur Guinness, who represented the electorate (renamed in 1890 as Grey) until his death in 1913.

After the resulting 1913 by-election, the electorate was represented from 1916 to 1919 by two radical politicians from the West Coast coal mines representing the Labour Party or its predecessors. They were Paddy Webb, who was imprisoned in 1918, and Harry Holland, who represented Grey from the by-election on 29 May 1918 until 16 December 1919 when the electorate was abolished.

== Members of Parliament ==
The various electorates were represented by four members of parliament. From 1881 to 1890, Greymouth was a single-member electorate, renamed as Grey from 1890 to 1919.

Key

Independent	Liberal
Social Democrat	Labour

Election	Winner
1881 election	Joseph Petrie
1884 election	Arthur Guinness
1887 election	Arthur Guinness
1890 election	Arthur Guinness
1893 election	Arthur Guinness
1896 election	Arthur Guinness
1899 election	Arthur Guinness
1902 election	Arthur Guinness
1905 election	Arthur Guinness
1908 election	Arthur Guinness
1911 election	Arthur Guinness
1913 by-election	Paddy Webb
1914 election	Paddy Webb
1917 by-election	Paddy Webb
1918 by-election	Harry Holland
(Electorate abolished in 1919; see Buller)

== Election results ==
=== 1918 by-election ===
1918 Grey by-election
Party	Candidate	Votes	%	±%
Labour	Harry Holland	2,865	50.90	
Reform	Thomas Coates	2,717	48.27	
Informal votes		46	0.81	
Majority		148	2.62	
Turnout		5,628		

=== 1913 by-election, first ballot ===
1913 Grey by-election: First ballot
Party	Candidate	Votes	%	±%
Reform	Henry Michel	2,189	34.64	
Social Democrat	Paddy Webb	2,091	33.09	
Liberal	Michael Hannan	2,039	32.27	
Turnout		6,319		

=== 1913 by-election, second ballot ===
1913 Grey by-election: Second ballot
Party	Candidate	Votes	%	±%
Social Democrat	Paddy Webb	3,477	55.30	
Reform	Henry Michel	2,811	44.70	
Majority		666	10.60	
Turnout		6,288		
Social Democrat gain from Liberal		Swing		

=== 1899 election ===
1899 general election: Grey
Party	Candidate	Votes	%	±%
Liberal	Arthur Guinness	2,660	58.67	
Conservative	Michael Hannan	1,874	41.33	
Majority		786	17.34	
Turnout		4,534	79.22	
Registered electors		5,723		

=== 1893 election ===
1893 general election: Grey
Party	Candidate	Votes	%	±%
Liberal	Arthur Guinness	2,434	70.55	+20.12
Independent	Richard Nancarrow	711	20.61	
Liberal	R. F. Bell	305	8.84	
Majority		1,723	49.94	+48.63
Turnout		3,450	74.47	+6.90
Registered electors		4,633		

=== 1890 election ===
1890 general election: Grey
Party	Candidate	Votes	%	±%
Liberal	Arthur Guinness	1,109	50.43	
Liberal–Labour	William Hugh Jones	1,090	49.57	
Majority		29	1.31	
Turnout		2,199	67.57	
Registered electors		3,254		

=== 1884 election ===
1884 general election: Greymouth
Party	Candidate	Votes	%	±%
Independent	Arthur Guinness	848	58.16	
Independent	Joseph Petrie	610	41.84	
Majority		238	16.32	
Turnout		1,458	84.47	
Registered electors		1,726		
