= Charles Poole =

Charles Poole may refer to:

- Charles Poole (politician) (1874–1941), member of parliament in New Zealand
- Charles Lane Poole (1885–1970), English Australian forester
- Charlie Poole (1892–1931), American old-time musician

== See also ==
- Charles Pool (disambiguation)
