= 1918 Grey by-election =

New Zealand by-election

- 29 May 1918
- Turnout: 5,628 (71.75%)
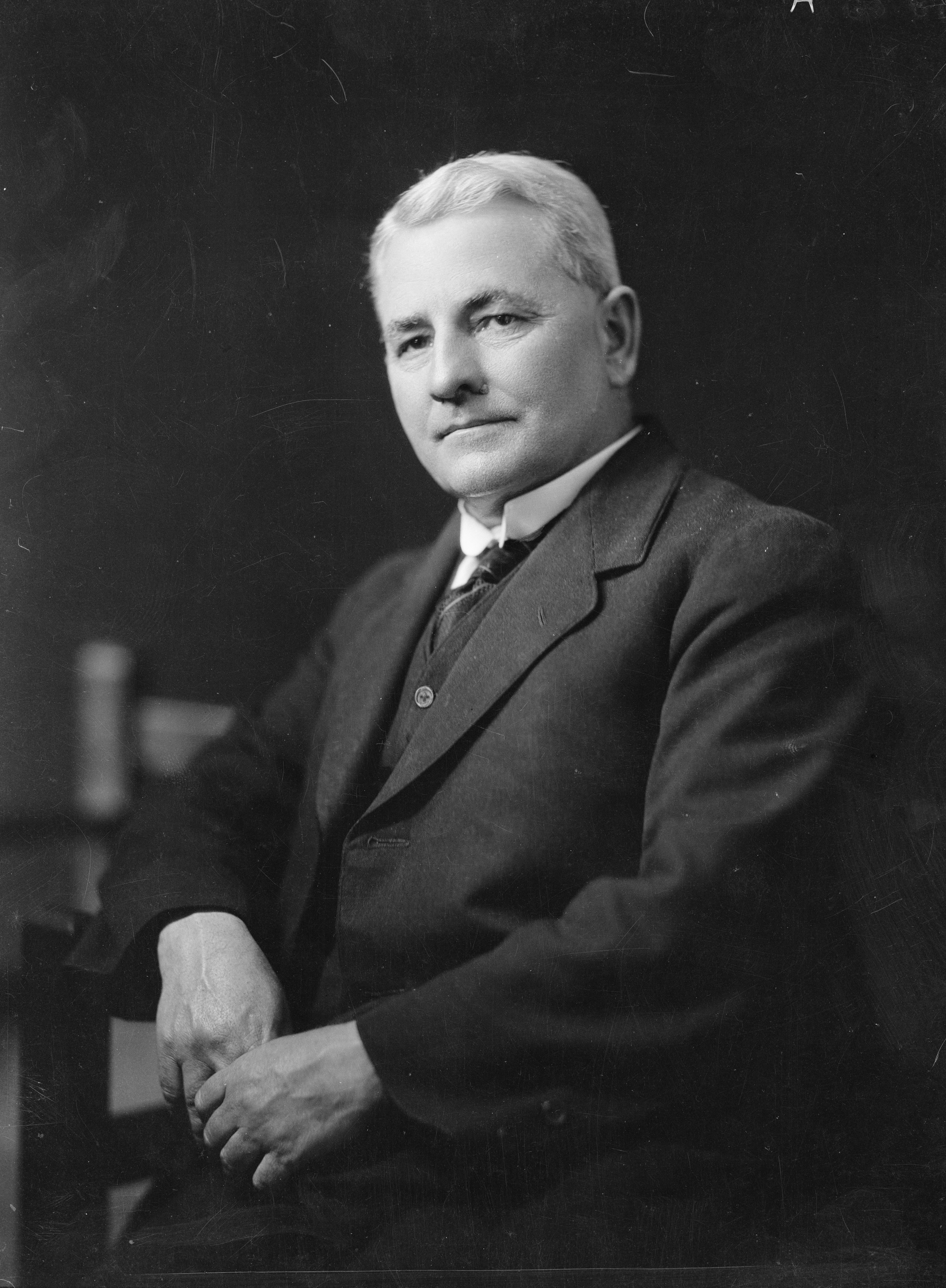

Candidate	Harry Holland	Thomas Coates
Party	Labour	Reform
Popular vote	2,865	2,717
Percentage	50.90	48.27
Member before election
Paddy Webb
Labour
Elected Member
Harry Holland
Labour

The Grey by-election of 1918 was a by-election during the 18th New Zealand Parliament. It was held on the 29 May 1918. The seat had become vacant due to the imprisonment of sitting member Paddy Webb who was jailed on the issue of his vocal opposition to conscription which had been enforced by Prime Minister William Massey. The by-election was won by the Labour candidate Harry Holland.

== Candidates ==
Two candidates contested the seat. The Labour Party candidate was Harry Holland, who was chosen based on his strong performance in the 1918 Wellington North by-election four months earlier. Holland's candidacy was a surprise to most as he was not from the West Coast, with many expecting Mark Fagan to be selected. Holland accepted with the knowledge that he was to resign the seat when Webb was released.

Former Mayor of Greymouth Thomas Eldon Coates, a local farmer and lawyer, stood as the candidate for the national coalition government formed between the Reform and Liberal party's for the duration of the First World War.

Initially the Liberal Party intended to stand their own candidate, James Kerr (the son of the former member of the Legislative Council of the same name), but he withdrew in order to prevent the anti-Labour vote being split.

== Results ==
The following table gives the election results:

1918 Grey by-election
Party	Candidate	Votes	%	±%
Labour	Harry Holland	2,865	50.90	
Reform	Thomas Coates	2,717	48.27	
Informal votes		46	0.81	
Majority		148	2.62	
Turnout		5,628	71.75	
Registered electors		7,843		

== Outcome ==
Despite a lower voter turnout, Holland's majority was far lower than Webb's had been in 1914. Many in the Labour Party were displeased with the result and were suspicious of Holland's perceived radicalism. Holland defended this, writing to Josiah Cocking:

...the whole Labor movement is agreed that the victory is the greatest ever won by Labor in New Zealand — because it was the first time that Labor had ever succeeded in defeating the Tories & Liberals in a straight out fight.

A notable feature of the by-election was the poor voter turnout with well over a third abstaining. It was claimed that the majority of those who chose not to vote were Liberal Party supporters who had previously voted for Webb, thought Holland too extremist and withdrew their support.
