= Paddy Webb =

New Zealand politician (1884–1950)

The Honourable Paddy Webb
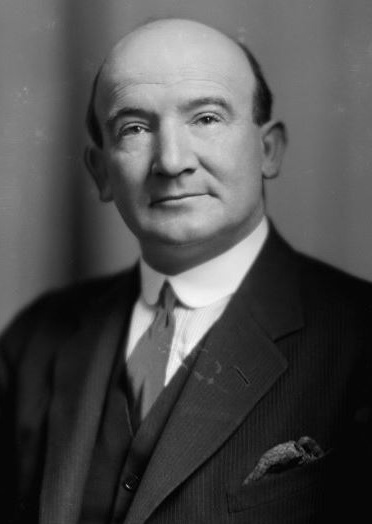
- Webb in 1935

29th Minister of Immigration
- In office 12 April 1944 – 19 December 1946
- Prime Minister: Michael Joseph Savage; Peter Fraser
- Preceded by: David Wilson (New Zealand Labour Party politician)
- Succeeded by: Angus McLagan

15th Minister of Labour
- In office 13 December 1938 – 27 June 1946
- Prime Minister: Michael Joseph Savage; Peter Fraser
- Preceded by: Tim Armstrong
- Succeeded by: James O'Brien

21st Minister of Mines
- In office 6 December 1935 – 27 June 1946
- Prime Minister: Michael Joseph Savage; Peter Fraser
- Preceded by: Charles Macmillan
- Succeeded by: James O'Brien

Member of the New Zealand Parliament for Buller
- In office 22 November 1933 – 27 November 1946
- Preceded by: Harry Holland
- Succeeded by: Jerry Skinner

Member of the New Zealand Parliament for Grey
- In office 24 July 1913 – April 1918
- Preceded by: Arthur Guinness
- Succeeded by: Harry Holland

Personal details
- Born: Patrick Charles Webb; 30 November 1884 Rutherglen, Victoria, Australia
- Died: 23 May 1950 (aged 65) Christchurch, New Zealand
- Party: Socialist Party (1911–13); Social Democrats (1913–16); Labour (1916–46)

Patrick Charles Webb (30 November 1884 – 23 March 1950) was a New Zealand trade unionist and politician.

== Early life ==
Webb was born in Rutherglen, a small town in the Australian state of Victoria. His father, George Webb, was a miner, and Paddy Webb eventually worked in the mines himself. He quickly became active in the mining unions, becoming head of the local Amalgamated Miners' Association branch by 1904. During this time, he met Michael Joseph Savage, who would eventually become the first Labour Prime Minister of New Zealand.

As a result of his involvement in strike action, Webb was blacklisted, and in 1905, he moved to New Zealand to seek work. After briefly living in Dunedin, he moved to the West Coast, working in mines first on the Denniston plateau and then at Runanga. Webb became involved with the New Zealand Socialist Party, and was an advocate for socialist ideals. Working in the Runanga mine, Webb was somewhat sheltered from repercussions he would otherwise have suffered – the Runanga mine was state-owned, and the governing Liberal Party was more tolerant of his agitation than private interests were. Webb scored a considerable victory when he organised a successful strike in 1908 at a mine in Blackball, and became prominent in the labour movement nationally.

== Early political career ==
New Zealand Parliament
| Years | Term | Electorate | Party |
|---|---|---|---|
| 1913–1914 | 18th | Grey | Social Democrat |
| 1914–1916 | 19th | Grey | Social Democrat |
| 1916–1917 | Changed allegiance to: | | Labour |
| 1917–1918 | 19th | Grey | Labour |
| 1933–1935 | 24th | Buller | Labour |
| 1935–1938 | 25th | Buller | Labour |
| 1938–1943 | 26th | Buller | Labour |
| 1943–1946 | 27th | Buller | Labour |

Webb was one of the more radical figures in the unions. Many of the older leaders continued to support the loose alliance between the labour movement and the Liberal Party, but Webb believed that only independent action could advance workers' interests. Webb was involved in founding the radical New Zealand Federation of Labour (the "Red Feds"), and in the 1911 election, he stood unsuccessfully in the Grey electorate in Parliament. He then played a major role in the 1913 "unity conference", in which the Socialist Party and the more moderate United Labour Party merged to form the Social Democratic Party. The Grey electorate became vacant in 1913, and he was nominated as the Social Democrat candidate. In the by-election he was elected on the second ballot with Liberal Party support, and in the 1914 general election, he was re-elected. In 1916, the Social Democrats merged with the remnants of the United Labour Party that had resisted the previous merger, forming the modern Labour Party.

== Jailed ==
In World War I, Webb became a prominent critic of conscription, and in April 1917, he was briefly jailed on charges of sedition. In October that year, Webb was selected for military service himself, but refused to comply. In order to seek a public mandate for his decision, he resigned from his seat in Parliament, and challenged the government to fight the by-election on the issue. The government refused, and Webb was returned to Parliament unopposed. Webb was subsequently offered a non-combat role, but again refused. He was then sentenced to two years hard labour, and was barred from political office for ten years. In 1918, his vacant seat in Parliament was won in a by-election by Harry Holland, also a member of the Labour Party.

After completing his sentence (spent planting trees), Webb returned to mining. He eventually established a cooperative coal depot in Christchurch. This brought him into conflict with certain radical members of the labour movement, who believed that the cooperative structure undermined unionism, since in a cooperative corporation (where the workers are also the owners), there is no need for workers to organise against the owners.

== Return to politics ==
In the 1932 Motueka by-election, Webb attempted to return to Parliament, but was defeated by Keith Holyoake. The following year, the death of Harry Holland (who had won Webb's old seat in 1918, and who now represented Buller) resulted in another by-election. Although Webb's nomination was opposed by radical members of the union movement, Webb was re-elected to Parliament, for Buller.

In 1935, he was awarded the King George V Silver Jubilee Medal.

When the Labour Party won the 1935 general election, Webb was appointed to Cabinet by Michael Joseph Savage, his old friend from the mines in Australia. He was given the position of Minister of Mines, a role in which he pressed for the nationalisation of the mining industry. Gradually, assisted by the heightened demand for coal during World War II, Webb oversaw the purchase of many major operations. During this slow process, Webb had to contend not only with opponents of nationalisation but with radicals who demanded the immediate nationalisation of the entire industry.

Webb had a reputation as Parliament's Lothario, and in mid-1939 he was being pursued by a woman for breach of promise to marry; the Hon Mark Fagan got Colin Scrimgeour then the head of commercial broadcasting to give her a job with radio station 1ZB in Auckland.

In 1946, Webb finally retired from politics. He died in Christchurch on 23 March 1950, and was buried at Bromley Cemetery.

Political offices
| Preceded by Tim Armstrong | Minister of Labour; 1938–1946 | Succeeded by James O'Brien |
| Preceded by Fred Jones | Postmaster-General and Minister of Telegraphs; 1940–1946 | Succeeded by Fred Hackett |
New Zealand Parliament
| Preceded by Arthur Guinness | Member of Parliament for Grey; 1913–1918 | Succeeded by Harry Holland |
| Preceded by Harry Holland | Member of Parliament for Buller; 1933–1946 | Succeeded by Jerry Skinner |
