= Electoral history of Michael Joseph Savage =

List of elections featuring Michael Joseph Savage as a candidate

This is a summary of the electoral history of Michael Joseph Savage, Prime Minister of New Zealand (1935–40), Leader of the Labour Party (1933–40), and Member of Parliament for Auckland West (1919–40).

== Parliamentary elections ==
=== 1911 election ===
1911 general election: Auckland Central
Party	Candidate	Votes	%	±%
Liberal	Albert Glover	4,061	53.20	−10.87
Socialist	Michael Joseph Savage	1,800	23.58	
Independent	James Gleeson	1,171	15.34	
Reform	William Richardson	601	7.87	
Informal votes		99	1.29	−0.92
Majority		2,261	29.62	−10.56
Turnout		7,633	71.25	−0.53
Registered electors		10,712		

=== 1914 election ===
1914 general election: Auckland Central
Party	Candidate	Votes	%	±%
Liberal	Albert Glover	4,053	56.93	+3.73
Social Democrat	Michael Joseph Savage	1,751	24.59	+1.01
Reform	William Richardson	1,315	18.47	+10.60
Informal votes		100	1.40	
Majority		2,302	32.33	
Turnout		7,119	78.11	+6.86
Registered electors		9,114		

=== 1919 election ===
1919 general election: Auckland West
Party	Candidate	Votes	%	±%
Labour	Michael Joseph Savage	4,008	44.24	
Reform	Charles Frederick Bennett	3,475	38.35	
Liberal	Andrew Entrican	1,493	16.48	
Informal votes		83	0.91	−0.10
Majority		533	5.88	
Turnout		9,059	85.47	+2.17
Registered electors		10,599		

=== 1922 election ===
1922 general election: Auckland West
Party	Candidate	Votes	%	±%
Labour	Michael Joseph Savage	5,649	55.42	+11.18
Reform	John Farrell	4,345	42.63	
Informal votes		153	1.50	+0.59
Majority		1,304	13.04	+7.16
Turnout		10,192	92.08	+6.61
Registered electors		11,068		

=== 1925 election ===
1925 general election: Auckland West
Party	Candidate	Votes	%	±%
Labour	Michael Joseph Savage	5,677	52.19	−3.23
Reform	Samuel Oldfield	5,201	47.81	
Informal votes		122	1.11	−0.39
Majority		476	4.38	−8.66
Turnout		11,000	89.55	−2.53
Registered electors		12,283		

=== 1928 election ===
1928 general election: Auckland West
Party	Candidate	Votes	%	±%
Labour	Michael Joseph Savage	5,361	47.01	−5.18
United	Richard Speirs	4,020	35.25	
Reform	Frank Adeane	2,021	17.72	
Informal votes		97	0.84	−0.27
Majority		1,341	11.76	+7.38
Turnout		11,499	86.25	−3.30
Registered electors		13,331		

=== 1931 election ===
1931 general election: Auckland West
Party	Candidate	Votes	%	±%
Labour	Michael Joseph Savage	6,442	62.93	+15.92
United	Hugh Ross Mackenzie	1,925	18.80	
Reform	John Allum	1,870	18.27	
Informal votes		63	0.61	−0.23
Majority		4,517	44.12	+32.36
Turnout		10,300	79.78	−6.47
Registered electors		12,911		

=== 1935 election ===
1935 general election: Auckland West
Party	Candidate	Votes	%	±%
Labour	Michael Joseph Savage	8,567	72.93	+10.00
United	Ernest David Stallworthy	2,387	20.32	
Democrat	Joseph Alexander Govan	792	6.74	
Informal votes		131	1.11	+0.50
Majority		6,180	52.61	+8.49
Turnout		11,746	88.56	+8.78
Registered electors		13,263		

=== 1938 election ===
1938 general election: Auckland West
Party	Candidate	Votes	%	±%
Labour	Michael Joseph Savage	11,591	75.88	+2.95
National	John W. Kealy	3,584	23.46	
Informal votes		100	0.65	−0.46
Majority		8,007	52.41	−0.20
Turnout		15,275	89.76	+1.20
Registered electors		17,017		

== Local-body elections ==
=== 1919 local-body elections ===
1919 Auckland Hospital Board election
Party	Candidate	Votes	%	±%
Labour	Florence Keller	7,142	79.68	
Citizens	Patrick Nerheny	4,322	48.22	
Citizens	Peter Mackay	4,122	45.98	
Labour	Michael Joseph Savage	3,993	44.54	
Citizens	George Knight	3,958	44.15	
Labour	George Davis	3,880	43.28	
Citizens	Alfred Hall-Skelton	3,552	39.62	
Independent	Ethel Kidd	3,241	36.15	
Independent	James Francis Hosking	2,748	30.65	
Labour	Bob Way	2,696	30.07	
Independent	Archibald Bryden	2,616	29.18	
Citizens	Paul Richardson	2,441	27.23	

=== 1921 local-body elections ===
1921 Auckland Hospital Board election
Party	Candidate	Votes	%	±%
Progressive Citizens'	William Wallace	8,963	60.44	
Progressive Citizens'	Peter Mackay	7,494	50.53	+4.35
Progressive Citizens'	George Knight	7,196	48.52	+4.37
Independent	Horatio Bagnall	6,939	46.79	
Labour	Michael Joseph Savage	6,291	42.42	−2.12
Progressive Citizens'	Alfred Hall-Skelton	5,717	38.55	−1.07
Independent	Arthur Sexton	5,597	37.74	
Progressive Citizens'	Patrick Nerheny	5,544	37.38	−10.84
Labour	George Davis	5,145	34.69	−8.59
Labour	Fred Bartram	4,114	27.74	
Independent	Charles Rossiter	3,905	26.33	
Labour	Oscar McBrine	3,666	24.72	
Labour	Winnifred Moore	3,470	23.40	

=== 1927 local-body elections ===
1927 Auckland Hospital Board election
Party	Candidate	Votes	%	±%
Progressive Citizens'	William Wallace	10,966	63.25	
Progressive Citizens'	Ethel Kidd	8,525	49.17	
Labour	Michael Joseph Savage	8,450	48.74	
Progressive Citizens'	John Dempsey	7,288	42.03	
Independent	George Knight	6,792	39.17	
Progressive Citizens'	Sidney Takle	5,266	30.37	
Progressive Citizens'	William Thompson	5,064	29.21	
Labour	Ivy McCready	4,567	26.34	
Independent	Alexander Eccles	4,377	25.24	
Labour	Dick Barter	4,349	25.08	
Labour	Jim Purtell	4,072	23.48	
Labour	Charles Stephen Morris	4,042	23.31	
Independent	Robert Darlow	4,010	23.13	
Independent	Emily Elizabeth Nicol	3,883	22.39	
Independent	John Lundon	3,277	18.90	
Independent	Samuel Zobel	1,751	10.11	

=== 1929 local-body elections ===
1929 Auckland Hospital Board election
Party	Candidate	Votes	%	±%
Progressive Citizens'	William Wallace	14,041	72.41	+9.16
Independent	Edward Gunson	12,633	65.15	
Labour	Michael Joseph Savage	10,614	54.74	+6.00
Progressive Citizens'	Ethel Kidd	9,534	49.18	+0.01
Independent	John Dempsey	7,166	36.95	−5.08
Progressive Citizens'	George Knight	6,968	35.93	−3.24
Progressive Citizens'	George Finlay	5,815	29.99	
Independent	John Lundon	4,958	25.57	+6.67
Labour	Mary Dreaver	4,840	24.96	
Labour	Alice Cassie	4,826	24.89	
Independent	William Thompson	4,084	21.06	−8.15
Independent	Harold Schmidt	3,837	19.78	
Labour	Ivy McCready	3,573	18.42	−7.92
Progressive Citizens'	William John McMillan	2,143	11.05	
Independent	Harry Taylor	1,911	9.85	

=== 1931 local-body elections ===
1931 Auckland Hospital Board election
Party	Candidate	Votes	%	±%
Citizens Committee	William Wallace	16,007	92.98	+20.57
Citizens Committee	Edward Gunson	13,983	81.22	+16.07
Labour	Michael Joseph Savage	13,392	77.79	+23.05
Citizens Committee	Ethel Kidd	13,130	76.27	+27.09
Labour	Fred Bartram	9,631	55.94	
Labour	Mary Dreaver	9,584	55.67	+30.71
Independent	John Lundon	6,645	38.60	+13.03
Independent	Harold Schmidt	3,702	21.50	+1.72

=== 1933 local-body elections ===
1933 Auckland Hospital Board election
Party	Candidate	Votes	%	±%
Citizens Committee	William Wallace	13,676	73.58	−19.40
Labour	Michael Joseph Savage	12,852	69.14	−8.65
Citizens Committee	Edward Gunson	11,077	59.59	−21.63
Citizens Committee	Ethel Kidd	9,928	53.41	−22.86
Labour	Mary Dreaver	8,088	43.51	−12.16
Citizens Committee	Sydney Harbutt	7,465	40.16	
Citizens Committee	Morris Copeland	6,361	34.22	
Labour	Bill Anderton	6,269	33.72	
Labour	James Purtell	5,955	32.04	
Labour	Hypatia Martin	5,521	29.70	
Independent	John Lundon	3,889	20.92	−17.68
Independent	Gerald Bell	2,115	11.37	

== Leadership elections ==
=== 1923 Deputy-leadership election ===
1923 Deputy-leadership election
Name	Votes	Percentage
Michael Joseph Savage	11	64.70%
Dan Sullivan	6	35.30%

=== 1933 Leadership election ===
1933 Leadership election
Name	Votes	Percentage
Michael Joseph Savage	24	100%
