= 1919 Wellington mayoral election =

New Zealand local election

- 30 April 1919
- Turnout: 17,290 (54.11%)
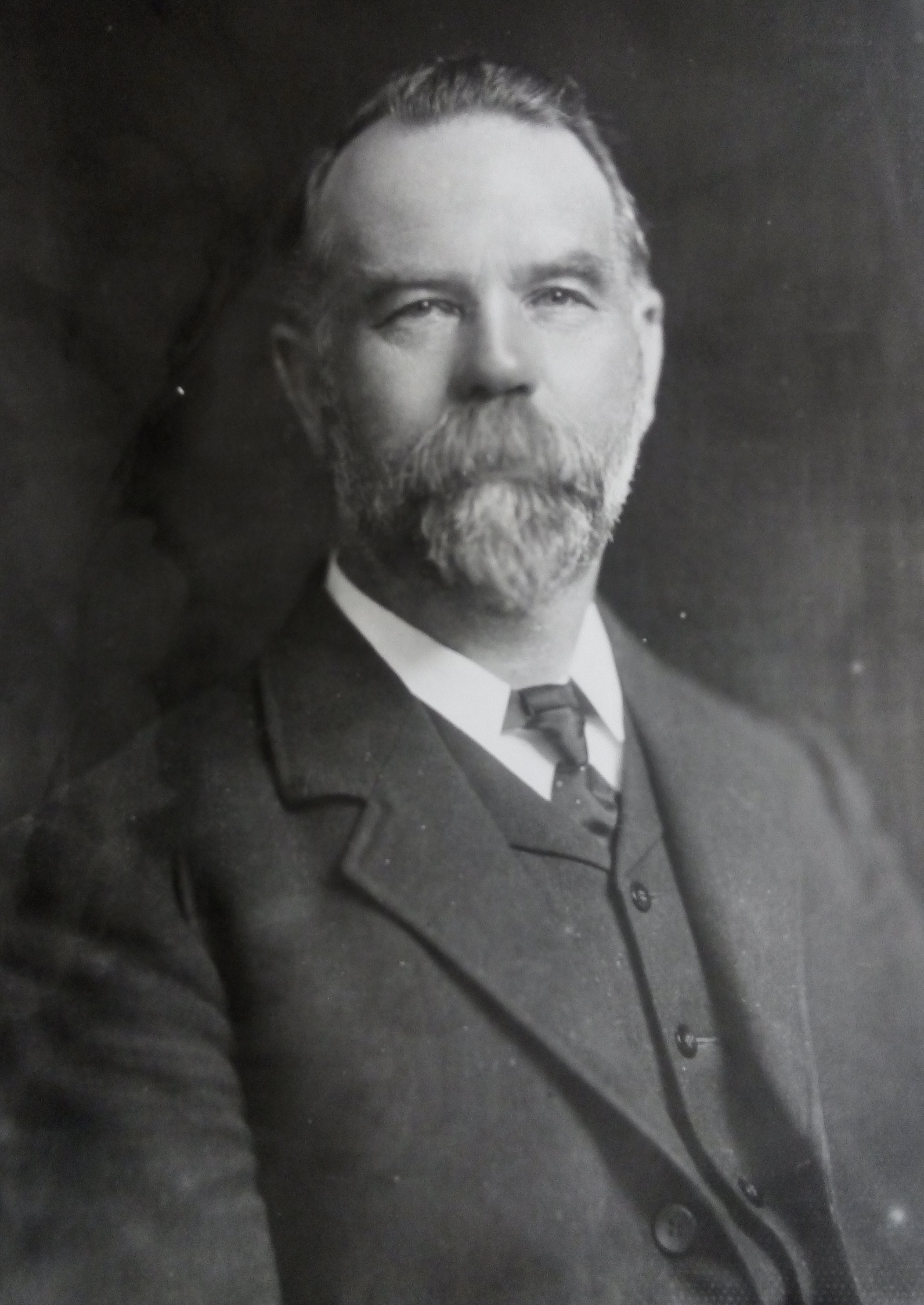

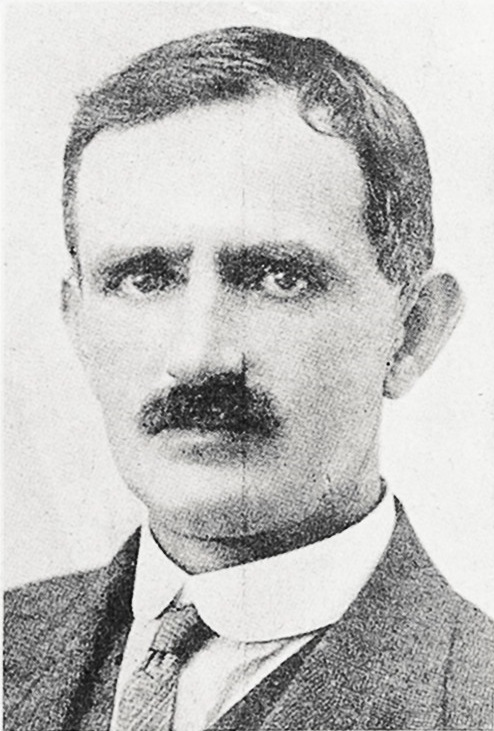

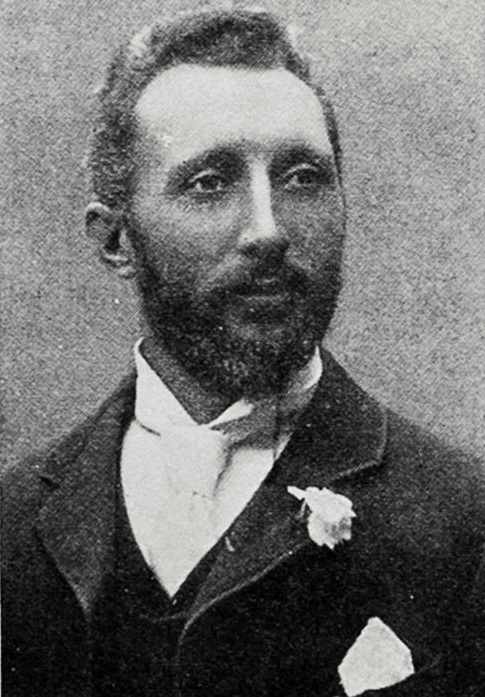
Candidate	John Luke	John Read	William Barber
Party	Citizens League	Labour	Independent
Popular vote	7,361	6,376	3,553
Percentage	42.57	36.87	20.54
Mayor before election
John Luke
Elected mayor
John Luke

The 1919 Wellington mayoral election was part of the New Zealand local elections held that same year. In 1919, elections were held for the Mayor of Wellington plus other local government positions including fifteen city councillors. The incumbent Mayor John Luke retained office for a fourth consecutive term. The polling was conducted using the standard first-past-the-post electoral method.

== Mayoralty results ==
1919 Wellington mayoral election
Party	Candidate	Votes	%	±%
Citizens League	John Luke	7,361	42.57	
Labour	John Read	6,376	36.87	
Independent	William Barber	3,553	20.54	
Majority		985	5.69	
Turnout		17,290	54.11	

== Councillor results ==
1919 Wellington City Council election
Party	Candidate	Votes	%	±%
Citizens League	Robert Wright	7,892	57.22	−11.87
Citizens League	Charles Norwood	7,468	54.14	+2.98
Citizens League	Len McKenzie	7,264	52.66	−11.26
Citizens League	Martin Luckie	7,179	52.05	−9.32
Labour	John Hutchison	7,100	51.47	+6.70
Citizens League	John Shorland	6,745	48.90	−2.82
Citizens League	William Bennett	6,684	48.46	−10.67
Citizens League	Arthur Atkinson	6,544	47.44	−19.42
Independent	George Frost	6,525	47.31	−25.59
Labour	Peter Fraser	6,509	47.19	
Independent	James Dale	6,242	45.25	
Labour	Charles Chapman	6,239	45.23	+7.22
Citizens League	Thomas Forsyth	6,093	44.17	
Citizens League	William Thompson	6,054	43.89	−3.74
Labour	John Glover	5,697	41.30	+2.00
Citizens League	Frank Meadowcroft	5,693	41.27	
Citizens League	Henry Bennett	5,604	40.63	
Labour	Tom Brindle	5,483	39.75	
Citizens League	William Hildreth	5,440	39.44	−10.08
Labour	Jessie Aitken	5,400	39.15	
Citizens League	William Gaudin	5,374	38.96	
Independent	Frederick Manton	5,316	38.54	
Labour	Alexander Croskery	5,299	38.42	
Labour	Alec Monteith	5,165	37.44	
Labour	Fred Evans	5,107	37.02	
Citizens League	Sidney Nathan	4,964	35.99	
Citizens League	Bert Royle	4,935	35.78	
Labour	Sarah Beck	4,904	35.55	
Labour	Herbert Swindell	4,588	33.26	
Labour	Sarah Snow	4,511	32.70	
Labour	Robert McKeen	4,446	32.23	
Labour	William McArley	4,422	32.06	
Labour	Bob Stickney	4,264	30.91	
Independent	Edward Righton	4,253	30.83	
Independent	John Fitzgerald	4,155	30.12	−18.30
Independent	Maud Gibbons	3,509	25.44	
Independent	Jane Donaldson	2,155	15.62	
Independent	James Clark	2,122	15.38	
Independent	Andrew Hornblow	1,716	12.44	
Independent	Charles Mackintosh	1,665	12.07	
Independent	William Edwards	1,564	11.33	
