= Michael Joseph Savage =

Prime Minister of New Zealand from 1935 to 1940

The Right Honourable Michael Joseph Savage PC
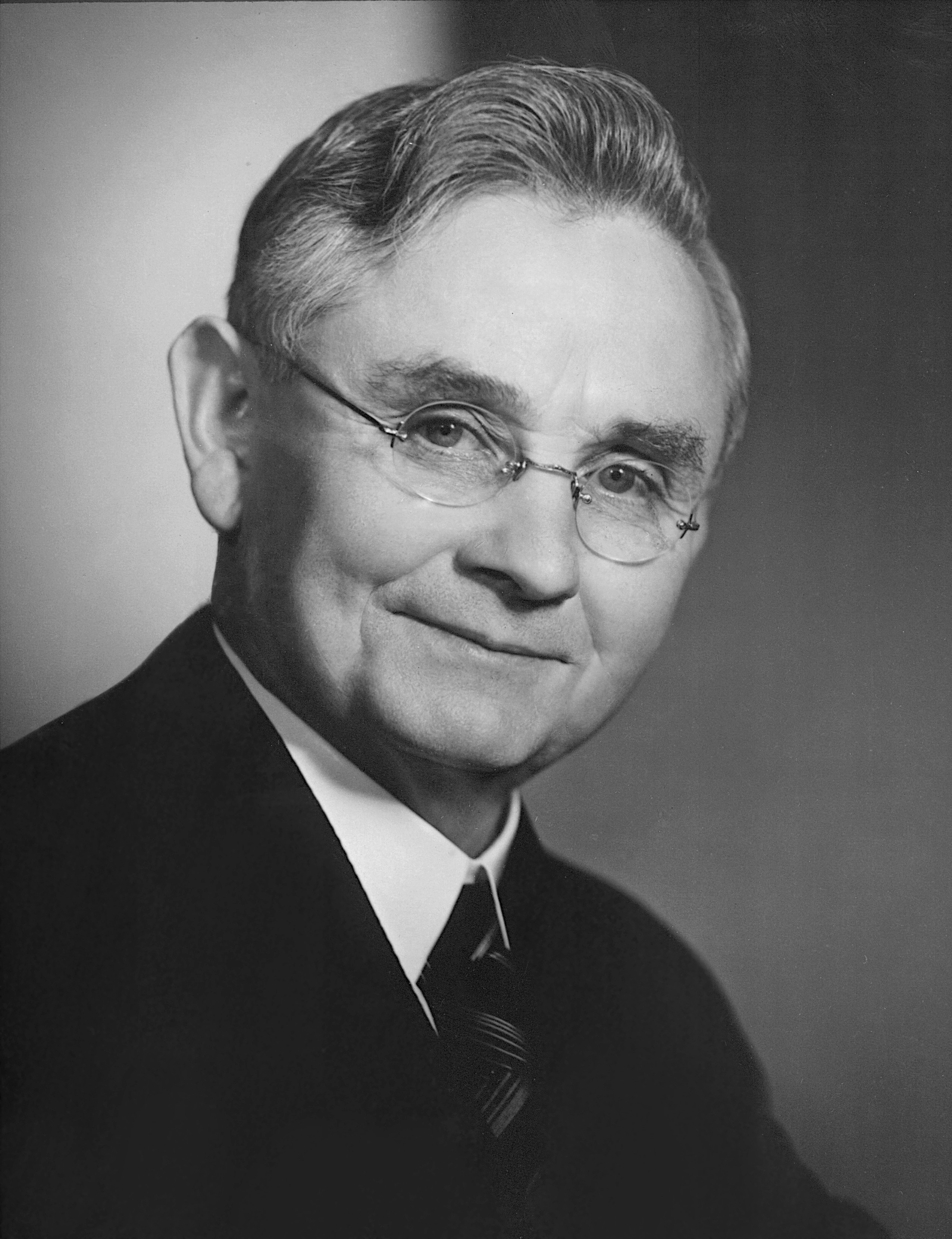
- Savage in 1935

23rd Prime Minister of New Zealand
- In office 6 December 1935 – 27 March 1940
- Monarchs: George V Edward VIII; George VI
- Governor-General: The Viscount Galway
- Preceded by: George Forbes
- Succeeded by: Peter Fraser

3rd Leader of the New Zealand Labour Party
- In office 12 October 1933 – 27 March 1940
- Deputy: Peter Fraser
- Preceded by: Harry Holland
- Succeeded by: Peter Fraser

12th Leader of the Opposition
- In office 12 October 1933 – 6 December 1935
- Preceded by: Harry Holland
- Succeeded by: George Forbes

Member of the New Zealand Parliament for Auckland West
- In office 17 December 1919 – 27 March 1940
- Preceded by: Charles Poole
- Succeeded by: Peter Carr

Personal details
- Born: Michael Savage; 23 March 1872 Tatong, Victoria, Australia
- Died: 27 March 1940 (aged 68) Wellington, New Zealand
- Resting place: Bastion Point, Waitematā Harbour, Auckland
- Party: Labour (1916–40); Social Democratic (1913–16); Socialist (1907–13)
- Occupation: Trade unionist; politician
- Savage's voice A radio address by Michael Joseph Savage at the outbreak of World War II, made from his home in Wellington. Recorded 5 September 1939

Michael Joseph Savage (23 March 1872 – 27 March 1940) was an Australian-born New Zealand politician who served as the 23rd prime minister of New Zealand, heading the First Labour Government from 1935 until his death in 1940.

Savage was born in the Colony of Victoria (present-day Australia), and emigrated to New Zealand in 1907 at the age of 35. A labourer, he became a trade unionist, and in 1910 was elected president of the Auckland Trades and Labour Council. Savage supported the formation of the New Zealand Labour Party in July 1916. He was active in local politics before his election to the House of Representatives in 1919, as one of eight Labour members returned in that election. Savage was elected unopposed as Labour Party leader in 1933.

Savage led the Labour Party to its first ever electoral victory in the 1935 election. He won public support for his government's economic recovery policies and social welfare programme. His popularity assured the Labour Party of an even more significant electoral victory in the 1938 election. His government joined Britain in declaring war against Germany in 1939. Savage's health declined rapidly after Labour's second electoral victory and he died in office. He was succeeded as head of government by his deputy Peter Fraser.

Savage saw himself as spokesman on behalf of his entire party and worked to keep its multiple factions in harness, although a left-wing critic of his leadership, John A. Lee, was expelled. Commonly known as the architect of the New Zealand welfare state, Savage is generally regarded by academics and the general public as one of New Zealand's greatest and most revered prime ministers. To date he is the only New Zealand prime minister or premier to serve under three monarchs: George V, Edward VIII and George VI, owing to Edward's abdication in 1936.

== Early life ==
Born as Michael Savage in Tatong, Victoria, Australia, he was the youngest of eight children of Irish immigrant parents. His father, Richard Savage, was a native of Dundrum, County Down and his mother Johanna Savage (née Hayes) was from Limerick. Both migrated to Australia in the 1850s to escape the Irish Famine. He received a Roman Catholic upbringing from his sister Rose, after his mother died when he was aged five. He spent five years attending a state school at Rothesay, the same town as his father's farm. From 1886, aged 14, to 1893 Savage worked at a wine and spirits shop in Benalla. Savage also attended evening classes at Benalla College at this time. Although short in stature, Savage had enormous physical strength and made a name as both a boxer and weightlifter while enjoying dancing and many other sports.

In 1891 Savage was devastated by the deaths of both his sister Rose and his closest brother Joe. He adopted Joe's name and became known as Michael Joseph Savage from then on. After losing his job in 1893, Savage moved to New South Wales, finding work as a labourer and irrigation ditch-digger in Narrandera for seven years. Whilst there, he joined the General Labourers' Union and became familiar with the radical political theories of the Americans Henry George and Edward Bellamy, who influenced his political policies in later life.

Savage moved back to Victoria in 1900, working a number of jobs. He became active in the Political Labor Council of Victoria, and in 1907 he was chosen as the PLC's candidate to stand for the Wangaratta electorate. Savage had to pull out after the party was not able to fund his deposit and campaign costs, and John Thomas stood instead. He remained an active party member and became a close friend of PLC member Paddy Webb, with whom he was closely linked in later years.

== Arrival in New Zealand ==
After a farewell function in Rutherglen, Savage emigrated to New Zealand in 1907. He arrived in Wellington on 9 October, which happened to be Labour Day. There he worked in a variety of jobs, as a miner, flax-cutter and storeman, before becoming involved in the union movement. Despite initially intending to join Webb on the West Coast, he decided to move north, arriving in Auckland in 1908.

He soon found board there with Alf and Elizabeth French and their two children. Alf had come to New Zealand in 1894 on the ship Wairarapa, which was wrecked on Great Barrier Island, and had helped in the rescue of a girl. Savage, who never married, lived with the French family until 1939, when he moved to the house Hill Haven, 64–66 Harbour View Road, Northland, Wellington, subsequently used by his successor as Prime Minister, Peter Fraser, until 1949. After arriving in Auckland he found employment at Hancock and Co., a brewery. The brewery was owned by a Jewish family who hired irrespective of workers faith helping Savage overcome the anti-Irish Catholic sentiments that were prevalent in much of Auckland at the time. Soon after beginning work he joined the Auckland Brewers', Wine and Spirit Merchants' and Aerated Water Employees' Union and quickly became president of the 154 member union. He was the delegate of the union to the Auckland Trades Council and in 1910 he was elected president of the trades council.

== Early political career ==
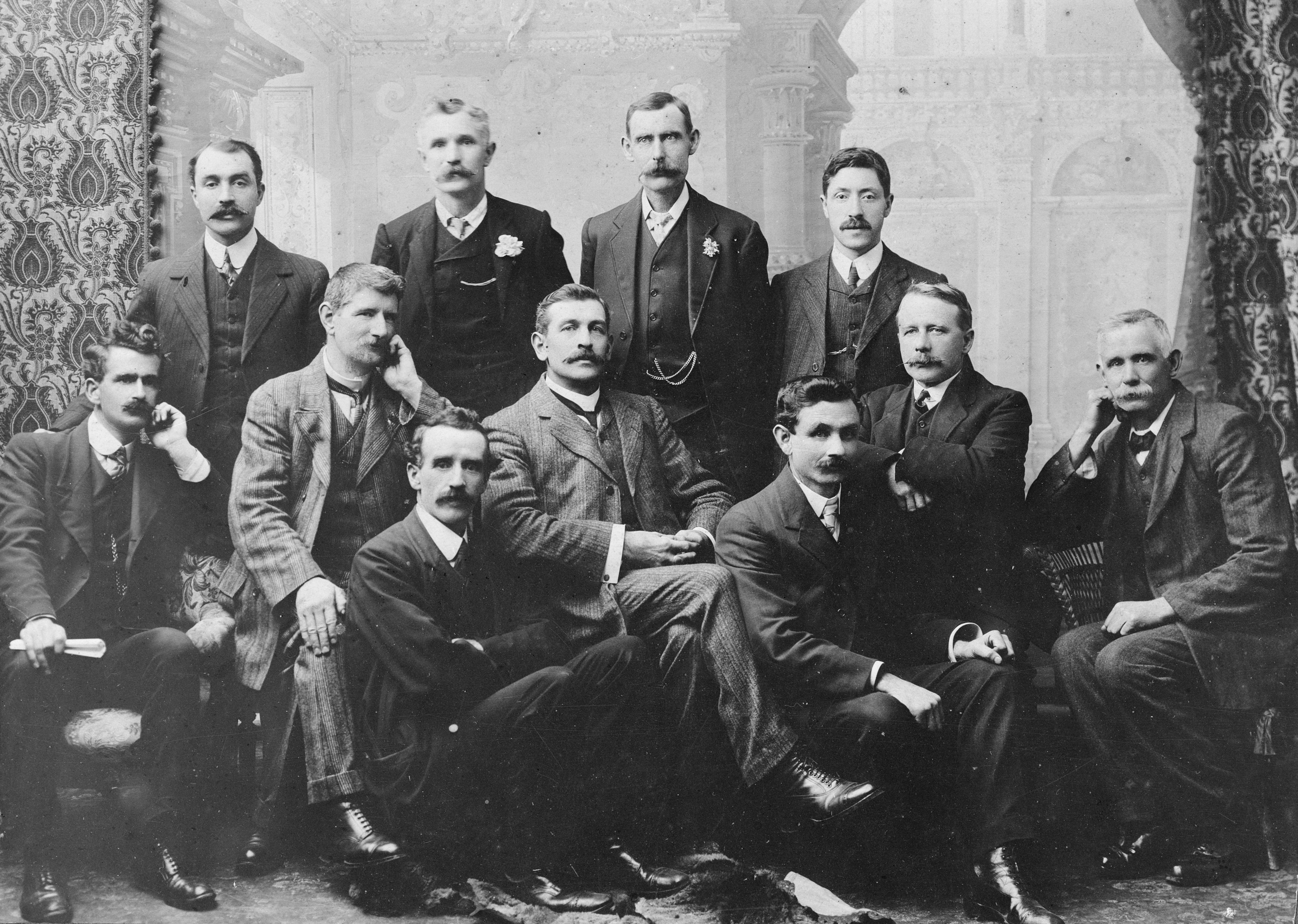
Savage (right, front row) at the Socialist Party's 1911 conference

Savage at first opposed the formation of the original New Zealand Labour Party as he viewed the grouping as insufficiently socialistic. Instead he became the chairman of the New Zealand Federation of Labour, known as the "Red Feds". There, he assisted with organising meetings and group sessions and helped to distribute their socialist newspaper, the Maoriland Worker.

=== Socialist origins ===
In the 1911 and 1914 general election campaigns, Savage unsuccessfully stood as the Socialist candidate for Auckland Central, coming second each time to Albert Glover of the Liberal Party. During this time Savage was also involved in local union groups, becoming president of the Auckland Brewers', Wine and Spirit Merchants' and Aerated-water Employees' Union, president of the Auckland Trades and Labour Council, the Auckland organiser for the Social Democratic Party and supported striking miners at Waihi. During the First World War he opposed conscription, arguing "that the conscription of wealth should precede the conscription of men". Savage's opposition to conscription was not absolute, rather based on balance. Indeed, he complied with a conscription order and entered a training camp in 1918, aged 46.

Savage openly supported the formation of a unified New Zealand Labour Party in July 1916, and became its national vice-president in 1918 and later the first permanent national secretary the next year. In 1919 Savage was elected as a Labour candidate to both the Auckland City Council and the Auckland Hospital and Charitable Aid Board in local body elections. He served on the Charitable Aid Board until 1922 and as a councillor until 1923 but was re-elected to the Charitable Aid Board in 1927, remaining in office until 1935.

=== Member of Parliament ===
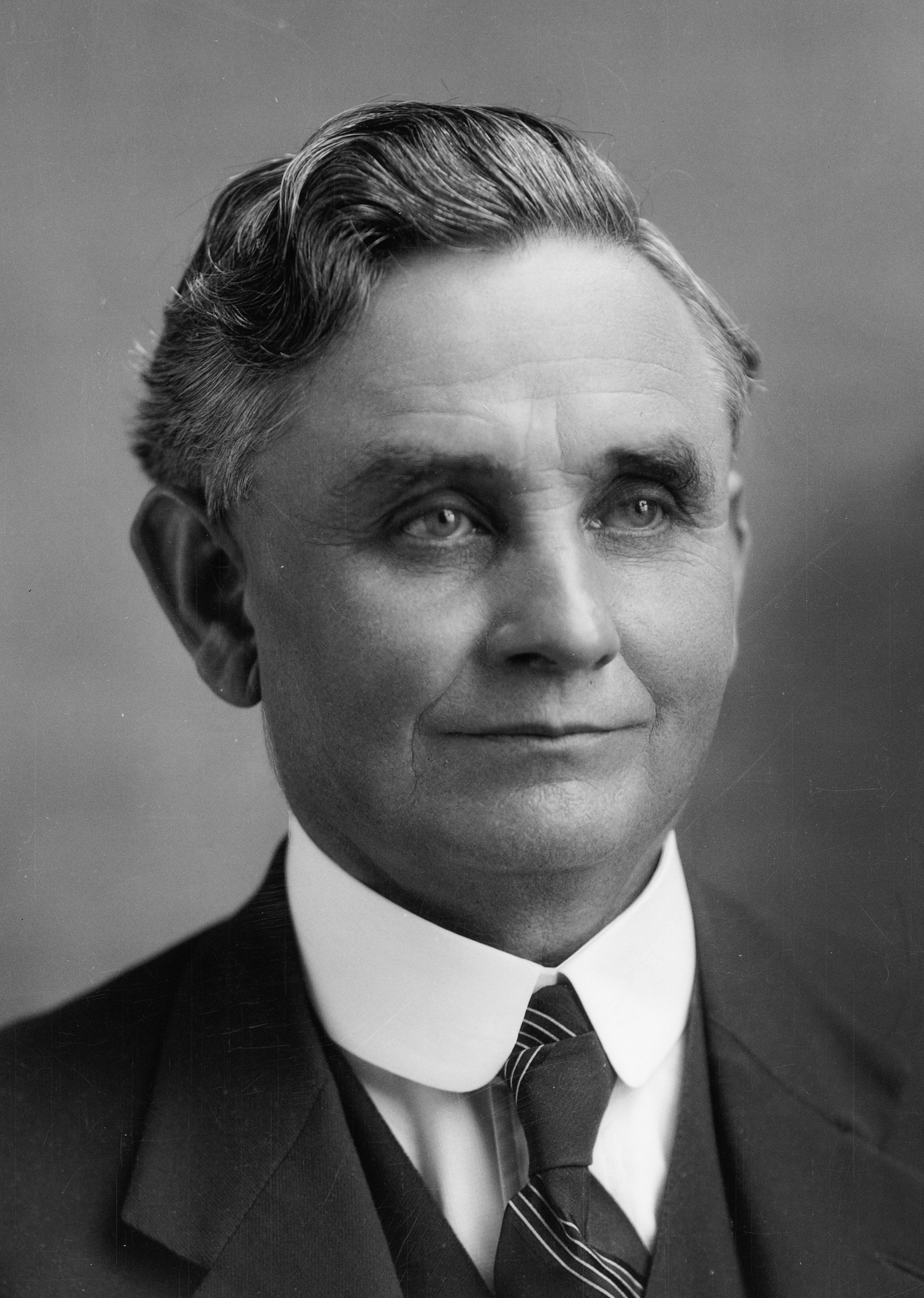
Savage in the 1920s

New Zealand Parliament
Years	Term	Electorate	Party
1919–1922	20th	Auckland West	Labour
1922–1925	21st	Auckland West	Labour
1925–1928	22nd	Auckland West	Labour
1928–1931	23rd	Auckland West	Labour
1931–1935	24th	Auckland West	Labour
1935–1938	25th	Auckland West	Labour
1938–1940	26th	Auckland West	Labour

As the war came to an end, the voters of the Auckland West electorate put Savage into Parliament as a Labour member in the 1919 general election, an electorate that he held until his death. He became one of eight Labour members of parliament. He formally became the party's deputy-leader after the 1922 election, defeating Dan Sullivan eleven votes to six. Assuming an ever-increasing workload, he had resigned as Labour's national secretary and Auckland Labour Representation Committee secretary in July 1920.

For most of the 1920s Savage sought to expand Labour's support beyond urban unionists and travelled frequently to rural areas. He became the leading advocate for increases to pensions and universally free health care. He is credited for the creation of the Family Allowances Act 1926, which the governing Reform Party openly commented that it had modelled the legislation on three earlier defeated bills introduced by Savage. In 1927 Savage and several others persuaded the party to amend its land policy and recognise the right of freehold which was essential in gaining rural support for Labour. In doing so, Savage furthered perceptions that he was a more practical politician than then Labour leader Harry Holland. In October 1933 Holland died suddenly and Savage took his place becoming Labour's third party Leader.

Savage later helped to engineer an alliance between Labour and the Rātana Church, which was gaining a large Māori following in the 1930s. When T .W. Rātana entered politics he allied himself with the Labour Party, which had consulted with his followers over Māori policy. The pact was formalised in a 1936 meeting between Rātana and Savage.

In 1935, Savage was awarded the King George V Silver Jubilee Medal.

== Prime minister ==
=== Rise to power and 1935 election ===
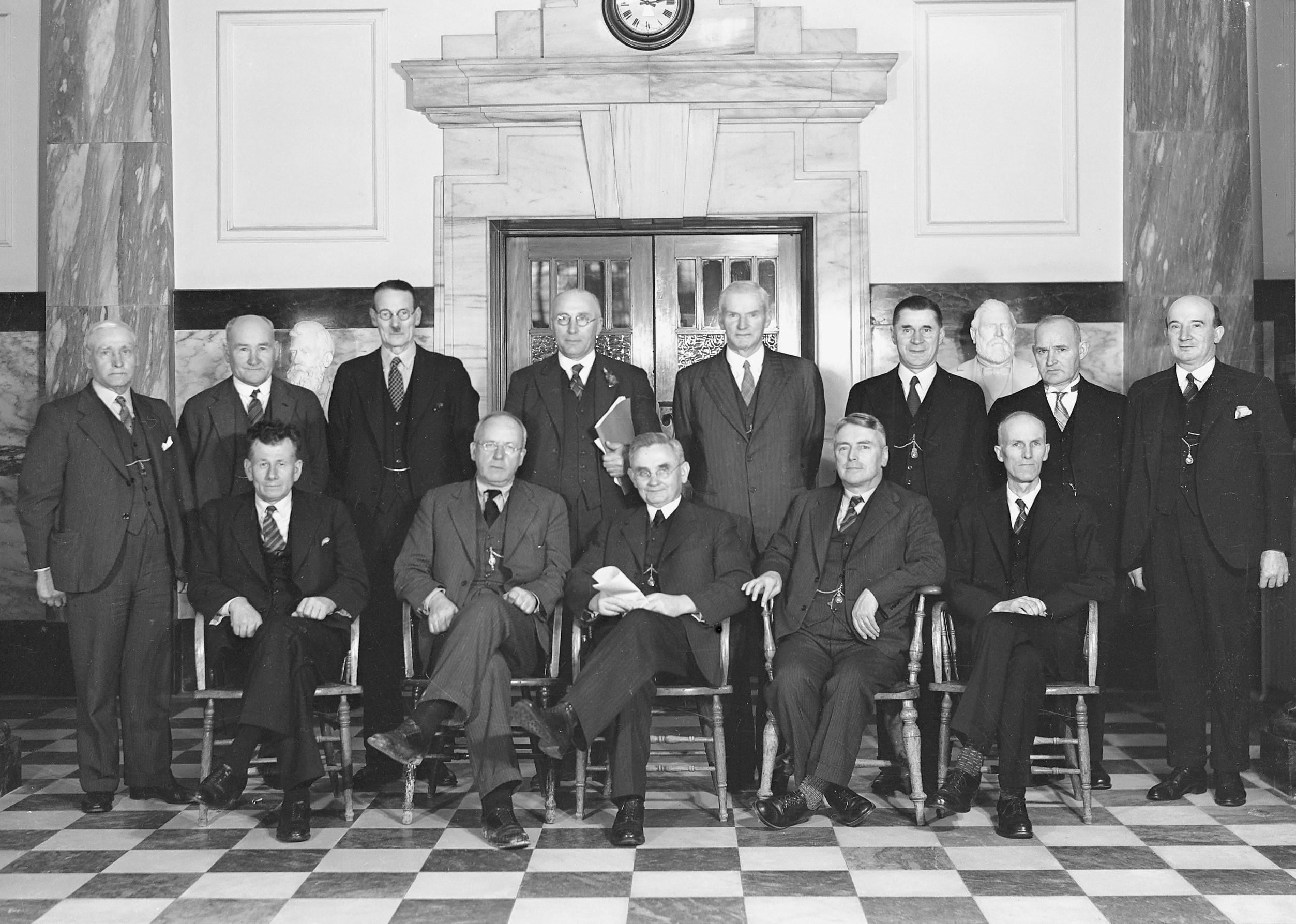
Savage and his ministers in the first Labour Cabinet, photographed in the Old Parliament Building, c. 1935

During the depression, Savage toured the country, and became an iconic figure. An excellent speaker, he became the most visible politician in the land, and led Labour to victory in the 1935 election. Along with the Premiership, he appointed himself to the posts of Minister of External Affairs and Minister of Native Affairs. In 1936 the Weekly News featured Spencer Digby's full page iconic photograph of Savage which was often to be seen framed in many New Zealand homes through the following years. Soon after its election the government gave a "Christmas bonus" of £270,000 to the unemployed and needy. Savage's government also restored wage cuts, expanded pensions, guaranteed farmers' prices, and revalued the currency.

=== Major social and economic legislation ===
In 1936 the government decided that broadcasting would be run by the state. As a result, a government minister in charge of Broadcasting was appointed and new legislation (the Broadcasting Act 1936) was passed that abolished the existing New Zealand Broadcasting Board and established the new National Broadcasting Service in its place. A Director of Broadcasting was appointed and a Broadcasting Advisory Council formed as a result of the act to advise the minister. The Labour Party had specifically sought to broadcast parliamentary debates via radio as a means of allowing the public to listen and make their own judgment of events, rather than relying solely on reporting the press, whom Labour were distrustful of. Savage appointed himself as the inaugural minister.

In 1936 the government instituted major reform to industrial relations legislation. The Industrial Conciliation and Arbitration Act established a statutory minimum wage, standardised the 40-hour week and made union membership compulsory. It also restored the power of the Arbitration Court and required the court to factor in the needs of wives and dependent children of workers when making general wage orders. The Court of Arbitration was required (as noted by one study) “to stipulate in its awards and agreements a basic wage sufficient to maintain a man, his wife and three children in a fair and reasonable standard of comfort.” Also in 1936, the Factory Act was amended, with a 40-hour workweek introduced together with 8 public holidays. Several other laws affecting working conditions were carried out during the course of Savage's premiership, together with reforms in other areas.

In 1936, for instance, free secondary education was made available up until the age of 19, and a county library service was established. The Fair Rents Act of 1936 introduced regulations on certain rent categories, while the Pension Amendment Act of 1936 made pensions available for deserted wives and invalids. A guaranteed price for cheese and butter exports was provided under the Primary Products Marketing Act, while the Mortgagors and Lessees Rehabilitation Act of 1936 provided assistance to those who (as noted by one study) “were at risk of losing their assets because of mortgage default.” In 1937 a state rental housing scheme was launched, while that same year free milk in primary schools was introduced.

While unemployment was consistently reducing the cabinet continued to spend for unemployment relief. To find a more permanent solution to the unemployment situation the government was promoting the development of secondary industries. Likewise the government announced in May 1936 a three-year public works programme. This not only provided relief work for the unemployed but also restarted the Public Works Department original function as the development arm of the state. Additionally, all relief workers were placed on standard £4 a week rate of pay.

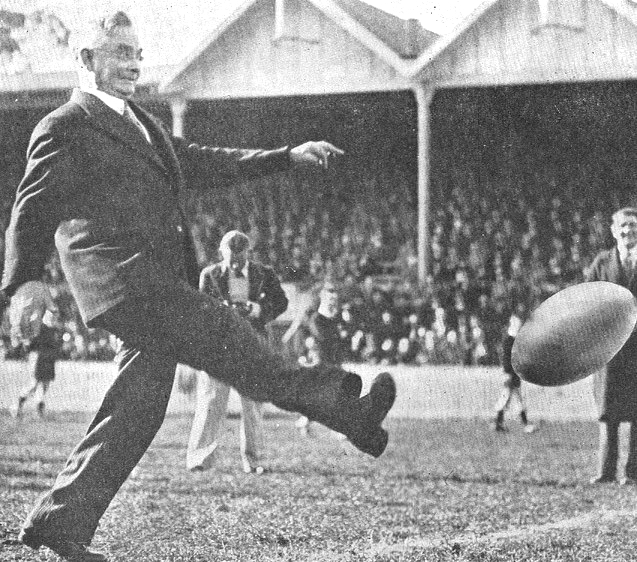
Savage demonstrates his common touch, attending a rugby league match between New Zealand and Australia at Auckland, 1937

In April 1938 Savage and his Finance Minister, Walter Nash, began planning Labour's proposals on social security, in-line with their 1935 election promises. Responding to a suggestion from the Reverend W. H. A. Vickery, mayor of Kaiapoi, Savage began to use the term "applied Christianity" to describe the government's scheme.

The Social Security Bill put forward by the government boasted an unemployment benefit payable to people 16 years and over; a universal free health system extending to general practitioners, public hospitals and maternity care; a means-tested old-age pension of 30 shillings a week for men and women at age 60; and universal superannuation from age 65. The social security scheme was a collaborative effort, with the detailed negotiations and drafting of the legislation carried out by committees of MPs and public servants. However, Savage's personal involvement was pivotal, as he decided on the basic scheme, helped resolve deep divisions of opinion within the Labour caucus over principles and detail, made many of the major public pronouncements and guarantees, and astutely responded to opposition from the Treasury, the New Zealand branch of the British Medical Association, and the National Party. It was also Savage who insisted that the Act contain a provision that it would not come into force until 1 April 1939, thereby giving National the opportunity to revoke it if they won the 1938 general election. The First Labour Government proved popular and easily won the election, with an increased popular mandate. The Social Security Act was eventually passed. The following year, emergency benefits were introduced in hardship cases.

=== International relations ===
During the 1936 abdication crisis, Savage engaged in diplomatic correspondence with the British Prime Minister, Stanley Baldwin. He expressed his reservations regarding the necessity of King Edward VIII's abdication in light of Edward's intention to marry Wallis Simpson, a divorcée. Savage had never even heard of Simpson before the crisis arose. He supported one proposal put forward by the British government that the couple could marry and Simpson would hold a courtesy title rather than becoming Queen. Nevertheless, Savage stated that he would "be guided by the decision of the Home [British] government".

Savage sailed to Britain in 1937 to attend the coronation of King George VI, as well as the concurrent Imperial Conference. While in London, Savage differentiated himself from the other Commonwealth prime ministers when he openly criticised Britain for weakening the League of Nations, and argued that the dominions were not consulted with properly on foreign policy and defence issues. Savage's government (unlike Britain) was quick to condemn German rearmament, Japanese expansion in China and Italy's conquest of Abyssinia. Savage criticised Britain's appeasement policies at the conference, saying "Is your policy peace at any price; if it is so I cannot accept it". Anthony Eden replied "No, not at any price, but peace at almost any price", to which Savage replied: "You can pay too high a price even for peace". Britain, Australia, Canada and the opposition National Party were critical of Savage for his stance.

=== Lee affair ===
Following the 1938 election, at the first Labour caucus on 3 November, Labour under-secretary John A. Lee, a critic of Savage who was bitter about being excluded from the cabinet, attempted a caucus revolt. He moved a proposal that caucus elect a new cabinet rather than endorse either the existing one or one nominated by Savage. After a bitter debate amongst MPs the proposal was successful 26 votes to 23. However, Savage over-ruled the vote and proceeded to inform the press that cabinet would remain unchanged. In December 1938 the infamous "Lee Letter" appeared. It contained many attacks on the financial orthodoxy and over-cautiousness of the Labour leadership. It received wide publicity and led many in the public to question Labour's unanimity. Lee was eventually expelled from the party by the annual conference.

=== Second World War ===
Savage led the country into the Second World War, officially declaring war on Nazi Germany on 3 September 1939, just hours after Britain. Unlike Australia, which felt obligated to declare war as it had not yet ratified the Statute of Westminster, New Zealand declared war as a sign of allegiance to Britain and in recognition of Britain abandoning its former policy of appeasement, a policy that New Zealand had opposed. This led to Prime Minister Savage declaring (from his sick bed) two days later:

Both with gratitude for the past and confidence in the future, we range ourselves without fear beside Britain. Where she goes, we go. Where she stands, we stand. We are only a small and young nation, but we are one and all a band of brothers and we march forward with union of hearts and wills to a common destiny.

== Death and commemoration ==
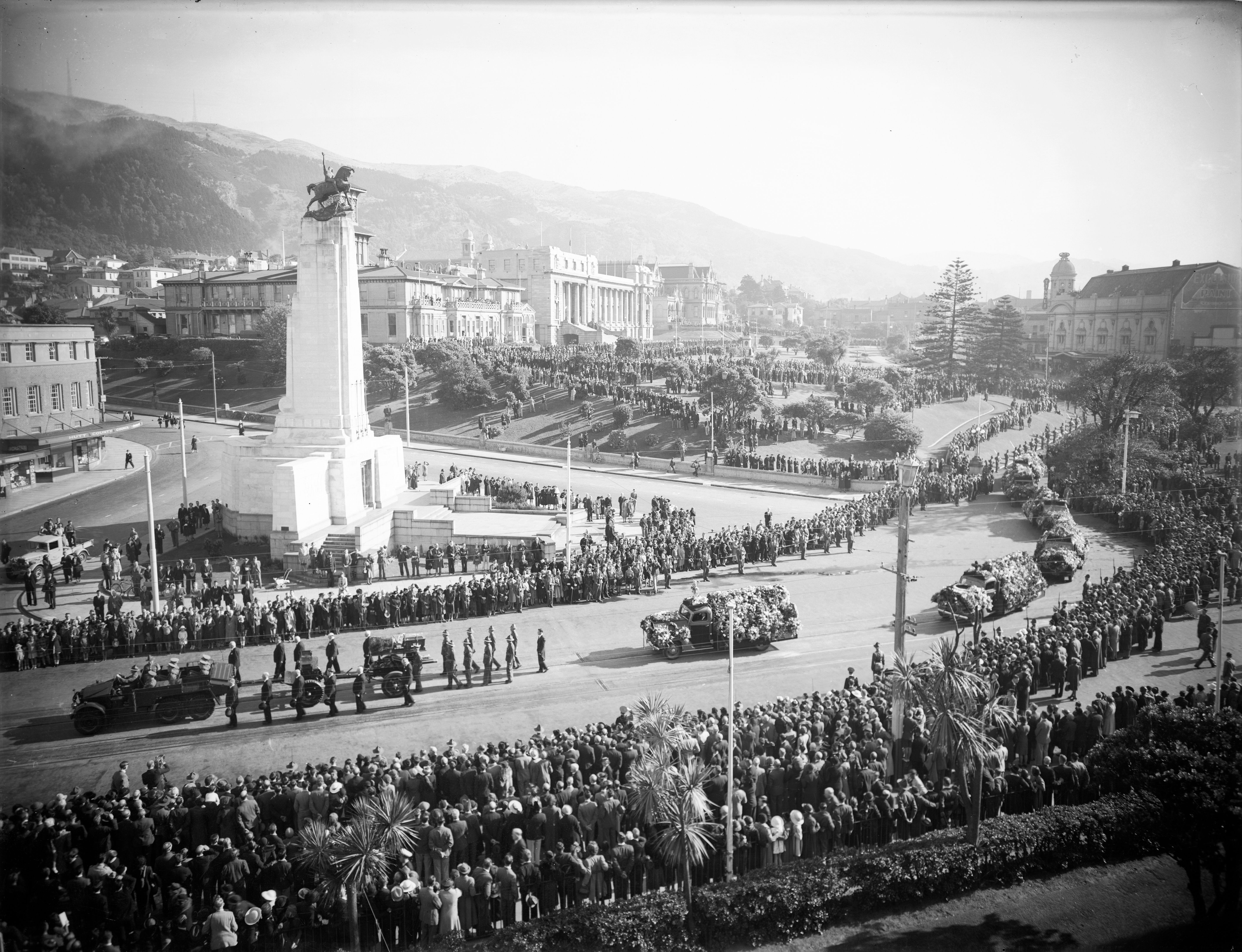
The state funeral procession for Michael Joseph Savage, 30 April 1940

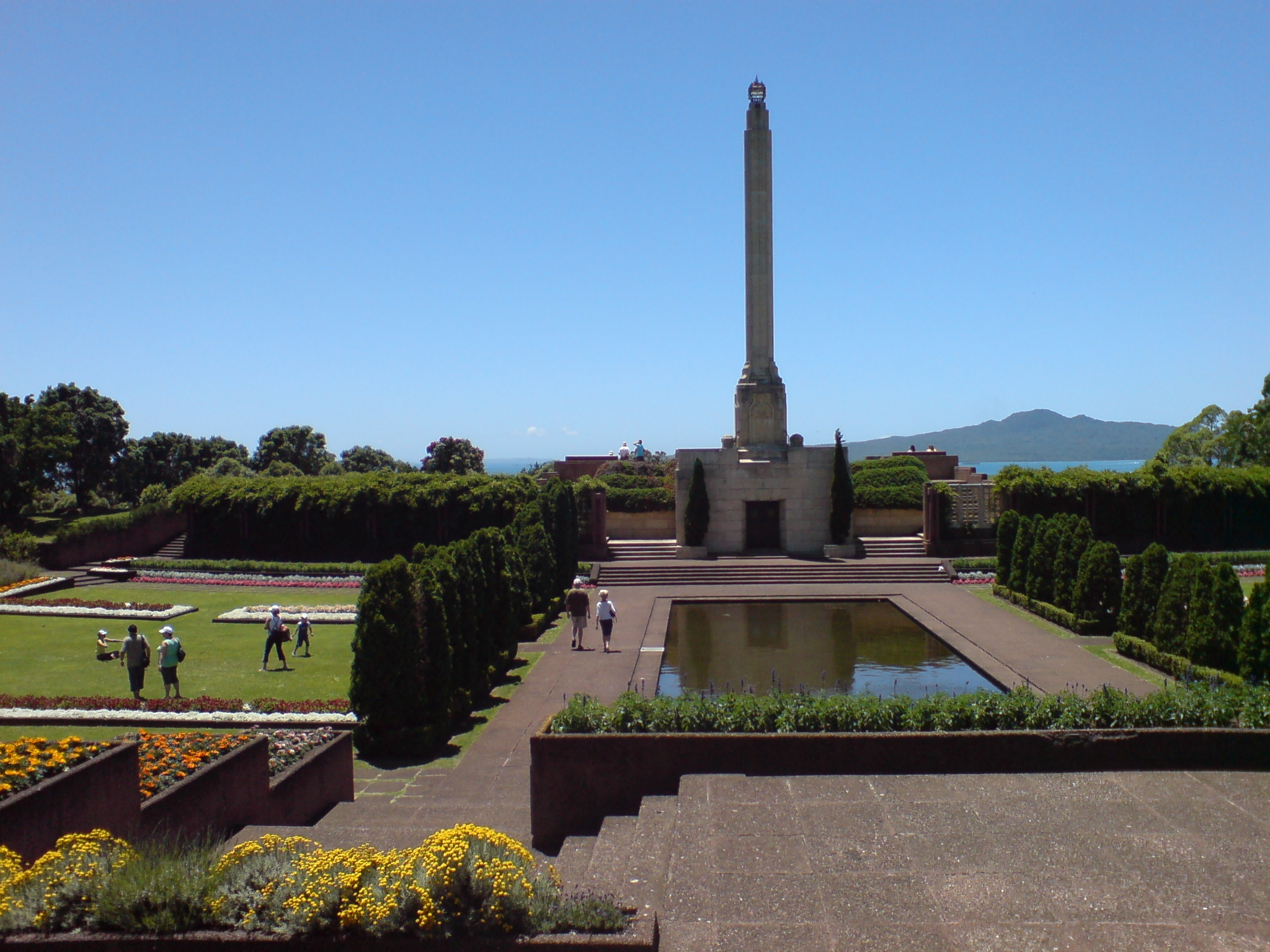
Grave and memorial at Bastion Point

Suffering from cancer of the colon at the time of the 1938 election, Savage had delayed seeking treatment to participate in the election campaign. In late 1939, John A. Lee was censured for his comment that Savage was "mentally as well as physically ill". Savage died from cancer on 27 March 1940, although the terminal nature of his illness was still being denied at the beginning of March.

Savage brought an almost religious fervour to his politics. This, and his death while in office, has made him become something of an iconic figure to the Left. Lauded for his welfare policies, Savage's picture reportedly hung in many Labour supporters' homes. His popularity amongst the voting population was so celebrated that he is said to have remarked in disbelief to Lee that, "They [the people] think I am God" after Labour's re-election in 1938. Savage returned to his Catholic roots shortly before he died.

His state funeral on 30 April 1940 included a Requiem Mass celebrated at the Basilica of the Sacred Heart, Hill St, Wellington before his body was taken amidst general and public mourning by train to Auckland, with frequent halts to allow local people and dignitaries to pay their last respects; the journey was carried live on the radio. The mournful funeral music and speeches was lightened on arrival in Auckland when the announcer intoned reverently "Sir Ernest Davis is passing round the bier"; Davis, the Auckland mayor, was a wealthy brewer.

He was interred initially in a temporarily adapted harbour defence gun installation. He was soon after removed to a side chapel of St Patrick's Cathedral in Auckland, while a national competition was announced, decided, and the winning design of the monumental tomb and memorial gardens at Bastion Point constructed, forming his permanent resting site.

Savage lies buried at Bastion Point on Auckland's Waitematā Harbour waterfront in the Savage Memorial, a clifftop mausoleum crowned by a tall minaret, and fronted by an extensive memorial garden and reflecting pool. Savage's body is interred in a vertical shaft below the sarcophagus. In February 1941, a competition was run by the New Zealand Government for the design of the mausoleum, won by Auckland architects Tibor Donner and Anthony Bartlett. Work begun on the memorial in June 1941, which was completed by March 1942 and officially opened in March 1943.

== Legacy ==
Michael Joseph Savage is admired from many sides of the political spectrum and is known as the architect of the New Zealand welfare state. His Labour government provided the foundations of the post-war consensus, based upon the assumption that full employment would be maintained by Keynesian policies and that a greatly enlarged system of social services would be created.

He is considered by academics and historians to be one of New Zealand's greatest and most revered prime ministers. Savage's genial personality led to him often being called "everybody's uncle", which along with his skills as an orator was largely responsible for public acceptance of his government's radical policies. Exemplifying his enthusiasm for his government's policies, Savage personally assisted a family in Fife Lane, Miramar, Wellington, to move their furniture into the first of the government's 1930s state houses.

The iconic 1935 portrait of Savage was hung in many New Zealand homes in the 1930s and 1940s, and previous prime minister Jacinda Ardern had a framed copy in her Beehive office. In December 2020, the original negative of the portrait was discovered in Te Papa's collections.

Savage served as patron of the New Zealand Rugby League.

Savage was awarded the title of "New Zealander of the Century" by The New Zealand Herald in 1999.

== See also ==
- Electoral history of Michael Joseph Savage
- List of New Zealand ministries
- Politics of New Zealand
- Socialism in New Zealand
- List of members of the New Zealand Parliament who died in office

== Notes ==
New Zealand Parliament
Preceded by Charles Poole	Member of Parliament for Auckland West; 1919–1940	Succeeded by Peter Carr
Political offices
Preceded by Harry Holland	Leader of the Opposition; 1933–1935	Succeeded by George Forbes
Preceded by George Forbes	Minister of Foreign Affairs; 1935–1940	Succeeded by Frank Langstone
Preceded by George Forbes	Minister of Native Affairs; 1935–1940	Succeeded by Frank Langstone
Preceded by George Forbes	Prime Minister of New Zealand; 1935–1940	Succeeded by Peter Fraser
New title	Minister of Broadcasting; 1936–1940	Succeeded by Peter Fraser
Party political offices
Preceded by John Glover	Secretary of the New Zealand Labour Party; 1919–1920	Succeeded by Moses Ayrton
Preceded by James McCombs	Deputy Leader of the Labour Party; 1923–1933	Succeeded by Peter Fraser
Preceded by Harry Holland	Leader of the New Zealand Labour Party; 1933–1940	Succeeded by Peter Fraser
