= Tregear =

Tregear may refer to:

== People ==
- Chelsey Tregear (1983–), Australian netball player
- Edward Tregear (1846–1931), New Zealand public servant
- G.S. Tregear (1802–1841), English caricaturist
- Mary Tregear (1924–2010), British art historian
- Peter Tregear (1970–), Australian musicologist, author and performer

== Places ==
- Mount Tregear, New Zealand
- Tregear, Cornwall, England
- Tregear, New South Wales, Australia
