= John Glover (New Zealand politician) =

New Zealand politician and trade unionist

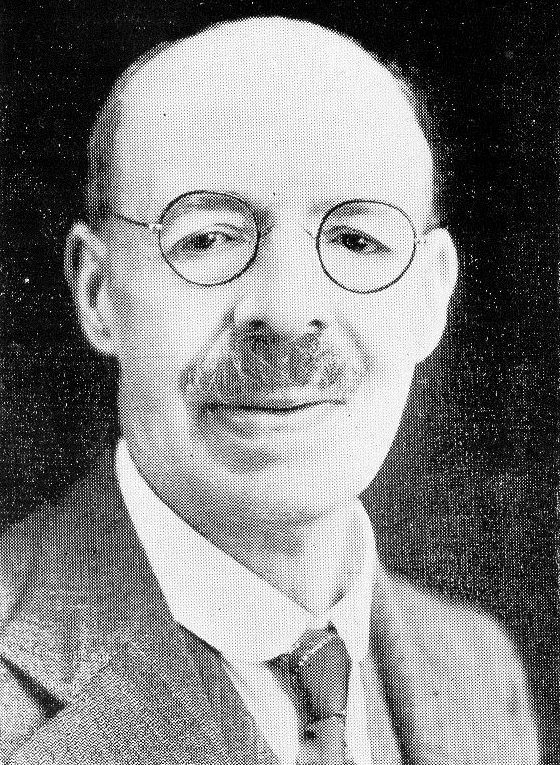

17th Chairman of the Wellington Hospital Board
- In office 25 June 1936 – 27 June 1940
- Preceded by: Fred Castle
- Succeeded by: Fred Castle

Member of the Wellington Hospital Board
- In office 1 May 1929 – 17 May 1941
- In office 30 April 1919 – 27 April 1923
- Constituency: Wellington City

Member of the Wellington City Council
- In office 22 July 1926 – 3 May 1927
- Preceded by: Alec Monteith
- In office 30 April 1919 – 27 April 1921
- Constituency: At-large

Personal details
- Born: 1866 North Staffordshire, England
- Died: 2 June 1947 (aged 80–81) Silverstream, New Zealand
- Party: Labour Party
- Other political affiliations: United Labour; Social Democratic
- Profession: Miner

John Glover (1866 – 2 June 1947) was a New Zealand politician and trade unionist. He was an organiser and candidate for the United Labour, Social Democratic Party then the Labour Party serving time in local government.

== Early life ==
Glover was born in 1866 in North Staffordshire. He spent his early years working as a miner before moving to New Zealand in 1899. Once in New Zealand he likewise worked as a miner at Runanga and became involved in the local labour movement. From 1912 to 1913 he served as the secretary of the New Zealand Federation of Labour, known as the "Red Feds". He was both secretary and manager of the New Zealand Worker Printing and Publishing Company which published two other Labour newspapers The Standard and the Southern Cross, the latter of which he was also a director of until 1947.

In 1912, Glover had become the manager of the Maoriland Worker, New Zealand's leading labour journal of the time. In 1922 he was unsuccessfully prosecuted for blasphemous libel. To date, this is New Zealand's only trial for blasphemy ever held.

== Political career ==
Glover joined the Social Democratic Party after the 1913 unity conference and was later elected the national secretary of the Social Democratic Party in 1916. He would later play a prominent role in the unity meetings in July 1916 that would merge the Social Democrats with the remnants of the United Labour Party which led to the foundation of the modern New Zealand Labour Party. Upon its creation he was elected as the Labour Party's inaugural secretary-treasurer, serving from 1916 to 1919. Then Labour Party President Tom Paul later recalled of Glover: "...his service was as competent as it was unselfish. He just believed in the cause of Labour and worked hard in harmony with his faith. The movement has reason to thank the John Glovers of those early days".

Later, Glover would spend much time serving in local government. He served as a Wellington City Councillor twice in 1919–21 and 1926–27. Previously Glover had contested Wellington's mayoralty in 1914 for the Social Democratic Party (SDP), a more radical labour party than the existing United Labour Party who also stood a candidate resulting in a split vote on the left. Harry Holland was originally selected as the SDP candidate, but was unable to contest the mayoralty as he was engaged in a sedition case so Glover stood in his place.

At the 1919 local elections he was elected to the Wellington Hospital Board. He was defeated at the 1923 election, but was re-elected for a second spell in 1929. He remained a member until 1941 when he was defeated. In 1936 Glover was elected chairman of the board, beating the incumbent chair Fred Castle by 10 votes to 8. Four years later he was ousted in turn by Castle also by 10 votes to 8. The reversal was brought about by a controversial mid-term appointment in 1939. When Labour board member Sarah Snow died the Wellington City Council appointed William Gaudin to replace her rather than Ruby Muriel Collins who was expected to be awarded the vacated seat owing to being the highest polling unsuccessful candidate at the 1938 election (which Gaudin had not contested). Labour councillors opposed this and voted for Collins, arguing it was more fitting to replace a female Labour member with a female Labour candidate. The appointment was also crucial as it shifted the balance of power on the board, giving the Citizens' a majority of 10 seats to 8 (having previously been 9 seats each since 1938).

== Death ==
Glover had a serious accident when he fell and fractured a hip on March 4, 1946 on his way to work. He did not fully recover from the accident and was a long term patient. He died on 2 June 1947 at Silverstream Hospital.

== Notes ==
Party political offices
New title	Secretary of the Labour Party; 1916–1919	Succeeded by Michael Joseph Savage
Political offices
Preceded by Fred Castle	Chair of Wellington Hospital Board; 1936–1940	Succeeded by Fred Castle
