= 1914 Wellington mayoral election =

New Zealand local election

- 25 May 1914
- Turnout: 20,472 (50.19%)
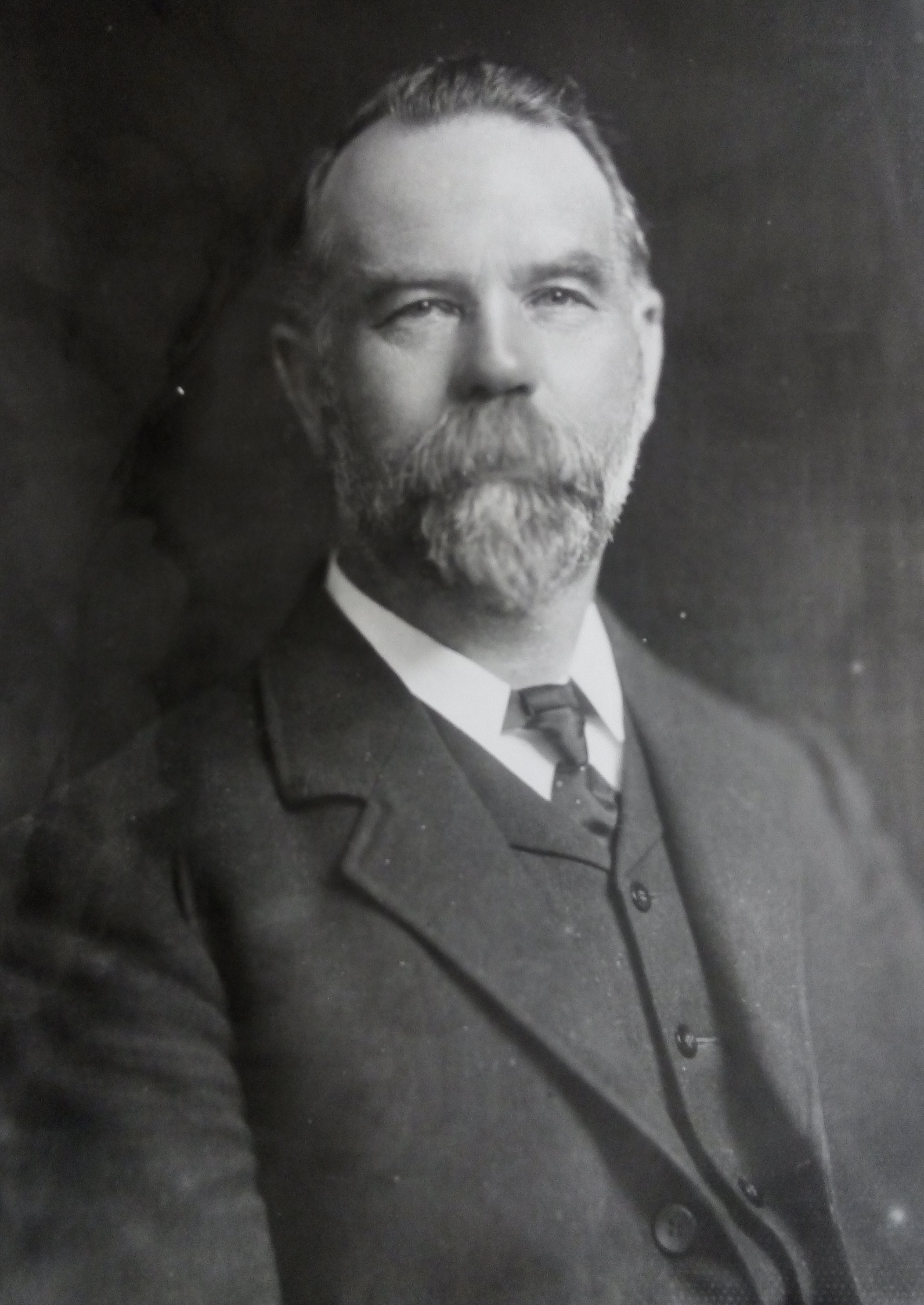

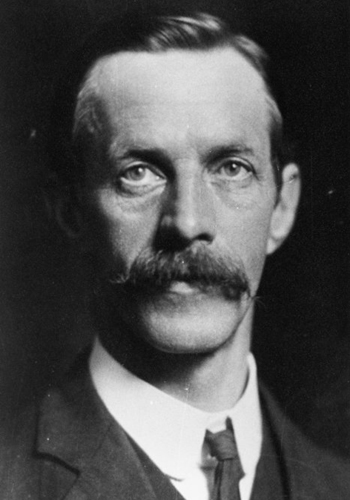

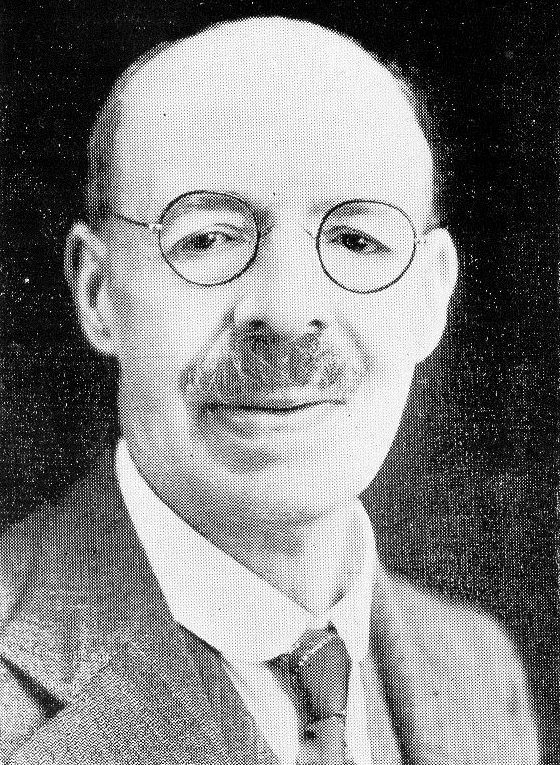
Candidate	John Luke	David McLaren	John Glover
Party	Citizens League	United Labour	Social Democrat
Popular vote	11,555	4,548	4,369
Percentage	56.44	22.21	21.34
Mayor before election
John Luke
Elected mayor
John Luke

The 1914 Wellington mayoral by-election was part of the New Zealand local elections held that same year. The polling was conducted using the standard first-past-the-post electoral method.

== Background ==
John Luke had been Mayor of Wellington since his election in 1913. Luke sought re-election against former Mayor David McLaren who was defeated by Luke a year earlier and stood for the mayoralty once again. The third contestant was John Glover, a newspaper editor, who entered the contest for the newly formed Social Democratic Party (SDP), a more radical labour party. Harry Holland was originally selected as the SDP candidate, but was unable to contest the mayoralty as he was engaged in a sedition case so Glover stood in his place. The divisions were deepened by McLaren's statement that SDP ringleader Bob Semple (later a councillor) was "as free from political principles as a frog from feathers". Glover's entry cut into McLaren's support base causing his polling to fall sharply from the previous two elections. Regardless of the divided labour vote, Luke won the contest with an outright majority.

The election came at the same time as the 1913 Great Strike, which began on the Wellington waterfront intensifying anti-Labour sentiment which assisted Luke in increasing his majority.

== Results ==
The following table gives the election results:

1914 Wellington mayoral election
Party	Candidate	Votes	%	±%
Citizens League	John Luke	11,555	56.44	+5.15
United Labour	David McLaren	4,548	22.21	−26.50
Social Democrat	John Glover	4,369	21.34	
Majority		7,007	34.22	+31.64
Turnout		20,472	50.19	−6.83
