= Maoriland Worker =

New Zealand labour journal

The Maoriland Worker, later called The Standard, was a leading New Zealand labour journal of the early 20th century.

It was launched in 1910 by the Shearers' Union and was initially published monthly (Frank Langstone was involved). The newspaper was produced in Christchurch for a short period, with Ettie Rout and Alexander Wildey prominent. It was published by Michael Laracy then General Secretary of the N.Z. Shearers' Union. It was soon taken over by the New Zealand Federation of Labour and became the official organ of the federation.

The journal ceased publication in 1960. At the time it was called The Standard, and was published weekly.

== Timeline ==
- 1910 – Robert Ross invited by the FOL from Melbourne to edit the paper
- 1911 – Robert Hogg (later editor of New Zealand Truth) was Manager.
- 1913 – Contributors Edward Hunter (Billy Banjo) and Harry Holland charged with sedition.
- 1913–1918 Harry Holland appointed editor.
- 1922 – Publisher John Glover prosecuted (unsuccessfully) for blasphemous libel. New Zealand's only trial to date for blasphemy.
- 1922 - The manager John Glover lent £100 interest free to Walter Nash.
- 1930s - Renamed to "the Standard".
- 1960 - Ceased publication.
