= Waerea =

Waerea is a Māori surname. Notable people with the surname include:

- James Waerea (1940–2019), New Zealand cartoonist, author and illustrator
- Jared Waerea-Hargreaves (born 1989), New Zealand rugby league footballer
