= 1933 New Zealand Labour Party leadership election =

New Zealand party leadership election

- 12 October 1933
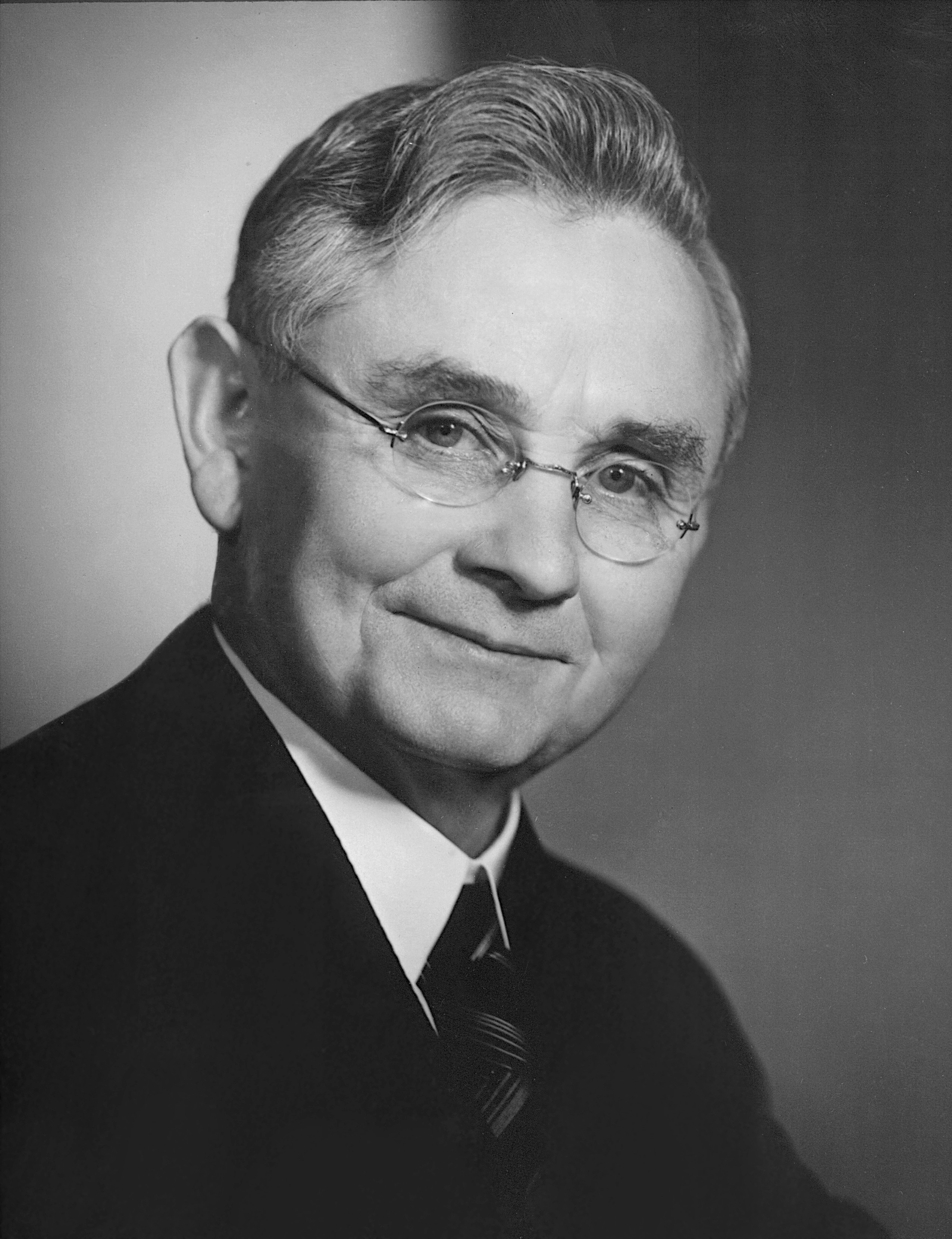
| Candidate | Michael Joseph Savage |
| Popular vote | elected unopposed |
Leader before election
Harry Holland
Leader after election
Michael Joseph Savage

The 1933 New Zealand Labour Party leadership election was held on 12 October 1933 to choose the third leader of the New Zealand Labour Party. The election was won by Auckland West MP and incumbent deputy-leader Michael Joseph Savage.

== Background ==
Previous Labour leader Harry Holland had led the party since 1919. He led them unsuccessfully in five elections between then and 1931. Holland had died attending the funeral of the Maori king on 8 October 1933, leading to the position of party leader to become vacant.

== Candidates ==
=== Michael Joseph Savage ===
Michael Joseph Savage had served as a Member of Parliament since 1919. Most saw Savage, the deputy leader as the natural successor to Holland. Longtime colleague Peter Fraser ruled out running and openly backed Savage.

=== John A. Lee ===
Lee was a flamboyant socialist who had aspirations of leadership himself. He sought nominations from both Fraser and Frank Langstone. Langstone offered him support if he decided to stand. However once Fraser nominated Savage, Lee declined, thinking it obvious that he would not succeed.

=== Peter Fraser ===
Peter Fraser was another proposed option as leader, but ruled out running for the leadership himself in favour of Savage.

== Result ==
As Savage was the only candidate officially nominated, he won the leadership unopposed. Savage's chief supporter, Peter Fraser, was elected as the new Deputy-leader.

== Aftermath ==
Savage led the Labour Party until his death in 1940. He led them to successive election victories in 1935 and 1938, becoming New Zealand's first Labour Prime Minister.
