= James Waerea =

New Zealand cartoonist

James Waerea (1940 – 2019) was a New Zealand Māori cartoonist, author and illustrator of Ngati Kahungunu and Te Arawa descent.

While Waerea was a primary school teacher, he began writing and illustrating the series of children's books Pukunui. There were four books in the series. In 2009 an American animation company began republishing his books. He was cartoonist for New Zealand Truth from 1991, his last cartoons appearing in the early 2000s.

Diamond notes that Waerea called 'Maori to account' but his cartoons deployed 'a whimsical humour' which defused 'tension around sensitive issues'.

Waerea died in 2019.

== Selected works ==
- Pukunui (1976)
- Pukunui and his friend Moata Moa (1981)
- Pukunui the astronaut (1982)
- Pukunui's hangi (1986)
