= Robert Hogg (New Zealand politician) =

New Zealand socialist politician, journalist and poet

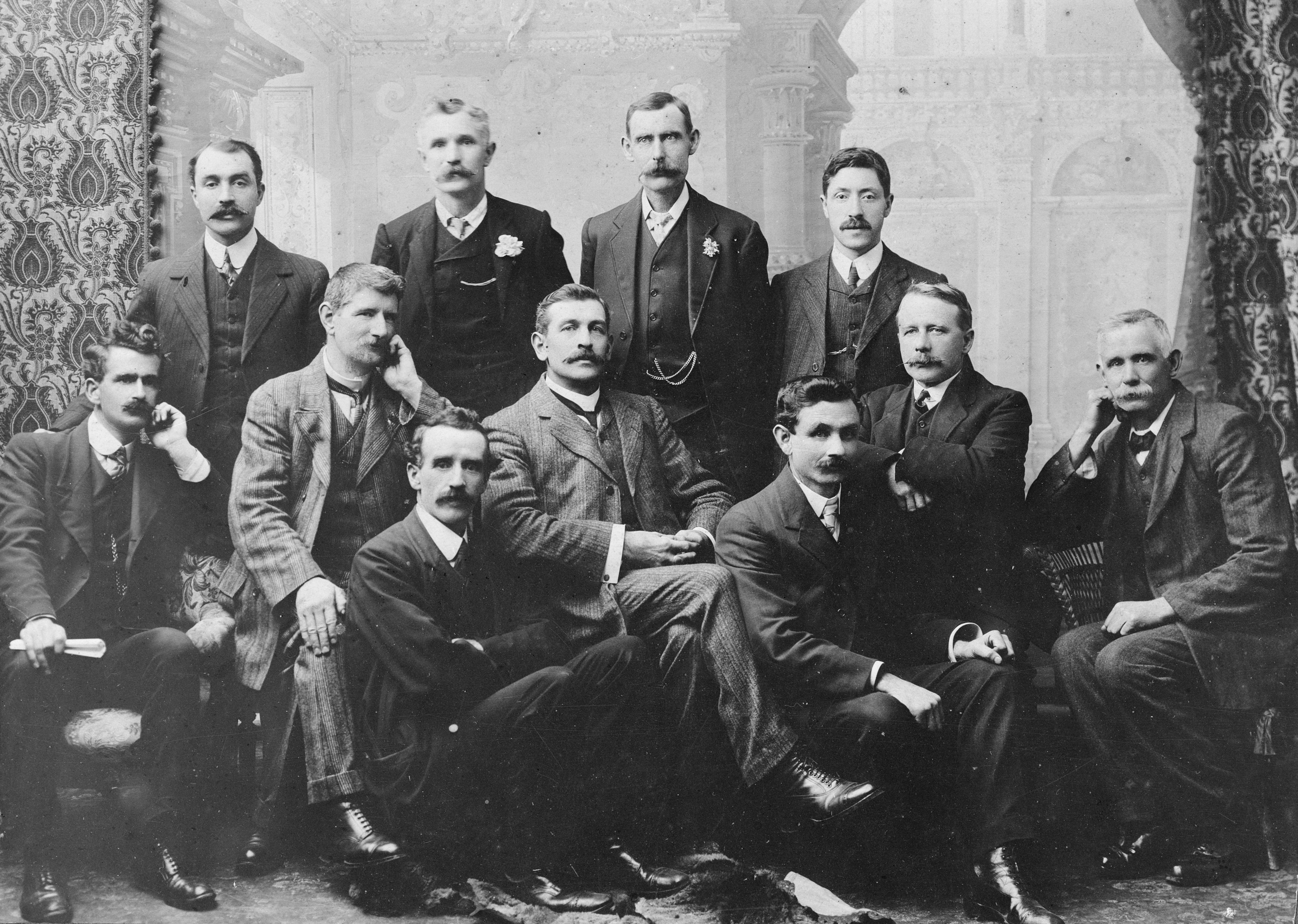
Delegates to the fourth annual conference of the New Zealand Socialist Party, held in Dunedin in 1911. Hogg is second from the left in the middle row.

Robert Hogg (28 January 1864 – 9 May 1941) was a New Zealand socialist politician, journalist and poet.

== Biography ==
=== Early life ===
Robert Hogg was born in Blochairn, Glasgow, Scotland, on 28 January 1864, the son of Samuel and Elizabeth Pearson Hogg. His father was an iron puddler.

He began work at the post office in Musselburgh, East Lothian, where he was a member of the Independent Labour Party In Scotland he was active in the Scottish ILP and a friend of Keir Hardie. On 25 January 1888 he married Mary Smith, a muslin warehouse woman, at Glasgow.

=== New Zealand ===
He and his family emigrated to New Zealand in 1900, where he tried farming before taking a job as the sub-editor of the New Zealand Times. He also edited a socialist newspaper, the Commonweal, where he wrote a column under the name of "Blochairn", about "The world of work", and a second column, by "Busy Bee", which displayed an expert knowledge of Scottish literature and dialect.

In 1908 he was elected chairman of the New Zealand Socialist Party. With Jim Roberts he kept the Wellington Socialist Party out of the 1912 "unity scheme" to combine the socialist and Labour parties in New Zealand. He managed the Maoriland Worker in 1911, and from 1913 to 1925 was editor of New Zealand Truth.

Hogg died at his home in the Wellington suburb of Johnsonville on 9 May 1941.

== Literary interests ==
Robert Hogg had a lifelong interest in Scottish literature, and amassed a library of over 2000 volumes (over 1100 titles). Hogg also wrote several books in prose and verse under the pseudonym of "Robert Blochairn". In 1941 The Robert and Mary Hogg Bequest of over 1100 titles concerning Scottish literature, history and topography was donated to the National Library of New Zealand.
