= Mount Tregear =

Mountain in Canterbury Region, New Zealand

- Location within New Zealand

Highest point
- Elevation: 2,042 m (6,699 ft)
- Coordinates: 43°5.323′S 171°8.7′E

Geography
- Location: South Island, New Zealand
- Parent range: Southern Alps

Mount Tregear, is a 2042 m mountain in New Zealand's South Island.

It is on the main divide at the head of the Mathias River of New Zealand's Southern Alps, 38 kilometres southwest of Arthurs Pass and is named after Edward Robert Tregear.
