= Hiram Hunter =

New Zealand politician and trade unionist

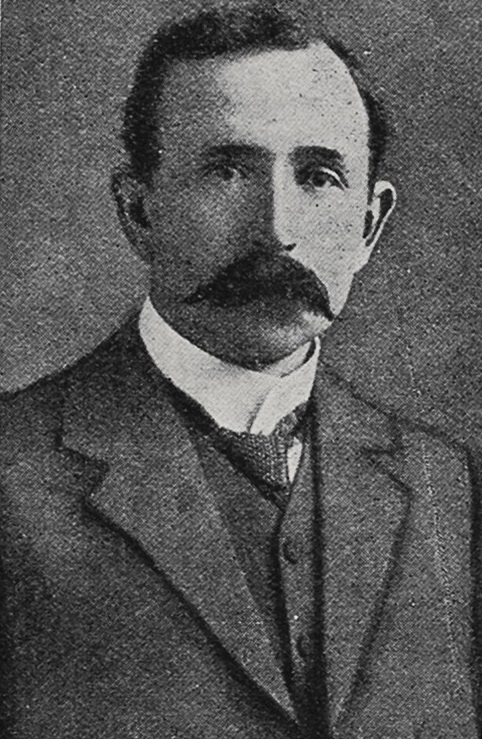

Christchurch City Councillor
- In office 1911–1915
- In office 1917–1923

2nd President of the Social Democratic Party
- In office 1914–1915
- Vice President: Frederick Cooke
- Preceded by: Edward Tregear
- Succeeded by: Frederick Cooke

Personal details
- Born: 10 February 1874 Christchurch, New Zealand
- Died: 9 May 1966 (aged 92) Ashburton, New Zealand
- Party: Labour (1910–13); Social Democratic (1913–16); Labour (1916–31); National (1938–66)
- Spouse: Jane Bayliss

Hiram Hunter (10 February 1874 – 9 May 1966) was a New Zealand politician and trade unionist.

== Early life ==
Born in Christchurch in 1874, Hunter was a farmer, storekeeper, carter, and trade unionist.

== Political career ==
Hunter stood for the Christchurch East electorate in the New Zealand House of Representatives in 1911 for the Labour Party (original), 1914 for the Social Democratic Party and 1919 for the New Zealand Labour Party. His best result was losing by 136 votes in 1911 in a close three-way contest, and failing to qualify for the subsequent run-off election by just four votes. He was President of the LRC (1911–1913) and of the Social Democratic Party (1913–1915). In 1931, he contested the Mid-Canterbury electorate as an Independent Labour candidate against Jeremiah Connolly, but was unsuccessful.

During the 1930s, Hunter became increasingly disillusioned with the NZ Labour Party and argued that: "We have learned much of socialisation through its application in Russia. The result has been servility for the workers under the domination of dictators and, what seemed a book of beautiful ideal in 1915 has turned out to be in practice, a horrible reality". In 1938 he stood for the conservative National Party against his former Labour comrade Dan Sullivan who beat him by a three to one margin, with the election-night crowd booing him so loudly his speech could not be heard leaving Hunter with an undignified end to his public career.

Hiram Hunter was a member of the Christchurch City Council for ten years (1911–1915; 1917–1923).

== Death ==
Hunter died in 1966 at Ashburton.

== Notes ==
Party political offices
| Preceded by Edward Tregear | President of the Social Democratic Party; 1914–1915 | Succeeded by Frederick Cooke |
