= Jessie Aitken =

New Zealand community worker and political activist

Jessie Aitken (née Fraser; 14 April 1867 – 18 January 1934) was a New Zealand community worker and political activist. She was born in Ecclesmachan, West Lothian, Scotland, on 14 April 1867.

== Personal life ==
Aitken was born to Janet Hearne and Walter Fraser. Fraser, her parents and her three younger sisters, arrived at Lyttelton on 2 September 1874 after emigrating to New Zealand aboard the Cantebury. By 1884, the family lived in Denniston, Westland.

Aitken married John Barr Aitken, a coal miner, when she was seventeen, on 25 July 1884. They lived at Burnett's Face until around 1902, moving shortly after to the mining town of Kaitangata. John Barr Aitken died in 1907 in Nelson, leaving Aitken to move in with her son Hugh in Wellington. After her political career, she lived in Melbourne, moving back to Wellington in 1928.

She died on 18 January 1934 in Wellington.

== Activism and political career ==
Aitken was part of many women's groups in Wellington. She was a member of the Wellington Housewive's Union, a feminist organisation closely associated with the Social Democratic Party, which later became the New Zealand Labour Party.

=== Anti-war activism ===
Aitken was a member of the Women's Anti-Conscription League during the first world war. She was a key speaker in the large protest the league organised to wait on Prime Minister William Massey. She believed that military service was "a matter of individual conscience". Massey was dismissive of and angered by the women, and the Military Service Bill passed shortly after.

Aitken was president of the Wellington branch of the Women's International League from 1916 to 1918. The League promoted international cooperation, better treatment of conscientious objectors, and women's rights.

=== Labour Party ===
In 1917, Aitken was elected as a Labour candidate to the Wellington Hospital and Charitable Aid Board. She enhanced welfare of women and children while in this position, and worked to improve public health and provide assistance to families in need. In 1918, she worked hard to deal with the influenza epidemic, and in 1919, worked to help the widows, widowers and orphans created by the epidemic.

Aitken attended two New Zealand Labour Party conferences. In 1917, she attended as a delegate for the Women's International League, and in 1918, for the Wellington Labour Representation Committee, where she fought for higher state allowances for widows and more women delegates at party conferences.

Together with Sarah Beck, Jane Donaldson and Sarah Snow, Aitken urged Labour MPs to introduce legislation that would allow women to stand as parliamentary candidates. The Women's Parliamentary Rights Act was passed in 1919.

Aitken stood for election to the Wellington City Council as a Labour candidate in 1919. She was the first woman to do this. She promised to improve housing conditions and sanitation, provide public bathrooms for women and playgrounds for children. She was not elected. Later that year, Aitken was on the committee that discussed women's and children's issues for the first New Zealand Town-planning Conference and Exhibition.

She resigned from the Labour Party in 1920.
