= Alice Cassie =

New Zealand political activist

Alice Mary Cassie (19 November 1887 – 17 March 1963) was a New Zealand political activist and feminist. She was born in Dundee, Angus, Scotland on 19 November 1887.
