= Mathias River =

Coordinates: 43°17′S 171°15′E

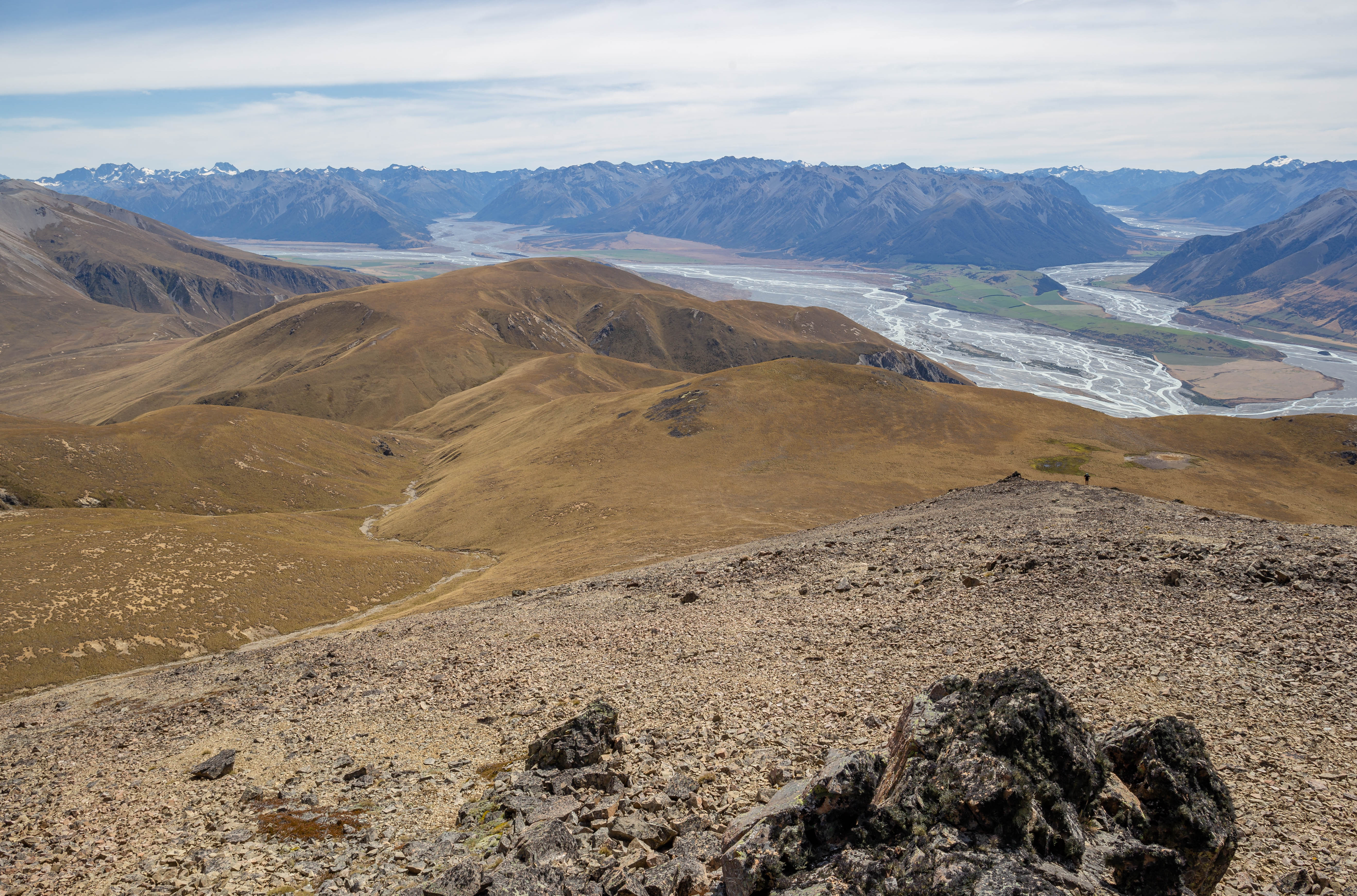

Location
- Country: New Zealand

Physical characteristics
- Source
  - location: Southern Alps
- Mouth
  - location: Rakaia River
- Length: 17 km (11 mi)

The Mathias River is a river of the Canterbury region of New Zealand's South Island. It flows from its origins in three rivers (the North, South, and West Mathias Rivers) in the Southern Alps. Of these, the North Mathias River is the longest, flowing predominantly southwards from its source northeast of Mount Williams. After 18 kilometres (11 mi) its waters combine with those of the West Mathias River, which flows predominantly southwest for 13 kilometres (8 mi) from its sources 10 kilometres (6 mi) west of Mount Williams. The South Mathias River, a tributary of the West Mathias River, is a 6-kilometre (4 mi) long easterly-flowing river which meets the West Mathias 5 kilometres (3 mi) from its confluence with the North Mathias.

The combined waters flow a further 17 kilometres (11 mi) southeast across a braided, shingle strath, which meets with the valley of the Rakaia River 15 kilometres (9 mi) west of Lake Coleridge.

The river was named by Sir Julius von Haast after his companion Alured George Mathias, during his Rakaia trip.

== See also ==
- List of rivers of New Zealand
