= Frederick Cooke (socialist) =

New Zealand tailor, socialist, trade unionist

Frederick Riley Cooke
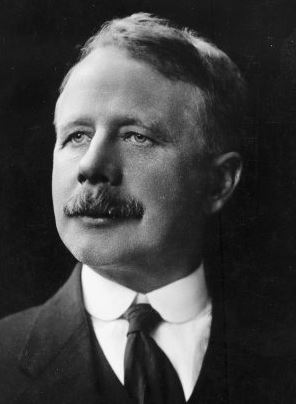

5th President of the Labour Party
- In office 15 July 1921 – 7 July 1922
- Vice President: Tim Armstrong
- Leader: Harry Holland
- Preceded by: Peter Fraser
- Succeeded by: Tom Brindle

3rd President of the Social Democratic Party
- In office 1915–1916
- Preceded by: Hiram Hunter
- Succeeded by: Peter Fraser

Personal details
- Born: 28 April 1867 Leeds, Yorkshire, England
- Died: 26 June 1930 (aged 63) Christchurch, New Zealand
- Party: Labour (1916–1930)
- Other political affiliations: Socialist Party (1901–13); Social Democratic Party (1913–16)
- Spouse: Ida Clough
- Occupation: Trade unionist

Frederick Riley Cooke (28 April 1867 – 26 June 1930) was a New Zealand tailor, socialist and trade unionist.

== Early life ==
Cooke was born in Leeds, Yorkshire, England on 28 April 1867. He started his working life aged seven and was almost entirely self-educated. He married Ida Clough on 1 August 1891 in Bradford, where he was living at the time.

== Political career ==
He came to New Zealand in 1900 and was a founding member of Socialist Party. He stood as a parliamentary candidate in the Christchurch East electorate in 1905, 1908, and 1911 and received few votes, but he regarded his candidacies as a good propaganda tool.

At the unity conference in 1913, Cooke was a forceful opponent of compulsory military training. The Socialist Party merged with United Labour Party at that conference to form the Social Democratic Party, and Cooke was elected vice president in 1914, and president in 1915. In 1916, the Social Democratic Party merged to become the Labour Party. Cooke was Labour's vice president (1920/1921) and president (1921/22). He was a member of Christchurch City Council from a by-election in 1920 onwards.

Cooke unsuccessfully contested further parliamentary elections for the Labour Party: Ashburton in 1922, Christchurch North in 1925, and Waitaki in 1928.

Cooke died in Christchurch on 26 June 1930; he had suffered from diabetes for the last decade and had developed prostate cancer. He was buried at Sydenham Cemetery. Addresses were given at the funeral by Ted Howard (MP), Peter Fraser (MP), John Archer (Mayor of Christchurch), and Jack McCullough (trade unionist).

== Notes ==
Party political offices
Preceded by Hiram Hunter	President of the Social Democratic Party; 1915–1916	Succeeded by Peter Fraser
Preceded by Peter Fraser	President of the Labour Party; 1921–1922	Succeeded by Tom Brindle
