= 1913 Great Strike =

1913 near general strike in New Zealand

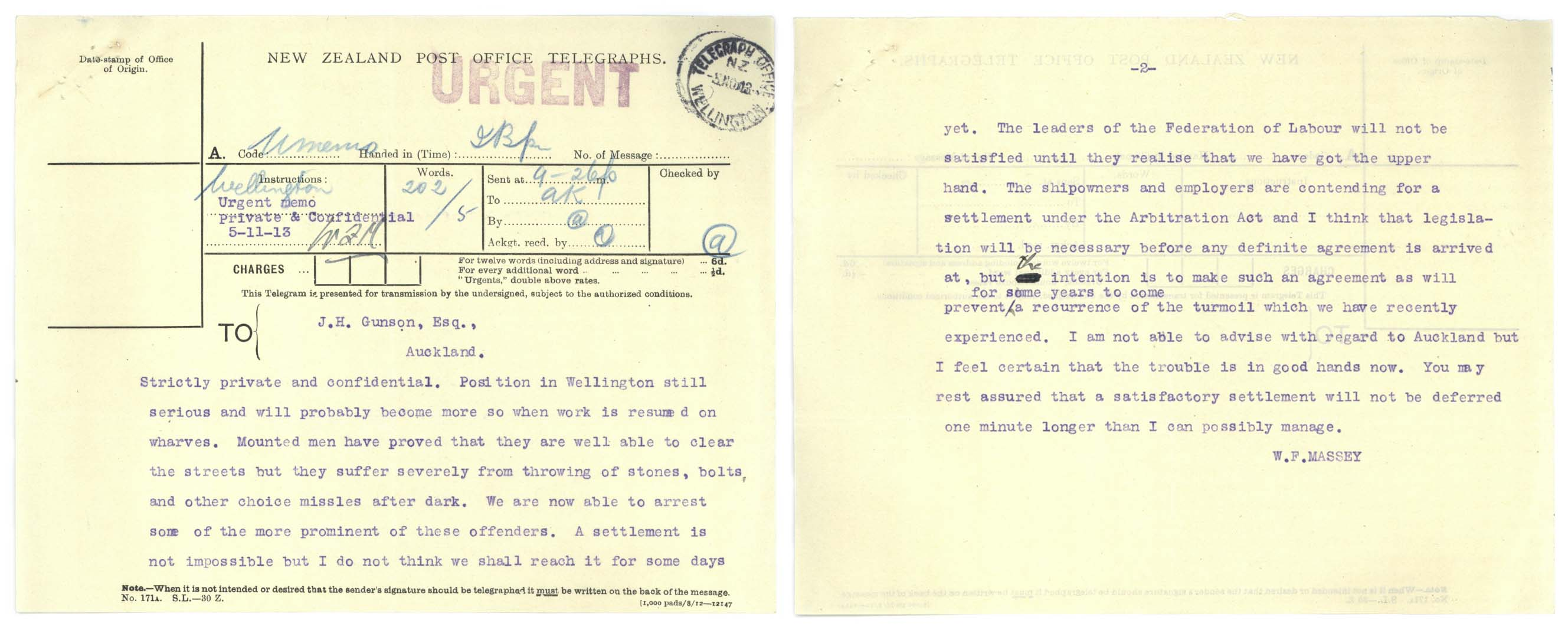
- Urgent memorandum sent by Premier Massey to the Chair of the Auckland Harbour Board during the strike
- Date: 19 October 1913 – January 1914
- Location: New Zealand
- Result: Workers' defeat

Parties
United Federation of Labour; Social Democratic Party; Industrial Workers of the World (IWW)	New Zealand government New Zealand Employers’ Federation; New Zealand Farmer's Union

Lead figures
Harry Holland; Peter Fraser; Bob Semple	William Massey

The Great Strike refers to a near general strike that took place in New Zealand from October 1913 to mid-January 1914. It was the largest and most disruptive strike in New Zealand's history. At its height, it brought the economy of New Zealand almost to a halt. Between 14,000 and 16,000 workers went on strike, out of a population of just over one million.

The dispute began with a coal miners' strike in Huntly and on the Wellington waterfront, and quickly spread to other industries around the country.

== Origins ==
In 1909 militant trade unionists had formed the New Zealand Federation of Labour (the "Red Feds") an organisation opposed to the Liberal government's Industrial Conciliation and Arbitration Act, which meant labour disputes had to be settled though conciliation boards and arbitration courts. Unions at first generally regarded the arbitration system as beneficial, while many employers saw it as limiting their powers. With no significant stoppages between 1894 and 1906, New Zealand became known internationally as ‘the country without strikes’.

However, unionists had several complaints about the arbitration system; it failed to increase wages in line with the cost of living, did not compel employers to pay for all hours of work, and the provisions for employers hiring workers at less than agreed rates were considered too loose. The growth in the number of unions in the early 1900s increased the arbitration courts' workload to the point that unions could wait up to a year before getting a hearing. In 1905 an amendment to the act made strike action and lockouts illegal where there was an award covering employers and workers and another amendment in 1907 increased the penalties for striking illegally. Only unions registered under the Trade Union Act passed the following year could legally strike.

With the forming of the federation, affiliated unions withdrew from the IC&A Act and registered under the Trade Union Act. By 1911 the organisations' membership had doubled to nearly 14,000 workers. In March 1913 a dispute began between Wellington shipwrights and the Union Steam Ship Company; the workers wanted the company to either pay them for travelling time or provide them with transport to new workshops at Evans Bay. In May the shipwrights cancelled their registration under the IC&A Act and joined the Federation-affiliated Wellington Waterside Workers' Union (WWWU).

== Industrial action ==
On 6 October, Allison's Taupiri Coal Company sacked sixteen miners at Huntly, three of whom had recently been elected to the arbitration union's executive. The company refused another ballot and the directors declared that there was nothing to discuss with the union. Three days later the workers voted almost unanimously to strike until the sixteen men, and other miners not re-employed after a strike the previous year, were reinstated. After receiving congratulations from the UFL the miners asked the federation to take control of the dispute.

Meanwhile, the Wellington shipwrights had added further grievances to their list, including demands for increased pay and holidays, and they began a strike on 18 October. The wharfies held a stop work meeting at 08:00 on the 20th and decided to refer the dispute to the UFL and returned to work, only to find that scabs had been hired in their place. In defiance of their president another meeting was held and 1,500 workers decided "That no work shall be accepted until such time as the victimised men are re-instated".

On 5 November, strike supporters clashed with mounted special constables who were riding from their base at Buckle St to Lambton station. Their mission was to escort racehorses from the station to the wharves so they could be shipped to Christchurch for the New Zealand Cup race meeting. The battle between the two parties began on Featherston Street, where specials charged strikers. Pro-strike tram drivers rammed specials on horseback, and metal spikes and detonators were thrown at horses’ feet. The specials later assumed control of the wharves. It was a decisive moment in the strike.

The events in Wellington and Huntly received national attention over the next week and many Wobblies in Auckland and Wellington called for action. On 24 October the wharfies invaded several ships and stopped work, that same day the ship owners offered to reinstate the 1912 agreement if work was resumed, but the union rejected the proposal. In Huntly no miners or truckers went to work. The company claimed the union was breaking their agreement, though union leader Harry Holland stated that the 'agreement' had been drafted by the company and 'agreed to' when there was no union. Recalling the events later striker Banjo Hunter recalled "the strike fever spread like a huge epidemic wave"

During the strike, younger farmers were enlisted by the government to work as special constables, known as Massey's Cossacks. These farmers worked and protected areas such as Queens Wharf, Auckland. In Wellington 'foot specials' were recruited from middle-class urban workers.

== Interpretation ==
The conventional idea of the strike is that it was part of a global change in both the ideological beliefs and strategic methods of trade unionists worldwide as the ideas of syndicalism spread. However most of the workers in the strike were 'ordinary people.' it is often seen as an instance of class war; the workers of New Zealand fighting against the employers and their allies in the conservative Reform government that had come to power in 1912.

Some historians have suggested that employers engineered the conflict, for example Michael King wrote that "In October of that year [1913]... employers fearing a continuation of 'revolutionary' union tactics, engineered a lockout on the Wellington wharves." and Richard Hill in his history of the police wrote "the federationists were the victims of a government determined to destroy its class enemies... Leading employers decided to strike at the heart of the union movement before the united federation had a chance to consolidate... with the government assisting in various ways ... the government was more interested in crushing the watersiders than getting the wharves going."
