= John Lundon (cricketer) =

New Zealand cricketer

Personal information
- Full name: John Raphael Lundon
- Born: 26 November 1868; Auckland, New Zealand
- Died: 6 October 1957 (aged 88); Auckland, New Zealand
- Source: ESPNcricinfo, 15 June 2016

John Raphael Lundon (26 November 1868 – 6 October 1957) was a New Zealand cricketer. He played four first-class matches for Auckland between 1892 and 1894.

In later life he was active in civic affairs in Auckland. He stood perennially for the Auckland City Council and Auckland Hospital and Charitable Aid Board as an independent candidate. Only once was he successful, winning a seat on the Auckland City Council in 1929, he was defeated in 1931 and never regained a seat.

== See also ==
- List of Auckland representative cricketers
