= Sarah Snow =

Political activist, feminist, welfare worker

- Born: 1864
- Died: 1939

Sarah Ellen Oliver Snow (née Murphy, 16 February 1864 – 13 February 1939) was a New Zealand political activist, feminist and welfare worker. She was on the national executive of the Social Democratic Party, was on the first executive council of the New Zealand Labour Party. Snow was president of the Labour Women's Conference for several years. She was on the board of the Wellington Hospital.

== Life ==
Snow was born in Wellington, New Zealand in 1864. Her father, who was in the Wellington Province Armed Police Force, died when she was ten, leaving the family in financial difficulty. She married a labourer in 1892, and had six children with him, along with an earlier daughter she adopted out. Snow became an integral part of the Wellington Housewives' Union, which was formed in 1912.

Snow was on the national executive of the Social Democratic Party. Together with Elizabeth McCombs, she was voted onto the first executive council of the New Zealand Labour Party in 1916. She sought the nomination for the Wellington South electorate for the 1922 election, but was beaten by Robert McKeen, who subsequently became the electorate's representative. For a few years from 1927, the national Labour Party conferences were preceded by a Labour Women's Conference, and Snow was the president of these conferences.

Snow undertook charitable aid work and was on the Wellington Hospital board. After a hospital board meeting, she was struck by a tram in Riddiford Street outside Wellington Hospital on 19 January 1939. She broke her leg, but died on 13 February; the coroner's verdict was for heart failure caused by the shock of the crash.
