= NZ Truth =

Defunct New Zealand newspaper (1905–2014)

- Format: Tabloid
- Editor: Cameron Slater (2012–2014)
- Founded: 1905
- Ceased publication: 2013
- Political alignment: Centre-right
- Headquarters: Auckland, New Zealand

NZ Truth was a tabloid newspaper published weekly in New Zealand from 1905 to 2013.

== History ==
NZ Truth was founded in 1905 by Australian John Norton in Wellington, as a New Zealand edition of his Sydney Truth, aiming a sensational blend of sex, crime and radical politics at mainly working class readers.

According to newspaper historian (and former NZ Truth journalist) Redmer Yska, English-born Norton was 'a combustible mix of tycoon, journalist, do-gooder and chronic, falldown pisshead.' It had 40,000 readers by 1907, with circulation in 'every Miners', Gum Diggers' and Timber-Getter's camp'. Three years later Frederick Dawson, a former editor of Norton's Queensland and West Australia editions of Truth took over. He would remain in the job until 1920. Norton meanwhile died of alcoholism, in 1916.

The leader writer (and, briefly, editor) from 1913 to 1922 was Robert Hogg, a Scottish-born journalist and socialist. According to Yska. Hogg 'turned NZ Truth into a fiery and enthusiastic mouthpiece for revolutionary socialism'. That would change in 1922 when John Norton's son Ezra became the Sydney-based owner and proprietor, appointing a string of New Zealand-based editors. Under the populist Norton, the 'worker's paper' became the streamlined family-friendly 'national paper'. Norton's most successful editor was Australian Brian Connolly and over 16 years (1935 to 1951), he would return the paper to its working-class roots, albeit with a conservative streak.

In 1951, Norton sold out to a New Zealand consortium led by the paper's legal representative James Dunn and his former Scots College schoolmate Cliff Plimmer. Over the next few decades, the New Zealand owners would refashion NZ Truth into what Yska calls 'a shrill megaphone for a conservative establishment holding back political, social and cultural ties that increasingly threatened to sweep it away.'

Over the decades, NZ Truth variously employed well-known New Zealand authors, including Robin Hyde in 1928.

As in Australia, NZ Truth capitalised on unrestricted press coverage of divorce cases during its first half century, with court evidence of adultery cases given lengthy, invariably saucy treatment. In 1958, a Labour government passed a law restricting coverage to the bare bones of proceedings, removing a vital part of Truth's content. In 1963, as revelations of a seamy British political scandal unfolded, audited circulation reached a peak of 240,000, and the weekly claimed a readership of a million Kiwis. By 1980, circulation stood at 150,000, but a move to Auckland headquarters in 1982 and a 'brighter' Truth and TV Extra failed. By the mid 1990s, circulation fell to 50,000, and in 2005 to 12,000.

== Cameron Slater's involvement ==
At the end of October 2012, controversial right-wing blogger Cameron Slater was announced as the paper's new editor. He said in his new role he would be "kicking arse and sticking up for the little guy". His first issue was published that November. As a result of his appointment, the paper's left-wing columnist Martyn Bradbury quit. Within six months of Slater's appointment it was announced the publication would cease production in July 2013, with Slater claiming it was "too far gone".

Despite ceasing to publish a print version of the website, the publication continued to update its website until May 2014.
