= New Zealand Federation of Labour (1909) =

- Nickname: Red Federation
- Predecessor: New Zealand Federation of Miners
- Established: 1908; 118 years ago
- Type: National trade union confederation
- Location: New Zealand

The New Zealand Federation of Labour, also known as The Red Federation and The United Federation of Labour, was a New Zealand federation of syndicalist trade unions which was formalised in 1909. The federation is best known for its involvement in the nationwide Great Strike of 1913 which almost brought New Zealand's economy to a halt. The Federation's members were often referred to as 'Red Feds'.

== History ==
The federation was originally formed as the New Zealand Federation of Miners in 1908 after a strike of coal miners in Greymouth. The strike was largely in opposition to an arbitration act by government which meant that industrial disputes had to be settled in a special court. In 1909 the federation was renamed to the New Zealand Federation of Labour. The Federation was inspired by American union federations including the Industrial Workers of the World, which were often called the "Wobblies" in New Zealand.

The Waihi Trade Union of Workers was involved with the Federation. The Federation helped support the 1912 Waihi Miners Strike. Member unions donated to the strikers, and some others temporarily walked away from their jobs in solidarity. Towards the end of the strike, some of the more-radical workers had joined under the IWW banner and the Federation lost some control over the strike.

Prominent leaders included Bob Semple who in 1935 became Minister of Public Works with the first Labour Government.

=== 1913 General Strike ===
In 1913, the Federation played a leading role in nation-wide strike action which almost escalated into a general strike. This industrial action followed a dispute in Wellington where waterside workers demanded better pay, and another dispute in Huntly. The strikes were ultimately defeated in 1914 by scab workers and strike-breaking police.

The Federation was defeated during the Great Strike. Many prominent leaders of the federation, and other socialist organisations, went on to form the New Zealand Labour Party in 1916.
