= Social Democratic Party (New Zealand) =

Social Democratic Party of New Zealand
- Abbreviation: SDP
- Founded: 1 July 1913
- Dissolved: 1 June 1922; 102 years ago (continuing group)
- Merger of: United Labour Party; New Zealand Socialist Party
- Merged into: Labour Party
- Ideology: Social democracy
- Political position: Centre-left to left-wing

The Social Democratic Party of New Zealand was an early centre-left to left-wing political party. It existed only a short time before being amalgamated into the new Labour Party. During its period of existence, the party held two seats in Parliament.

== Unity Conference ==
Socialist; Party (1901)	Independent; Political; Labour; League (1905)
(independents)	Labour Party (original) (1910)
United Labour; Party (1912)
Social Democratic; Party (1913)	(remnants)
Labour Party (1916)

The Social Democratic Party was founded in January 1913 at a so-called "Basis of Unity" Conference (often simply called the "Unity Conference"). This meeting drew together the most prominent left-wing groups in New Zealand, including both political parties and trade unions. The aim was to unite the fractious labour movement into a cohesive force. At the end of the Conference, most of the attendees agreed to merge into two new organisations – the new United Federation of Labour would co-ordinate the trade unions, while the two main political parties (the hard-line Socialist Party and the moderate United Labour Party) would merge to form the Social Democrats. Not all members of the United Labour Party accepted the plan, however, and some continued on under the same banner and continued as a Rump party.

The Social Democrats were founded with the purpose of becoming "...the political embodiment of working-class ideals aspirations" in parliament.

Jack McCullough was the organiser for the Lower Riccarton branch and also organised campaigns for Christchurch City Council elections.

== Strike and 1914 election ==
The Social Democrats gained a rapid boost when, shortly after their formation, Paddy Webb and James McCombs won by-elections and entered Parliament. They joined with John Robertson, who won a seat in the 1911 election as a Labour candidate bringing the Social Democrat caucus to three. Later the same year, however, a controversial strike broke out among groups of dockworkers and miners. Moderates in the union movement considered the strike ill-advised and dangerous, while radicals strongly supported it. The strike was heavily suppressed by the government of William Massey, and the United Federation of Labour was left broken and disorganised. The Social Democrats, still closely linked to the United Federation of Labour, were plunged into disarray, with three of the party's leaders, Harry Holland, Peter Fraser and Bob Semple, being jailed for their roles in the strike.

As a result of the chaos, the Social Democrats went into the 1914 elections with little in the way of planning. Co-operation with local labour organisations was sporadic, as was co-operation with the remnants of the United Labour Party. However, union anger at the government for its "heavy-handed" response to the 1913 strikes was still strong, and the outbreak of World War I had also strengthened the labour vote. In the election, Paddy Webb and James McCombs retained their seats under the Social Democratic banner while the remnants of the United Labour Party won three seats, and a labour-aligned independent John Payne was also successful.

By 1915, the Social Democrats had in its ranks 2 MPs, 2 Mayors; 17 city and borough councillors, 6 members of hospital and charitable aid boards and 2 members of harbour boards.

The six labour-aligned MPs worked together in Parliament despite being from different parties, with Alfred Hindmarsh of the United Labour Party selected as the unified caucus' chairman. In August 1915, when Massey formed his Liberal-Reform coalition government, he extended an invitation to Hindmarsh's caucus. The "Labour" members declined the offer and, as a result, became the official Opposition in Parliament.

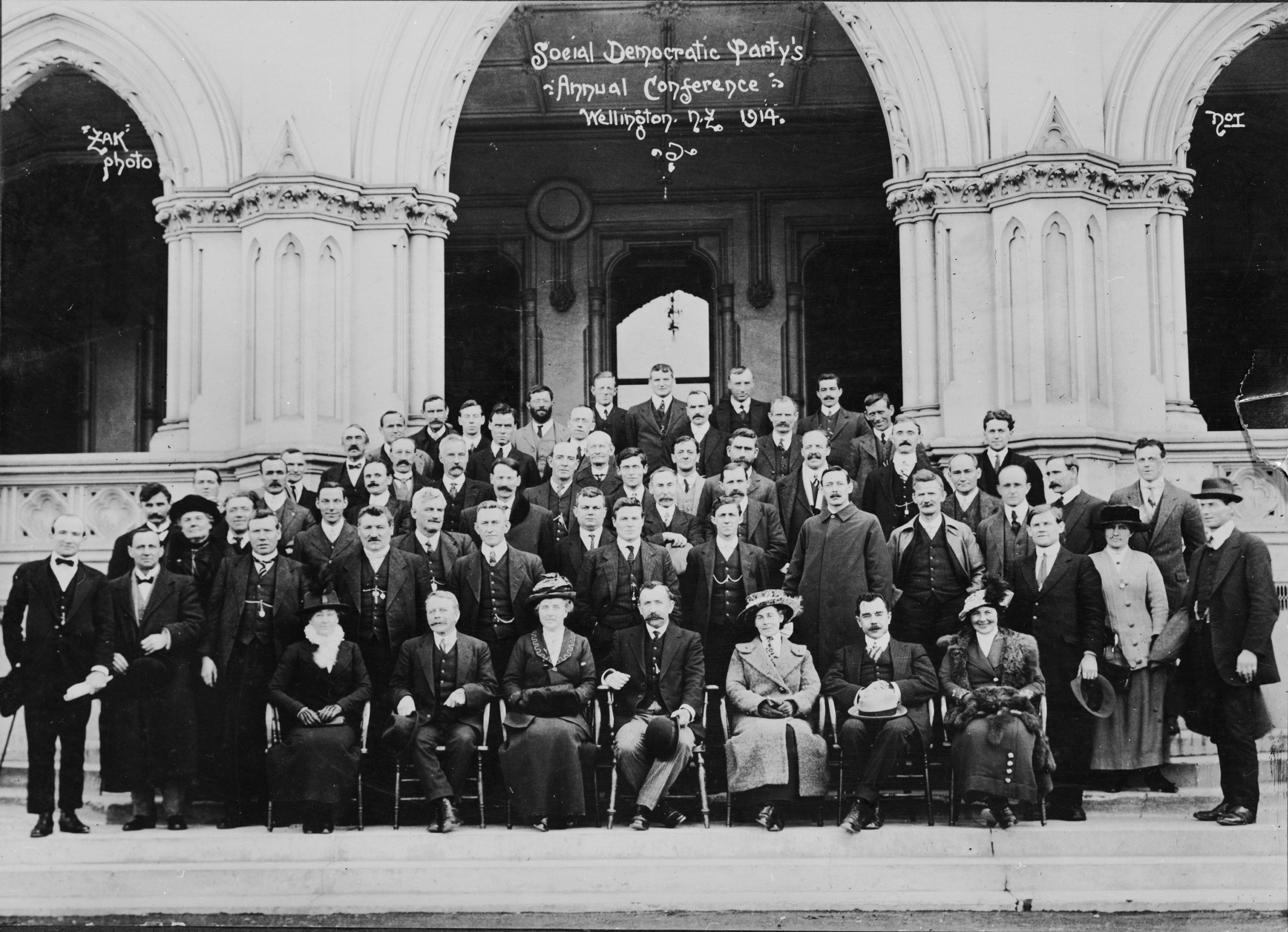
Group photo from the Social Democratic Party Annual Conference in Wellington, 1914.

== Formation of the Labour Party ==
Two years later, in 1916, the close working relationship between the Social Democrats and the ULP remnant was formalised with a merger – the two officially came together as the Labour Party, the same organisation that survives today. The organisation of the Social Democratic Party survived however, and the more militant inclined members of the newly formed Labour Party remained as an "alter-ego" of Labour still campaigning for the goal of complete socialisation until their eventual disbandment in June 1922.

== List of presidents ==
- Edward Tregear (1913–14)
- Hiram Hunter (1914–15)
- Frederick Cooke (1915–16)
- Peter Fraser (1916–18)
- Tom Brindle (1918–22)
