= 1929 Wellington mayoral election =

New Zealand local election

- 1 May 1929
- Turnout: 23,884 (51.55%)
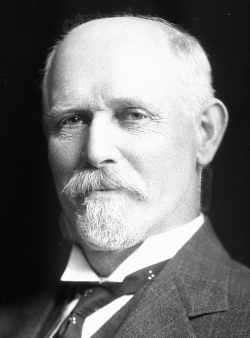

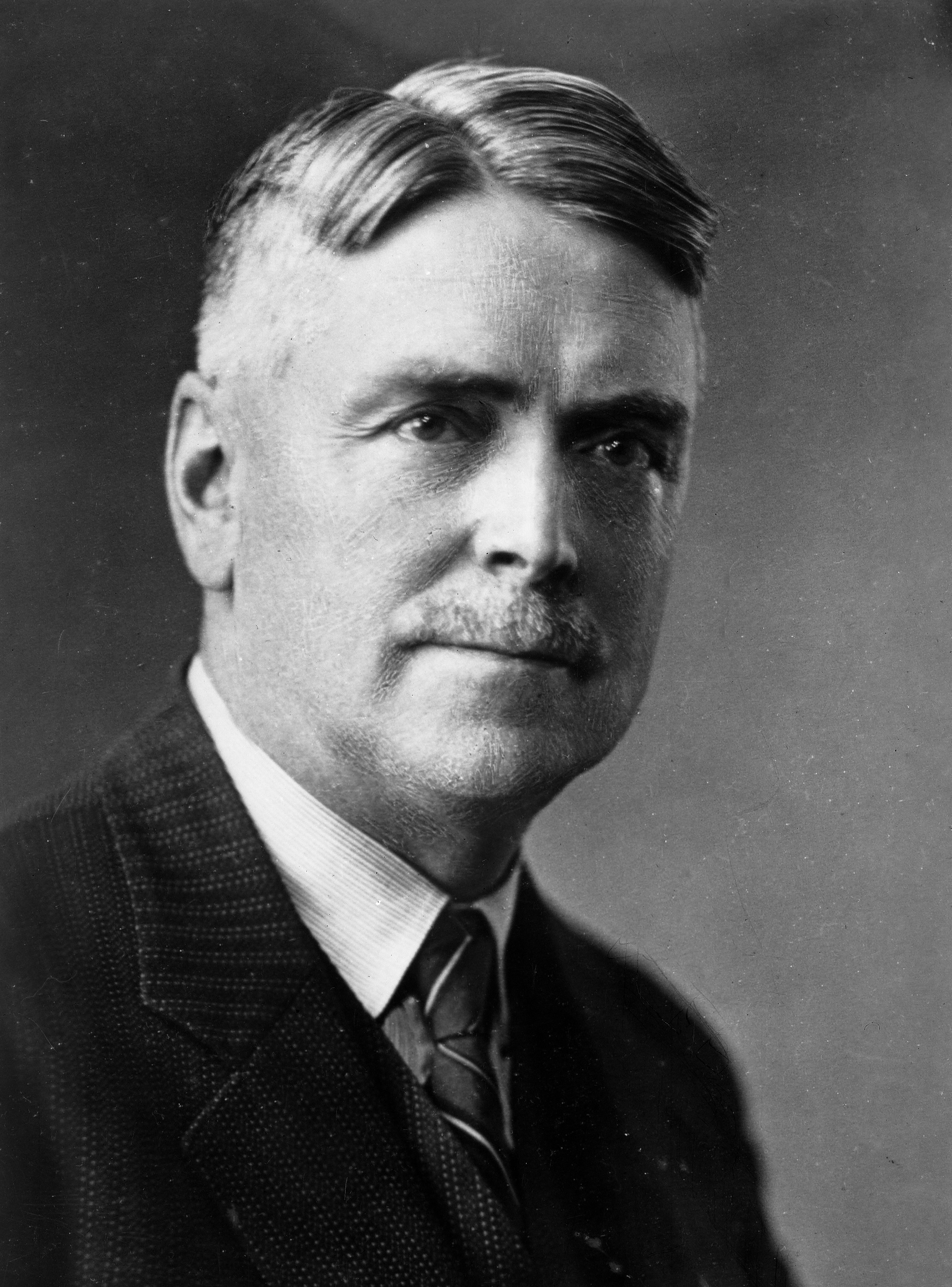
Candidate	George Troup	Walter Nash
Party	Civic League	Labour
Popular vote	14,528	9,142
Percentage	60.82	38.27
Mayor before election
George Troup
Elected mayor
George Troup

The 1929 Wellington mayoral election was part of the New Zealand local elections held that same year. In 1929, elections were held for the Mayor of Wellington plus other local government positions including fifteen councillors. The polling was conducted using the standard first-past-the-post electoral method.

George Troup, the incumbent Mayor, was re-elected to office as Mayor of Wellington, defeating Walter Nash who was his sole opponent.

== Background ==
The Civic League campaign featured support for the Kelburn viaduct project, imposing user pays charges for some city services (such as admittance to the Wellington Zoo) and limiting rates increases. Troup defended his record as mayor. While welcoming scrutiny he stated that much criticisms of the council had been unjust. He stated financial loans had been successful and led to the completion of many public works. Troup downplayed the city's role in dealing with unemployment stating the main responsibility lay with the government. The Labour Party campaigned on increasing the sealing of footpath and streets and the city actively providing relief work to the unemployed. Nash criticised the new rating system on unimproved value. He stated that additional rates collected in the suburbs had resulted in no improvement in suburban infrastructure, with the money instead spent in the central city. He called for the council to immediately reduce electricity prices by one penny per unit, claiming the electricity department would still make a profit. He also said the council should carry its own fire and accident insurance.

== Mayoralty results ==
1929 Wellington mayoral election
Party	Candidate	Votes	%	±%
Civic League	George Troup	14,528	60.82	+6.37
Labour	Walter Nash	9,142	38.27	
Informal votes		214	0.89	
Majority		5,386	22.55	+13.64
Turnout		23,884	51.55	−3.31

== Councillor results ==
1929 Wellington City Council election
Party	Candidate	Votes	%	±%
Civic League	Thomas Hislop	12,338	52.22	+1.99
Civic League	William Gaudin	11,447	48.45	−1.36
Civic League	Robert Wright	11,395	48.23	
Civic League	William Bennett	11,300	47.82	−1.78
Civic League	Charlton Morpeth	10,682	45.21	+13.13
Labour	Charles Chapman	10,681	45.20	
Civic League	Martin Luckie	10,645	45.05	−2.54
Civic League	Frank Meadowcroft	10,634	45.00	+0.89
Civic League	Thomas Forsyth	10,498	44.43	
Civic League	Herbert Huggins	10,205	43.19	−3.08
Civic League	Benjamin Burn	9,946	42.09	1.46
Labour	Robert McKeen	9,870	41.77	−2.87
Civic League	William Hildreth	9,870	41.77	
Labour	Bob Semple	9,329	39.48	−9.29
Civic League	George Mitchell	9,082	38.44	−11.18
Independent	Henry Bennett	8,732	36.95	−11.75
Civic League	Alexander Blake	8,057	34.10	
Independent	John Burns	7,405	31.34	−15.62
Independent	Richard McVilly	7,248	30.67	−14.52
Civic League	Edward Thornton	7,173	30.36	
Civic League	Frederick Boyd	7,094	30.02	
Labour	John Read	7,086	29.99	
Labour	Tom Brindle	7,017	29.70	−1.53
Labour	William Atkinson	6,942	29.38	
Labour	Walter Bromley	6,816	28.84	−2.78
Labour	Andrew Parlane	6,421	27.17	−3.96
Labour	Jim Thorn	6,305	26.68	
Labour	Peter Butler	6,196	26.22	
Labour	Adam Black	6,125	25.92	
Labour	Michael Walsh	6,191	26.20	
Labour	John Tucker	6,089	25.77	
Labour	Henry Lees	5,212	22.06	
Labour	George Whippy	5,162	21.84	
Independent	William Duncan	5,114	21.64	
Independent	Matthew Thew	3,189	13.49	
