= 1941 Wellington mayoral election =

New Zealand local election

← 1938	17 May 1941	1944 →
- Turnout: 31,158 (51.51%)
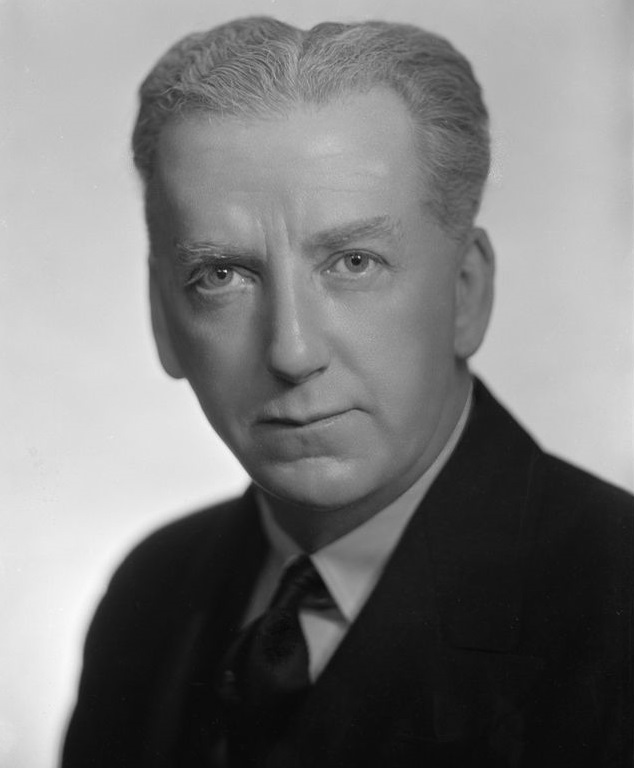

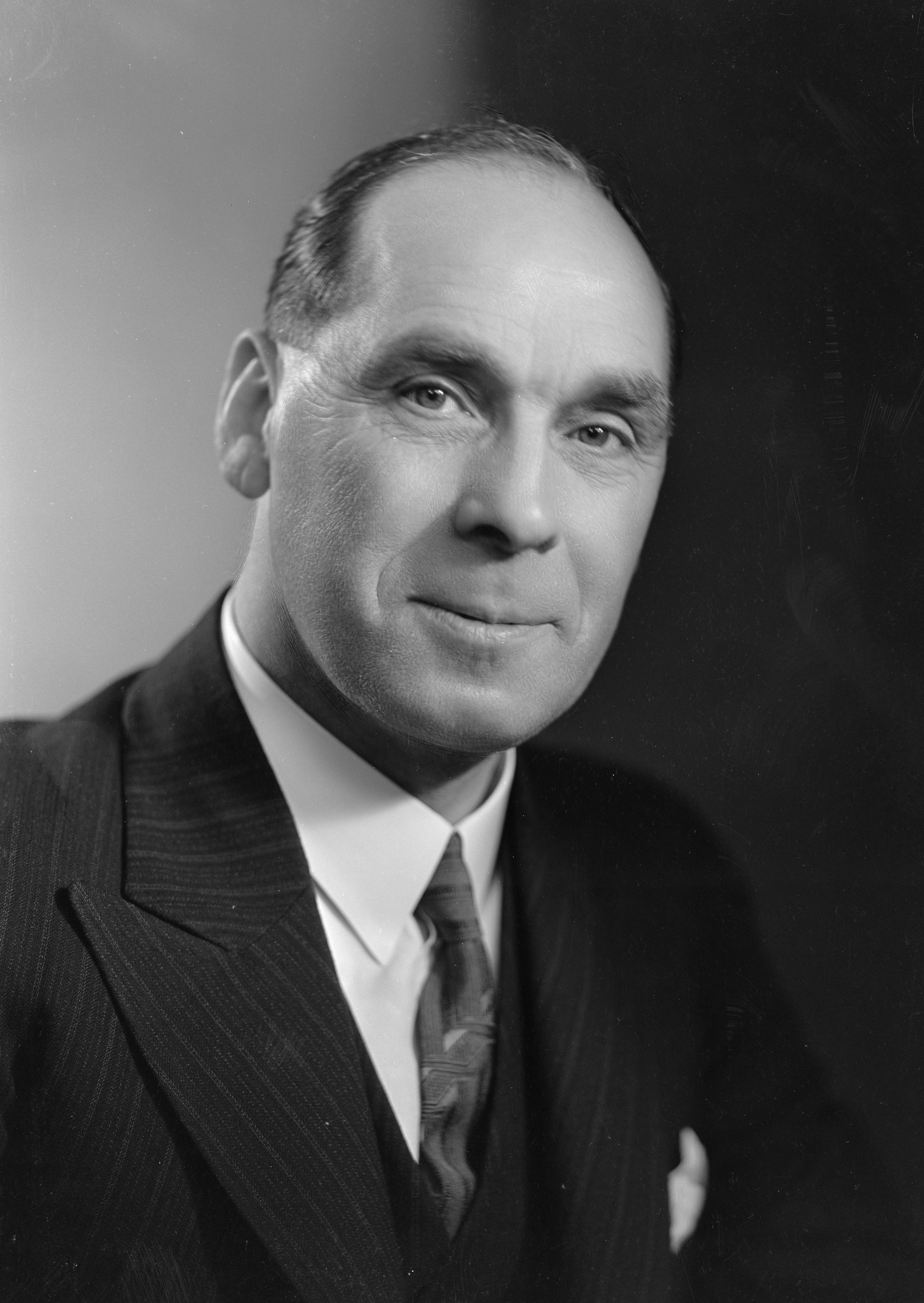
Candidate	Thomas Hislop	Robert McKeen
Party	Citizens'	Labour
Popular vote	19,919	10,978
Percentage	63.92	35.23
Mayor before election
Thomas Hislop
Elected mayor
Thomas Hislop

The 1941 Wellington mayoral election was part of the New Zealand local elections held that same year. In 1941, elections were held for the Mayor of Wellington and fifteen city councillors plus seats on the Wellington Hospital Board and Wellington Harbour Board. The polling was conducted using the standard first-past-the-post electoral method.

== Background ==
After receiving a large public deputation, which encouraged him to run for another term, Thomas Hislop stated he would stand again. The Labour Party selected current councillor and MP Robert McKeen as its mayoral candidate.

While residents as well as ratepayers had been able to vote in local elections since 1910, in this election tenants of state houses throughout New Zealand were made borough electors as though they were ratepayers (though they did not pay rates directly to councils, which were paid by central government). This meant that there was no qualifying period of residence for them, though they did not acquire the ratepayers' right to vote on loan or rating proposals.

=== The 'Nathan Incident' ===
The election resulted in a landslide victory for the right-leaning local ticket the Citizens' Association with their candidates capturing all council seats and the mayoralty, blitzing the Labour Party. This resulted from a scandal involving Hubert Nathan, a Citizens candidate for the Wellington Harbour Board and a stockbroker. Like other Citizens candidates, he had been critical of the number of union secretaries on the Labour ticket, asking how they could serve ratepayers and the city while dependent on the unions for their jobs. Nathan agreed to a visit on Friday 9 May by a union official and an associate, but that afternoon five men called and used "Gestapo tactics" according to Nathan. They reviling him because he was a Jew and saying no Jew should hold any public position, as well as saying they would stop him travelling or getting deliveries unless he apologised and withdrew in writing. On Wednesday 14 May after four days his account was splashed over the papers, giving the unions little time to respond. The Labour Representation Committee said his accusations were "hardly credible" but newspaper editorials condemned the use of union power to victimise opponents. No Labour candidate was returned to any of the three authorities, though McKeen (as highest polling unsuccessful candidate) was appointed to the Council in 1942 to fill a vacancy caused by Len McKenzie's death.

It was nine years before a Labour candidate was again elected to the Council. The Citizens' clean sweep included Elizabeth Gilmer an active conservationist and daughter of Richard Seddon. Labour also lost all seats on the Wellington Hospital Board, although the board still had Labour representatives from Mākara, Petone and Johnsonville.

== Mayoralty results ==
1941 Wellington mayoral election
Party	Candidate	Votes	%	±%
Citizens'	Thomas Hislop	19,919	63.92	+7.07
Labour	Robert McKeen	10,978	35.23	
Informal votes		261	0.83	+0.15
Majority		8,941	28.69	+14.30
Turnout		31,158	51.51	−4.85

== Councillor results ==
1941 Wellington City Council election
Party	Candidate	Votes	%	±%
Citizens'	Robert Wright	19,468	62.48	+7.59
Citizens'	Will Appleton	19,038	61.10	+9.55
Citizens'	Malcolm Fraser	18,293	58.71	+7.51
Citizens'	Elizabeth Gilmer	18,248	58.56	
Citizens'	Martin Luckie	18,150	58.25	+8.06
Citizens'	William Gaudin	17,933	57.55	+7.14
Citizens'	William Duncan	17,599	56.48	+7.25
Citizens'	Len McKenzie	17,266	55.41	+6.76
Citizens'	Robert Macalister	17,225	55.28	+9.35
Citizens'	Bryan Todd	16,944	54.38	
Citizens'	Robert Nimmo	16,863	54.12	
Citizens'	Frederick Furkert	16,664	53.48	
Citizens'	Charles Bowden	16,416	52.68	
Citizens'	William Stevens	15,055	48.31	
Citizens'	James Sievwright	14,512	46.57	
Labour	Robert McKeen (Note: McKeen was appointed to fill the vacancy on the council in 1942 caused by Len McKenzie's death)	12,517	40.17	−14.56
Labour	Charles Chapman	11,715	37.95	−13.95
Labour	Tom Brindle	10,779	34.59	−13.20
Labour	Peter Butler	10,706	34.36	−14.39
Labour	Adam Black	10,383	33.32	−12.91
Labour	Margaret Semple	10,379	33.31	−14.31
Labour	Catherine Stewart	9,947	31.92	
Labour	Roy Holland	9,787	31.41	
Labour	William Atkinson	9,643	30.94	
Labour	Andrew Parlane	9,636	30.92	−13.44
Labour	John Read	9,307	29.87	−13.80
Labour	Jim Collins	9,214	29.57	−13.29
Labour	John Fleming	8,820	28.30	
Labour	Harold Aspen	8,389	26.92	
Labour	Percival Hansen	8,158	26.18	
Independent	Leslie Austin	3,607	11.57	−8.62
Independent	Charlie Teece	3,230	10.36	
Independent	Arthur Carman	2,239	7.18	
Independent	Daniel Campbell	2,096	6.72	
Communist	Alexander Galbraith	2,007	6.44	
Communist	Connie Birchfield	1,731	5.55	
Communist	William Wood	1,713	5.49	
Communist	Jessie Probyn	1,081	3.46	−1.70

Table footnotes:
