= Electoral history of Peter Fraser =

List of elections featuring Peter Fraser as a candidate

This is a summary of the electoral history of Peter Fraser, Prime Minister of New Zealand (1940–49), Leader of the Labour Party (1940–50) and Member of Parliament for Wellington Central (1918–46) then Brooklyn (1946–50).

== Parliamentary elections ==
=== 1918 by-election ===
1918 Wellington Central by-election
Party	Candidate	Votes	%	±%
Labour	Peter Fraser	2,668	56.54	
Independent Labour	Joe Mack	1,044	22.12	
Liberal	William Hildreth	784	16.61	
Independent	Harry Atmore	185	3.92	
Independent	Lindsay John Frederick Garmston	29	0.61	
Independent	William Cyril Tanner	9	0.19	
Majority		1,624	34.41	
Turnout		4,719	51.43	−33.04
Registered electors		9,176		
Labour gain from Liberal		Swing		

=== 1919 election ===
1919 general election: Wellington Central
Party	Candidate	Votes	%	±%
Labour	Peter Fraser	4,486	57.33	+0.79
Liberal	Frederick Pirani	3,430	42.67	
Majority		1,146	14.64	−19.77
Turnout		7,826		

=== 1922 election ===
1922 general election: Wellington Central
Party	Candidate	Votes	%	±%
Labour	Peter Fraser	5,827	64.73	+7.40
Independent	William Bennett	1,625	18.05	
Liberal–Labour	Archie Sievwright	1,550	17.21	
Majority		4,202	46.67	+32.03
Informal votes		102	1.13	
Turnout		9,002		

=== 1925 election ===
1925 general election: Wellington Central
Party	Candidate	Votes	%	±%
Labour	Peter Fraser	5,459	64.02	−0.71
Reform	Dunbar Sloane	3,069	35.98	
Majority		2,390	28.02	−18.65
Turnout		8,528		

=== 1928 election ===
1928 general election: Wellington Central
Party	Candidate	Votes	%	±%
Labour	Peter Fraser	7,353	60.81	−3.21
Reform	Dunbar Sloane	3,895	32.21	−3.77
Independent Labour	Margaret Young	843	6.97	
Majority		3,458	28.60	+0.58
Informal votes		145	1.19	
Turnout		12,236	83.61	
Registered electors		14,635		

=== 1931 election ===
1931 general election: Wellington Central
Party	Candidate	Votes	%	±%
Labour	Peter Fraser	6,308	57.26	−3.55
United	Robert Darroch	3,837	34.83	
Independent	Edward William Nicolaus	688	6.25	
Communist	Richard Francis Griffin	183	1.66	
Majority		2,471	22.43	−6.17
Informal votes		91	0.82	−0.37
Turnout		11,107	74.82	−8.79
Registered electors		14,845		

=== 1935 election ===
1935 general election: Wellington Central
Party	Candidate	Votes	%	±%
Labour	Peter Fraser	7,673	69.43	12.17
Reform	Will Mason	3,380	30.57	
Majority		4,293	38.84	+16.41
Turnout		11,053		

=== 1938 election ===
1938 general election: Wellington Central
Party	Candidate	Votes	%	±%
Labour	Peter Fraser	9,376	62.86	−6.19
National	Will Appleton	5,539	37.14	
Majority		3,837	25.73	−12.37
Informal votes		89	0.59	
Turnout		15,004	86.74	+5.05
Registered electors		17,297		

=== 1943 election ===
1943 general election: Wellington Central
Party	Candidate	Votes	%	±%
Labour	Peter Fraser	6,822	46.12	−16.74
National	Will Appleton	5,616	37.97	+0.83
Independent	Colin Scrimgeour	2,253	15.23	
Independent	Julius Hyde	100	0.68	
Majority		1,206	8.15	−17.57
Informal votes		223	1.49	+0.89
Turnout		15,014	80.59	+6.15
Registered electors		18,629		

=== 1946 election ===
1946 general election: Brooklyn
Party	Candidate	Votes	%	±%
Labour	Peter Fraser	8,216	65.75	
National	Stewart Hardy	4,281	34.45	
Majority		3,935	31.48	
Turnout		12,497	87.09	
Registered electors		14,349		

=== 1949 election ===
1949 general election: Brooklyn
Party	Candidate	Votes	%	±%
Labour	Peter Fraser	7,176	63.91	−1.84
National	Berta Burns	4,220	37.58	
Communist	Connie Birchfield	241	2.14	
Majority		2,956	26.32	−5.16
Turnout		11,228	85.73	−1.36
Registered electors		13,096		

== Local elections ==
=== 1923 local elections ===
1923 Wellington City mayoral election
Party	Candidate	Votes	%	±%
Civic League	Robert Wright	10,876	42.30	−23.30
Labour	Peter Fraser	10,603	41.24	
Independent	Len McKenzie	4,228	16.44	
Majority		273	1.06	−29.60
Turnout		25,707		

=== 1933 council by-election ===
1933 Wellington City Council by-election
Party	Candidate	Votes	%	±%
Labour	Peter Fraser	11,607	48.64	
Citizens'	Robert Wright	11,288	47.31	
Independent	John Castle	517	2.16	
Communist	Richard Webb	311	1.30	−13.81
Informal votes		136	0.57	
Majority		319	1.33	
Turnout		23,859	42.94	

=== 1933 local elections ===
Wellington Harbour Board, Wellington
Party	Candidate	Votes	%	±%
Labour	Peter Fraser	13,068	57.79	
Labour	Charles Chapman	12,661	55.99	+6.03
Citizens'	Charles Norwood	11,199	49.53	−6.21
Labour	Bob Semple	11,028	48.77	
Citizens'	William Bennett	10,702	47.33	
Citizens'	Francis Arthur Mcindoe	9,799	43.33	
Citizens'	Robert Nimmo	8,069	35.68	
Labour	Michael Walsh	7,992	35.34	+7.67
Independent	Robert Darroch	4,204	18.59	
Informal votes		1,180	5.21	+0.01
Turnout		22,610		

=== 1935 local elections ===
Wellington Harbour Board, Wellington
Party	Candidate	Votes	%	±%
Labour	Peter Fraser	25,428	66.30	+8.51
Labour	Charles Chapman	21,627	56.39	+0.40
Labour	Robert McKeen	21,380	55.75	
Labour	Bob Semple	21,142	55.13	
Citizens'	Charles Norwood	17,920	46.72	−2.81
Citizens'	Will Appleton	16,663	43.45	
Citizens'	Robert Nimmo	14,651	38.20	−2.52
Citizens'	Hubert Nathan	13,815	36.02	
Informal votes		770	2.00	−3.21
Turnout		38,349		

== Leadership elections ==
=== 1933 Deputy-leadership election ===
Labour Party deputy-leadership election 1933
Candidate	Votes	%
Peter Fraser	24	100.0
Turnout	24	—N/a

=== 1940 Leadership election ===
Labour Party leadership election 1940
Candidate	Votes	%
Peter Fraser	33	68.7
Gervan McMillan	12	25.0
Clyde Carr	3	6.2
Majority	21	34.4
Turnout	48	—N/a
