= 1938 Wellington mayoral election =

New Zealand local election

- 11 May 1938
- Turnout: 42,860 (56.36%)
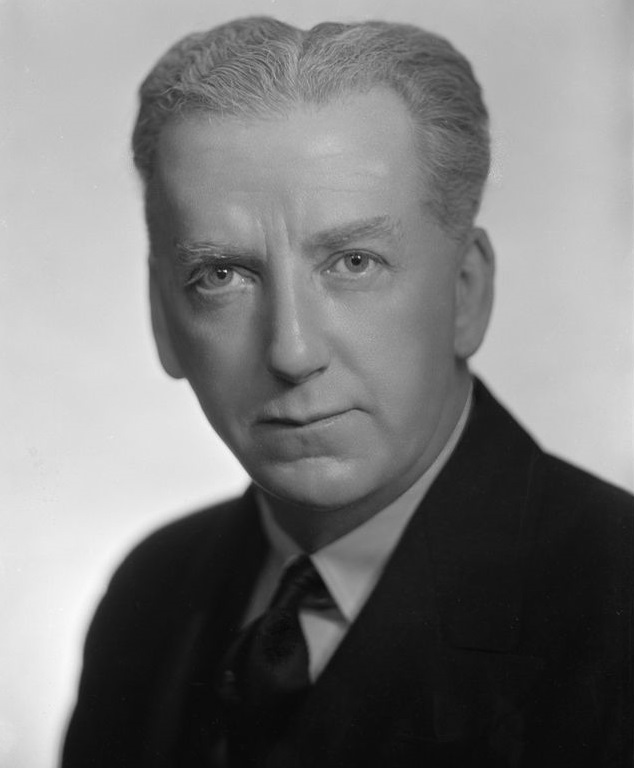

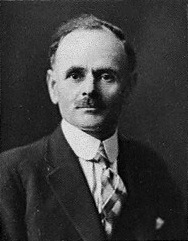
| Candidate | Thomas Hislop | Charles Chapman |
| Party | Citizens' | Labour |
| Popular vote | 24,368 | 18,198 |
| Percentage | 56.85 | 42.45 |
Mayor before election
Thomas Hislop
Elected mayor
Thomas Hislop

The 1938 Wellington mayoral election was part of the New Zealand local elections held that year. In 1938, elections were held for the Mayor of Wellington plus other local government positions including fifteen city councillors. The polling was conducted using the standard first-past-the-post electoral method.

The contest resulted in the re-election of incumbent Thomas Hislop who defeated his only competitor Charles Chapman of the Labour Party. Chapman had unsuccessfully run for Mayor three times prior, in 1915, 1925 and 1927. He also stood as a councillor and was successful.

== Mayoralty results ==
1938 Wellington mayoral election
| Party | Candidate | Votes | % | ±% |
|---|---|---|---|---|
| Citizens' | Thomas Hislop | 24,368 | 56.85 | +4.39 |
| Labour | Charles Chapman | 18,198 | 42.45 | |
| Informal votes | | 294 | 0.68 | −0.06 |
| Majority | | 6,170 | 14.39 | +8.72 |
| Turnout | | 42,860 | 56.36 | −4.13 |

== Councillor results ==
1938 Wellington City Council election
| Party | Candidate | Votes | % | ±% |
|---|---|---|---|---|
| Citizens' | Robert Wright | 23,530 | 54.89 | +0.32 |
| Labour | Robert McKeen | 23,458 | 54.73 | −7.42 |
| Labour | Charles Chapman | 22,142 | 51.66 | −11.65 |
| Citizens' | Will Appleton | 22,096 | 51.55 | +5.28 |
| Citizens' | Malcolm Fraser | 21,945 | 51.20 | |
| Citizens' | William Gaudin | 21,609 | 50.41 | +4.37 |
| Citizens' | Martin Luckie | 21,513 | 50.19 | +4.94 |
| Citizens' | William Duncan | 21,103 | 49.23 | +4.73 |
| Labour | Peter Butler | 20,896 | 48.75 | −1.43 |
| Citizens' | Len McKenzie | 20,852 | 48.65 | +3.49 |
| Labour | Tom Brindle | 20,486 | 47.79 | −1.66 |
| Labour | Margaret Semple | 20,410 | 47.62 | |
| Citizens' | Thomas Forsyth | 20,113 | 46.92 | +1.63 |
| Labour | Adam Black | 19,817 | 46.23 | +1.12 |
| Citizens' | Robert Macalister | 19,689 | 45.93 | +4.87 |
| Citizens' | Malcolm Galloway | 19,465 | 45.41 | |
| Citizens' | Vincent Ward | 19,424 | 45.31 | |
| Labour | Andrew Parlane | 19,016 | 44.36 | −0.05 |
| Labour | John Read | 18,719 | 43.67 | −5.62 |
| Labour | Jim Collins | 18,371 | 42.86 | +0.75 |
| Citizens' | Malcolm McCaul | 18,347 | 42.80 | |
| Labour | Ken Baxter | 18,210 | 42.48 | |
| Citizens' | Noel Nelson | 18,180 | 42.41 | |
| Labour | John Tucker | 17,991 | 41.97 | +0.74 |
| Citizens' | Richard McVilly | 17,922 | 41.81 | |
| Labour | Michael Walsh | 17,858 | 41.66 | −0.41 |
| Citizens' | John McLean | 17,730 | 41.36 | |
| Labour | Caryll Hay | 17,497 | 40.82 | +1.10 |
| Labour | William Broadley | 17,191 | 40.10 | |
| Labour | Herbert Swindell | 16,608 | 38.74 | |
| Independent | Leslie Austin | 8,656 | 20.19 | |
| Independent | Jessie Probyn | 2,214 | 5.16 | |
