= 1925 Wellington mayoral election =

New Zealand local election

- 29 April 1925
- Turnout: 24,929 (59.81%)
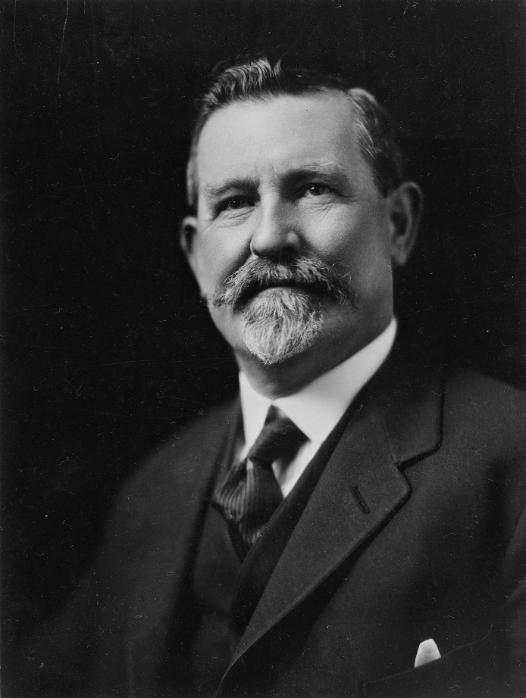

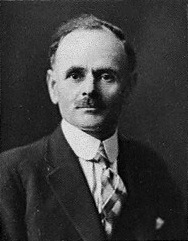
Candidate	Charles Norwood	Charles Chapman
Party	Civic League	Labour
Popular vote	13,180	11,749
Percentage	52.87	47.13
Mayor before election
Robert Wright
Elected mayor
Charles Norwood

The 1925 Wellington mayoral election was part of the New Zealand local elections held that same year. In 1925, elections were held for the Mayor of Wellington plus other local government positions including fifteen councillors. The polling was conducted using the standard first-past-the-post electoral method.

== Background ==
Incumbent Mayor Robert Wright did not seek a third term, but ran as a councillor once again. To replace him, the Civic League initially nominated councillor Thomas Forsyth as their candidate for the mayoralty, but he withdrew in favour of former councillor Charles Norwood. Sitting councillor Charles Chapman was the Labour Party's candidate.

== Mayoralty results ==
1925 Wellington mayoral election
Party	Candidate	Votes	%	±%
Civic League	Charles Norwood	13,180	52.87	
Labour	Charles Chapman	11,749	47.13	
Majority		1,431	5.74	
Turnout		24,929	59.81	+0.55

== Councillor results ==
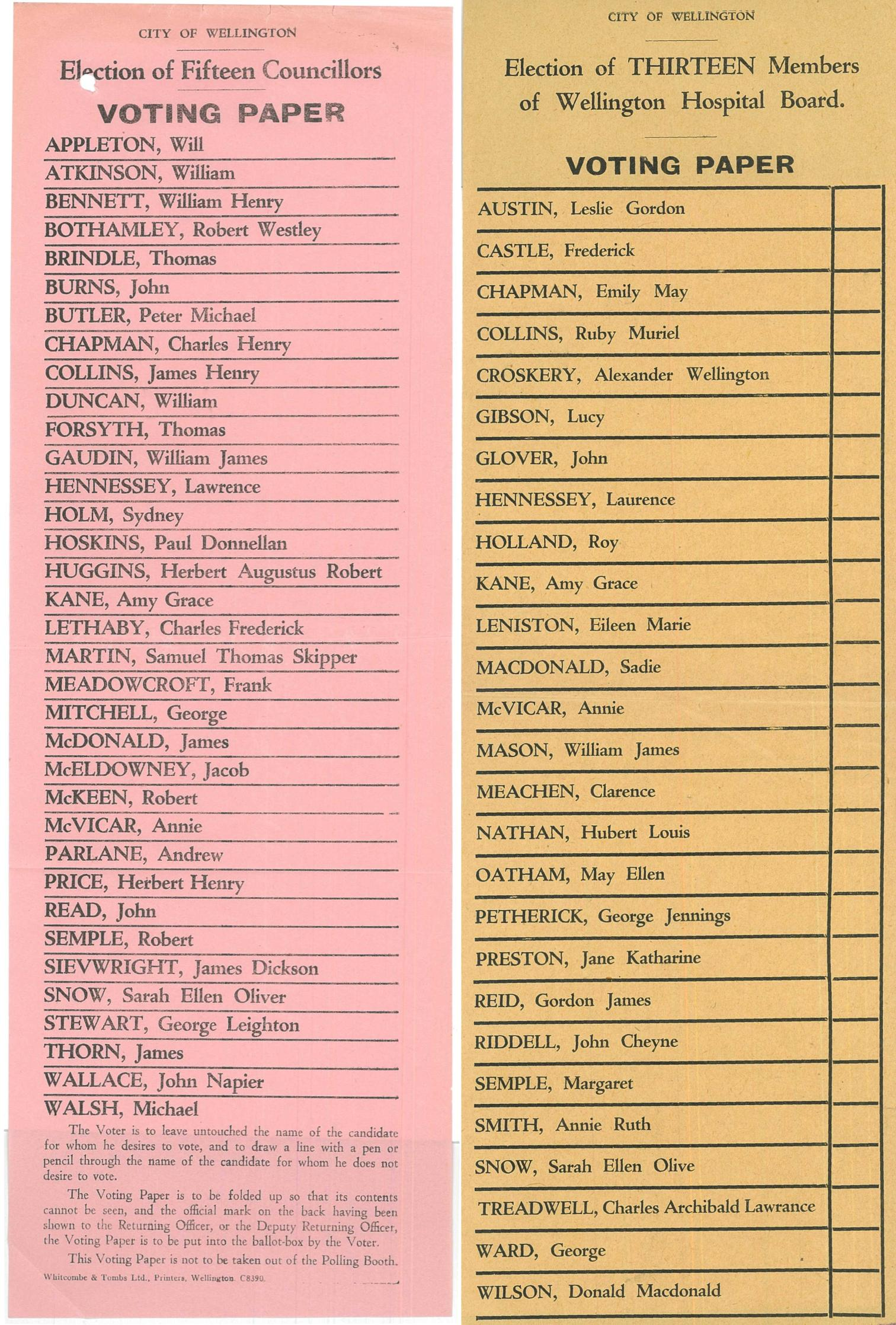
Ballot papers from the election

1925 Wellington City Council election
Party	Candidate	Votes	%	±%
Civic League	William Bennett	12,719	51.02	+2.72
Civic League	Robert Wright	12,543	50.31	
Civic League	Henry Bennett	12,340	49.50	−0.08
Civic League	Martin Luckie	11,890	47.69	+1.19
Civic League	George Troup	11,729	47.04	
Civic League	Frank Meadowcroft	11,539	46.28	−0.39
Labour	Alec Monteith	11,301	45.33	+5.24
Civic League	John Aston	11,220	45.00	+2.88
Civic League	Benjamin Burn	11,156	44.75	−2.26
Civic League	John Burns	11,131	44.65	−1.39
Civic League	Frederick Manton	11,058	44.35	
Civic League	Herbert Huggins	10,638	42.67	+5.32
Labour	Robert McKeen	10,067	40.38	+1.83
Labour	Bob Semple	10,051	40.31	
Civic League	William Thompson	9,762	39.15	2.79
Independent	Thomas Forsyth	9,585	38.44	−10.30
Independent	Len McKenzie	8,961	35.94	
Labour	Alexander Croskery	8,944	35.87	−3.37
Independent	John Castle	8,641	34.66	+2.63
Labour	John Glover	8,603	34.51	+2.47
Labour	Tom Young	8,544	34.27	−2.09
Civic League	Arthur Whyte	8,156	32.71	
Labour	Tom Brindle	8,137	32.64	−1.51
Labour	James McKenzie	7,891	31.65	−2.40
Civic League	Joseph Goldsmith	7,696	30.87	
Labour	John Read	7,624	30.58	
Labour	James Roberts	7,560	30.32	
Labour	Michael Walsh	7,419	29.76	−0.33
Independent	Lewis Glover	7,355	29.50	+0.44
Civic League	Michael Bourke	7,268	29.15	
Labour	Lawrence Hennessy	6,981	28.00	−1.14
Independent	Annie McVicar	6,532	26.20	−12.93
Independent	Margaret Stables	6,382	25.60	
Independent	William Smith	5,891	23.63	
Independent	Joseph Salmon	4,592	18.42	
Independent	James Sievwright	4,585	18.39	
