= 1944 Wellington mayoral election =

New Zealand local election

← 1941	27 May 1944	1947 →
- Turnout: 50,841 (58.87%)
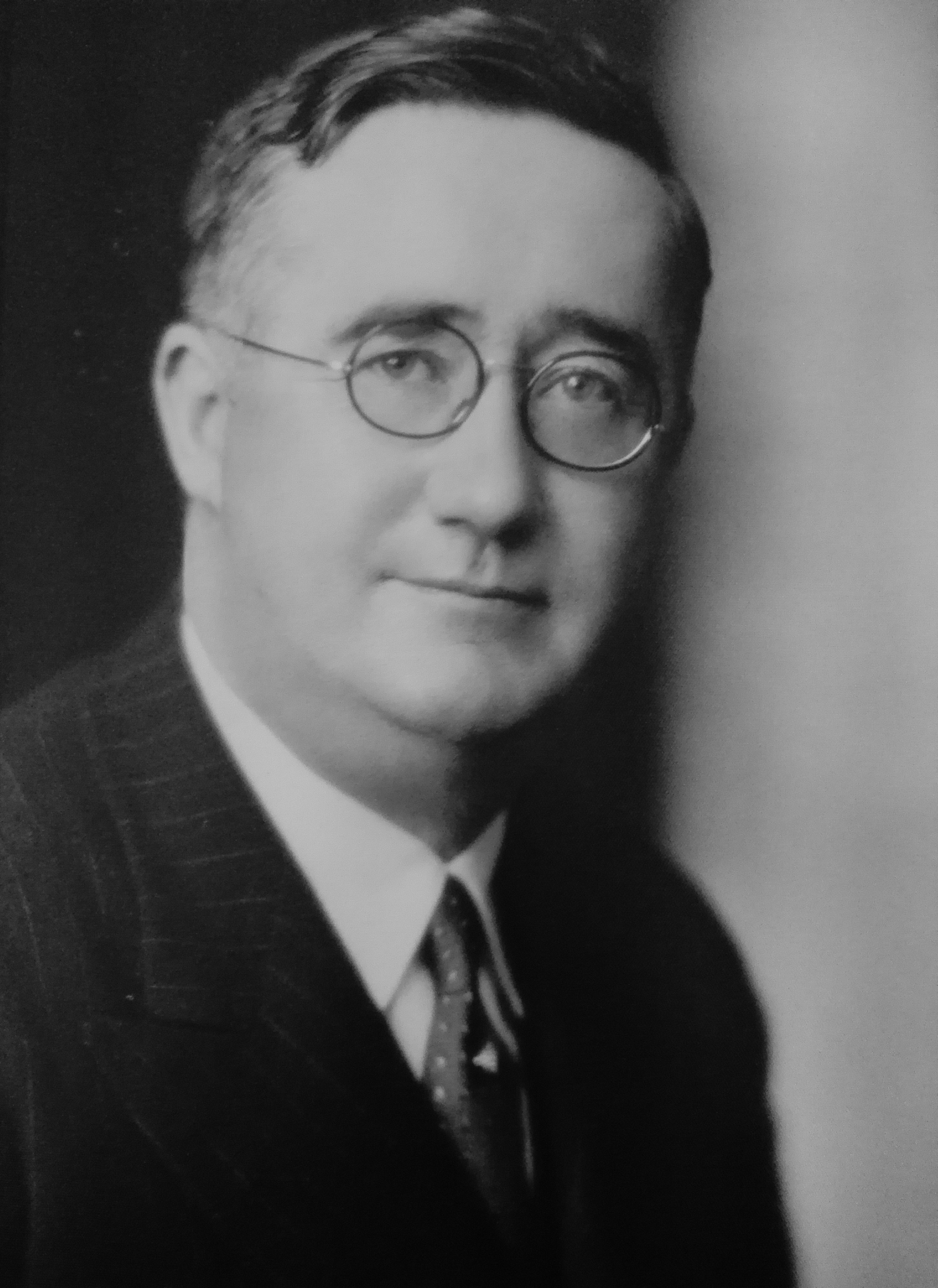

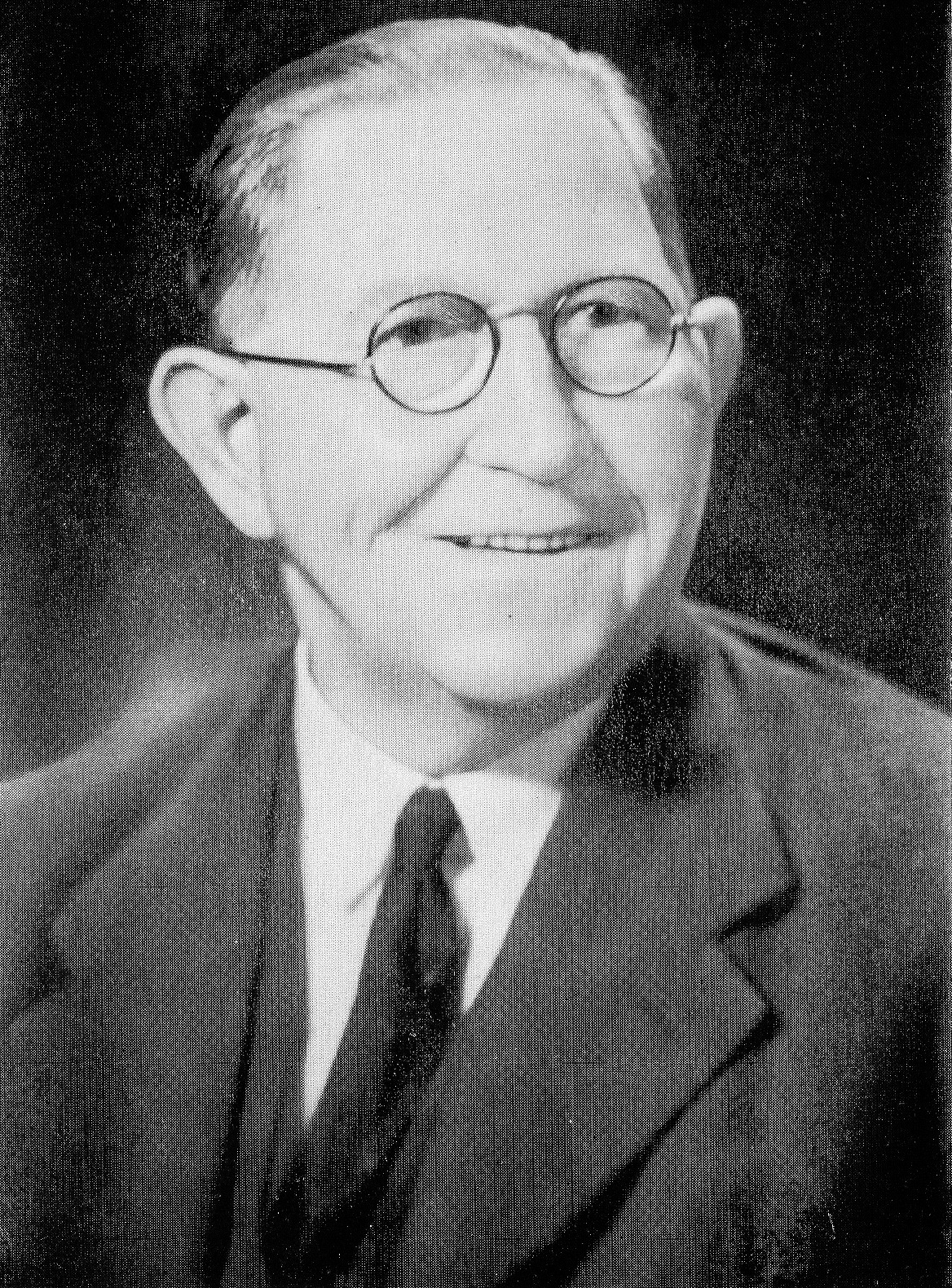
Candidate	Will Appleton	James Roberts
Party	Citizens'	Labour
Popular vote	29,899	20,323
Percentage	58.80	39.99
Mayor before election
Thomas Hislop
Elected mayor
Will Appleton

The 1944 Wellington mayoral election was part of the New Zealand local elections held that same year. In 1944, election were held for the Mayor of Wellington plus other local government positions including fifteen city councillors. The polling was conducted using the standard first-past-the-post electoral method.

The incumbent Mayor, Thomas Hislop did not stand for another term. Instead, Will Appleton stood as the candidate for the Citizens' Association. Trade unionist James Roberts who was the President of the Labour Party was his Party's candidate.

== Background ==
Citizens'
Three members of the Citizens' Association were nominated for the mayoralty:

- Will Appleton, city councillor since 1931 and chairman of the council Works Committee
- Thomas Hislop, the Mayor of Wellington since 1931
- William Gaudin, city councillor since 1927 and chairman of the council Libraries Committee

Despite the open challenge to him Hislop (who had been mayor for 13 years) was again selected by a ballot of the Citizens' Electoral Committee. Appleton said he would stand for mayor as an independent despite not being granted the Citizens' nomination in pursuance of a promise he gave to a deputation of over 100 people who implored him to stand. This caused concern for the Citizens' Association of vote splitting and a repeat of the 1912 election where competing centre-right candidates allowed a Labour mayor to be elected. Declining arbitration, Appleton got his wish after discussions when Hislop (albeit reluctantly) agreed to stand aside in the interests of unity.

Labour
The Labour Party had five people nominated for the mayoralty:

- Peter Butler, secretary of the Wellington General Labourers' Union and former city councillor (1933–41)
- Charles Chapman, MP for Wellington North since 1928 and ex-city councillor (1919–25, 1929–41)
- Harry Combs, MP for Wellington Suburbs since 1938
- Robert McKeen, MP for Wellington South since 1922 and former city councillor (1925–41)
- James Roberts, the President of the Labour Party since 1937

McKeen and later Combs declined nomination and withdrew from the process. At a selection meeting 87 delegates, representing approximately 30,000 members, selected Roberts ahead of Butler and Chapman in an exhaustive ballot. The Communist Party did not contest the mayoralty and decided to endorse Roberts stating the party supported the election of a Labour mayor.

== Mayoralty results ==
1944 Wellington mayoral election
Party	Candidate	Votes	%	±%
Citizens'	Will Appleton	29,899	58.80	
Labour	James Roberts	20,323	39.99	
Informal votes		619	1.21	+0.38
Majority		9,576	18.83	
Turnout		50,841	58.87	+7.36

== Councillor results ==
1944 Wellington City Council election
Party	Candidate	Votes	%	±%
Citizens'	Elizabeth Gilmer	29,785	59.36	+0.20
Citizens'	Robert Wright	29,413	58.62	−3.86
Citizens'	Malcolm Fraser	28,998	57.79	−0.92
Citizens'	William Gaudin	27,816	55.44	−2.11
Citizens'	Martin Luckie	27,757	55.32	−2.93
Citizens'	Robert Macalister	27,120	54.05	−1.23
Citizens'	Frederick Furkert	27,068	53.94	+0.46
Citizens'	Bryan Todd	26,609	53.03	−1.35
Citizens'	Malcolm Galloway	26,578	52.97	
Citizens'	George Amos	26,101	52.02	
Citizens'	Ernest Toop	25,441	50.70	
Citizens'	Len Jacobsen	25,101	50.02	
Citizens'	Sandy Pope	25,046	49.91	
Citizens'	William Stevens	24,192	48.21	−0.10
Citizens'	James Sievwright	23,823	47.48	−0.91
Labour	Charles Chapman	20,857	41.57	+3.62
Labour	John Churchill	19,320	38.50	
Labour	Roy Holland	19,224	38.31	+6.90
Labour	Tom Brindle	18,594	37.05	+2.46
Labour	Lettie Allen	18,102	36.07	
Labour	John Fleming	18,023	35.92	+7.62
Labour	Andrew Parlane	17,627	35.13	+4.21
Labour	Jack Arthurs	17,186	34.25	
Labour	Reg Stillwell	16,890	33.66	
Labour	Percival Hansen	16,779	33.44	+7.26
Labour	Toby Hill	16,701	33.28	
Labour	Caryll Hay	16,381	32.64	
Labour	Catherine Stewart	16,243	32.37	+0.45
Labour	Ethel Harris	16,191	32.27	
Labour	George Mathew	14,430	28.76	
Communist	Harold Silverstone	9,765	19.46	
Independent	Amy Kane	9,583	19.09	
Independent	Arthur Carman	5,543	11.04	+3.86
Independent	John Parry	4,785	9.53	
