= 1927 Wellington mayoral election =

New Zealand local election

- 3 May 1927
- Turnout: 23,043 (54.86%)
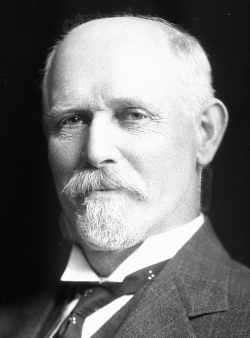

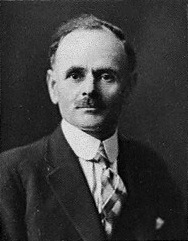
| Candidate | George Troup | Charles Chapman |
| Party | Civic League | Labour |
| Popular vote | 12,549 | 10,494 |
| Percentage | 54.45 | 45.55 |
Mayor before election
Charles Norwood
Elected mayor
George Troup

The 1927 Wellington mayoral election was part of the New Zealand local elections held that same year. In 1927, elections were held for the Mayor of Wellington plus other local government positions including fifteen councillors. The polling was conducted using the standard first-past-the-post electoral method.

== Background ==
Mayor Charles Norwood declined to stand for a second term. In an open contest, architect and city councillor George Troup was elected mayor, defeating trade unionist and former councillor Charles Chapman.

== Mayoralty results ==
1927 Wellington mayoral election
| Party | Candidate | Votes | % | ±% |
|---|---|---|---|---|
| Civic League | George Troup | 12,549 | 54.45 | |
| Labour | Charles Chapman | 10,494 | 45.55 | −1.58 |
| Majority | | 2,055 | 8.91 | |
| Turnout | | 23,043 | 54.86 | −4.95 |

== Councillor results ==
1927 Wellington City Council election
| Party | Candidate | Votes | % | ±% |
|---|---|---|---|---|
| Civic League | Thomas Hislop | 11,575 | 50.23 | |
| Civic League | William Gaudin | 11,479 | 49.81 | |
| Civic League | George Mitchell | 11,435 | 49.62 | |
| Civic League | William Bennett | 11,340 | 49.60 | −1.42 |
| Labour | Bob Semple | 11,286 | 48.77 | +8.46 |
| Independent | Henry Bennett | 11,223 | 48.70 | −0.80 |
| Civic League | Martin Luckie | 10,984 | 47.66 | −0.03 |
| Civic League | John Burns | 10,823 | 46.96 | +5.31 |
| Civic League | Herbert Huggins | 10,664 | 46.27 | +3.60 |
| Civic League | John Caughley | 10,415 | 45.19 | |
| Civic League | Richard McVilly | 10,415 | 45.19 | |
| Labour | Robert McKeen | 10,288 | 44.64 | +4.26 |
| Civic League | Frank Meadowcroft | 10,165 | 44.11 | −2.17 |
| Civic League | Benjamin Burn | 10,036 | 43.55 | −1.20 |
| Civic League | John Aston | 9,600 | 41.66 | −3.34 |
| Labour | John Glover | 9,084 | 39.42 | +4.91 |
| Independent | Frederick Manton | 8,902 | 38.63 | |
| Labour | Walter Nash | 8,816 | 38.25 | |
| Civic League | John Wallace | 7,629 | 33.10 | |
| Civic League | James Doherty | 7,503 | 32.56 | |
| Independent | Charlton Morpeth | 7,393 | 32.08 | |
| Civic League | Gilbert Fownes | 7,353 | 31.90 | |
| Labour | Walter Bromley | 7,287 | 31.62 | |
| Labour | Tom Brindle | 7,198 | 31.23 | −1.41 |
| Labour | Andrew Parlane | 7,174 | 31.13 | |
| Labour | Tom Young | 7,101 | 31.13 | −3.14 |
| Labour | Lawrence Hennessy | 7,004 | 30.81 | +2.81 |
| Labour | Allison Murray | 6,102 | 26.48 | |
| Labour | Charles Baker | 6,000 | 26.03 | |
| Independent | Percy Brady | 4,345 | 18.85 | |
| Independent | Archibald Whitelaw | 4,245 | 18.42 | |
| Communist | Fred Freeman | 3,704 | 16.07 | |
