= 1918 Wellington South by-election =

New Zealand by-election

- 19 December 1918
- Turnout: 4,112 (42.51%)
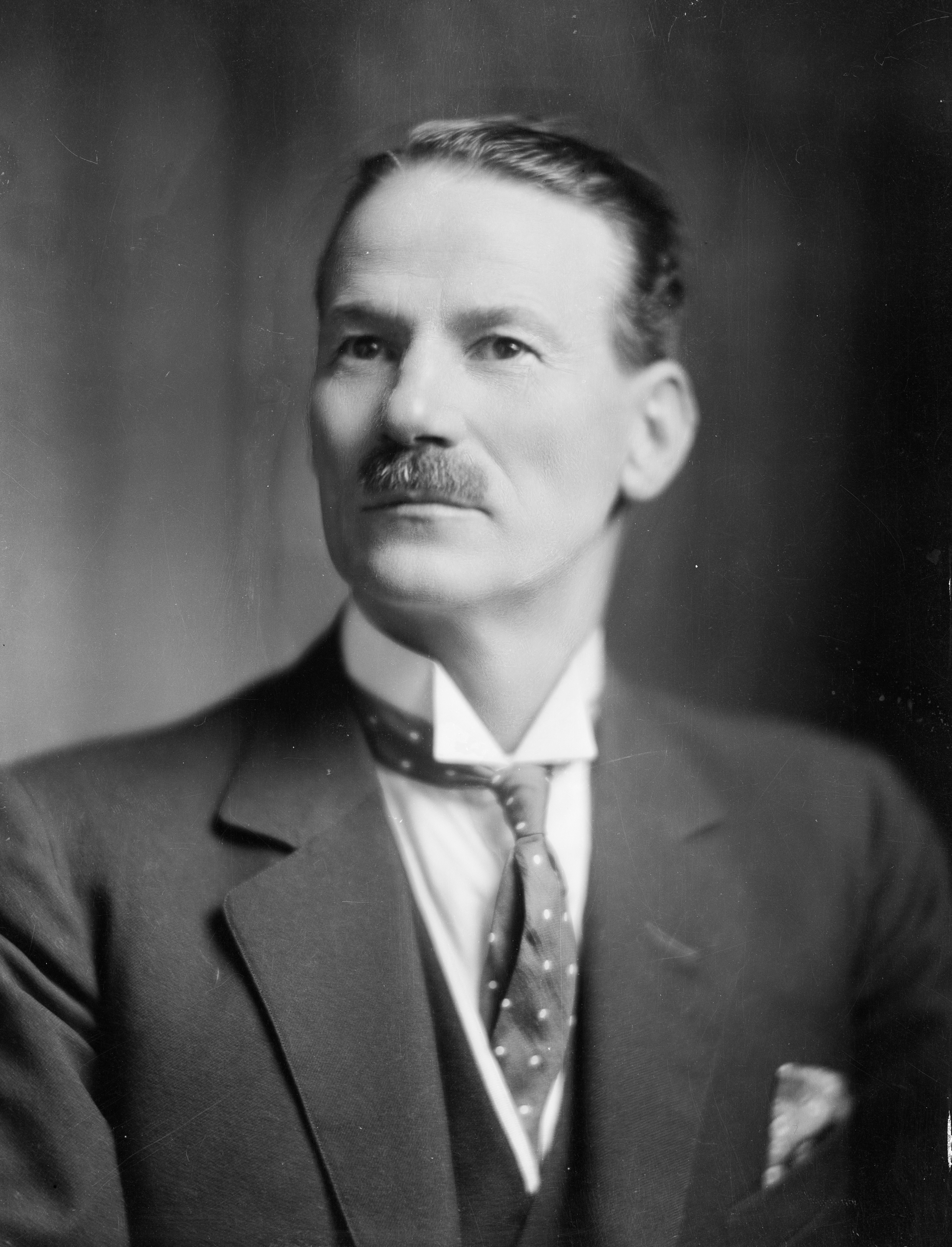

Candidate	Bob Semple	George Frost
Party	Labour	Reform
Popular vote	2,411	1,286
Percentage	58.63%	31.27%
Member before election
Alfred Hindmarsh
Labour
Elected Member
Bob Semple
Labour

The Wellington South by-election of 1918 was a by-election held in the Wellington South electorate during the 19th New Zealand Parliament, on 19 December 1918. It was caused by the death of incumbent MP Alfred Hindmarsh, the leader of the Labour Party and was won by fellow party member Bob Semple with a majority of 1,231.

== Background ==
Bob Semple, a miners agent who was previously the organiser of the New Zealand Federation of Labour, was selected as the Labour Party candidate. The nomination was subject of much interest. The unsuccessful aspirants were Tom Brindle, Alec Monteith, John Read, Michael Reardon and Tom Young.

Two Wellington City Councillors also stood as candidates. George Frost and John Castle offered themselves to the electorate, with Frost being endorsed by the Reform Party.

== Results ==
The following table gives the election results:

1918 Wellington South by-election
Party	Candidate	Votes	%	±%
Labour	Bob Semple	2,411	58.63	
Reform	George Frost	1,286	31.27	
Independent	John Castle	398	9.67	
Informal votes		17	0.41	−0.37
Majority		1,125	27.35	
Turnout		4,112	42.51	−43.78
Registered electors		9,673		

== Aftermath ==
Semple held the electorate only until the next election when he was defeated by George Mitchell.
