= Margaret Semple =

New Zealand socialist and politician (1876–1967)

Margaret Semple JP
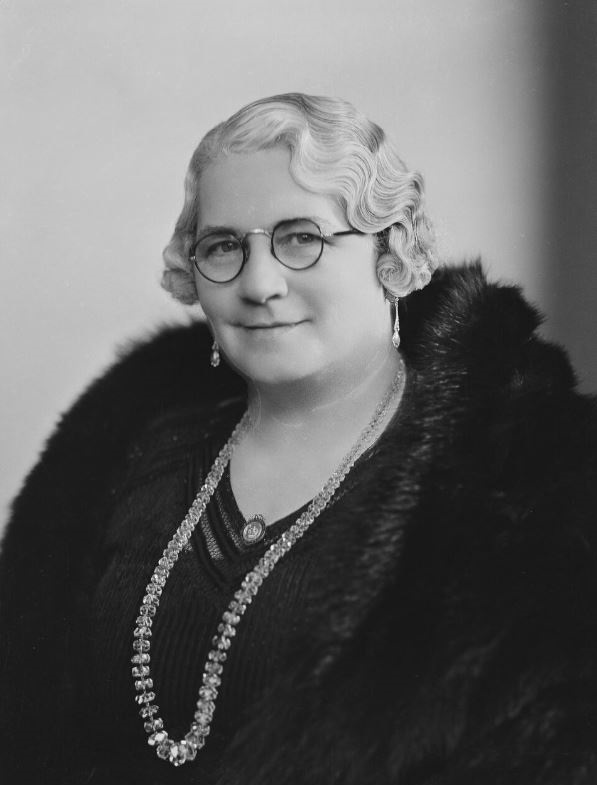

Wellington City Councillor
- In office 11 May 1938 – 17 May 1941
- Constituency: At-large

Personal details
- Born: 1876 Bluff, New Zealand
- Died: 3 September 1967 (aged 90–91) Wellington, New Zealand
- Party: Labour
- Spouse: Bob Semple
- Children: 4

Margaret Semple JP (née McNair, 1876 – 3 September 1967) was a New Zealand socialist and local politician. She was married to Bob Semple, a Labour Party Cabinet Minister.

== Biography ==
=== Early life ===
Margaret was born in 1876 to Thomas and Agnes McNair who both emigrated from Lanarkshire, Scotland to Otago, New Zealand. Her mother died in 1887 after which her father took the family to Victoria, Australia. Margaret married Bob Semple, a coal miner and unionist, at Outtrim, Victoria, on 27 June 1898. She gave birth to their first child a year later. The Semples initially lived in Western Australia, but when Margaret fell sick, they had to return to Victoria. She was friends with Margaret Thorn who labelled her a "capable woman" referring to how she almost solely raised her children whilst her husband was away on union or political matters. Thorn recalled a story where a girl accidentally cut off two of her fingers only for Semple to sew them back on with thread for a full recovery.

=== Political career ===
Semple served as president of the Wellington women's branch of the Labour Party, and was a member of the party national executive from 1930 to 1943. Semple was elected as a Wellington City Councillor in 1938. She lost her seat in 1941, an election which saw all Labour councillors unseated. She was also a long serving member of the Hospital Board, sitting on it from 1933 until 1941. Historians have argued that her own political contributions between the 1910s and 1940s were considerable, though heavily overshadowed by her husband's, who himself seldom acknowledged her efforts in any depth.

Semple died in 1967 aged 91, Bob had died in 1955. She was survived by her four children, 8 grandchildren, 16 great-grandchildren and 4 great-great-grandchildren.
