= Robert Bradford Williams =

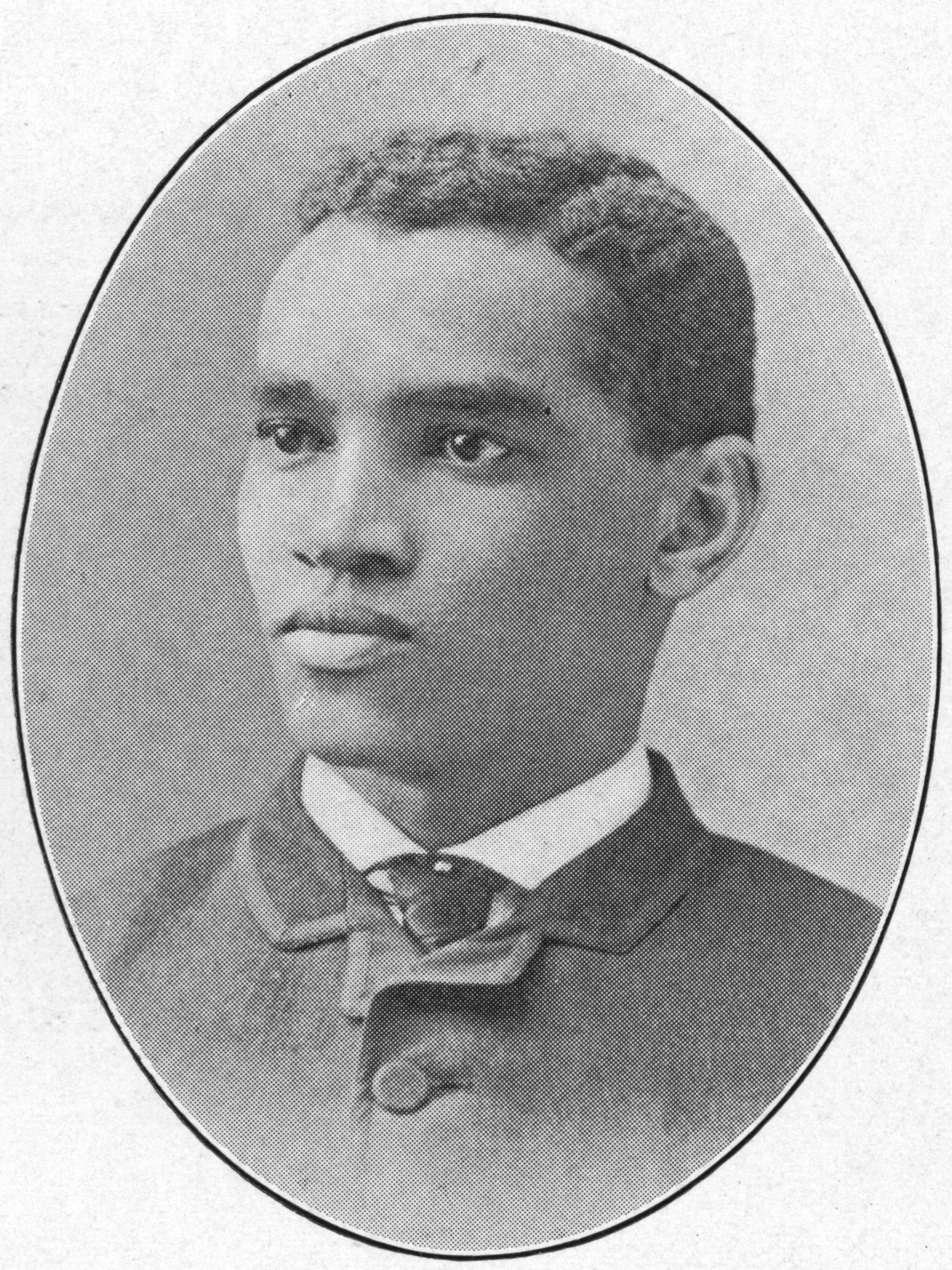
Robert Bradford Williams as a Yale College student

Robert Bradford Williams (24 June 1860—28 May 1942) was a New Zealand lawyer, musician, and politician. He was the mayor of the Borough of Onslow from 1902 to 1907, and was the first African-American mayor in New Zealand.

Williams was born in Augusta, Georgia. He was educated at the Williston Northampton School, and then at Yale University, graduating in 1885. After some time teaching and lecturing in the American south, he joined the Fisk Jubilee Singers for their 1886–87 world tour. He married Catherine Josephine Burke while on tour in Tasmania in 1886, and the couple moved to Wellington, New Zealand when the tour was complete.

Williams studied law in Wellington, and was admitted to the bar in 1889. He worked initially with Brown, Skerrett & Dean before establishing his own practice, and then forming a partnership with Vincent Meredith. He was elected mayor of Onslow in 1902, and was re-elected unopposed the following year. He continued to serve as mayor until he stepped down in 1907. He ran unsuccessfully as an independent for the seat of Wellington Suburbs at the 1908 New Zealand general election, and again for Wellington South at the 1914 election.

He died in Ōtaki in 1942.
