= Charles Chapman (New Zealand politician) =

New Zealand unionist and politician

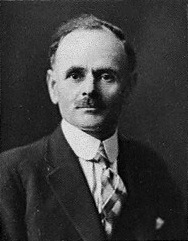

Member of the New Zealand Parliament for Wellington Central
- In office 27 November 1946 – 13 November 1954
- Preceded by: Peter Fraser
- Succeeded by: Frank Kitts

Member of the New Zealand Parliament for Wellington North
- In office 14 November 1928 – 27 November 1946
- Preceded by: John Luke
- Succeeded by: seat abolished

Personal details
- Born: Charles Henry Chapman; 1876 London, England
- Died: 2 March 1957 (aged 80–81) Wellington, New Zealand
- Party: Labour (1916–57); Social Democratic (1913–16)
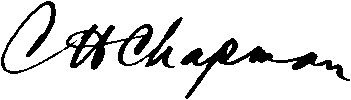
- Signature

Charles Henry Chapman (1876 – 2 March 1957) was a New Zealand unionist and politician of the Labour Party and various predecessor parties.

== Early life ==
Chapman was born in London, England, in 1876. At the age of 17 he joined the Independent Labour Party (ILP) and was later secretary of the London ILP Federation. Chapman was a linotype operator by trade as well as a union secretary. Upon leaving England he was made a life member of the ILP. He emigrated to New Zealand in 1905.

He settled in Wellington and became secretary of both the Wellington Typographical Union and Wellington Journalists Union. Chapman was also secretary of the Wellington Female Printers Assistants Union and the Wellington Related Printing Trades Union and was a proponent of related unions merging together for unity.

During World War I he was an advocator for dependents of servicemen and their rehabilitation. He became a member of the National Reparation Board. He was keenly interested in the work of the Red Cross Movement and was President of the New Zealand Red Cross for 25 years. He was also a worker for the Wellington Free Ambulance as a representative of the Red Cross. He was also a member of the Wellington Technical Board of Governors.

He was defeated in early 1928 for his position as secretary of the Wellington Typographical Union by James Henrichs. However he remained secretary of the Wellington Female Printers Assistants Union and the Wellington Related Printing Trades Union, but over time he became less enthusiastic about merging unions. In 1937 he was part of the printing unions' successful negotiating team for a legislated 40-hour work week.

== Political career ==
He was on the executive of the Independent Political Labour League (IPLL) in 1906/07. He was on the Advisory Committee of the Social Democratic Party in 1915–1916.

New Zealand Parliament
Years	Term	Electorate	Party
1928–1931	23rd	Wellington North	Labour
1931–1935	24th	Wellington North	Labour
1935–1938	25th	Wellington North	Labour
1938–1943	26th	Wellington North	Labour
1943–1946	27th	Wellington North	Labour
1946–1949	28th	Wellington Central	Labour
1949–1951	29th	Wellington Central	Labour
1951–1954	30th	Wellington Central	Labour

=== Local body politics ===
He was a Wellington City Councillor from 1919–1925 and 1929–1941, and also served on the Wellington Hospital Board. Chapman served three separate terms on the Wellington Harbour Board from 1919–21, 1925–31 and 1933–41.

In 1915, Chapman ran for Mayor of Wellington as the Social Democratic candidate. In a three horse race, he came a distant third. He ran for mayor a further three times as the Labour Party's nominee. He ran in 1925, 1927 and 1938 placing second on each occasion. At the 1944 election he was nominated to be Labour's candidate for the mayoralty, one of five candidates he was not selected with Labour Party president James Roberts prevailing.

=== Member of Parliament ===
He contested the Wellington South electorate in the 1908 election and came third behind Robert Wright and William Henry Peter Barber.

He contested the Hawke's Bay electorate in the 1919 election for the Labour Party and came third behind Hugh Campbell and Gilbert McKay. In 1922, he stood in the Hawke's Bay electorate again and came a distant third (and last) after Gilbert McKay and Andrew Hamilton Russell. In the 1925 election, he stood in the Wellington Suburbs electorate and was beaten by the incumbent, Robert Wright, who had also beaten him in 1908.

In 1928, Chapman was elected as the Member of Parliament for Wellington North which he held until the seats abolition in 1946. He then became the Member for Wellington Central from 1946 until 1954 when he retired.

In 1945 he was appointed a member of the Wellington Rehabilitation Committee.

== Later life ==
In 1935, he was awarded the King George V Silver Jubilee Medal, and in 1953 he received the Queen Elizabeth II Coronation Medal.

Chapman died in Wellington in 1957, aged 80, survived by a step-son and step-daughter. He was buried at Karori Cemetery in Wellington.

== Notes ==
New Zealand Parliament
Preceded by Peter Fraser	Member of Parliament for Wellington Central; 1946–1954	Succeeded by Frank Kitts
Preceded by John Luke	Member of Parliament for Wellington North; 1928–1946	Succeeded by Seat abolished
