= Ken Baxter (trade unionist) =

New Zealand printer and trade unionist (1893–1975)

Kenneth McLean Baxter (30 July 1893 – 13 June 1975) was a New Zealand printer and trade unionist. He was born in Naseby, in the Maniototo, New Zealand, on 30 July 1893.

In 1938 he unsuccessfully stood for the Wellington City Council on a Labour Party ticket. In 1953, he was awarded the Queen Elizabeth II Coronation Medal.
