= Peter Butler (trade unionist) =

Peter Butler CBE
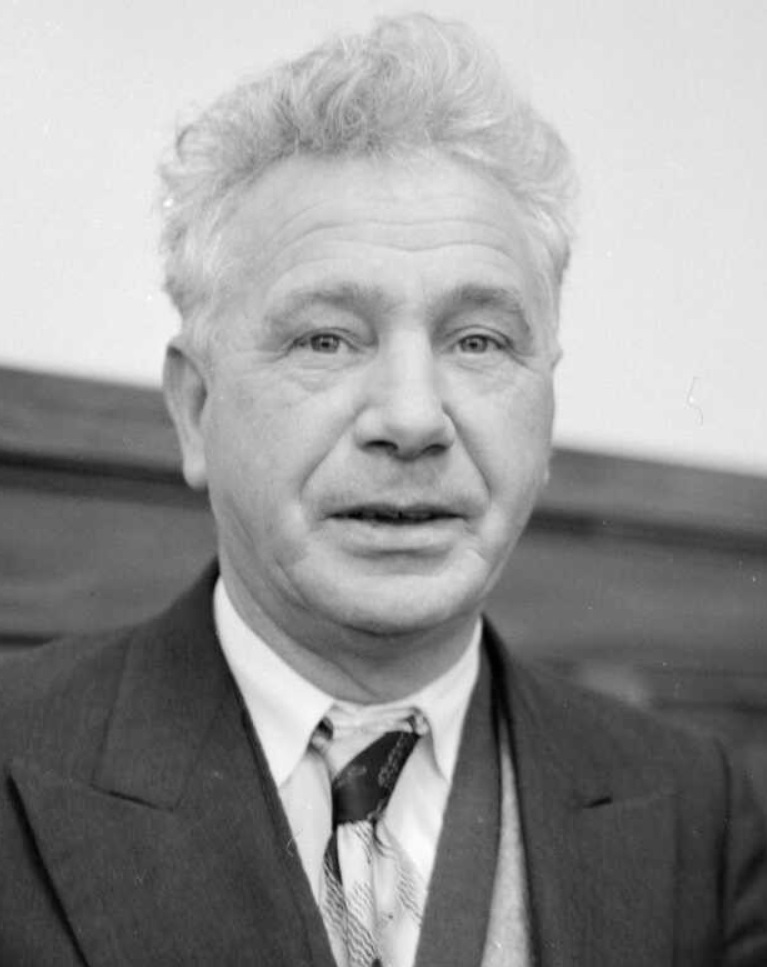
- Butler in 1957

Member of the Wellington City Council
- In office 4 May 1933 – 17 May 1941
- Constituency: At-large

Personal details
- Born: 31 May 1901 Whiteabbey, County Antrim, Ireland
- Died: 24 September 1995 (aged 94) Wellington, New Zealand
- Party: Labour
- Spouse: Doris Cooper
- Profession: Trade unionist

Peter Michael Butler CBE (31 May 1901 – 24 September 1995) was a New Zealand seaman, trade unionist, communist and local politician.

== Biography ==
=== Early life ===
He was born in Whiteabbey, County Antrim, Ireland, on 31 May 1901. Butler was largely self-educated, yet proved an effective speaker, writer and organiser later in life. At age 16 Butler joined the Mercantile Marine reserve, serving mostly in the North Sea for the remainder of World War I. After the war Butler became one of the leaders of a militant faction in the seamen's union and briefly courted communist ideology, which he rejected strongly later in life.

During the late 1920s and early 1930s (the duration of the Great Depression), Butler served as secretary of the Wellington Builders' and General Labourers' Union. On 18 December 1930, Peter Butler married Doris Annie Sevina Cooper at St Paul's Cathedral Church in Wellington (an Anglican church despite Butler being a committed Catholic). Later, he and Doris reaffirmed their marriage vows at a Catholic church in Johnsonville on 28 April 1938.

=== Political career ===
In 1928, he was an organiser for Bob Semple in his successful election campaign in Wellington East for the Labour Party. In the 1931 election, he unsuccessfully stood for the Labour Party in the Masterton electorate against the incumbent, George Sykes of the Reform Party. In the next election in 1935, he was defeated by Robert Wright in the Wellington Suburbs electorate. Butler had better success in local government. He was elected to the Wellington City Council at the 1933 election, only after special votes were counted, and was to remain a councillor until 1941. At the 1944 election he was nominated to be Labour's candidate for the mayoralty, one of five candidates he was not selected with Labour Party president James Roberts prevailing.

In 1953, Butler was awarded the Queen Elizabeth II Coronation Medal. He attempted to make political comeback in the 1960s, standing several times for the council on the Labour ticket in 1965, 1968 and a 1969 by-election. While polling strongly on all occasions he never managed to regain a seat.

=== Later life ===
Butler retired from his union positions in 1972. In the 1985 Queen's Birthday Honours, Butler was appointed a Commander of the Order of the British Empire, for services to the trade union movement. He died on 24 September 1995 and was buried at Whenua Tapu Cemetery near Pukerua Bay.
