= Clyde Carr =

New Zealand politician (1886–1962)

The Reverend Clyde Leonard Carr
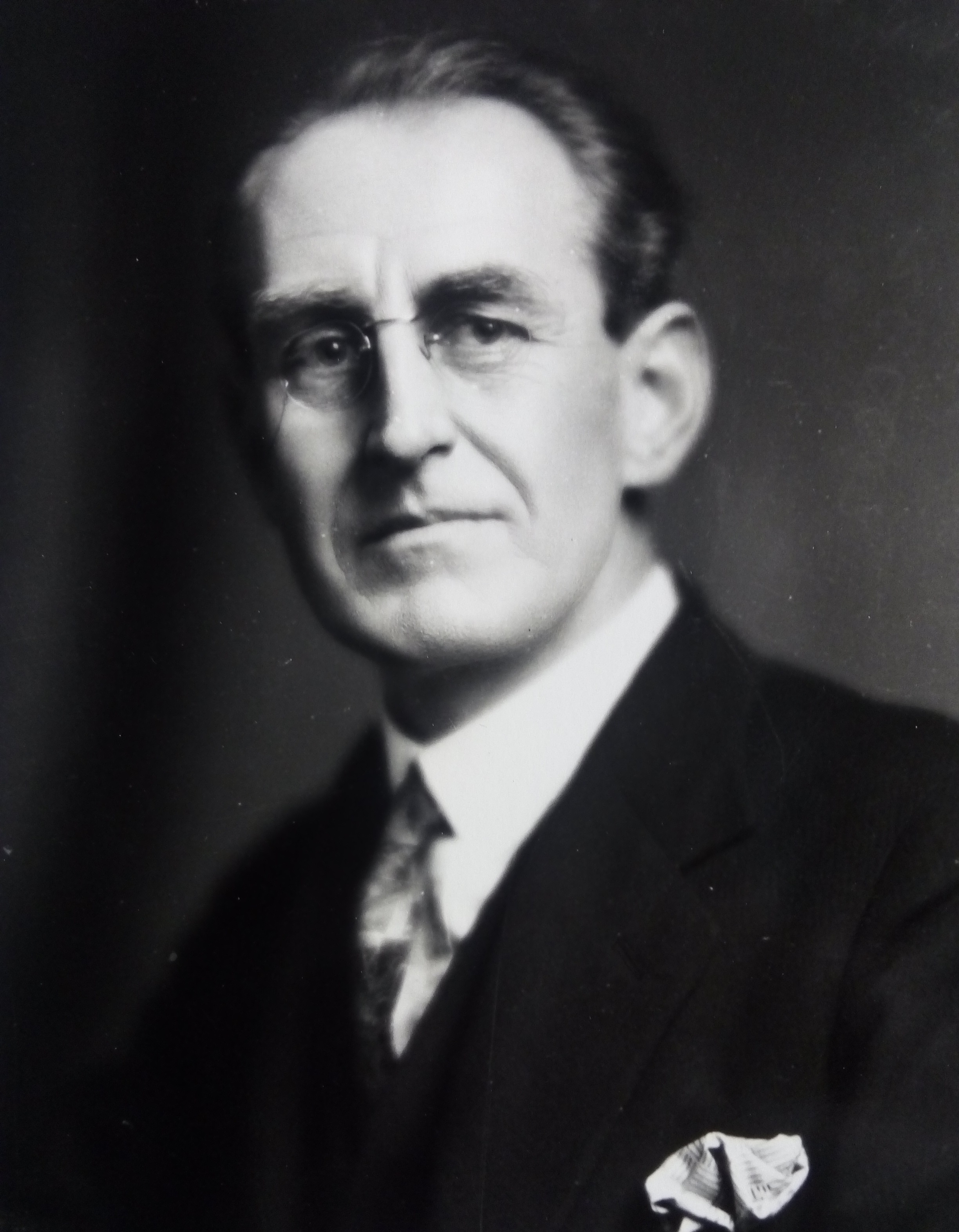

15th President of the Labour Party
- In office 14 April 1936 – 30 March 1937
- Vice President: Jim Thorn
- Preceded by: Walter Nash
- Succeeded by: James Roberts

Member of the New Zealand Parliament for Timaru
- In office 14 November 1928 – 21 July 1962
- Preceded by: Frank Rolleston
- Succeeded by: Basil Arthur

Personal details
- Born: 14 January 1886 Auckland, New Zealand
- Died: 18 September 1962 (aged 76) Christchurch, New Zealand
- Party: Labour Party
- Spouse: Laurel Carr
- Parent: Rev. Thomas Goodwill Carr

Clyde Leonard Carr (14 January 1886 – 18 September 1962) was a New Zealand politician of the Labour Party, and was a minister of the Congregational Church.

== Biography ==
=== Early life and career ===
Carr was born in Ponsonby, Auckland in 1886. His father was the Rev. Thomas Goodwill Carr (died 1935). Carr was educated at Nelson College from 1899 to 1902. Ordained as a minister in 1915, he was on the Christchurch City Council between 1923 and 1927 and the Hospital Board in the 1920s, after working in commerce and banking. Carr was also committed to animal welfare and in April 1936 he was elected to the office of President of the federated Societies for the Prevention of Cruelty to Animals.

=== Political career ===
New Zealand Parliament
Years	Term	Electorate	Party
1928–1931	23rd	Timaru	Labour
1931–1935	24th	Timaru	Labour
1935–1938	25th	Timaru	Labour
1938–1943	26th	Timaru	Labour
1943–1946	27th	Timaru	Labour
1946–1949	28th	Timaru	Labour
1949–1951	29th	Timaru	Labour
1951–1954	30th	Timaru	Labour
1954–1957	31st	Timaru	Labour
1957–1960	32nd	Timaru	Labour
1960–1962	33rd	Timaru	Labour

Carr joined the Labour Party in the early 1920s. He unsuccessfully sought the Labour nomination in the 1925 election in the Kaiapoi, Riccarton, and Ellesmere electorates. He moved to Timaru to contest the 1928 election in the Timaru electorate; he had no prior family or other connection to this provincial town. His 1928 election win was an unexpected upset, ousting the popular local lawyer Frank Rolleston, who was Attorney-General, Minister of Justice, and Minister of Defence at the time. Rolleston was the son of William Rolleston, one of the most influential politicians of the 19th century in Canterbury.

Carr represented the Timaru electorate from 1928 to 1962, when he resigned. His long representation of the electorate is unique in that a provincial town was not a safe Labour seat, and he had no prior relation with the people of Timaru before moving there to contest the 1928 election.

He was a dissident, getting three votes when he ran against Peter Fraser for Labour's leadership in 1940 to replace Savage as party leader.

He was not appointed to any ministerial positions, but was Chairman of Committees (1947–1949) and Deputy Speaker (1946–1950). He was Vice-President of the Labour Party (1933–1934) and President (1936–1937). Carr was widely read, and could assist the whips if the party was caught "on the hop" by speaking for his full-time while the party reorganised. He had a struggle to exist on his Parliamentary salary (£7 or $14 a week when he entered the house in 1928) and also contribute to local raffles and fundraisers. To save money he lived in his office, sleeping on a day-bed, although party leader Walter Nash tried to ban this for a time.

During the Nash-led Second Labour Government from 1957 to 1960, Carr was the chairman of the education select committee.

=== Death ===
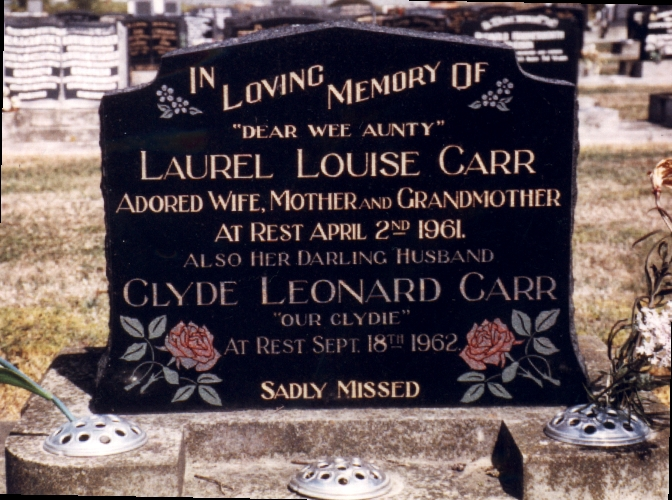
Grave of Carr and his wife Laurie

His wife died in April 1961 and he moved back to Christchurch soon after. He resigned from Parliament on 31 May 1962, and died on 18 September 1962.

== Honours ==
Carr was born in Ponsonby, Auckland in 1886. His father was the Rev. Thomas Goodwill Carr (died 1935). Carr was educated at Nelson College from 1899 to 1902. Ordained as a minister in 1915, he was on the Christchurch City Council between 1923 and 1927 and the Hospital Board in the 1920s, after working in commerce and banking. Carr was also committed to animal welfare and in April 1936 he was elected to the office of President of the federated Societies for the Prevention of Cruelty to Animals.

== Books by Carr ==
- Carr, Clyde (1926), The Everest of the spirit, Christchurch, [N.Z.]: Christchurch Press, Printers
- Carr, Clyde (1936), Politicalities, Wellington, [N.Z.]: National Magazines
- Carr, Clyde (1936), Politicalities (rev. ed.), Wellington, [N.Z.]: National Magazines
  - The two books above contain sketches of parliamentarians: many published in the "New Zealand radio record."
- Carr, Clyde (1944), Poems, Wellington, [N.Z.]: Progressive Publishing Society
- Carr, Clyde (chair) (1958), National library committee, Wellington, [N.Z.]: R.E. Owen, Government Printer

Political offices
Preceded by Robert McKeen	Chairman of Committees of the House of Representatives; 1947–1949	Succeeded by Cyril Harker
New Zealand Parliament
Preceded by Frank Rolleston	Member of Parliament for Timaru; 1928–1962	Succeeded by Basil Arthur
Party political offices
Preceded by Walter Nash	President of the Labour Party; 1936–1937	Succeeded by James Roberts
