= Charles Norwood =

Mayor of Wellington, New Zealand (1871–1966)

Sir Charles Norwood
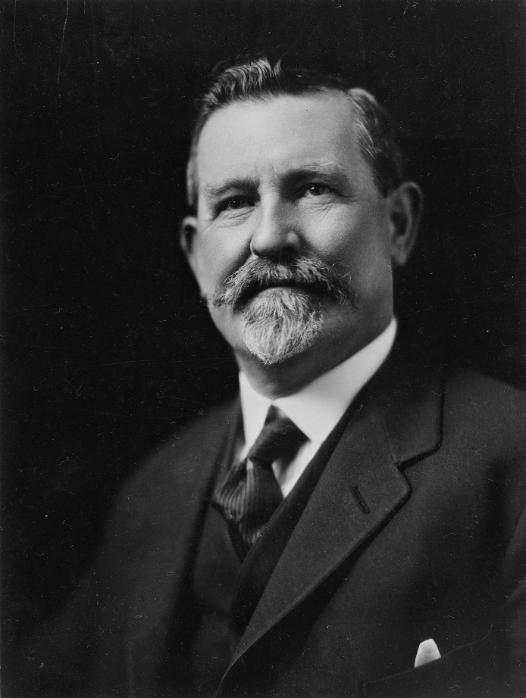

22nd Mayor of Wellington
- In office 1925–1927
- Preceded by: Robert Wright
- Succeeded by: George Troup

31st Chair of Wellington Harbour Board
- In office 1931–1933
- Preceded by: John William McEwan
- Succeeded by: Charles Murray Turrell

Personal details
- Born: 23 August 1871 Gympie, Queensland, Australia
- Died: 26 November 1966 (aged 95) Wellington, New Zealand
- Spouse: Rosina Ann Tattle (m. 1903; died 1957)
- Children: Three

Sir Charles John Boyd Norwood (23 August 1871 – 26 November 1966) was a prominent Wellington New Zealand–based businessman with interests throughout New Zealand and Australia. He was a civic leader, his knighthood was awarded for public services. Founder chairman (1927–1966) of the Wellington Free Ambulance he served on the Wellington City Council from 1917 to 1923 and he was for one term, 1925 to 1927, twenty-second Mayor of Wellington. He was a member of the Wellington Harbour Board for more than 30 years from 1918 to 1935 and from 1938 to 1953 and its chairman from 1931 to 1933.

== Biography ==
Norwood was born in Gympie, Queensland, Australia, in 1871, the son of Marion Norwood and John Boyd Norwood. He served an apprenticeship as a mechanical engineer and, after working in the mining and sugar industries, migrated to New Zealand in 1897. He married Rosina Ann Tattle in Wellington on 22 October 1903, and the couple went on to have three children.

He modelled the Wellington Free Ambulance on similar services in Australia funded by Golden Casket lotteries in Brisbane, and Maryborough and also in Newcastle, New South Wales. He had seen the efficient operation of the Brisbane service, and when he saw from his mayoral car in Wellington an accident on Lambton Quay he got out and put his coat on the victim. The hospital would not send their ambulance so as a member of the Wellington Harbour Board he asked them to send their ambulance to move the patient. He then resolved to start a free ambulance service in Wellington, which continues to dispatch ambulances to this day.

Norwood was regarded as a public-spirited man of great service to his community. His substantial business, Dominion Motors, imported assembled and distributed cars. He beat his competition to winning the Dominion's sole agency for the best selling English cars Morris by using his influence to go out with the Harbour Board's pilot boat to the ship on which W R Morris later Lord Nuffield was arriving in Wellington. The matter was settled before the ship tied up

He was a prominent member of the Wellington Rotary Club.

He was instrumental in helping Rotary set up the New Zealand Crippled Children Society (NZCCS) in 1935 and was the inaugural vice-president of that organisation. He was able to convince Lord Nuffield, on his 1935 visit to New Zealand, to donate 50,000 pounds to the newly established NZCCS. This donation was important to establishing the NZCCS and helping it expand nationwide. In 1939 he became the President of NZCCS and remained in that position until 1965, stepping down at the age of 94 (NZCCS rebranded to CCS Disability Action in 2008). In 1950 he donated funds to set up the CJB Norwood Trust, originally to help young adults with cerebral palsy gain work skills. The Trust is still in operation today but has broadened its scope and accepts applications from anyone in New Zealand who has cerebral palsy.

In 1966 he had been in indifferent health for some while, but was still chairman of the Wellington Free Ambulance when he died, aged 95. His trademarks were a cigar and his goatee beard. His wife Rosina was president of the Ladies’ Auxiliary from 1929 to 1955, and she was succeeded in that role by their daughter Eileen George. Rosina, Lady Norwood, died in 1957.

In 1935, Norwood was awarded the King George V Silver Jubilee Medal and he was appointed a Knight Bachelor in the 1937 Coronation Honours, for public services. In 1953, he was awarded the Queen Elizabeth II Coronation Medal.

== Career ==
C B Norwood had settled in Wellington by the turn of the century and was a senior manager of The Wellington Gas Company. Supplier of the only modern source of energy for heating lighting cooking the Gas Company was highly entrepreneurial and he was active outside his regular post in civic industrial and sporting affairs. In 1908 when he was a director of Wellington's Rouse & Hurrell Charles Norwood secured them the New Zealand Ford agency from Ford of Canada. In 1912 Rouse & Hurrell changed their name to Colonial Motor Company. Norwood began in the motor business the same year incorporating a company in 1913, Dominion Motor Vehicles Limited. He acquired premises in Courtenay Place through to Tory Street, the new buildings incorporated a ladies waiting room. Courtenay Place remained his business's base for another 80 years. He had agencies for Maxwell (later Chrysler) and Chevrolet together with the Hudson and Essex franchises. Dominion Motors went on to obtain the Morris agency and become New Zealand's sole assembler of Morris vehicles. The New Zealand representative of Rolls-Royce his always new Rolls-Royces were a familiar sight about Wellington. He surrendered his drivers licence on his 95th birthday. Soon after Sir Charles died Dominion Motors amalgamated with other assembly businesses to form New Zealand Motor Corporation.

Political offices
Preceded by Robert Wright	Mayor of Wellington; 1925–1927	Succeeded by George Troup
Preceded by John William McEwan	Chair of Wellington Harbour Board; 1931–1933	Succeeded by Charles Murray Turrell
