= Malcolm Fraser (statistician) =

New Zealand public servant and politician (1872–1949)

Malcolm Fraser CVO OBE (1872 – 29 November 1949) was a New Zealand public servant and local politician.

== Biography ==
Fraser was born in Inverness in 1872 and emigrated in 1893 to New Zealand. After arriving he joined the public service working as a clerk with the Land and Income Tax Department. In 1908, he began a new role as an accountant at the Public Service Superannuation Board. In 1911 he was appointed to the position of government statistician, heading the Department of Statistics with the task of organising and collating the statistics of the quinquennially conducted census.

During World War I, Fraser was directly responsible for devising and administering the conscription system in New Zealand including the national registration and conscription ballot as well as registering enemy aliens. The work was complex and by law much (such as ballots) had to be conducted by him personally. The department was also proliferated with letters from the public exposing supposed draft-dodgers, though the claims were difficult to prove. The department also grew drastically in size during his tenure, owing to war efforts, from employing 14 staff in August 1916 it ballooned to 162 by early 1918 (though had shrunk to 8 by February 1919, after the war). In June 1918, Fraser drew his own card in the conscription ballot. The story was made much of in the press, though journalists were quick to point out that at 45, he was only technically eligible for military service. Men aged up to 46 could enlist, but medical inspection boards rejected all men over 44 for active service abroad. For his services during the war as government statistician he was appointed an Officer of the Order of the British Empire in the 1919 Birthday Honours.

In 1930, he was appointed as Commissioner of Unemployment where he managed the government response to the Great Depression before he left the government statistician role in 1932. He was then under-secretary of Internal Affairs from 1932 until 1934 when he retired from the public service. For his services in internal affairs he was appointed a Commander of the Royal Victorian Order in the 1935 New Zealand Royal Visit Honours. He then served as chairman and director of the Equitable Building and Investment Company.

At the 1938 local elections, Fraser was elected to the Wellington City Council on the Citizens Association ticket. He was re-elected for two further terms until 1947 when he did not seek re-election. He was also a member of the Wellington Harbour Board from 1941 to 1944.

Fraser died in Wellington in 1949 at the age of 76.

== Notes ==
Government offices
Preceded by William M. Wright	Government Statistician; 1911–1932	Succeeded by Jim Butcher
