= George Mitchell (New Zealand politician) =

New Zealand politician

George Mitchell DSO
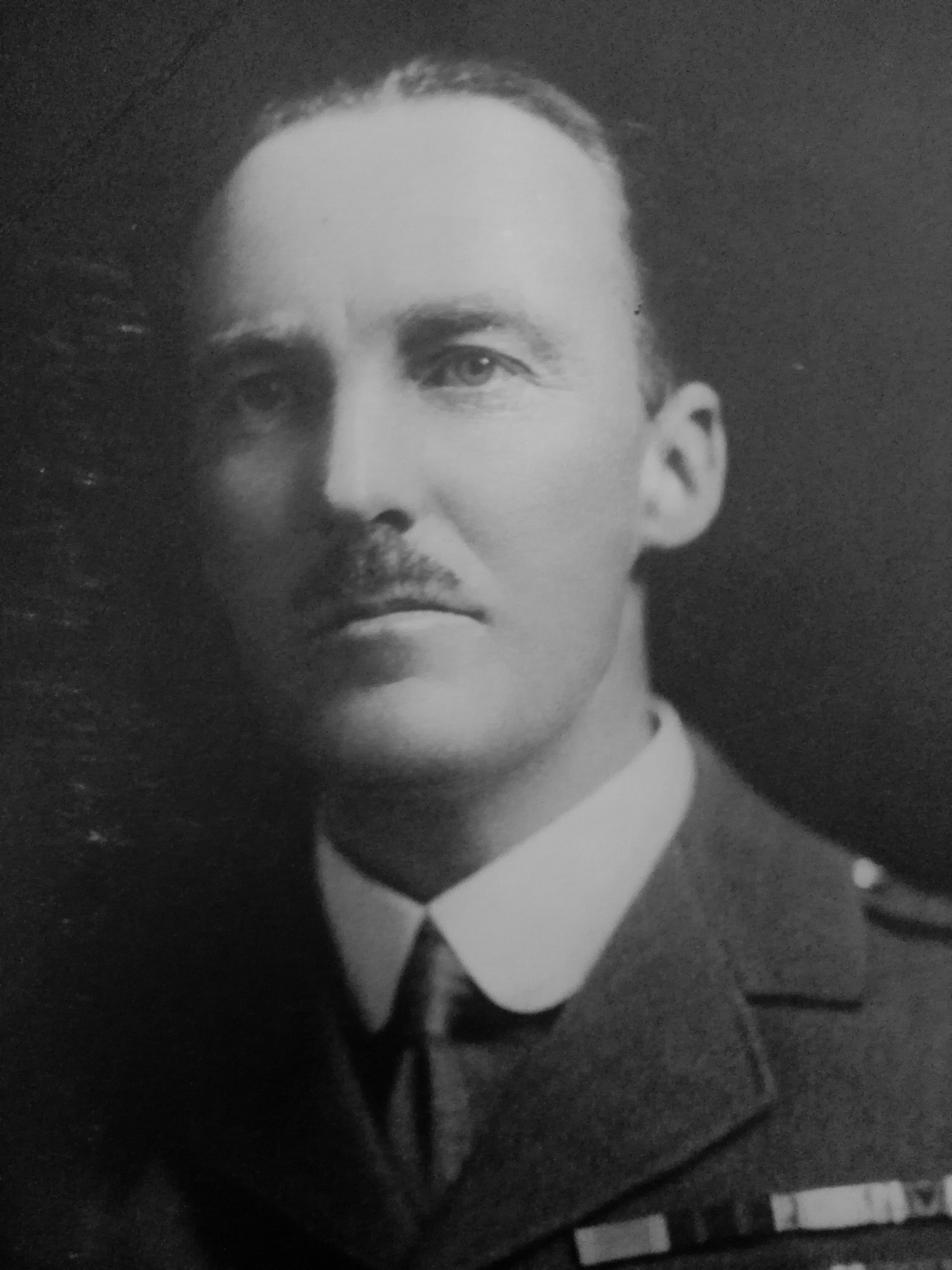

Member of the New Zealand Parliament for Wellington South
- In office 17 December 1919 – 7 December 1922
- Preceded by: Bob Semple
- Succeeded by: Robert McKeen

Personal details
- Born: 19 April 1877 Balclutha, New Zealand
- Died: 16 March 1939 (aged 61) Wellington, New Zealand
- Resting place: Karori Cemetery
- Party: Independent Liberal

Military service
- Allegiance: New Zealand Army
- Years of service: 1899–1902, 1914-18
- Rank: Lieutenant Colonel
- Battles/wars: Second Boer War; First World War
- Awards: Distinguished Service Order

Lieutenant Colonel George Mitchell DSO (10 April 1877 – 16 March 1939) was an Independent Liberal Member of Parliament for Wellington South in New Zealand. He also served with the New Zealand Military Forces in the Boer War and the First World War.

== Early life ==
George Mitchell was born in Balclutha on 10 April 1877. He was a member of the Balclutha Mounted Rifles in 1898.

== Military service ==
=== Boer War ===
Mitchell served with the 1st and 8th New Zealand Contingents in South Africa 1899–1902. Mitchell was awarded the Queen's South Africa Medal with relief of Kimberley, Paardeberg, Driefontein, Transvaal and South Africa 1902 Clasps.

=== First World War ===
Following the outbreak of the First World War, Mitchell volunteered for the 1st New Zealand Expeditionary Force for service aboard. He was a major in the Southland Regiment and commanding officer of the 3rd Otago Reserve Battalion from 1917 to 1919, reaching the rank of lieutenant colonel. Mitchell saw action in Gallipoli and France. He received the DSO in 1918 for distinguished service in the field (France and Flanders). He was awarded the Serbian Order of Karageorge, 4th Class with Swords; 1914-1915 Star; British War Medal; Victory Medal; Colonial Auxiliary Forces Long Service Medal; and NZ Volunteer Service Medal.

Mitchell was also the officer in charge of conscientious objector Archibald Baxter and responsible for punishing him with Field Punishment No.1.

== Political career ==
New Zealand Parliament
Years	Term	Electorate	Party
1919–1922	20th	Wellington South	Independent Liberal

Mitchell was the sensation of the 1919 election defeating the Labour MP, Bob Semple, who had won the Wellington South electorate in the previous year at a 1918 by-election. Mitchell served for one term until the 1922 election, when he was defeated by Labour's Robert McKeen.

After the end of his parliamentary career, Mitchell served on the Wellington City Council for two periods, from 1923 to 1925 and again from 1927 to 1931. He also served on the Wellington Harbour Board from 1921 to 1929 serving as its chair from 1923 to 1925.

== Later life ==
He was the President of the Returned Soldiers' Association (RSA), an executive member of the War Relief Association and sat on the Wellington College Board of Governors.

Mitchell died 16 March 1939 in Wellington in a private hospital, aged 62. He was survived by his second wife, and five children from his first marriage. He was buried at Karori Cemetery.

== Notes ==
Political offices
Preceded by Joseph Harkness	Chair of Wellington Harbour Board; 1923–1925	Succeeded by Maurice Cohen
New Zealand Parliament
Preceded by Bob Semple	Member of Parliament for Wellington South; 1919–1922	Succeeded by Robert McKeen
