= Robert McKeen =

New Zealand politician

The Honourable Robert McKeen CMG
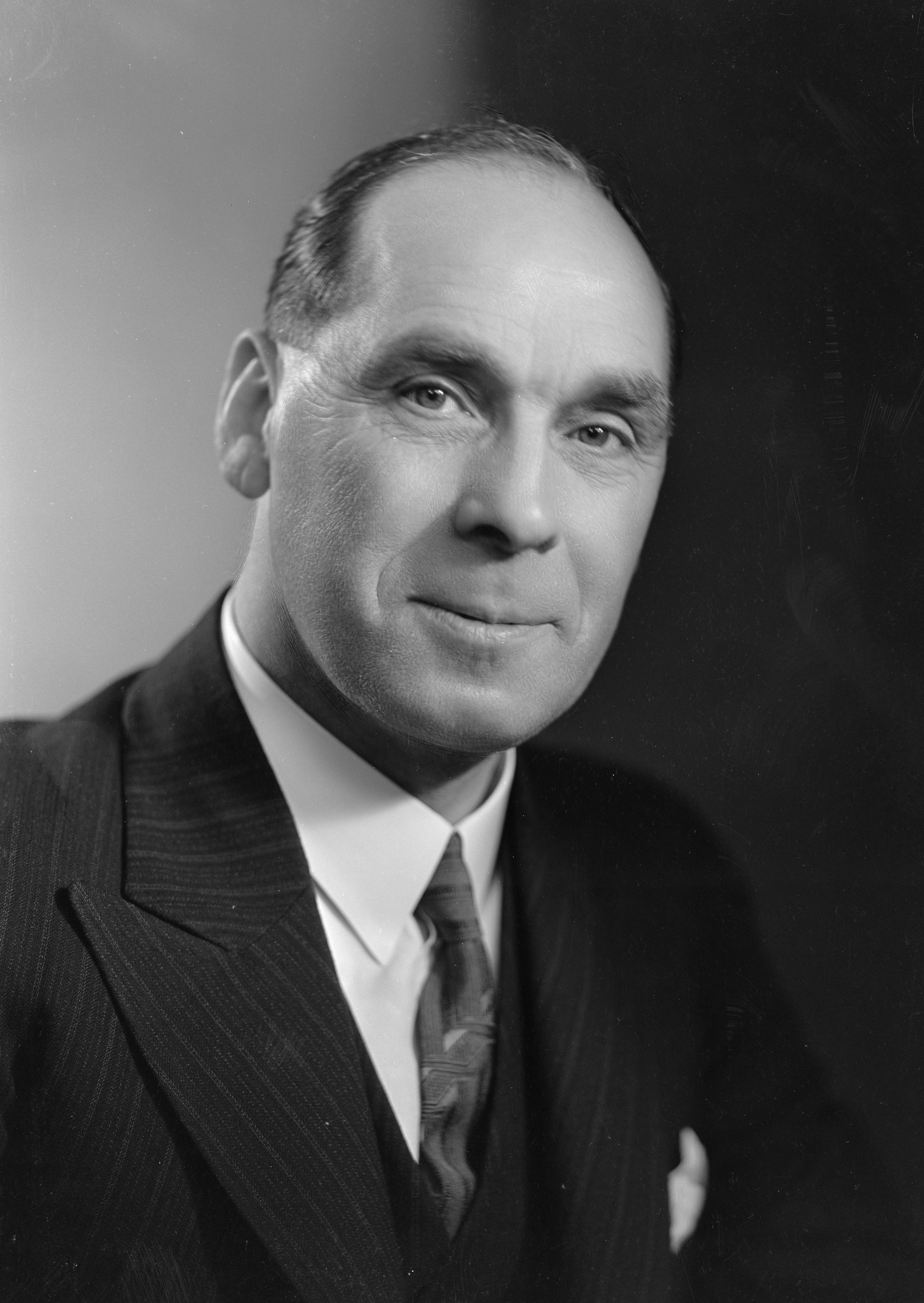
- Robert McKeen in the 1930s

12th Speaker of the House of Representatives
- In office 24 June 1947 – 3 November 1949
- Prime Minister: Peter Fraser
- Preceded by: Bill Schramm
- Succeeded by: Matthew Oram

Member of the New Zealand Parliament for Wellington South
- In office 7 December 1922 – 4 November 1946
- Preceded by: George Mitchell
- Succeeded by: Constituency abolished

Member of the New Zealand Parliament for Island Bay
- In office 27 November 1946 – 5 October 1954
- Preceded by: New constituency
- Succeeded by: Arnold Nordmeyer

Personal details
- Born: 12 July 1884 Edinburgh, Scotland
- Died: 5 August 1974 (aged 90) Ōtaki, New Zealand
- Party: Labour Party
- Spouse: Jessie Russell
- Profession: Grocer

Robert McKeen CMG (12 July 1884 – 5 August 1974) was a New Zealand politician of the Labour Party. He was Speaker of the House of Representatives.

== Early life ==
He was born in 1884 in Edinburgh and received his education in West Calder, West Lothian, Scotland. In Scotland, he was active in the labour movement, and worked as a grocer's assistant in a co-operative store. He emigrated to New Zealand in 1909, and worked in coal mines on the West Coast before moving to Wellington, and a grocery store. He was a union official.

== Political career ==
New Zealand Parliament
Years	Term	Electorate	Party
1922–1925	21st	Wellington South	Labour
1925–1928	22nd	Wellington South	Labour
1928–1931	23rd	Wellington South	Labour
1931–1935	24th	Wellington South	Labour
1935–1938	25th	Wellington South	Labour
1938–1943	26th	Wellington South	Labour
1943–1946	27th	Wellington South	Labour
1946–1949	28th	Island Bay	Labour
1949–1951	29th	Island Bay	Labour
1951–1954	30th	Island Bay	Labour

In the 1919 election, McKeen organised the campaign of the Labour Party in Wellington. He first stood for the House of Representatives in the 1922 election and was successful. He was the Member of Parliament for Wellington South from 1922 to 1946, then Island Bay from 1946 to 1954, when he retired. McKeen was Labour's junior whip in 1935 and 1936, and its senior whip in 1937 and 1938. He was Chairman of Committees from 1939 to 1946. Subsequent to that, he was the twelfth Speaker of the House of Representatives, from 1947 to 1950.

He was on the Wellington City Council for 18 years, and the Wellington Harbour Board for nine years. Bob Semple and McKeen were the only Labour city councillors during 1927–1929, and they were also parliamentary colleagues. They were close friends, and retired from parliament at the same time. McKeen stood for the Wellington mayoralty and the Council in 1941, but was defeated by the incumbent Thomas Hislop in a swing against Labour. He also lost his seat on the council, although he was the highest polling candidate not elected, and in 1938 he had been the second highest-polling candidate elected. He was later appointed to fill the vacancy on the council in 1942 caused by Len McKenzie's death. At the 1944 local elections he was nominated to be Labour's candidate for the mayoralty once again, one of five nominees he declined to stand for selection with Labour Party president James Roberts prevailing.

He was mayor of Otaki for six years in the 1950s.

In 1935, McKeen was awarded the King George V Silver Jubilee Medal, and in 1953 he was awarded the Queen Elizabeth II Coronation Medal. He was appointed a Companion of the Order of St Michael and St George in the 1960 Queen's Birthday Honours, for services in public affairs as a trade unionist, Member of Parliament and Speaker of the House of Representatives.

== Family and death ==
He married Jessie Russell, the daughter of Robert Russell. He died in Ōtaki on 5 August 1974, and was buried at the Kelvin Grove Cemetery in Palmerston North.

== Notes ==
Political offices
Preceded by Ted Howard	Chairman of Committees of the House of Representatives; 1939–1946	Succeeded by Clyde Carr
Preceded by Bill Schramm	Speaker of the New Zealand House of Representatives; 1947–1950	Succeeded by Matthew Oram
New Zealand Parliament
Preceded by George Mitchell	Member of Parliament for Wellington South; 1922–1946	Constituency abolished
New constituency	Member of Parliament for Island Bay; 1946–1954	Succeeded by Arnold Nordmeyer
Party political offices
Preceded by Bill Jordan	Senior Whip of the Labour Party; 1936–1939	Succeeded by James O'Brien
