= Wellington South (New Zealand electorate) =

Wellington South is a former New Zealand parliamentary electorate. It existed for two periods between 1881 and 1946. It was represented by seven Members of Parliament.

== Population centres ==
The previous electoral redistribution was undertaken in 1875 for the 1875–1876 election. In the six years since, New Zealand's European population had increased by 65%. In the 1881 electoral redistribution, the House of Representatives increased the number of European representatives to 91 (up from 84 since the 1875–76 election). The number of Māori electorates was held at four. The House further decided that electorates should not have more than one representative, which led to 35 new electorates being formed, including Wellington South, and two electorates that had previously been abolished to be recreated. This necessitated a major disruption to existing boundaries.

The electorate was in the southern suburbs of Wellington. It was east of the Foxton and Te Aro electorates, and included Miramar Peninsula. In the 1887 electoral redistribution, the electorate was abolished again and replaced Wellington East for the more densely populated area, and by Wellington South and Suburbs for the more rural parts.

== History ==
The first representative was William Hutchison, who was elected in 1881. In the 1884 election, Hutchison was defeated by George Fisher. When Wellington South was abolished in 1887, Fisher transferred to Wellington East.

It was then re-created in 1908 and abolished in 1946. It was largely replaced by the Island Bay electorate, to which Robert McKeen transferred.

=== Election results ===
Wellington South was represented by seven Members of Parliament.

Key

| Independent | Labour | Labour (1910) |
| United Labour | Independent Liberal | Labour |

| Election | Winner |
|---|---|
| 1881 election | William Hutchison |
| 1884 election | George Fisher |
(Electorate abolished 1887–1908)
| 1908 election | Robert Wright |
| 1911 election | Alfred Hindmarsh |
| 1914 election | Alfred Hindmarsh |
| 1918 by-election | Bob Semple |
| 1919 election | George Mitchell |
| 1922 election | Robert McKeen |
| 1925 election | Robert McKeen |
| 1928 election | Robert McKeen |
| 1931 election | Robert McKeen |
| 1935 election | Robert McKeen |
| 1938 election | Robert McKeen |
| 1943 election | Robert McKeen |
(Electorate abolished in 1946, see Island Bay)

== Election results ==
=== 1943 election ===
1943 general election: Wellington Suburbs
| Party | Candidate | Votes | % | ±% |
|---|---|---|---|---|
| Labour | Robert McKeen | 8,091 | 59.36 | |
| National | Ernest Toop | 3,935 | 28.87 | |
| Democratic Labour | Charlie Teece | 1,269 | 9.31 | |
| Independent | Terrence Maddison | 209 | 1.53 | |
| Majority | | 4,156 | 30.49 | |
| Turnout | | 13,630 | 88.74 | |
| Registered electors | | 15,359 | | |

=== 1935 election ===
1935 general election: Wellington South
| Party | Candidate | Votes | % | ±% |
|---|---|---|---|---|
| Labour | Robert McKeen | 8,170 | 67.35 | +5.79 |
| Reform | Henry Toogood | 2,111 | 17.40 | |
| Democrat | Joseph Isaac Goldsmith | 1,849 | 15.24 | |
| Informal votes | | 68 | 0.56 | +0.20 |
| Majority | | 6,059 | 49.95 | +26.83 |
| Turnout | | 12,130 | 87.17 | +5.86 |
| Registered electors | | 13,914 | | |

=== 1931 election ===
1931 general election: Wellington South
| Party | Candidate | Votes | % | ±% |
|---|---|---|---|---|
| Labour | Robert McKeen | 7,081 | 61.56 | +10.02 |
| United | Will Appleton | 4,422 | 38.44 | |
| Informal votes | | 42 | 0.36 | −0.76 |
| Majority | | 2,659 | 23.12 | −2.32 |
| Turnout | | 11,545 | 81.31 | −6.71 |
| Registered electors | | 14,198 | | |

=== 1928 election ===
1928 general election: Wellington South
| Party | Candidate | Votes | % | ±% |
|---|---|---|---|---|
| Labour | Robert McKeen | 5,984 | 51.54 | −4.77 |
| Reform | Martin Luckie | 3,031 | 26.11 | |
| United | John Burns | 2,595 | 22.35 | |
| Majority | | 2,953 | 25.43 | |
| Informal votes | | 132 | 1.12 | −0.32 |
| Turnout | | 11,742 | 88.03 | −3.08 |
| Registered electors | | 13,339 | | |

=== 1925 election ===
1925 general election: Wellington South
| Party | Candidate | Votes | % | ±% |
|---|---|---|---|---|
| Labour | Robert McKeen | 5,903 | 56.31 | +4.66 |
| Liberal | Archie Sievwright | 4,429 | 42.24 | |
| Informal votes | | 151 | 1.44 | +0.41 |
| Majority | | 1,474 | 14.06 | +9.72 |
| Turnout | | 10,483 | 91.11 | +0.95 |
| Registered electors | | 11,505 | | |

=== 1922 election ===
1922 general election: Wellington South
| Party | Candidate | Votes | % | ±% |
|---|---|---|---|---|
| Labour | Robert McKeen | 5,017 | 51.65 | |
| Independent Liberal | George Mitchell | 4,595 | 47.30 | −10.69 |
| Informal votes | | 101 | 1.03 | −0.21 |
| Majority | | 422 | 4.34 | |
| Turnout | | 9,713 | 90.16 | +8.37 |
| Registered electors | | 10,773 | | |

=== 1919 election ===
1919 general election: Wellington South
| Party | Candidate | Votes | % | ±% |
|---|---|---|---|---|
| Independent Liberal | George Mitchell | 4,801 | 57.99 | |
| Labour | Bob Semple | 3,375 | 40.76 | −17.87 |
| Informal votes | | 103 | 1.24 | +0.83 |
| Majority | | 1,426 | 17.22 | |
| Turnout | | 8,279 | 81.79 | +39.28 |
| Registered electors | | 10,122 | | |

=== 1918 by-election ===
1918 Wellington South by-election
| Party | Candidate | Votes | % | ±% |
|---|---|---|---|---|
| Labour | Bob Semple | 2,411 | 58.63 | |
| Reform | George Frost | 1,286 | 31.27 | |
| Independent | John Castle | 398 | 9.67 | |
| Informal votes | | 17 | 0.41 | −0.37 |
| Majority | | 1,125 | 27.35 | |
| Turnout | | 4,112 | 42.51 | −43.78 |
| Registered electors | | 9,673 | | |

=== 1914 election ===
1914 general election
| Party | Candidate | Votes | % | ±% |
|---|---|---|---|---|
| United Labour | Alfred Hindmarsh | 4,279 | 56.12 | +4.36 |
| Reform | John Luke | 3,064 | 40.18 | |
| Independent | Robert Bradford Williams | 221 | 2.89 | |
| Majority | | 1,215 | 15.93 | |
| Informal votes | | 60 | 0.78 | |
| Turnout | | 7,624 | 86.29 | |
| Registered electors | | 8,835 | | |

=== 1911 election ===
1911 general election: Second ballot
| Party | Candidate | Votes | % | ±% |
|---|---|---|---|---|
| Labour | Alfred Hindmarsh | 3,598 | 51.76 | +14.62 |
| Reform | Robert Wright | 3,344 | 48.10 | +6.73 |
| Majority | | 254 | 3.65 | |
| Informal votes | | 9 | 0.12 | −1.18 |
| Turnout | | 6,951 | 76.66 | −2.61 |

1911 general election: First ballot
| Party | Candidate | Votes | % | ±% |
|---|---|---|---|---|
| Reform | Robert Wright | 2,974 | 41.37 | |
| Labour | Alfred Hindmarsh | 2,670 | 37.14 | |
| Liberal | William Barber | 1,264 | 17.58 | |
| Independent | Albert Couzens | 185 | 2.57 | |
| Informal votes | | 95 | 1.32 | |
| Turnout | | 7,188 | 79.27 | |
| Registered electors | | 9,067 | | |
