= John Read (New Zealand politician) =

New Zealand politician and trade unionist

John Read JP
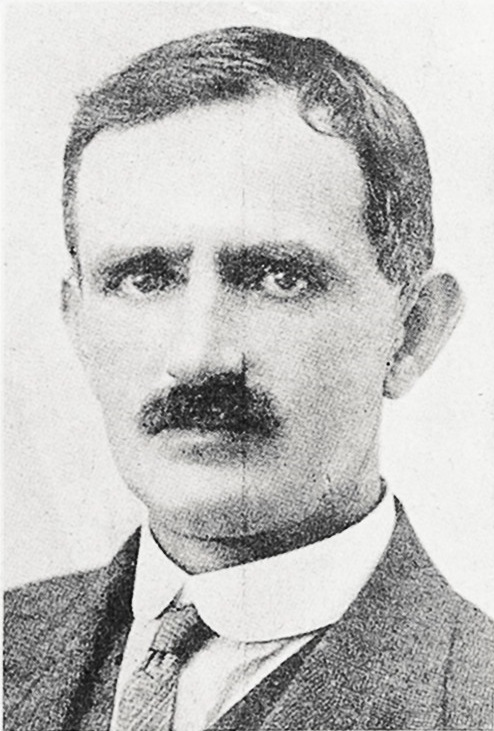

Wellington City Councillor
- In office 1936–1938
- Preceded by: William Bennett

Personal details
- Born: 1874 Clifton, England
- Died: 14 September 1942 (aged 67–68) Wellington, New Zealand
- Party: Social Democratic (1913–16); Labour (1916–42)
- Profession: Trade unionist

John Read JP (1874 – 14 September 1942) was a New Zealand politician and trade unionist.

== Biography ==
=== Early life ===
Born in Clifton, a coal mining town on the hinterlands of Manchester in 1874, Read started work in a mine himself at the age of 12. Read was a labour advocate and joined the Independent Labour Party in 1894.

Read and his wife sailed to New Zealand in 1901 settling in Wellington, where he found work as a trade unionist. He became secretary of the Wellington Engine Drivers' Union, later secretary of the Engine Drivers' Federation, and finally from 1917 until his retirement he was the secretary of the Wellington Timber Workers' Union. In 1923 he was made a Justice of the Peace at the request of the Trades Council.

=== Political career ===
Read was a member of the Advisory Committee of the Social Democratic Party from 1915 to 1916. He joined the Labour Party upon the SDP's merger into it. He was also the President of the Wellington Co-operative Society for three years. In 1918 he sought the Labour nomination for the Wellington Central by-election, but lost to Peter Fraser. Later that year, he was nominated by the Engine Drivers' Union for the Labour nomination in the Wellington South by-election, but was defeated by Bob Semple.

He stood as the Labour Party's candidate for Mayor of Wellington in the 1919 election, but was beaten by incumbent John Luke. Later that year Read also stood for the Wellington North electorate in the New Zealand House of Representatives in 1919 election for the Labour Party where he placed last out of three candidates in a tight race also won by Luke.

Following the death of Wellington City Councillor William Bennett of the Citizens' Association (who had been the Deputy Mayor), Read won the resulting by-election, beating former city councillor and MP Thomas Forsyth. Read remained a member of the city council until 1938. He had stood for election many times previously but had been unsuccessful.

=== Death ===
Read died in Wellington on 14 September 1942. He was survived by his wife, one daughter, and two grandchildren.
