= William Gaudin =

New Zealand merchant and local politician (1877–1969)

William Gaudin OBE
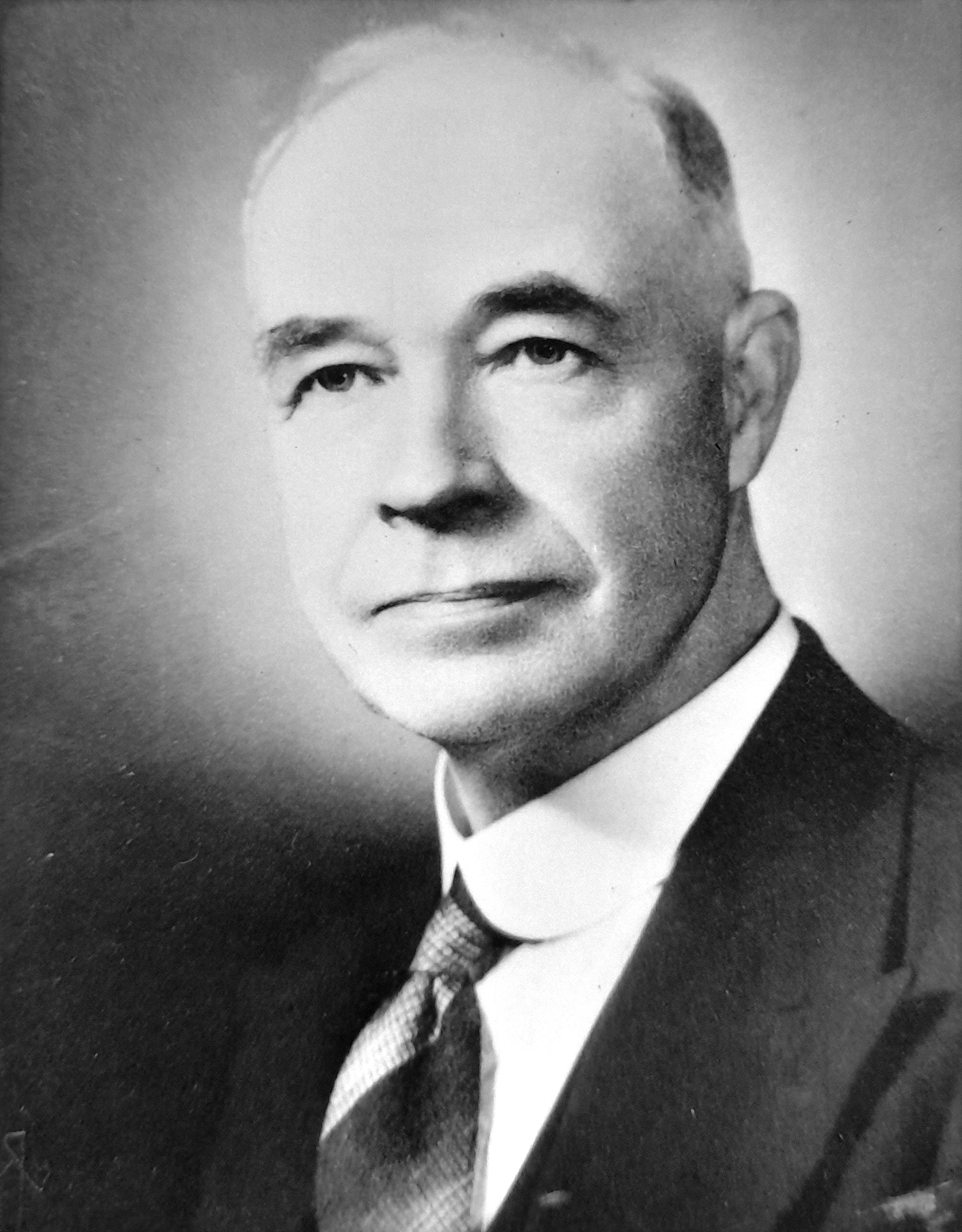

19th Chairman of the Wellington Hospital Board
- In office 11 December 1947 – 14 December 1950
- Preceded by: Henry Toogood
- Succeeded by: Mervyn Castle

Member of the Wellington Hospital Board
- In office 16 March 1939 – 18 November 1950
- Preceded by: Sarah Snow
- Constituency: Wellington City

Member of the Wellington City Council
- In office 3 May 1927 – 19 November 1947
- Constituency: At-large
- In office 17 September 1920 – 11 May 1925
- Preceded by: George Frost
- Constituency: At-large

Personal details
- Born: 17 April 1877 Wellington, New Zealand
- Died: 19 November 1969 (aged 92) Wellington, New Zealand
- Spouse: Olive Banks (m. 1902; died 1954)
- Children: 6
- Profession: Merchant

William James Gaudin OBE (17 April 1877 – 19 November 1969) was a New Zealand merchant and politician.

== Biography ==
=== Early life and career ===
Gaudin was born in Wellington in 1877, his parents having migrated to New Zealand from Jersey. He was educated at Te Aro School and Wellington College. He was a participant in multiple sports as a youth, particularly rugby and rowing. He was a captain of the Wellington Rowing Club and later was the club president for over fifty years. He entered business as a merchant, later opening his own firm of coal and grain merchants, W. J. Gaudin and Sons.

On 11 June 1902, Gaudin married Olive Banks at St Mark's Church, Wellington, and the couple went on to have four sons and two daughters. Gaudin Street in Rongotai was named after his father, William Gaudin senior.

=== Political career ===
At the 1919 local elections, Gaudin stood for the Wellington City Council on the Citizens League ticket, but was unsuccessful. At a 1920 by-election he was elected to the council, remaining a member until 1925 when he did not seek re-election. Despite retiring from the council, he contested another by-election in 1926, but was defeated by the Labour Party candidate John Glover. At the 1927 election he was elected for a second spell on the council. He remained a member until 1947 when he retired. He was chairman of the council's library committee and was also elected president of the New Zealand Library Association Inc. between 1936 and 1937. Ahead of the 1944 election he put himself forward for the mayoralty, one of two councillors challenging incumbent Thomas Hislop for the Citizens' nomination. He was beaten by Hislop, but the challenge eventually led him to reconsider and retire (albeit reluctantly).

Gaudin stood for parliament as an independent candidate at the 1935 election in the Wellington East electorate, but polled only 4.25% of the vote.

In 1939, Gaudin was appointed a member of the Wellington Hospital Board to fill a mid-term vacancy after the death of Sarah Snow. His appointment was controversial as Ruby Muriel Collins was expected to be awarded the vacated seat owing to being the highest polling unsuccessful candidate at the 1938 election. Despite Gaudin not having contested the previous election, he was appointed by the city council to fill the vacancy. Labour councillors opposed this and voted for Collins, arguing it was more fitting to replace a female Labour member with a female Labour candidate. The appointment was also crucial as it shifted the balance of power on the board, giving the Citizens' a majority of 10 seats to 8 (having previously been 9 seats each). He remained a member until 1950 when he retired. From 1947 to 1950, he was the board's chairman, defeating the incumbent Henry Toogood in a ballot by eleven votes to five at the first meeting of the term.

Gaudin was a member of the Wellington Harbour Board for one term from 1947 to 1950 for the Wellington City constituency.

=== Later life and death ===
In the 1958 New Year Honours, Gaudin was appointed an Officer of the Order of the British Empire, for services to local government in Wellington. In later life, Gaudin lived in Paekākāriki. In November 1958, he suffered shock and scalp injuries when he drove his car off the road and rolled down a bank between Pukerua Bay and Plimmerton. Two passengers were also injured and all three were admitted to Wellington Hospital.

Gaudin died on 19 November 1969 at Wellington Hospital. He was survived by three of his sons and two daughters. His wife and one son had predeceased him.

== Personal life ==
Gaudin was a religious man and was an active in the congregation of St Mark's Church in Wellington. He served in many offices for the church, including as synodsman from 1913 to 1953. He was a member of the St Mark's Church School committee from 1917 until 1965. He was also a Freemason and was a past master of the New Zealand Pacific No. 2, Wellington's oldest lodge.

== Notes ==
Political offices
Preceded by Henry Toogood	Chair of Wellington Hospital Board; 1947–1950	Succeeded by Mervyn Castle
