= James Roberts (trade unionist) =

New Zealand trade unionist and politician

James Roberts CMG
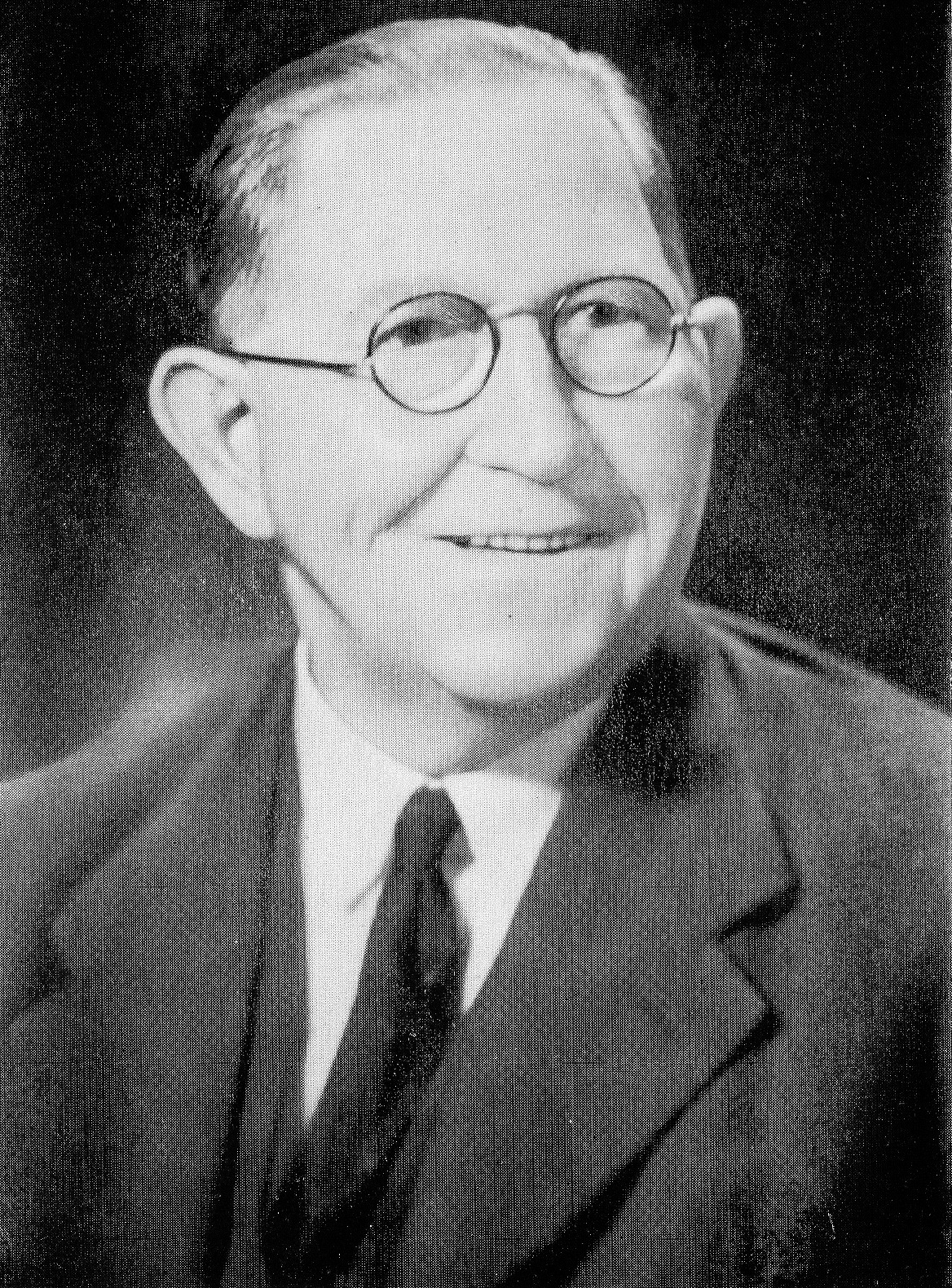

16th President of the Labour Party
- In office 30 March 1937 – 9 May 1950
- Vice President: Jim Thorn (1937–38); Jim Barclay (1938–40); Gervan McMillan (1940–42); Arnold Nordmeyer (1942–50)
- Leader: Michael Joseph Savage†; Peter Fraser
- Preceded by: Clyde Carr
- Succeeded by: Arnold Nordmeyer

Member of the New Zealand Legislative Council
- In office 17 June 1947 – 31 December 1950
- Appointed by: Peter Fraser

Personal details
- Born: 21 February 1878 Lissangle, County Cork, Ireland
- Died: 4 February 1967 (aged 88) Porirua, New Zealand
- Party: Labour
- Spouse: Lucy Wallace (m. 1912; died 1944)
- Children: 6
- Occupation: Trade unionist

James Roberts CMG (21 February 1878 – 4 February 1967) was a New Zealand trade unionist, politician and was president of the Labour Party from 1937 to 1950. He was called 'Big Jim' and 'the uncrowned King of New Zealand' in recognition of the considerable influence he wielded during the period of the First Labour Government over policy creation and implementation.

== Early life ==
Roberts was born in Lissangle, County Cork, Ireland, in 1878 and arrived in New Zealand in 1901 or 1902. His first years in New Zealand were spent struggling to find stable employment before eventually finding a job with the Wellington Gas Company. He married Lucy Wallace on 22 February 1912, with whom he had six children with. Lucy became deaf during her third pregnancy and later developed rheumatoid arthritis leaving her largely handicapped.

His job with the Wellington Gas Company saw him join the union and briefly became its president. As a result, he became active in the Wellington Socialist Party, which Roberts and Robert Hogg kept from joining the local United Labour Party under the "unity scheme" in 1912. He was then opposed to political activity and the Labour Party, and challenged the primacy of the Labour parliamentarians. He was secretary of the New Zealand Waterside Workers Federation from 1915 to 1941 and the Alliance of Labour from 1920 to 1935.

== Political career ==
Roberts became one of the dominant figures of the Labour Party, serving as vice-president from 1934 to 1936, and national president between 1937 and 1950. Roberts created a collaborative relationship between the Labour Party and trade unions during the tenure of the First Labour Government. Little of the industrial legislation passed by Labour went without his input and scrutiny. He occupied the chair during Labour's annual conferences and chaired the session at the 1940 conference which approved the expulsion of John A. Lee, whom Roberts was opposed to.

Roberts sought the nomination for the Wellington West electorate ahead of the 1938 general election, but was unsuccessful. In 1944 he stood for Mayor of Wellington, but was defeated by Will Appleton. The election saw all Labour candidates defeated as well. He was appointed to the Legislative Council from 17 June 1947 to 31 December 1950, being nominated by the Labour Government. Following the Legislative Council's abolition, he was elected a member of the Wellington City Council in 1950. He was re-elected in 1953 and 1956, but was defeated in 1959. He was elected to the Wellington Harbour Board in 1953. He served two terms before he was defeated in 1959.

Following the defeat of the Labour government at the 1949 general election, Roberts was defeated for the party presidency by his perennial opponent for the position Arnold Nordmeyer, ending a record 13 year presidency. Roberts was elected as vice-president, holding the office until 1954.

In 1953, Roberts was awarded the Queen Elizabeth II Coronation Medal.

== Later life and death ==
Roberts was appointed a Companion of the Order of St Michael and St George in the 1958 Queen's Birthday Honours, in recognition of his services as secretary of the New Zealand Waterside Workers' Federation and the Alliance of Labour.

Roberts died in Porirua in 1967, survived by four daughters and a son. His wife had died in 1944.

== Notes ==
Party political offices
Preceded by Clyde Carr	President of the Labour Party; 1937–1950	Succeeded by Arnold Nordmeyer
