= Tom Brindle (politician) =

New Zealand politician (1878–1950)

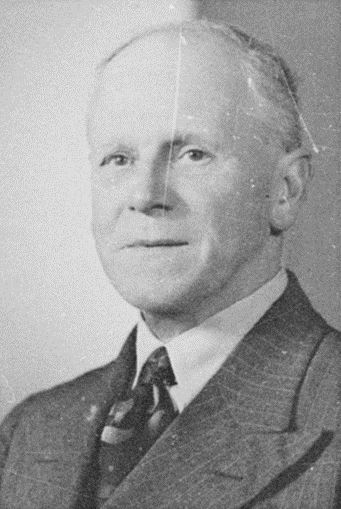

6th President of the Labour Party
- In office 7 July 1922 – 7 April 1926
- Vice President: John Archer (1922–1925); Jim Thorn (1926)
- Leader: Harry Holland
- Preceded by: Frederick Cooke
- Succeeded by: Bob Semple

Member of the New Zealand Legislative Council
- In office 9 March 1936 – 8 March 1950
- Appointed by: Michael Joseph Savage

Wellington City Councillor
- In office 1933–1941

Personal details
- Born: 1878 Manchester, Lancashire, England
- Died: 19 November 1950 (aged 72) Ōtaki, New Zealand
- Party: Labour Party
- Other political affiliations: Social Democrat

Thomas Brindle (1878 – 19 November 1950) was a New Zealand activist for the New Zealand Labour Party who was jailed during World War I for speaking out against conscription. He was a member of Wellington City Council and stood for election to the House of Representatives five times. He was a member of the Legislative Council from 1936 until March 1950.

== Early life in England ==
Brindle was born in Manchester, Lancashire, England, in 1878. In England, he was active in the Independent Labour Party.

== Political career ==
Brindle emigrated to New Zealand in 1910 or 1912, and he became active with the Social Democratic Party (SDP). He was jailed in 1916 during World War I for speaking out against conscription. In 1918 he was nominated by the SDP for the Labour nomination in the Wellington South by-election, but was defeated by Bob Semple. He stood for secretaryship of the New Zealand Labour Party in 1919, but withdrew and Michael Joseph Savage became the first full-time paid secretary. Brindle stood again in 1920, but lost the ballot. From 1922 to 1926, he was the 6th President of the Labour Party.

Brindle unsuccessfully stood five times for the House of Representatives. In 1919 and 1922, he was one of three candidates in the Gisborne electorate, and he came last on both occasions. In 1925, he was one of three candidates in the Nelson electorate, and he again came last. In 1928 and 1931, he was one of three candidates in the Wellington Suburbs electorate, and he came second on both occasions.

Brindle was first elected to Wellington City Council in 1933 after standing unsuccessfully several times prior and remained on the city council until 1941, the same year all Labour local body members in Wellington lost their seats. He was also a member of the Wellington Fire Board. He was appointed to the Legislative Council by the First Labour Government under Michael Joseph Savage and was one of 14 new appointments. At the time of his appointment, he lived in Wellington.

In 1935, he was awarded the King George V Silver Jubilee Medal.

Brindle was a member of the New Zealand Legislative Council from 9 March 1936 to 8 March 1943; and 9 March 1943 to 8 March 1950.

== Death ==
Brindle died on 19 November 1950 at his home in Ōtaki.

== Notes ==
Party political offices
Preceded by Frederick Cooke	President of the Labour Party; 1922–1926	Succeeded by Bob Semple
