= Bob Semple =

New Zealand politician (1873–1955)

The Honourable Bob Semple
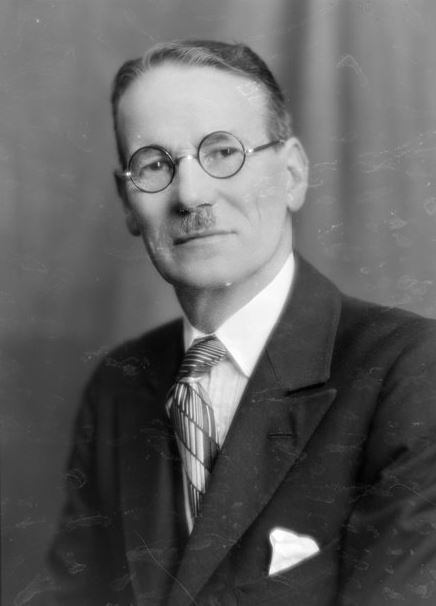
- Bob Semple in 1935

21st Minister of Public Works
- In office 8 November 1942 – 13 December 1949
- Prime Minister: Peter Fraser
- Preceded by: Tim Armstrong
- Succeeded by: Stan Goosman
- In office 6 December 1935 – 21 January 1941
- Prime Minister: Michael Joseph Savage; Peter Fraser
- Preceded by: John Bitchener
- Succeeded by: Tim Armstrong

14th Minister of Railways
- In office 12 December 1941 – 13 December 1949
- Prime Minister: Peter Fraser
- Preceded by: Dan Sullivan
- Succeeded by: Stan Goosman

Member of the New Zealand Parliament for Miramar Wellington East (1928–1946)
- In office 14 November 1928 – 13 November 1954
- Preceded by: Thomas Forsyth
- Succeeded by: Bill Fox

7th President of the Labour Party
- In office 7 April 1926 – 12 April 1928
- Vice President: Jim Thorn (1926-7); John Archer (1927-8)
- Leader: Harry Holland
- Preceded by: Tom Brindle
- Succeeded by: John Archer

Member of the New Zealand Parliament for Wellington South
- In office 19 December 1918 – 17 December 1919
- Preceded by: Alfred Hindmarsh
- Succeeded by: George Mitchell

Personal details
- Born: 21 October 1873 Sofala, New South Wales, Australia
- Died: 31 January 1955 (aged 81) New Plymouth, New Zealand
- Party: Labour
- Spouse: Margaret Semple

Robert Semple (21 October 1873 – 31 January 1955) was a union leader and later minister of public works for the first Labour Government of New Zealand. He is also known for creating the Bob Semple tank.

== Early life ==
Semple was born in Sofala, New South Wales, Australia. He started working at an early age as a gold miner in Australia. In 1903 he was involved in a miner's strike in Victoria, Australia. The strike was defeated and Semple ended up being blacklisted.

To avoid the blacklist Semple moved to the West Coast of the South Island of New Zealand. By 1907 he was president of the Runanga Miner's Union and earned himself nickname 'Fighting Bob Semple'.

He was jailed in 1913 for supporting the general strike and again in 1916 after fighting conscription for overseas service during World War I. Semple served as the president of the Labour Party from 1926 to 1928.

Semple was a member of the Wellington City Council for a decade between 1925 and 1935. In 1935 he unsuccessfully stood for mayor of Wellington, coming runner-up to Thomas Hislop. His wife Margaret was also a Wellington City councillor from 1938 to 1941.

== Parliamentary career ==
New Zealand Parliament
| Years | Term | Electorate | Party |
|---|---|---|---|
| 1918–1919 | 19th | Wellington South | Labour |
| 1928–1931 | 23rd | Wellington East | Labour |
| 1931–1935 | 24th | Wellington East | Labour |
| 1935–1938 | 25th | Wellington East | Labour |
| 1938–1943 | 26th | Wellington East | Labour |
| 1943–1946 | 27th | Wellington East | Labour |
| 1946–1949 | 28th | Miramar | Labour |
| 1949–1951 | 29th | Miramar | Labour |
| 1951–1954 | 30th | Miramar | Labour |

Semple was elected to the seat of Wellington South Parliament for Labour in a 1918 by-election, but lost the seat in the 1919 general election. In 1928 he won the Wellington East seat, and held it until 1946, when it was renamed Miramar. He then held Miramar until 1954, when he retired.

In 1935, he was awarded the King George V Silver Jubilee Medal. Semple was a prolific user of "unparliamentary language" during his time as an MP, and was fond of insulting colleagues by calling or comparing them to Australian animals such as kookaburras, kangaroos and dingoes.

During his term in Parliament, Semple held many important infrastructure portfolios, such as Minister of Public Works (1935–1941, 1942–1943) and Minister of Railways (1941–1949). Semple was seen by many as the public face of the first Labour government's infrastructure investment. He reshaped the Public Works Department by resuming its original function as the development arm of the government by phasing out its focus on relief work from the Great Depression.

During World War II he had built the 'Bob Semple tank', made from corrugated iron and a tractor base. The tank had numerous design flaws and other practical problems and was never put into production. In later life, he became an ardent anti-communist. In 1953, Semple was awarded the Queen Elizabeth II Coronation Medal. He did not seek re-election in the 1954 election, and died in New Plymouth in January 1955.

== Notes ==
Political offices
| Preceded by John Bitchener | Minister of Public Works; 1935–1941 1942–1949 | Succeeded by Tim Armstrong |
| Preceded by Tim Armstrong | Minister of Public Works; 1935–1941 1942–1949 | Succeeded by Stan Goosman |
| Preceded by Dan Sullivan | Minister of Railways; 1941–1949 | Succeeded by Stan Goosman |
New Zealand Parliament
| Preceded by Alfred Hindmarsh | Member of Parliament for Wellington South; 1918–1919 | Succeeded by George Mitchell |
| Preceded by Thomas Forsyth | Member of Parliament for Wellington East; 1928–1946 | Constituency abolished |
| New constituency | Member of Parliament for Miramar; 1946–1954 | Succeeded by Bill Fox |
Party political offices
| Preceded by Tom Brindle | President of the Labour Party; 1926–1928 | Succeeded by John Archer |
