= Robert Wright (New Zealand politician) =

New Zealand politician (1863–1947)

The Honourable Robert Wright JP
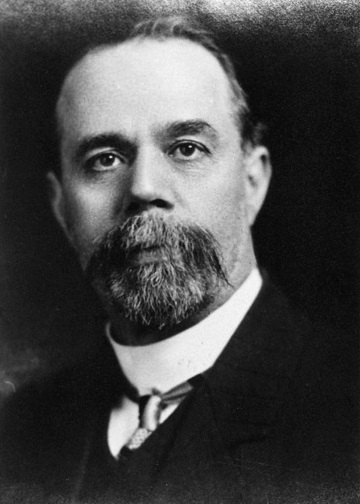

10th Minister of Labour
- In office 28 November 1928 – 10 December 1928
- Prime Minister: Gordon Coates
- Preceded by: George Anderson
- Succeeded by: Bill Veitch

18th Minister of Education
- In office 24 May 1926 – 10 December 1928
- Prime Minister: Gordon Coates
- Preceded by: James Parr
- Succeeded by: Harry Atmore

21st Mayor of Wellington
- In office 11 May 1921 – 13 May 1925
- Preceded by: John Luke
- Succeeded by: Charles Norwood

Member of the New Zealand Parliament for Wellington Suburbs
- In office 10 December 1914 – 15 October 1938
- Preceded by: William Henry Dillon Bell
- Succeeded by: Harry Combs

Member of the New Zealand Parliament for Wellington South
- In office 2 December 1908 – 19 December 1911
- Succeeded by: Alfred Hindmarsh

Personal details
- Born: Robert Alexander Wright; 8 August 1863 Dunedin, New Zealand
- Died: 6 December 1947 (aged 84) Wellington, New Zealand
- Party: Reform (1909–35)
- Spouse: Elizabeth Coulter
- Relations: Hercules Richard Wright (brother)
- Children: 2

Robert Alexander Wright JP (8 August 1863 – 6 December 1947) was the Mayor of Wellington from 1921 to 1925, and a New Zealand politician of the Reform Party.

== Biography ==
=== Early life and career ===
He was born in Dunedin to Robert and Lydia Esther Wright, who moved to Hokitika on the West Coast when he was an infant. He had eight siblings; a brother, Hercules Richard Wright was later a notable Rugby League player. Robert was educated at the Scots Grammar School. He married Elizabeth Coulter from the Wairarapa in 1898, and they had two daughters. He was a printer with the Government Printing Office, then for 17 years with the New Zealand Mail. Then with W. J. Carman he founded the printing firm of Wright and Carman. He was a member of the Church of Christ. On 31 October 1924 Wright opened the de Lux Theatre on the corner of Cambridge Terrace and Majoribanks Street. In 1930 the building was sold and renamed the Embassy Theatre and was the site of the premiere of Lord of the Rings: The Return of the King.

=== Parliamentary career ===
New Zealand Parliament
Years	Term	Electorate	Party
1908–1909	17th	Wellington South	Independent
1909–1911	Changed allegiance to:		Reform
1914–1919	19th	Wellington Suburbs and Country	Reform
1919–1922	20th	Wellington Suburbs	Reform
1922–1925	21st	Wellington Suburbs	Reform
1925–1928	22nd	Wellington Suburbs	Reform
1928–1931	23rd	Wellington Suburbs	Reform
1931–1935	24th	Wellington Suburbs	Reform
1935–1938	25th	Wellington Suburbs	Independent

He represented the Wellington South electorate in Parliament from 1908 to 1911 when he was defeated, then the Wellington Suburbs and Country electorate from 1914 to 1919 and the Wellington Suburbs electorate from 1919 to 1938. In the 1935 contest Wright stood as an independent and was successful. He was defeated for the Wellington West electorate in 1938. In 1935 and 1938 he was not opposed by the National Party, and he habitually voted with National.

He was Minister of Education from 1926 to 1928 in the Reform Government. Towards the end of the Coates Ministry, he was Minister of Labour for less than a fortnight. As Minister of Education he was responsible for a complete revision undertaken in 1927 of the primary school syllabus.

He had the nickname 'Monkey' Wright and in parliament was one of the main Reform MPs who would heckle the Labour Party when it was in opposition. He was particularly critical of Labour's division of credit taunting that Labour's backbenchers were proposing policies not supported by their front bench.

In 1935, Wright was awarded the King George V Silver Jubilee Medal.

He was selected to stand for the National Party for Wellington Suburbs in the 1941 general election, which was postponed to 1943 because of the war.

=== Local politics ===
He first stood for political office in 1912 when he stood for Mayor of Wellington. One of three centre-right candidates he helped split the vote and enabled the Labour candidate David McLaren to win. Wright finished fourth with 1,557 votes (15.06%). Wright was elected to the Wellington City Council in 1913, remaining a councillor for eight years until he stood for and was elected Mayor of Wellington in his second attempt in 1921, the same time as Wellington's first female Councillor, Annie McVicar, was elected. Two years later he faced a strong challenge to re-election when he was opposed by high-profile Labour councillor and MP Peter Fraser. Wright was only narrowly re-elected by 273 votes (just over 1% of the total) which would remain the closest mayoral election in Wellington until 2010. Wright was to remain Mayor until 1925 when he retired from the role.

Wright had three further spells as a member of the city council from 1925 to 1927, 1929 to 1931 and 1935 to 1947. He also made an unsuccessful attempt to return to the council when he stood in a 1933 by-election. Fraser was his main opponent and it was dubbed by the media as a "grudge match" repeat of 1923. Fraser was victorious in a heavy polling contest.

From 1913 to 1921 Wright was a member of the Wellington Harbour Board representing Wellington city before becoming an ex officio member as Mayor of Wellington until 1925.

=== Death ===
He died on 6 December 1947 aged 84 at his home in Kelburn, Wellington.

== Notes ==
Political offices
Preceded by George Anderson	Minister of Labour; 1928	Succeeded by Bill Veitch
Preceded by James Parr	Minister of Education; 1926–1928	Succeeded by Harry Atmore
Preceded by John Luke	Mayor of Wellington; 1921–1925	Succeeded by Charles Norwood
New Zealand Parliament
In abeyance Title last held by John Luke	Member of Parliament for Wellington Suburbs; 1919–1938	Succeeded by Harry Combs
