= Sue Piper =

New Zealand retired trade unionist (born 1951)

Susan Margaret Piper (born 1951) is a retired New Zealand trade unionist and local politician.

== Biography ==
Piper was born in Wellington in 1951. Her parents were Leon Bremmer "Pip" Piper and Margaret Neilson "Tilly" Hunter, both were trade unionists and active members of the Communist Party of New Zealand (CPNZ). As a child Piper and her brother Michael told anyone who would listen that they were communists and accordingly "they expected to share everything we [others] owned." Her mother Tilly divorced her father and remarried in 1959. Tilly had left the CPNZ and joined the Labour Party. Years later from 1993 to 2008 Tilly was Labour MP Annette King's electorate secretary for the Miramar and then the Rongotai electorates, despite not initially supporting King for the Labour nomination, regarding her as a right-winger.

Tilly was an unsuccessful Labour candidate for the Wellington City Council in both 1977 and 1980. She was later awarded a Queen's Service Medal for public services at the 2001 New Year Honours. Her father Pip was also an unsuccessful Labour candidate for the Wellington City Council in both 1986 and 1989 in the Northern Ward.

Piper worked in the public service as an IT worker. Her first job in the public service was at the Department of Agriculture, later shifting to the Department of Statistics. She was involved in the anti-Vietnam War movement and became a member of the Labour Party herself. In 1974 she stood as a Labour candidate for the Wellington City Council, but was unsuccessful. She was on the organising committee of the 1975 United Women's Convention, working alongside leading feminist organisers such as Ros Noonan, Deirdre Milne and Margaret Shields.

Piper worked in a number of unions, including the Clerical Workers Union, the Early Childhood Workers Union and the Public Service Association (PSA), where she was an executive officer from 1982 to 1987. In 1988 she stood for president of the PSA and won with 56,027 votes to 36,790 for PSA vice-president Colin Feslier. She was the first woman to hold the position. Her tenure as president was turbulent, navigating the large scale reforms of industrial relations law in the early 1990s by the Fourth National Government. Teething issues from reforms to how the public service operated following the State Sector Act also required the PSA's attention. In her management of the PSA's internal operations, Piper oversaw the computerisation of the union.

After leaving the PSA Piper was appointed the director of the National Collective of Independent Women's Refuges in 1993. The agency advocated for women and children who were victims of family violence.

In 1992 she stood for the Labour nomination for the seat of Western Hutt ahead of the 1993 election, but lost out to regional councillor and former All Black Ken Gray. A few months later Piper contemplated standing for the Labour Party in the 1992 Wellington Central by-election. When Gray died before he could contest the Western Hutt seat Piper was nominated again for the seat as his replacement. As she lived outside the electorate she was thought an outside chance of winning with no local support base and looked opportunistic. Piper stated that the only reason she had been nominated was that there was in fact local support for her.

Piper was elected a member of the Wellington City Council from 1995 to 2004. In her first term as a councillor she was appointed as chairman of the council's community, culture and recreation committee after the resignation of John Gilberthorpe after his appointment as executive director of the Wellington Museums Trust. After being re-elected in 1998 she became the leader of the Labour members on the council and was a contender for the job of deputy mayor.

She was chair of the Local Government Commission for six years, and chair of Sport Wellington. She has been president of Croquet New Zealand and served on the board of Museum of New Zealand Te Papa Tongarewa.

Trade union offices
Preceded by Colin Hicks	President of the Public Service Association; 1988–1992	Succeeded by Graham Curtis
