= 1921 Wellington mayoral election =

New Zealand local election

1912 Wellington mayoral election
- 27 April 1921
- Turnout: 20,518 (51.90%)
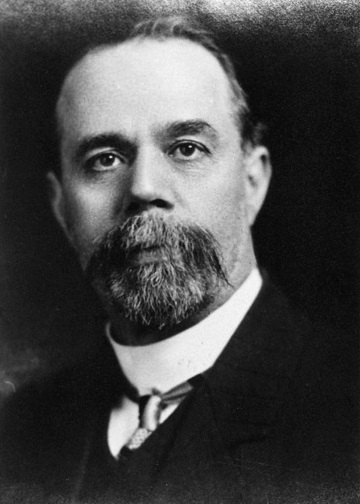

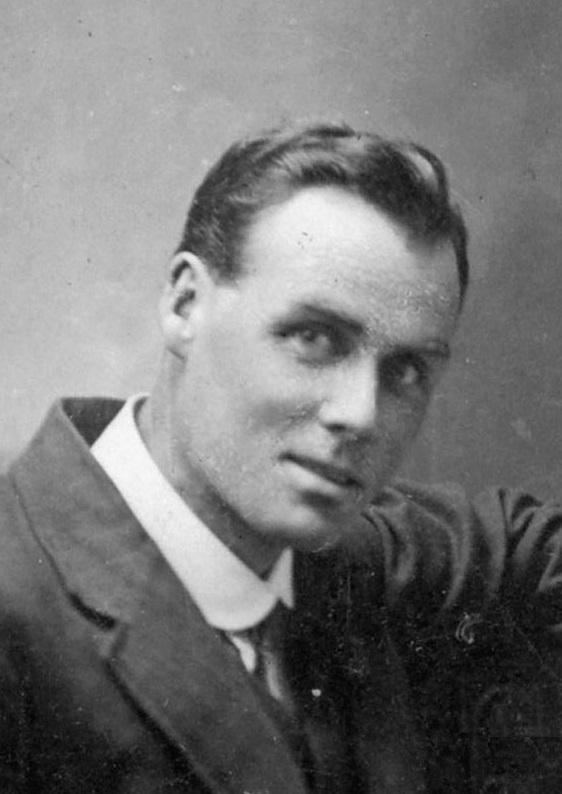
Candidate	Robert Wright	Pat Hickey
Party	Civic League	Labour
Popular vote	13,405	7,113
Percentage	65.33	34.66
Mayor before election
John Luke
Elected mayor
Robert Wright

The 1921 Wellington mayoral election was part of the New Zealand local elections held that same year. In 1921, elections were held for the Mayor of Wellington plus other local government positions including fifteen city councillors. The polling was conducted using the standard first-past-the-post electoral method.

== Background and candidates ==
The long serving incumbent Mayor John Luke did not seek re-election. To replace retiring Mayor Luke five "anti-Labour" candidates emerged, which caused fear of vote splitting and a repeat of the 1912 election. As such, two immediately withdrew and the remaining three agreed to submit to the decision of an impartial committee to decide which one of them was most suitable.

The three aspirants for the Civic League nomination were:

- Len McKenzie, a city councillor since 1911
- Charles Norwood, a city councillor since 1917
- Robert Wright, a city councillor since 1913

Thomas Hislop, a former mayor from 1905 to 1909, also intended to stand as an independent candidate, eschewing the Civic League's nomination process. However, after receiving multiple requests Hislop decided to withdraw from the election.

The Labour Party selected Pat Hickey as its mayoral candidate. Hickey was the editor of the Maoriland Worker newspaper.

Wright defeated Hickey for the mayoralty in a two horse race. The election was also notable due to the success of Annie McVicar, who became the first woman to be elected as a city councillor in Wellington's history.

== Mayoralty results ==
1921 Wellington mayoral election
Party	Candidate	Votes	%	±%
Civic League	Robert Wright	13,405	65.33	
Labour	Pat Hickey	7,113	34.66	
Majority		6,292	30.66	
Turnout		20,518	51.90	−2.21

== Councillor results ==
1921 Wellington City Council election
Party	Candidate	Votes	%	±%
Civic League	Len McKenzie	11,332	55.22	+2.56
Civic League	Charles Norwood	11,141	54.29	+0.15
Civic League	William Gaudin	11,101	54.10	+15.14
Civic League	William Bennett	10,983	53.52	+5.06
Civic League	Martin Luckie	10,646	51.88	+1.83
Civic League	Thomas Forsyth	10,445	50.90	+6.73
Civic League	Benjamin Burn	10,232	49.86	
Civic League	James Dale	9,889	48.19	+2.94
Civic League	John Burns	9,293	45.29	
Civic League	William Thompson	9,056	44.13	+0.24
Labour	Peter Fraser	7,726	37.65	−9.54
Civic League	Annie McVicar	7,690	37.47	
Labour	Charles Chapman	7,333	35.73	−9.50
Civic League	Sydney Underwood	7,300	35.57	
Civic League	Jane Preston	7,016	34.19	
Civic League	Alexander Parton	7,007	34.15	
Independent	John Kerslake	6,733	32.81	
Labour	John Glover	6,394	31.16	−10.14
Labour	Alec Monteith	6,247	30.44	−7.00
Labour	Tom Brindle	5,979	29.14	−10.61
Independent	Dunbar Sloane	5,939	28.94	
Labour	John Read	5,895	28.73	
Labour	Tom Young	5,777	28.15	
Labour	Alec Croskery	5,775	28.14	−10.28
Independent	Edward Vine	5,518	26.89	
Labour	James McKenzie	5,363	26.13	
Labour	Michael Walsh	5,187	25.28	
Labour	Sarah Snow	4,912	23.93	−8.77
Independent	Timothy Buckley	4,752	23.16	
Independent	Frank Meadowcroft	4,702	22.91	−18.36
Independent	Nellie Coad	4,469	21.78	
Labour	Sarah Catlow	4,392	21.40	
Labour	Robert McKeen	4,304	20.97	−11.26
Labour	Frederick Singleton	3,943	19.24	
Labour	Bob Stickney	3,931	19.15	−11.76
Independent	Andrew Hornblow	2,791	13.60	+1.16
Independent	Robert Burbidge	2,783	13.56	
Independent	George Baylis	2,388	11.63	
Independent	James Muir	1,795	8.74	
Independent	Patrick Cavanagh	1,275	6.21	
