= 1912 Wellington mayoral election =

New Zealand local election

- 25 April 1912
- Turnout: 10,333 (34.40%)
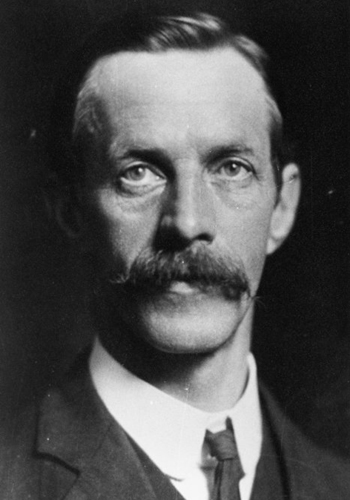

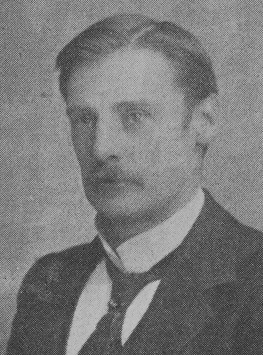

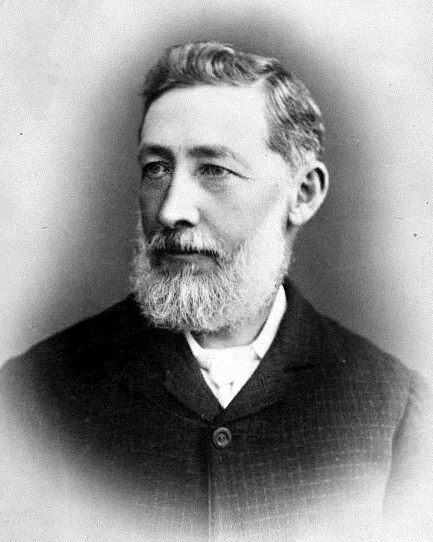

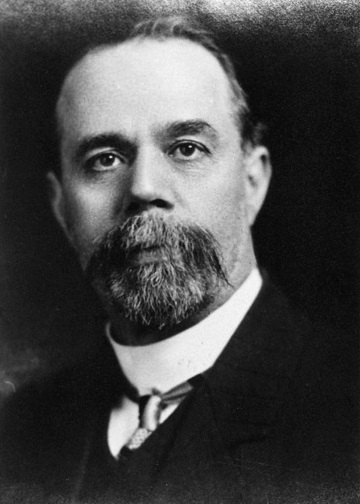
Candidate	David McLaren	Augustus Biss
Party	United Labour	Independent
Popular vote	4,235	2,634
Percentage	40.98	25.49
Candidate	John Smith	Robert Wright
Party	Citizens League	Independent
Popular vote	1,907	1,557
Percentage	18.45	15.06
Mayor before election
Thomas Wilford
Elected mayor
David McLaren

The 1912 Wellington mayoral election was part of the New Zealand local elections held that same year. In 1911, elections were held for the Mayor of Wellington plus other local government positions. Thomas Wilford, the incumbent Mayor, resigned due to ill health and did not contest the ensuing election. David McLaren was elected to office as the new Mayor of Wellington, beating three other contenders and becoming the city's first Labour Mayor. The polling was conducted using the standard first-past-the-post electoral method.

== Background ==
Thomas Wilford had been Mayor of Wellington since his election in 1910. An ailing Wilford stood for re-election in 1911 and was unopposed for office. However, his illness worsened and he almost died after complications during an operation for appendicitis from which his health was to never truly recover. Wilford was forced to travel to England for medical treatment. For several months councillor John Smith had acted as Mayor on his behalf before Wilford formally resigned. Smith decided to stand for the position proper himself in the ensuing election. After serving for 11 years as a Wellington City Councillor and 12 years as a member of the Hospital Board, David McLaren stood for the mayoralty.

== Results ==
The following table gives the election results:

1912 Wellington mayoral election
Party	Candidate	Votes	%	±%
United Labour	David McLaren	4,235	40.98	
Independent	Augustus Biss	2,634	25.49	
Citizens League	John Smith	1,907	18.45	
Independent	Robert Wright	1,557	15.06	
Majority		1,601	15.49	
Turnout		10,333	34.40	

== Outcome ==
As a result of his victory, McLaren became the first Labour mayor of a major city in New Zealand. Due to McLaren's win at the polls for mayor his seat on the city council was declared vacant. A by-election was held for it a month later where his colleague in the labour movement, Edward Tregear, was successful in winning.
