= 1923 Wellington mayoral election =

New Zealand local election

- 27 April 1923
- Turnout: 25,707 (59.26%)
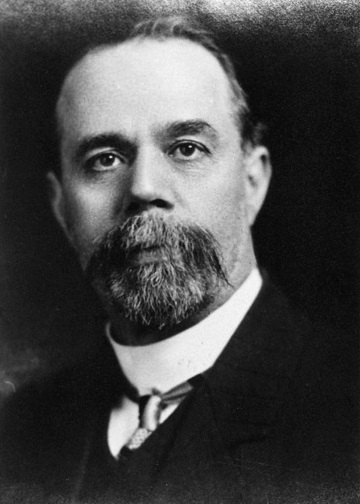

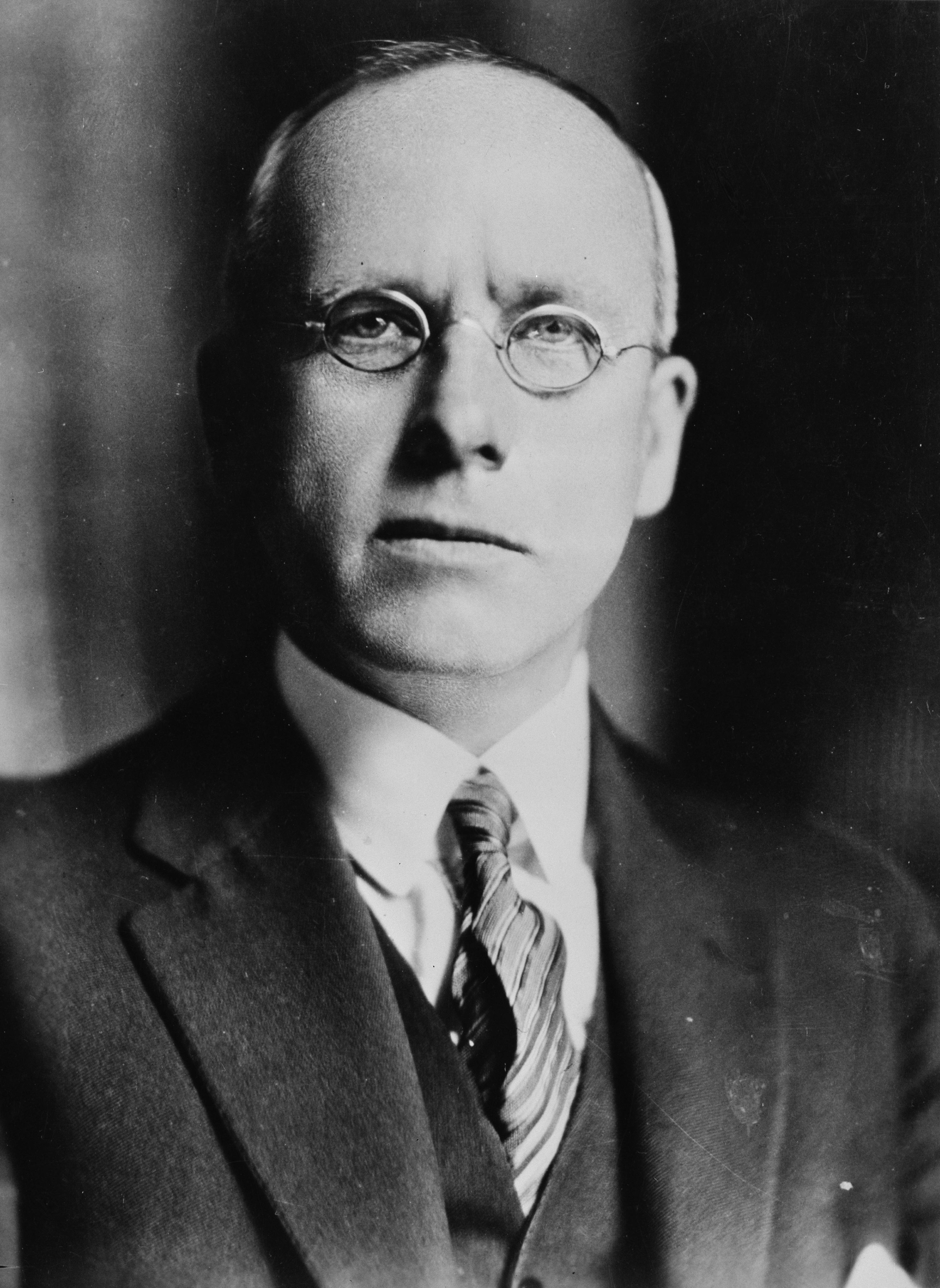

Candidate	Robert Wright	Peter Fraser	Len McKenzie
Party	Civic League	Labour	Independent
Popular vote	10,876	10,603	4,228
Percentage	42.30	41.24	16.44
Mayor before election
Robert Wright
Elected mayor
Robert Wright

The 1923 Wellington mayoral election was part of the New Zealand local elections held that same year. In 1923, elections were held for the Mayor of Wellington plus other local government positions including fifteen city councillors. The polling was conducted using the standard first-past-the-post electoral method.

== Background ==
Incumbent mayor Robert Wright was narrowly re-elected for a second term seeing off a strong challenge from local Labour MP Peter Fraser, the closest election result Wellington had ever seen. It would remain the narrowest Mayoral election in Wellington until 2010.

== Mayoralty results ==
1923 Wellington mayoral election
Party	Candidate	Votes	%	±%
Civic League	Robert Wright	10,876	42.30	−23.30
Labour	Peter Fraser	10,603	41.24	
Independent	Len McKenzie	4,228	16.44	
Majority		273	1.06	−29.60
Turnout		25,707	59.26	+7.36

== Councillor results ==
1923 Wellington City Council election
Party	Candidate	Votes	%	±%
Civic League	George Mitchell	14,375	55.91	
Civic League	William Gaudin	13,174	51.24	−2.90
Civic League	Henry Bennett	12,748	49.58	
Civic League	William Bennett	12,674	49.30	−4.22
Civic League	Martin Luckie	12,468	48.50	−3.38
Civic League	Thomas Forsyth	12,377	48.14	−2.76
Civic League	Benjamin Burn	12,087	47.01	
Civic League	John Burns	11,838	46.04	+0.75
Civic League	Frank Meadowcroft	11,798	45.89	+22.98
Labour	Charles Chapman	11,375	44.24	+8.51
Civic League	John Aston	10,830	42.12	
Civic League	William Thompson	10,782	41.94	−2.19
Labour	Alec Monteith	10,306	40.09	+9.65
Civic League	Alexander Parton	10,152	39.49	+5.34
Civic League	Annie McVicar	10,060	39.13	+1.66
Labour	Robert McKeen	9,911	38.55	+17.58
Labour	Alexander Croskery	9,898	38.50	+10.36
Civic League	Herbert Huggins	9,603	37.35	
Civic League	Colin Crump	9,563	37.19	
Labour	John Glover	9,509	36.98	+5.82
Labour	Tom Young	9,302	36.18	+8.03
Labour	James McKenzie	8,754	34.05	+7.92
Labour	Tom Brindle	8,519	33.13	+3.99
Independent	John Castle	8,234	32.03	
Labour	Michael Walsh	7,947	30.91	+5.63
Independent	Lewis Glover	7,473	29.06	
Independent	Harold Dyson	7,107	27.64	
Independent	Clarence Snow	7,056	27.44	
Labour	Walter Bromley	6,971	27.11	
Labour	Laurence Hennessy	6,907	26.86	
Independent	Joseph Trim	6,535	25.42	
Independent	James Doherty	4,344	16.89	
Independent	Andrew Hornblow	4,304	16.74	+3.10
Independent	George Baylis	3,714	14.44	−2.81
Independent	Henry Bodley	3,533	13.74	
