= Ros Noonan =

New Zealand politician and trade unionist

Ros Noonan CNZM
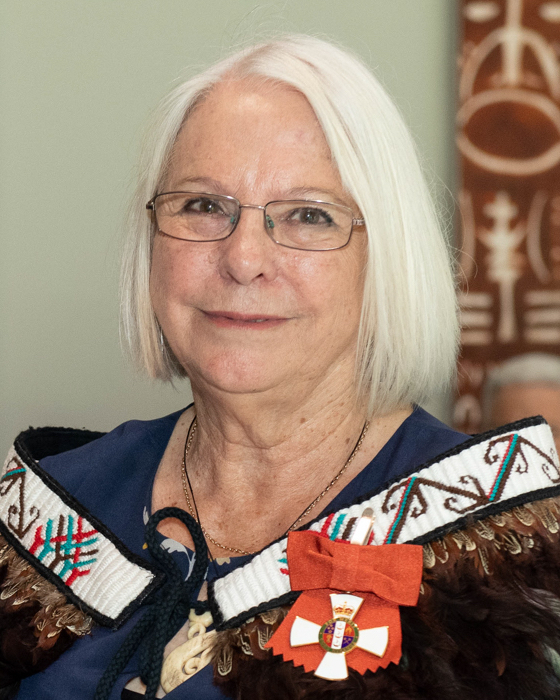
- Noonan in 2021

Chief Human Rights Commissioner of New Zealand
- In office 17 May 2001 – 31 August 2011
- Preceded by: Pamela Jefferies
- Succeeded by: David Rutherford

Member of the Wellington City Council
- In office 11 October 1980 – 11 October 1986
- Constituency: At-large

Personal details
- Born: Rosslyn Joy Shaw; 1946 (age 79–80)
- Party: Labour
- Spouse: Michael A. Noonan
- Children: 2
- Education: University of Auckland
- Profession: Trade unionist

Rosslyn Joy Noonan CNZM (née Shaw; born 1946) is a New Zealand politician and trade unionist. She was an organiser for several trade unions and the Labour Party and served for a time in local government. Later she served as New Zealand's Human Rights Commissioner.

== Biography ==
=== Early life ===
Noonan was born Rosslyn Joy Shaw was born in 1946 to journalist parents. Her father was Trevor Shaw, who worked as a reporter for The New Zealand Herald. Much of her early childhood was spent overseas, first in Nigeria and the then in the Belgian Congo before returning to New Zealand and completing her secondary education at Auckland Girls' Grammar School. She later married Michael A. Noonan, a New Zealand filmmaker and producer with whom she had two children.

=== Political career ===
Noonan joined the Labour Party in her youth and while studying at Auckland University joined the famous Princes Street branch. She was the first in her family to attend university where she studied history and focused on the emergence of trade unions and wrote her MA thesis on the unemployed riots of 1932 during the Great Depression. Her history professor was Michael Bassett, himself later a Labour MP. In the lead up to the 1975 election she challenged Porirua MP (and pro-life advocate) Gerry Wall for the Labour Party nomination. She was critical of Wall's members bill to close private abortion clinics, but was unsuccessful in her challenge. She was on the organising committee of the 1975 United Women's Convention, working alongside leading feminist organisers such as Sue Piper, Deidre Milne and Margaret Shields.

In 1980 Noonan unsuccessfully contested the Wellington mayoralty against Michael Fowler. Despite losing the mayoralty, she was elected for two terms as a councillor on a Labour ticket between 1980 and 1986. She was one member of the "troika" (a group of three female Labour councillors alongside Helene Ritchie and Hazel Bibby) who frequently opposed Fowler around the council table. It culminated in 1982, when Ritchie successfully passed a motion officially declaring Wellington a nuclear-free zone. Also during her time on the council she led the opposition to proposals to privatise city council housing. Arguing that the provision of low-cost, affordable housing was of enormous benefit to the city which had flow-on benefits to ratepayers. Wellington ended up keeping the state housing, one of the few councils that did so. Under Fowler's successor as mayor Ian Lawrence, Noonan opposed his decision in 1985 to disallow a petition to force a ratepayers' poll on the issue of water and sewerage and not allow councillors to see it. In a meeting she asked Lawrence how he reconciled the withholding of the petition given a recent extension of the Official Information Act 1982 to cover local authorities. At the next council meeting, Lawrence was accused of being "obstructive, undemocratic and frustrating the course of justice" which caused walkouts and verbal attacks. The sewerage issue plagued Lawrence for the rest of his mayoralty and led to his defeat at the next election. In 1987 she turned down the offer to be Labour's candidate at the Otari Ward by-election saying she had insufficient time to be both a councillor as well as fulfill her duties with the Royal Commission on Social Policy, to which she had been recently appointed.

She was in favour of homosexual law reform in New Zealand and listed her name openly in support.

In 1990, Noonan was awarded the New Zealand 1990 Commemoration Medal.

=== Other activities ===
Noonan was involved with trade unionism and entered the field herself via the Kindergarten Teachers' Association. From there she launched her career with the unions and worked for the New Zealand Educational Institute, including eight years as its national secretary from 1988 to 1996. She then left for a position as the human rights coordinator for Education International, an international teachers' organisation in Brussels.

She later returned to New Zealand in March 2001 to succeed Pamela Jefferies as New Zealand's Human Rights Commissioner. She held that position for over a decade until stepping aside in August 2011. In 2018, she was appointed to head a review panel of the family court system in New Zealand by Justice Minister Andrew Little.

In the 2020 Queen's Birthday Honours, Noonan was appointed a Companion of the New Zealand Order of Merit, for services to human rights.

Noonan's husband, Michael, died in 2023.

== Publications by Noonan ==
- Noonan, Rosslyn J. (1969). The riots of 1932 : a study of social unrest in Auckland, Wellington, Dunedin (MA). Auckland: University of Auckland. OCLC 152541040.
- Noonan, Rosslyn J. (1975). By design : a brief history of the Public Works Department Ministry of Works 1870-1970. Wellington: Ministry of Works and Development. OCLC 229355033.

== Notes ==
Cultural offices
Preceded by Pamela Jefferies	Chief Human Rights Commissioner; 2001–2011	Succeeded by David Rutherford
