= 1989 Wellington mayoral election =

New Zealand local election

- 14 October 1989
- Turnout: 52,588 (49.94%)
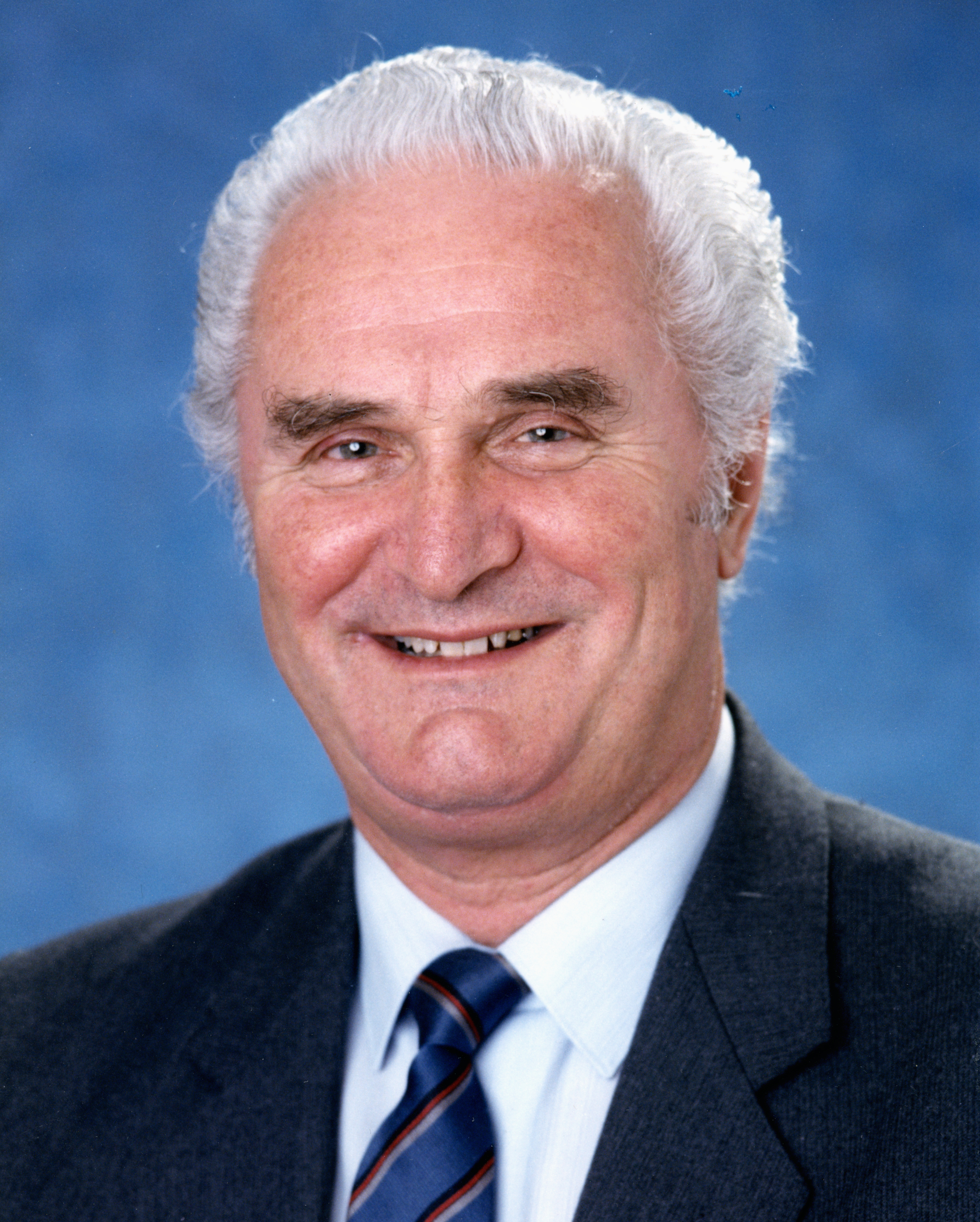

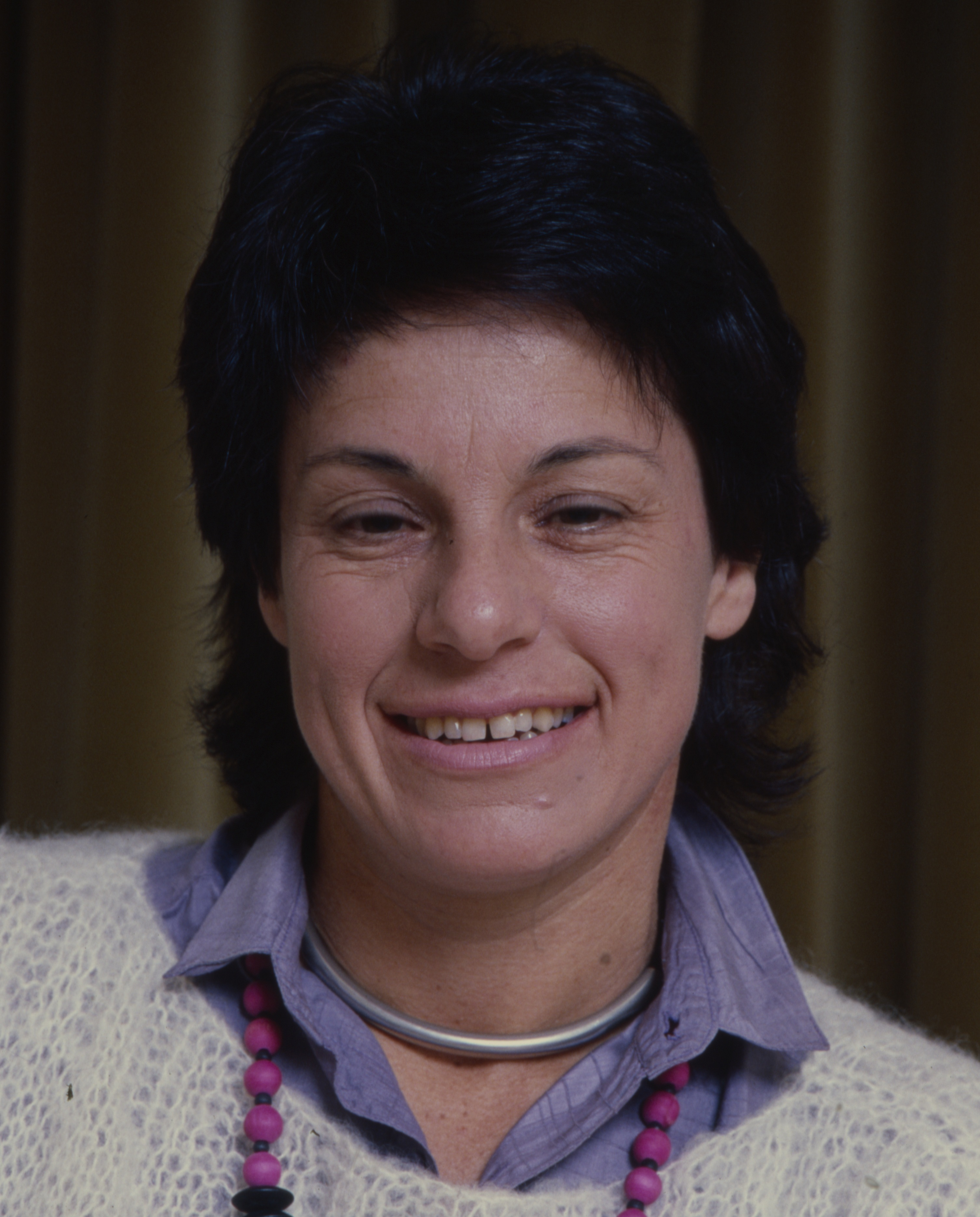

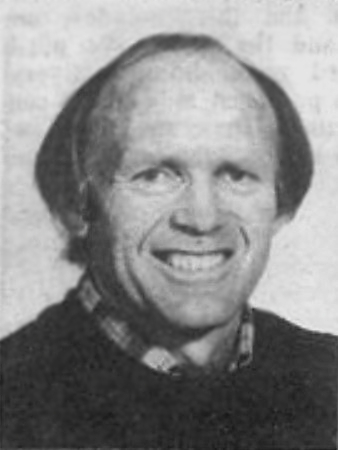
Candidate	Jim Belich	Helene Ritchie	Rex Nicholls
Party	Labour	Independent	Citizens'
Popular vote	15,198	14,266	14,183
Percentage	28.90	27.12	26.97
Mayor before election
Jim Belich
Labour
Elected mayor
Jim Belich
Labour

The 1989 Wellington mayoral election was part of the New Zealand local elections held that same year. In 1989, elections were held for the Mayor of Wellington plus other local government positions including twenty-one city councillors. The polling was conducted using the standard first-past-the-post electoral method.

== Background ==
The 1989 local elections were the first following a major overhaul of local government in New Zealand. The existing Wellington City Council remained in place but greatly expanded, absorbing several of the neighbouring authorities including the Tawa Borough Council and land on the waterfront formerly in the possession of the Wellington Harbour Board. This was the first local election in Wellington to allow postal voting, though polling booths were still available for use.

The race for the mayoralty was bitterly fought with both sides of local politics in Wellington fighting internal divisions as well as each other. Mayor Jim Belich stood for a second term opposed by his former deputy Helene Ritchie who had left Labour after she was removed as deputy-mayor the previous year. The Citizens' Association also had rival candidates running against each other with Rex Nicholls running as the officially endorsed candidate with former Citizens' leader on the council David Bull and ex-councillor Roger Ridley-Smith running as an independent candidates after losing the nomination to Nicholls. As such, the race was characterised by vote splitting and provided a very closely spread result.

Actor Kevin Woodill, who played the role of William Hobson in Depot Theatre's production of Pigeon English, sought to stand for mayor as "William Hobson" in protest of local body amalgamation. However he was unable to stand as an alias could not be used on a ballot paper, though they could campaign under whatever name they liked.

The council vote was likewise indecisive with no one group having control of the council. The Labour Party had lost its majority from three years earlier with the Citizens' Association winning a plurality and becoming the largest group on the council. 1989 also saw the emergence of the Green Party which won a seat on the council, the first third party to do so since 1977. Stephen Rainbow won a seat in the Lambton Ward and became the country's first ever Green councillor.

== Mayoralty results ==
The following table gives the election results:

1989 Wellington mayoral election
Party	Candidate	Votes	%	±%
Labour	Jim Belich	15,198	28.90	−21.68
Independent	Helene Ritchie	14,266	27.12	
Citizens'	Rex Nicholls	14,183	26.97	
Independent Citizens'	David Bull	4,372	8.31	
Independent	Roger Ridley-Smith	1,963	3.73	
McGillicuddy Serious	John Morrison	1,015	1.93	
Private Enterprise	Frank Moncur	200	0.38	−0.29
Informal votes		1,391	2.64	−1.86
Majority		932	1.77	−4.53
Turnout		52,588	49.94	+8.17

=== Results by ward ===
Rex Nicholls polled the highest in three of the seven of Wellington's electoral wards while Jim Belich and Helene Ritchie each polled the highest in two.

Wards won by Belich
Wards won by Ritchie
Wards won by Nicholls

	Jim Belich		Helene Ritchie		Rex Nicholls		Others		Total
Ward	#	%	#	%	#	%	#	%	#
Eastern	3,290	30.3	2,944	27.1	3,122	28.8	1,500	13.9	10,856
Lambton	1,925	32.0	1,496	24.9	1,836	30.5	757	12.6	6,014
Northern	1,814	25.6	2,292	32.4	1,354	19.1	1,619	22.8	7,079
Onslow	1,658	28.8	1,137	19.8	1,786	31.1	1,186	20.6	5,747
Tawa	1,059	21.2	1,301	26.1	1,309	26.3	1,306	26.2	4,975
Southern	2,948	32.1	3,006	32.7	2,044	22.2	1,195	13.1	9,193
Western	2,504	28.7	2,090	24.0	2,732	31.4	1,378	15.8	8,704
Total	15,198	28.9	14,266	27.1	14,183	26.9	7,550	14.3	52,588

== Ward results ==
Candidates were also elected from wards to the Wellington City Council.

Party/ticket	Councillors
Citizens'	9
Labour	7
Greens	1
Independent	4
