= Wellington Citizens' Association =

- Founded: 1907
- Dissolved: 2001
- Ideology: Fiscal conservatism Nonpartisanism; Localism
- Political position: Centre-right
- Colours: Blue & White
- Slogan: Advance Wellington!

The Wellington Citizens' Association, was a right-leaning local body electoral ticket in Wellington, New Zealand. It was formed in 1911 by merging the selection process of council candidates of several civic interest groups and business lobby groups. Its main ambitions were to continue to control the Wellington City Council, reduce local spending and deny left-leaning Labour Party candidates being elected.

== History ==
The Citizens' Association was founded in 1907 under the name of the Wellington Citizens League, created with the goal of electing "desirable" candidates to the Wellington City Council to represent the needs of businessmen in the local community. In 1921 the Citizens League was renamed as the Civic League a name it would retain until changing names again to the Citizens' Association in 1932 in the lead up to the 1933 civic elections. The body grew from the earlier Civic League organisation and also absorbed the Greater Wellington Electors' Association and Ratepayers' Association to jointly nominate and endorse candidates for local government. It picked candidates from applicants for Wellington's mayoralty, City Council, Harbour Board and Hospital Board. Despite several publicly embarrassing selection controversies (such as in 1950, 1956 and 1965), the Citizens' Association controlled the council from the time of its inception until finally losing its decades long majority in 1986 when the Labour Party won its first ever majority with Labour's Jim Belich also capturing the mayoralty for Labour. It was less successful in controlling the Mayoralty particularly during the 18 year period of 1956–74 when Labour's Frank Kitts was Mayor.

The last time the Citizens' Association contested an election was a 1997 by-election where it backed Ian Hutchings, who finished second in the Northern Ward. In the lead up to the 1998 mayoral election the Citizens' were considering contesting the mayoralty, with councillor Chris Parkin seen as the most likely candidate. Ultimately it did not contest any seats at the election, instead endorsing the Wellington Alive ticket for the city and regional council. In 1999 it blocked former councillor Bryan Weyburne's attempt to create a new "Citizens and Ratepayers" ticket, arguing it was infringing on the Citizens' Association's name. At the time of the dispute Citizens' Association president Les Stephens stated that the Citizens' were intending to contest the 2001 local elections.

== Relationship with the National Party ==
The Citizens' Association, throughout its entire existence, had no formal link with the National Party (which does not contest local elections) or any other political party. Many times opponents attempted to debunk the Citizens' Association claim to possess an "anti-party" ideology (and thusly contrast themselves from Labour candidates) by linking the two.

The matter surfaced several times such as in the 1977 elections when Labour mayoral candidate Sir Frank Kitts stated that he had been informed by Citizens' Association members that the National Party had been using its head office officials to advise the Citizens' Association about its local election campaign and how best to keep Labour out of local office. The director of the National Party, Barrie Leay, said the claim was "totally untrue" and the Citizens' campaign co-ordinator Michael Veal also denied any contact with the National Party. In 1983 Citizens' leader, and mayoral candidate, Ian Lawrence replied at a husting that he did not know which of his colleagues were or were not National Party members and nor did he care; "It [National membership] is not a criterion. The Citizens' Association of Wellington has no formal connection with the National Party." In 1992, when responding to a jibe that the Citizens' Association were just "the National Party in local body drag", Citizens' president John Liddiard stated "For sure, we have National Party members but we also have people who aren't aligned to a political party."

Unmistakably however, several Citizens' councillors (such as Charles Bowden, Allan Highet and Arthur Kinsella) were National MPs and many more (including Will Appleton, Ernest Toop and Michael Fowler) have stood unsuccessfully for parliament as National candidates. Between 1938 and 1966 alone there were 11 Citizens' candidates who stood as National Party candidates demonstrating a presence of joint membership, informal or otherwise.

== Electoral results ==
=== Council seats ===
Year	no. of seats won	% of seats	±
1907	9 / 15	60.0%	▲9
1909	11 / 15	73.3%	▲2
1911	10 / 15	66.6%	▼1
1913	9 / 15	60.0%	▼1
1915	13 / 15	86.6%	▲4
1917	14 / 15	93.3%	▲1
1919	9 / 15	60.0%	▼5
1921	13 / 15	86.6%	▲4
1923	13 / 15	86.6%	0
1925	12 / 15	80.0%	▼1
1927	11 / 15	73.3%	▼1
1929	12 / 15	80.0%	▲1
1931	11 / 15	73.3%	▼1
1933	7 / 15	46.6%	▼4
1935	9 / 15	60.0%	▲2
1938	9 / 15	60.0%	0
1941	15 / 15	100.0%	▲6
1944	15 / 15	100.0%	0
1947	15 / 15	100.0%	0
1950	8 / 15	53.3%	▼7
1953	9 / 15	60.0%	▲1
1956	9 / 15	60.0%	0
1959	12 / 15	80.0%	▲3
1962	11 / 15	73.3%	▼1
1965	10 / 15	66.6%	▼1
1968	10 / 15	66.6%	0
1971	8 / 15	53.3%	▼2
1974	12 / 18	66.6%	▲4
1977	10 / 18	55.5%	▼2
1980	10 / 18	55.5%	0
1983	9 / 18	50.0%	▼1
1986	9 / 21	42.8%	0
1989	9 / 21	42.8%	0
1992	6 / 21	28.5%	▼3
1995	4 / 18	22.2%	▼2

=== Mayoralty ===
Year	Candidate	Popular vote	Percentage	Result	+/-
1910	Thomas Wilford	6,248	54.26	Elected	1st
1911	Thomas Wilford	Unopposed		Elected	1st
1912	John Smith	1,907	18.45	Unelected	3rd
1913	John Luke	9,997	51.29	Elected	1st
1914	John Luke	11,555	56.44	Elected	1st
1915	John Luke	9,987	53.56	Elected	1st
1917	John Luke	Unopposed		Elected	1st
1919	John Luke	7,361	42.57	Elected	1st
1921	Robert Wright	13,405	65.33	Elected	1st
1923	Robert Wright	10,876	42.30	Elected	1st
1925	Charles Norwood	13,180	52.87	Elected	1st
1927	George Troup	12,549	54.45	Elected	1st
1929	George Troup	14,407	60.97	Elected	1st
1931	Thomas Hislop	13,593	52.68	Elected	1st
1933	Thomas Hislop	Unopposed		Elected	1st
1935	Thomas Hislop	21,505	53.08	Elected	1st
1938	Thomas Hislop	24,368	56.85	Elected	1st
1941	Thomas Hislop	19,919	63.92	Elected	1st
1944	Will Appleton	29,899	58.80	Elected	1st
1947	Will Appleton	27,000	54.17	Elected	1st
1950	Robert Macalister	17,582	52.02	Elected	1st
1953	Robert Macalister	21,809	48.78	Elected	1st
1956	Ernest Toop	11,920	31.28	Unelected	2nd
1959	Ernest Toop	17,680	48.47	Unelected	2nd
1962	Bill Arcus	10,821	31.79	Unelected	2nd
1965	Matt Benney	11,966	38.64	Unelected	2nd
1968	Bob Archibald	9,569	33.91	Unelected	2nd
1971	Alex O'Shea	9,915	31.37	Unelected	2nd
1974	Michael Fowler	14,980	41.36	Elected	1st
1977	Michael Fowler	17,041	40.92	Elected	1st
1980	Michael Fowler	17,964	51.63	Elected	1st
1983	Ian Lawrence	19,952	49.28	Elected	1st
1986	Ian Lawrence	16,519	44.62	Unelected	2nd
1989	Rex Nicholls	14,183	27.70	Unelected	3rd
1992	Ken Comber	8,751	15.31	Unelected	3rd
1995	Nigel Gould	4,414	7.08	Unelected	4th

Citizens' Mayors

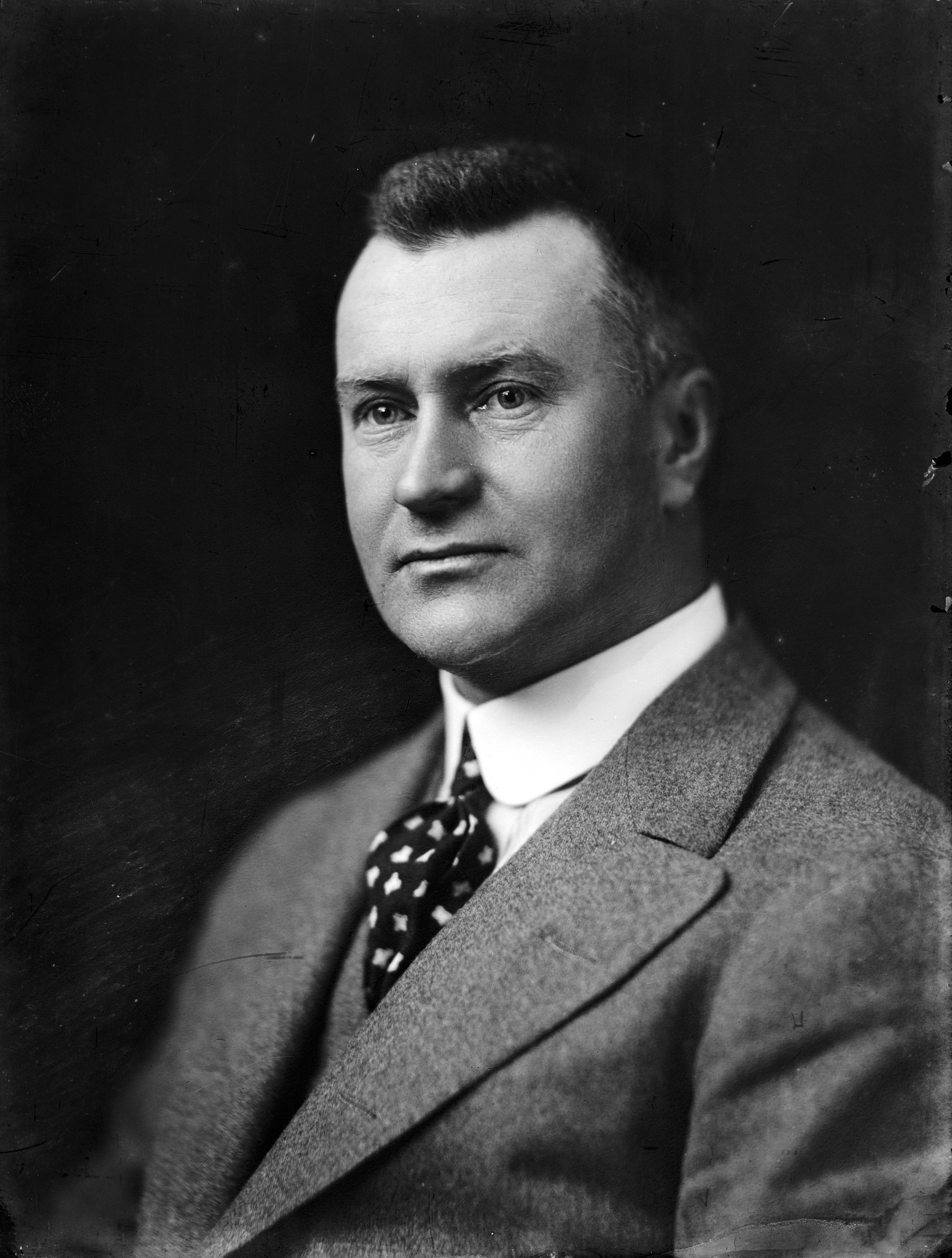
Sir Thomas Wilford
(1910–1912)

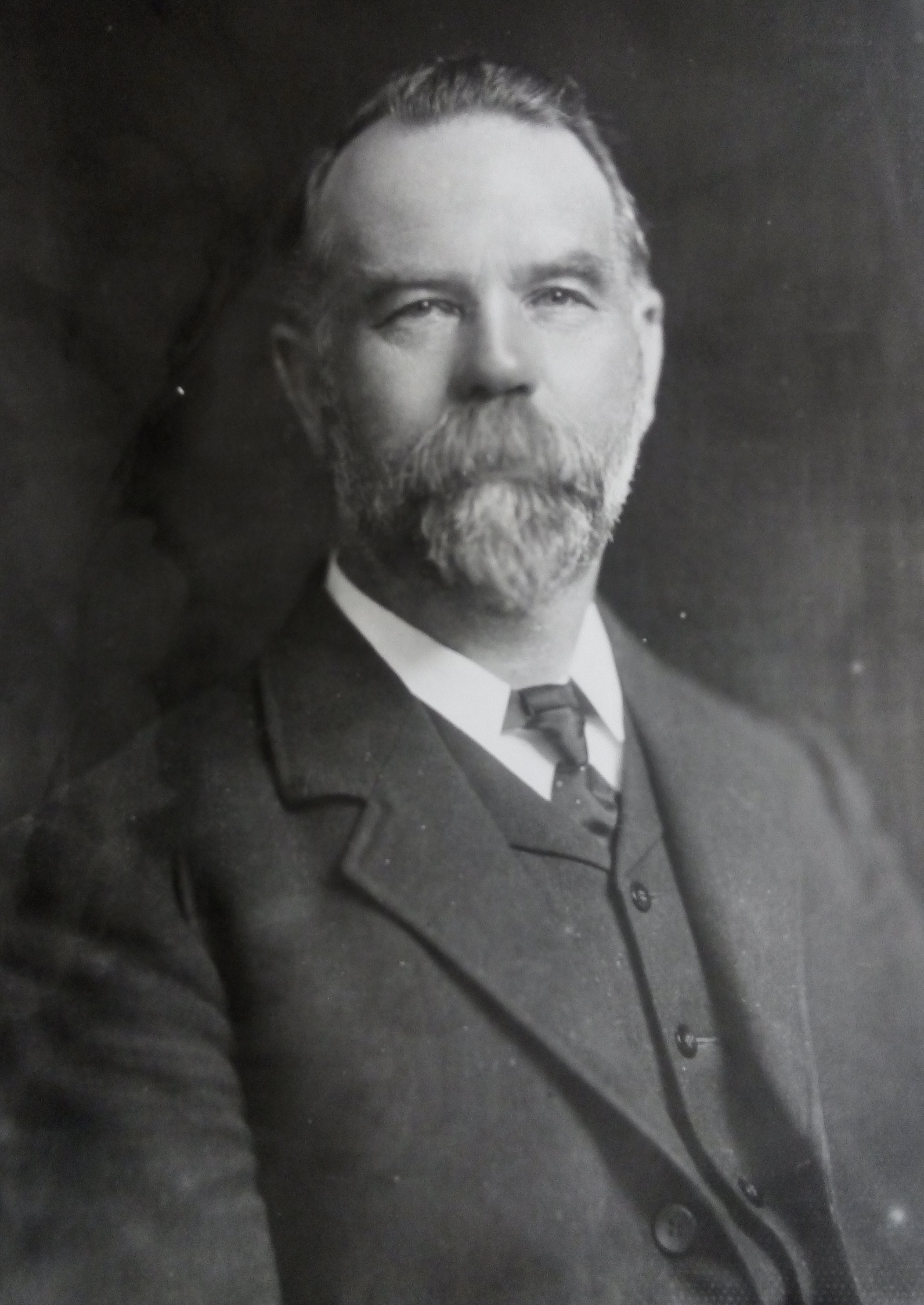
Sir John Luke
(1913-1921)

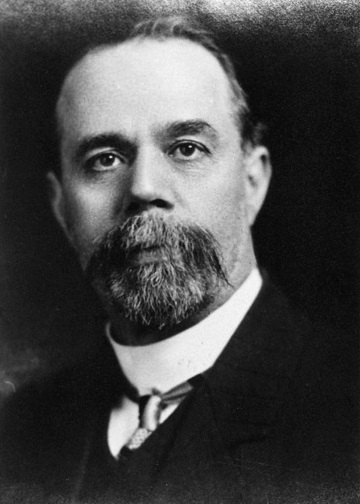
Robert Wright
(1921-1925)

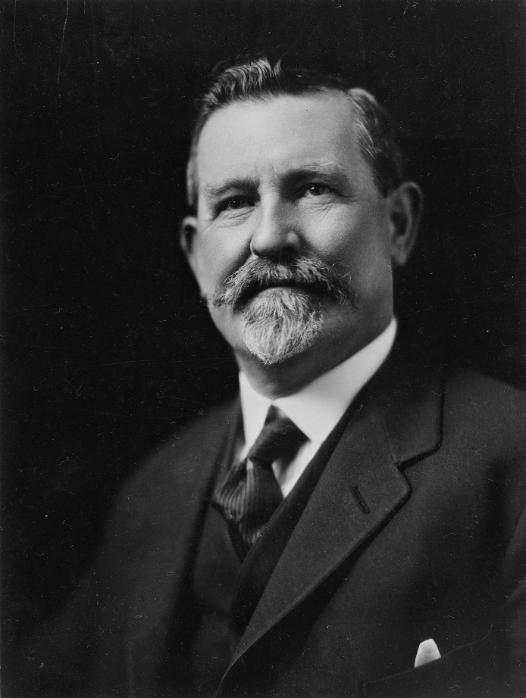
Sir Charles Norwood
(1925-1927)

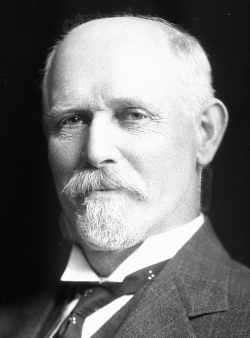
Sir George Troup
(1927–1931)

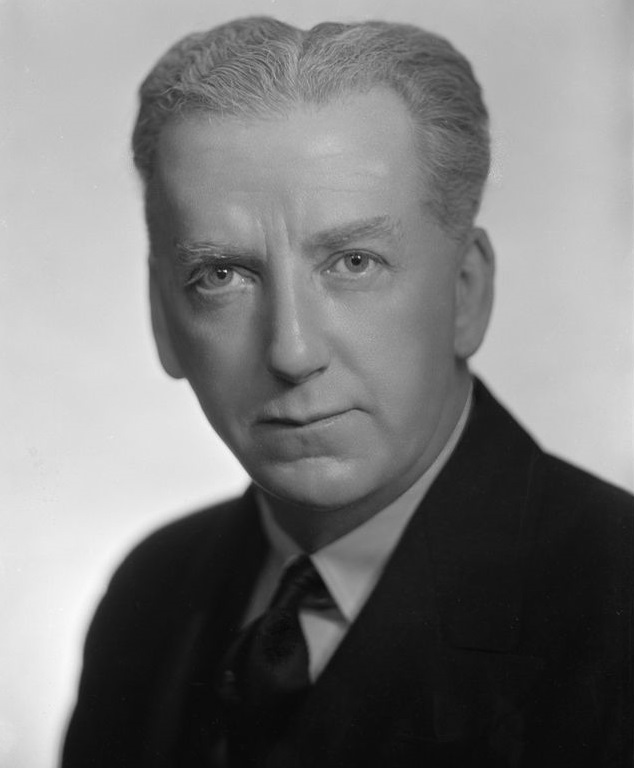
Thomas Hislop
(1931-1944)

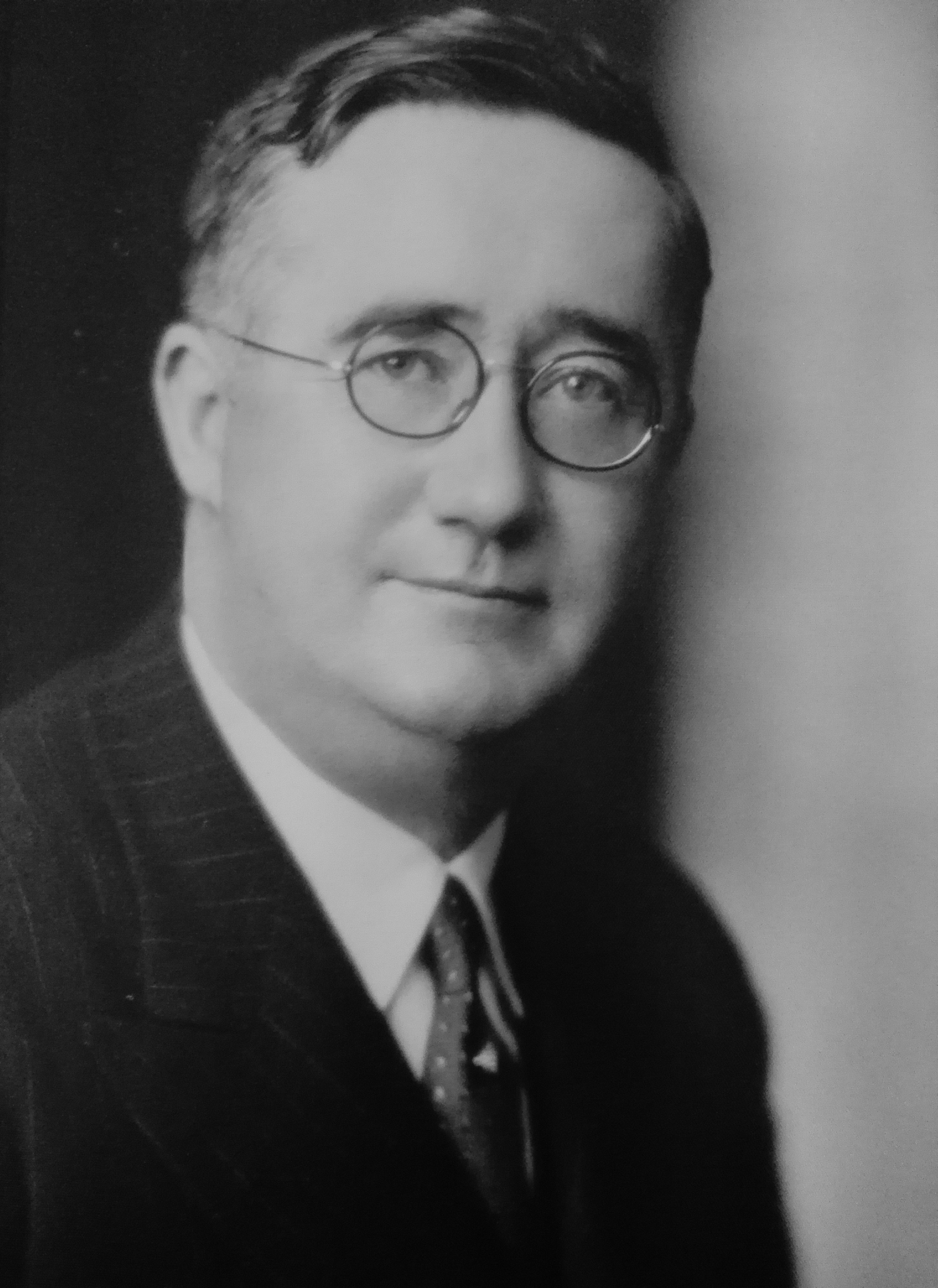
Sir Will Appleton
(1944-1950)

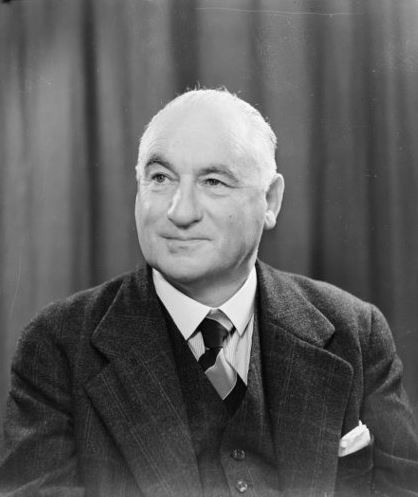
Sir Robert Macalister
(1950-1956)

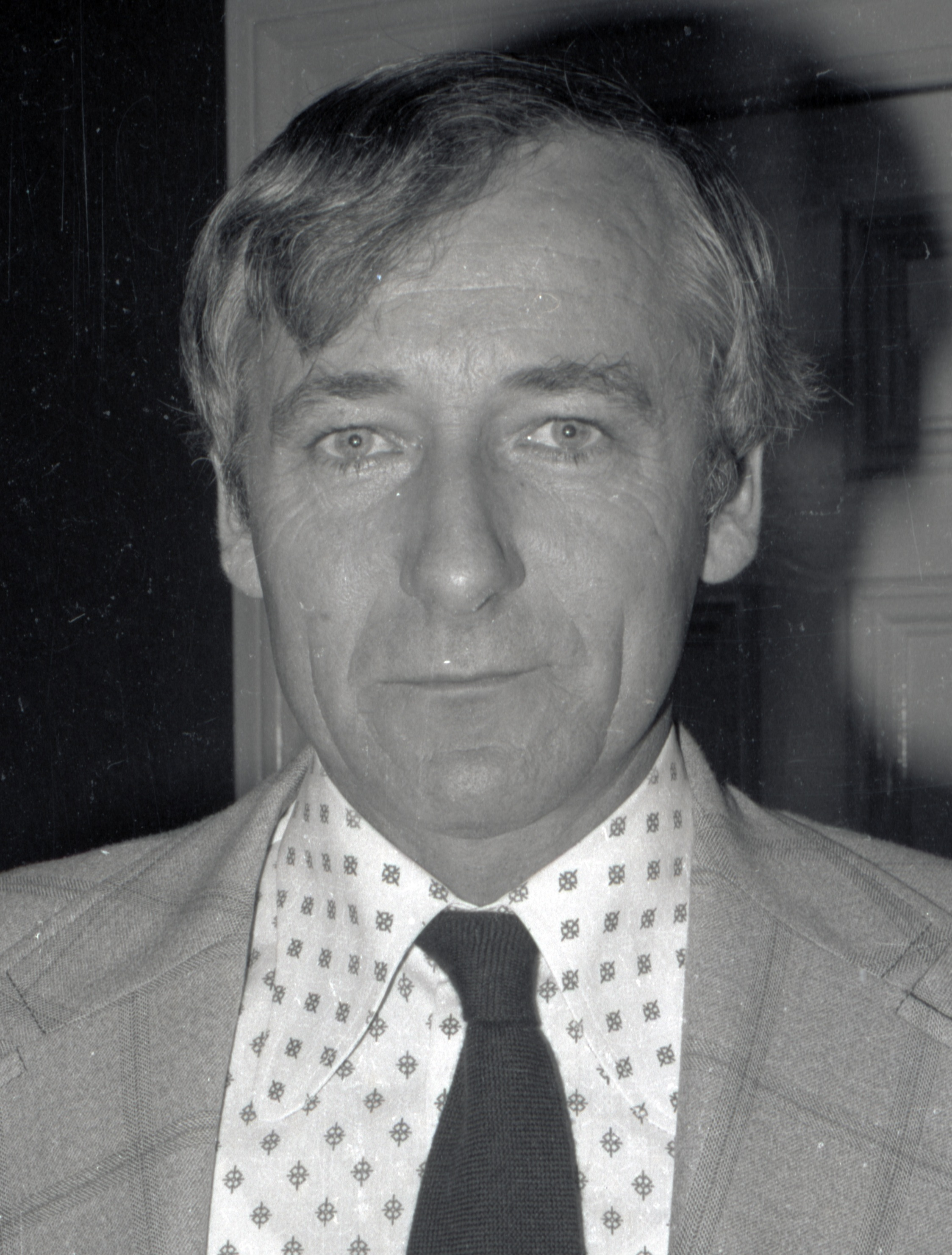
Sir Michael Fowler
(1974-1983)

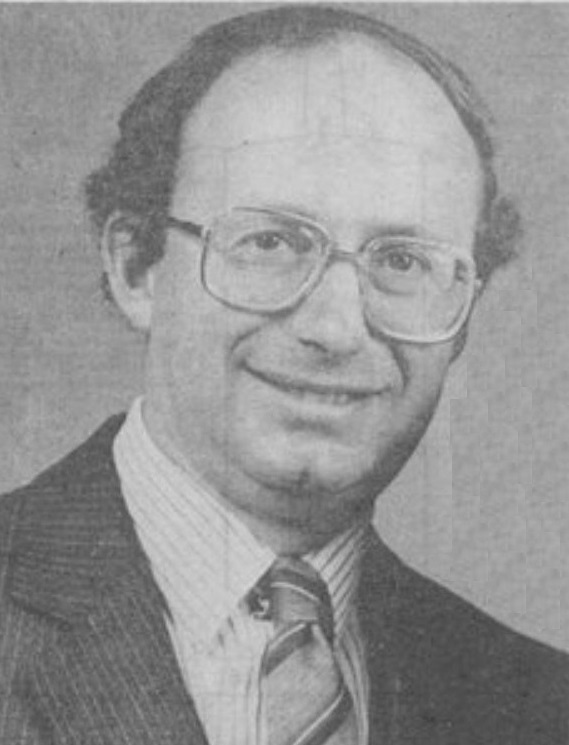
Ian Lawrence
(1983-1986)
