= 1935 Wellington mayoral election =

New Zealand local election

- 7 May 1935
- Turnout: 41,139 (60.49%)
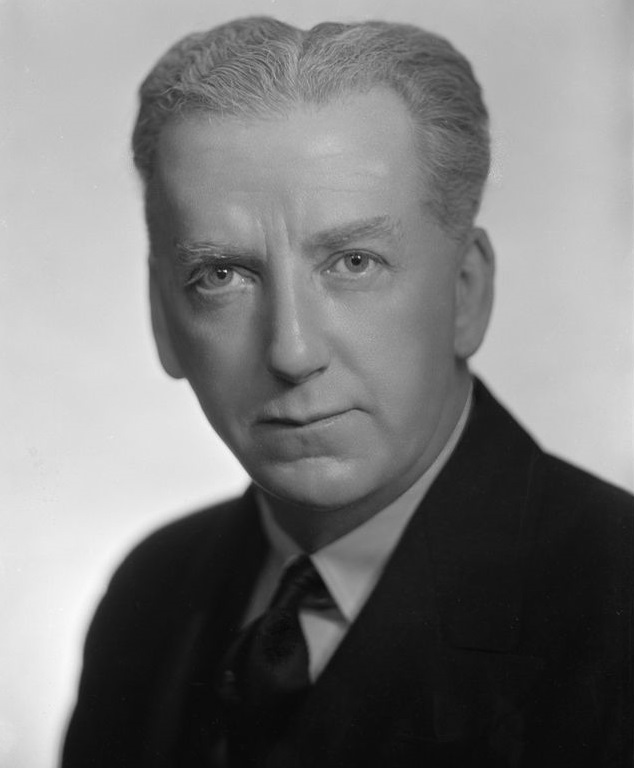

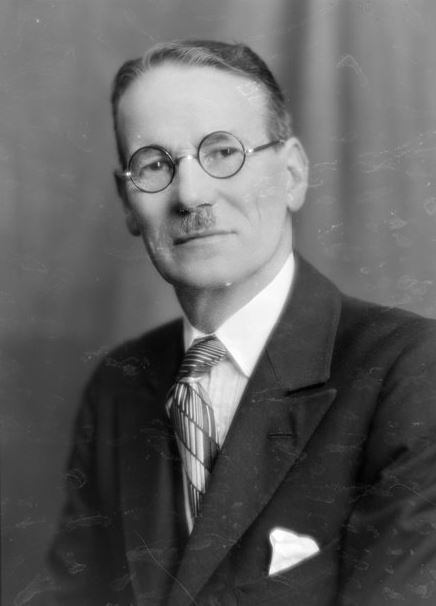
Candidate	Thomas Hislop	Bob Semple
Party	Citizens'	Labour
Popular vote	21,583	19,249
Percentage	52.46	46.79
Mayor before election
Thomas Hislop
Elected mayor
Thomas Hislop

The 1935 Wellington mayoral election was part of the New Zealand local elections held that same year. In 1935, elections were held for the Mayor of Wellington plus other local government positions including fifteen city councillors. The polling was conducted using the standard first-past-the-post electoral method.

== Background ==
Incumbent mayor Thomas Hislop stood for a third-term, the first mayor to do so since Sir John Luke in 1915. His opponent was Bob Semple, a Labour councillor and MP for Wellington East. During the campaign, Semple received slanderous allegations of being an Atheist, which he denied stating "If the people of the world followed the philosophy of Jesus there would be no poverty...".

For the second election in a row, Labour won a majority of the vote, but could not win a majority of seats. However, Labour did win one more seat than in 1933 and then went on to win a by-election soon after increase their representation further.

== Mayoralty results ==
1935 Wellington mayoral election
Party	Candidate	Votes	%	±%
Citizens'	Thomas Hislop	21,583	52.46	
Labour	Bob Semple	19,249	46.79	
Informal votes		307	0.74	
Majority		2,334	5.67	
Turnout		41,139	60.49	

== Councillor results ==
1935 Wellington City Council election
Party	Candidate	Votes	%	±%
Labour	Peter Fraser	28,362	68.94	+20.30
Labour	Charles Chapman	26,049	63.31	−3.11
Labour	Robert McKeen	25,571	62.15	−2.22
Citizens'	Robert Wright	22,450	54.57	+7.26
Labour	Peter Butler	20,646	50.18	+6.32
Labour	Tom Brindle	20,345	49.45	+3.56
Citizens'	William Bennett	19,930	48.44	−4.10
Citizens'	John Burns	19,063	46.33	+1.88
Citizens'	Will Appleton	19,036	46.27	−1.95
Citizens'	William Gaudin	18,944	46.04	−6.85
Citizens'	Martin Luckie	18,616	45.25	−3.54
Citizens'	Len McKenzie	18,579	45.16	−2.85
Labour	Adam Black	18,559	45.11	+4.88
Citizens'	Herbert Huggins	18,467	44.88	−2.27
Citizens'	William Duncan	18,309	44.50	−2.43
Labour	Andrew Parlane (Note: Parlane was appointed to fill the vacancy on the council in 1936 caused by Peter Fraser's resignation)	18,271	44.41	+1.75
Labour	Alexander Croskery	18,143	44.10	
Labour	Michael Reardon	18,043	43.85	
Citizens'	Thomas Forsyth	17,827	43.33	−3.16
Labour	John Read	17,648	42.89	
Labour	Jim Collins	17,327	42.11	+1.57
Labour	Michael Walsh	16,970	41.25	+1.46
Labour	John Tucker	16,963	41.23	+1.99
Citizens'	Robert Macalister	16,892	41.06	−2.23
Labour	Caryll Hay	16,343	39.72	+0.90
Labour	James Ranson	16,270	39.54	−0.21
Citizens'	Paul Hoskins	15,592	37.90	+3.94
Communist	Charlie Brooks	3,310	8.04	
Communist	John Joseph Robinson	2,994	7.27	
Communist	Connie Rawcliffe	2,695	6.55	
Communist	Albert Birchfield	2,680	6.51	
Communist	Miles Ormerod	2,153	5.23	

Table footnotes:
