= 1917 Wellington mayoral election =

New Zealand local election

- 14 April 1917
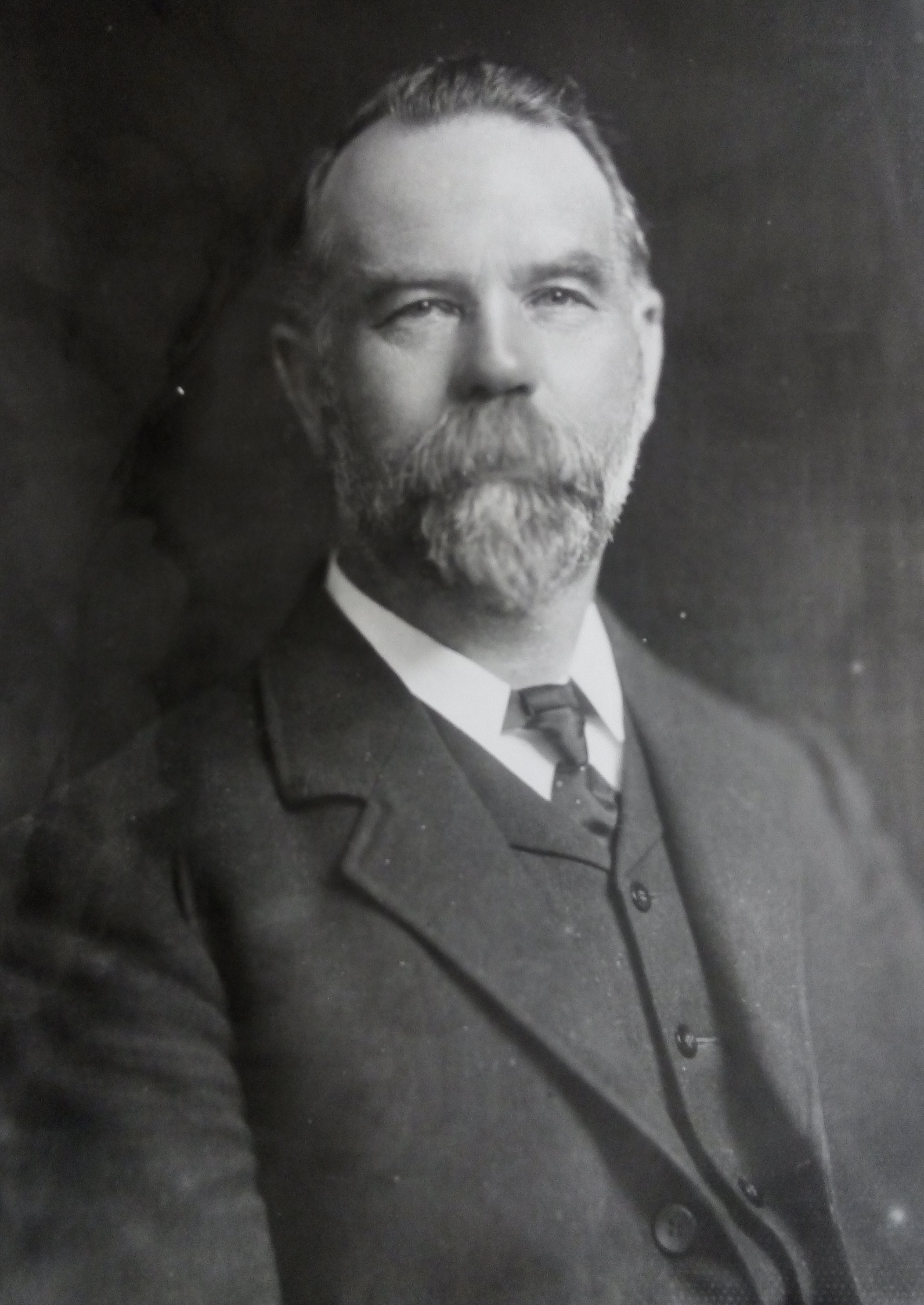
Candidate	John Luke
Party	Citizens League
Popular vote	elected unopposed
Mayor before election
John Luke
Elected mayor
John Luke

The 1917 Wellington mayoral election was part of the New Zealand local elections held that same year. In 1917, elections were held for the Mayor of Wellington plus other local government positions including fifteen city councillors, also elected biannually. The polling was conducted using the standard first-past-the-post electoral method.

== Background ==
John Luke, the incumbent Mayor sought re-election and retained office unopposed with no other candidates emerging. The current Labour Party contested its first election since unification the previous year. It put forward a small ticket that was still large enough to win a majority, however just as in 1915 no Labour candidates were successful.

== Councillor results ==
1917 Wellington City Council election
Party	Candidate	Votes	%	±%
Citizens League	George Frost	7,411	72.90	−15.75
Citizens League	Robert Wright	7,024	69.09	+16.21
Citizens League	Arthur Atkinson	6,797	66.86	+13.20
Citizens League	Len McKenzie	6,498	63.92	+8.60
Citizens League	Martin Luckie	6,239	61.37	+19.03
Citizens League	William Bennett	6,011	59.13	+17.82
Citizens League	Alexander Veitch	6,011	59.13	+19.69
Citizens League	William Barber	5,754	56.60	−0.30
Citizens League	James Godber	5,738	56.44	+8.13
Independent	John Castle	5,386	52.98	
Citizens League	John Shorland	5,258	51.72	
Citizens League	Charles Norwood	5,201	51.16	+22.63
Citizens League	William Hildreth	5,034	49.52	−14.21
Citizens League	John Fitzgerald	4,922	48.42	+2.27
Citizens League	William Thompson	4,842	47.63	+7.46
Labour	John Hutchison	4,551	44.77	
Citizens League	Thomas Bush	4,546	44.72	
Independent	John Swan	4,439	43.66	+10.62
Labour	Harry Holland	4,403	43.31	+13.90
Labour	John Glover	3,995	39.30	+13.88
Labour	James McKenzie	3,961	38.96	
Labour	Charles Chapman	3,864	38.01	
Labour	Edward Kennedy	3,695	36.35	+13.65
Independent	Francis McParland	3,682	36.22	
Independent	John Jenkinson	3,584	35.25	+6.33
Labour	John Read	3,249	31.96	+14.88
Labour	William Wiles	3,078	30.28	
Independent	Edward Perry	2,295	22.57	
