= 1968 Wellington mayoral election =

New Zealand local election

- 12 October 1968
- Turnout: 28,217 (46.5%)
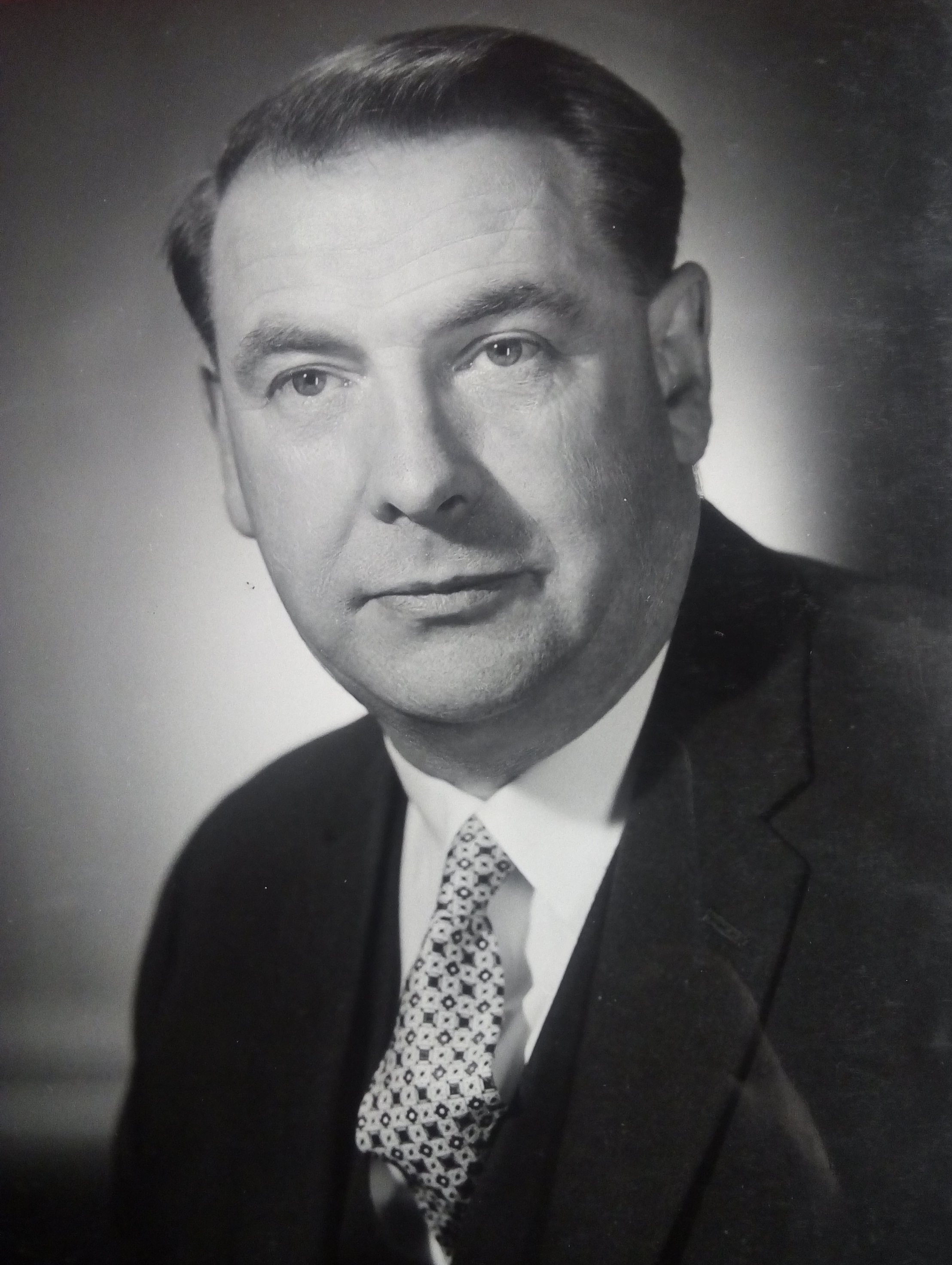

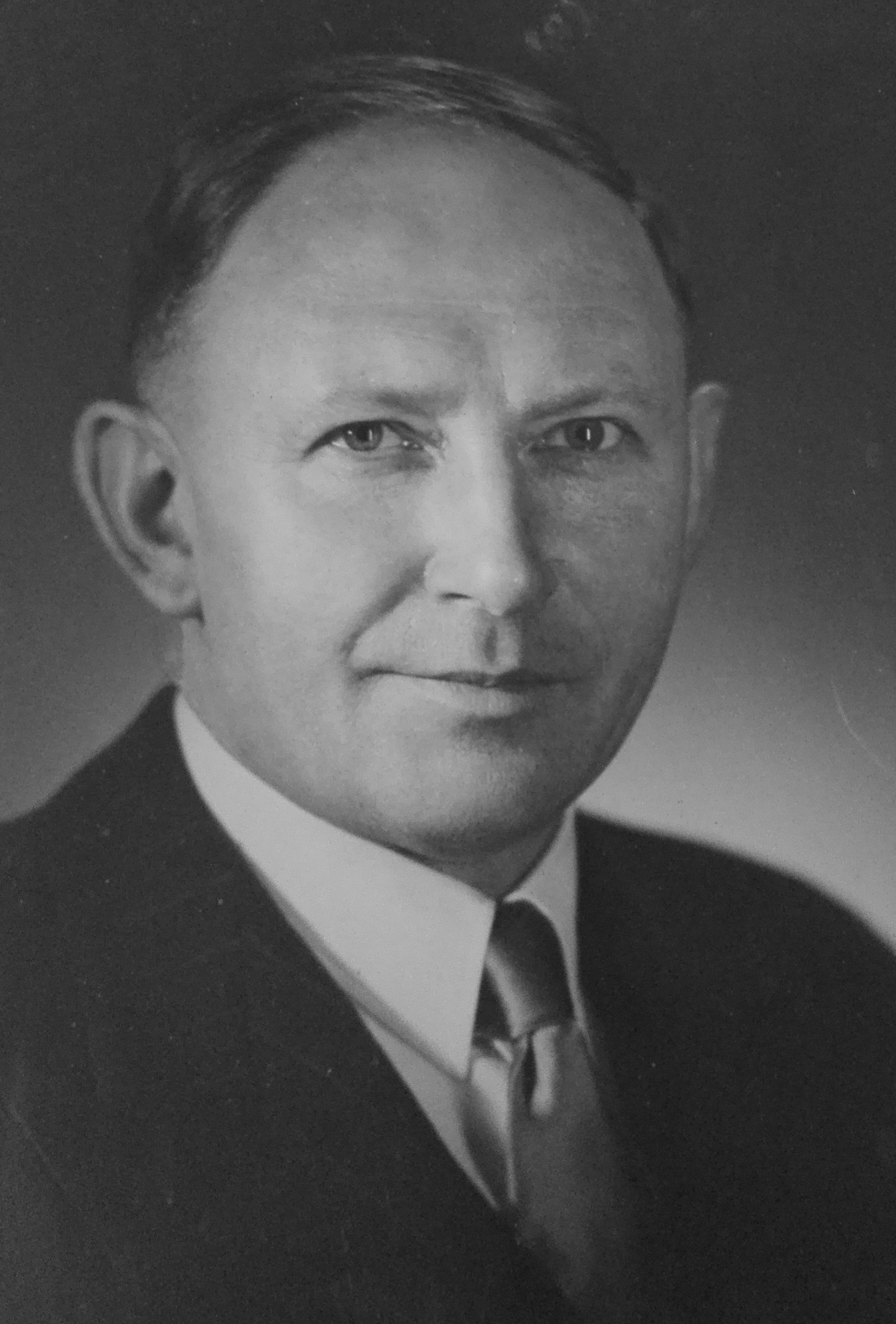
Candidate	Frank Kitts	Bob Archibald
Party	Labour	Citizens'
Popular vote	18,390	9,569
Percentage	65.17	33.91
Mayor before election
Frank Kitts
Labour
Elected mayor
Frank Kitts
Labour

The 1968 Wellington mayoral election was part of the New Zealand local elections held that same year. In 1968, elections were held for the Mayor of Wellington plus other local government positions including fifteen city councillors. The polling was conducted using the standard first-past-the-post electoral method.

== Background ==
Initially, long-serving councillor Denis McGrath announced his candidacy for Mayor on behalf of the Citizens' Association. He withdrew in June after he was appointed President of the New Zealand Law Society and decided not to seek re-election as a councillor either. This generated press speculation that the Citizens' Association would decide not field a candidate. However, despite previously declining to stand, deputy mayor Bob Archibald eventually accepted nomination following a deputation of local businessman requesting that he stand.

Ultimately, Frank Kitts was re-elected mayor for a fifth term. In doing so he won both a record size majority and became Wellington's longest-serving mayor.

== Mayoralty results ==
1968 Wellington mayoral election
Party	Candidate	Votes	%	±%
Labour	Frank Kitts	18,390	65.17	+7.74
Citizens'	Bob Archibald	9,569	33.91	
Informal votes		258	0.91	+0.33
Majority		8,821	31.26	+12.48
Turnout		28,217	46.5	–1.1

== Councillor results ==
1968 Wellington City Council election
Party	Candidate	Votes	%	±%
Labour	Rolland O'Regan	17,652	62.55	+8.52
Labour	John Jeffries	16,926	59.98	+9.35
Citizens'	Bob Archibald	16,216	57.46	+11.18
Citizens'	Stewart Duff	15,972	56.60	+13.16
Labour	Olive Smuts-Kennedy	15,965	56.57	+7.18
Citizens'	George Porter	14,013	49.66	+8.43
Citizens'	John Turk	14,002	49.62	+9.65
Citizens'	Betty Campbell	13,577	48.11	
Citizens'	Gordon Morrison	13,511	47.88	+8.14
Labour	Gerald O'Brien	13,240	46.92	+7.34
Citizens'	William Scollay	12,851	45.54	+6.48
Labour	Keith Spry	12,817	45.42	+6.79
Citizens'	Ron Button	11,903	42.18	
Citizens'	Michael Fowler	11,794	41.79	
Citizens'	Rod Campbell	11,674	41.37	
Labour	Peter Butler	11,084	39.28	+0.72
Labour	Edward Hill	10,889	38.59	+5.31
Citizens'	Les Chapman	10,875	38.54	
Citizens'	Frank Fordham	10,695	37.90	
Labour	Yvonne Grove	10,596	37.55	
Labour	Florence Vincent	10,538	37.34	
Citizens'	George Madgwick	10,027	35.53	
Citizens'	Keith Congreve	9,881	35.01	
Labour	Douglas Foy	9,609	34.05	
Labour	Tony Haas	9,600	34.02	
Labour	Gwendrith Elsie Haine	9,475	33.57	+0.60
Citizens'	Hollis Reed	9,249	32.77	
Labour	Stan Rodger	9,075	32.16	
Labour	Percival Hansen	8,912	31.58	–5.12
Labour	Wilfred Edward Simpson	8,566	30.35	
Independent	Saul Goldsmith	4,594	16.28	+1.60
Independent Liberal	Harry Hughes	3,892	13.79	
Independent	Annette Griffin	3,823	13.54	
Independent	Clevedon Costello	3,407	12.07	
Independent Liberal	Bernard Kaiser	3,341	11.84	
Independent	Donald McMillain	2,911	10.31	
Communist	Ron Smith	1,530	5.42	+2.14
