= 1980 Wellington mayoral election =

New Zealand local election

- 11 October 1980
- Turnout: 34,790 (36.25%)
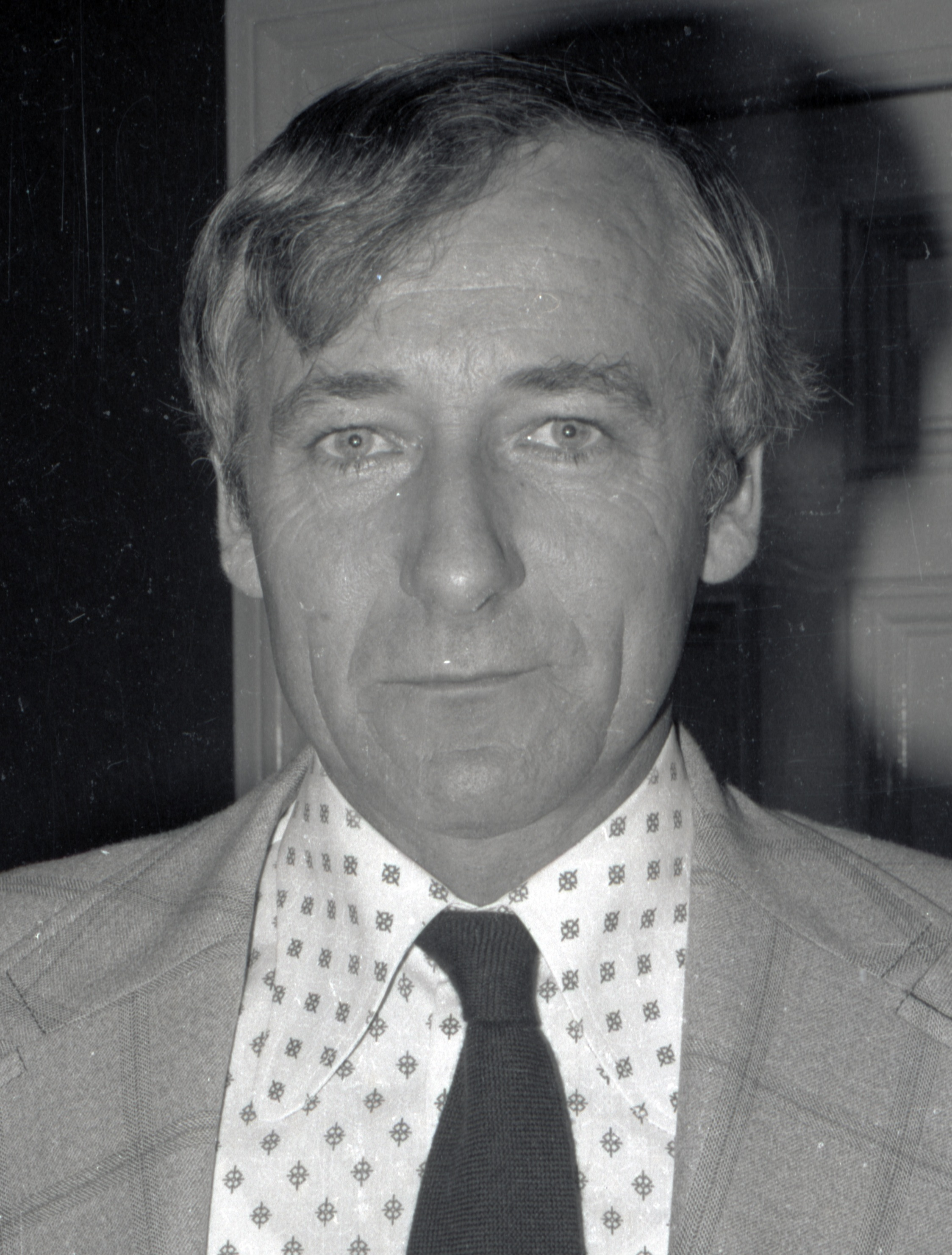

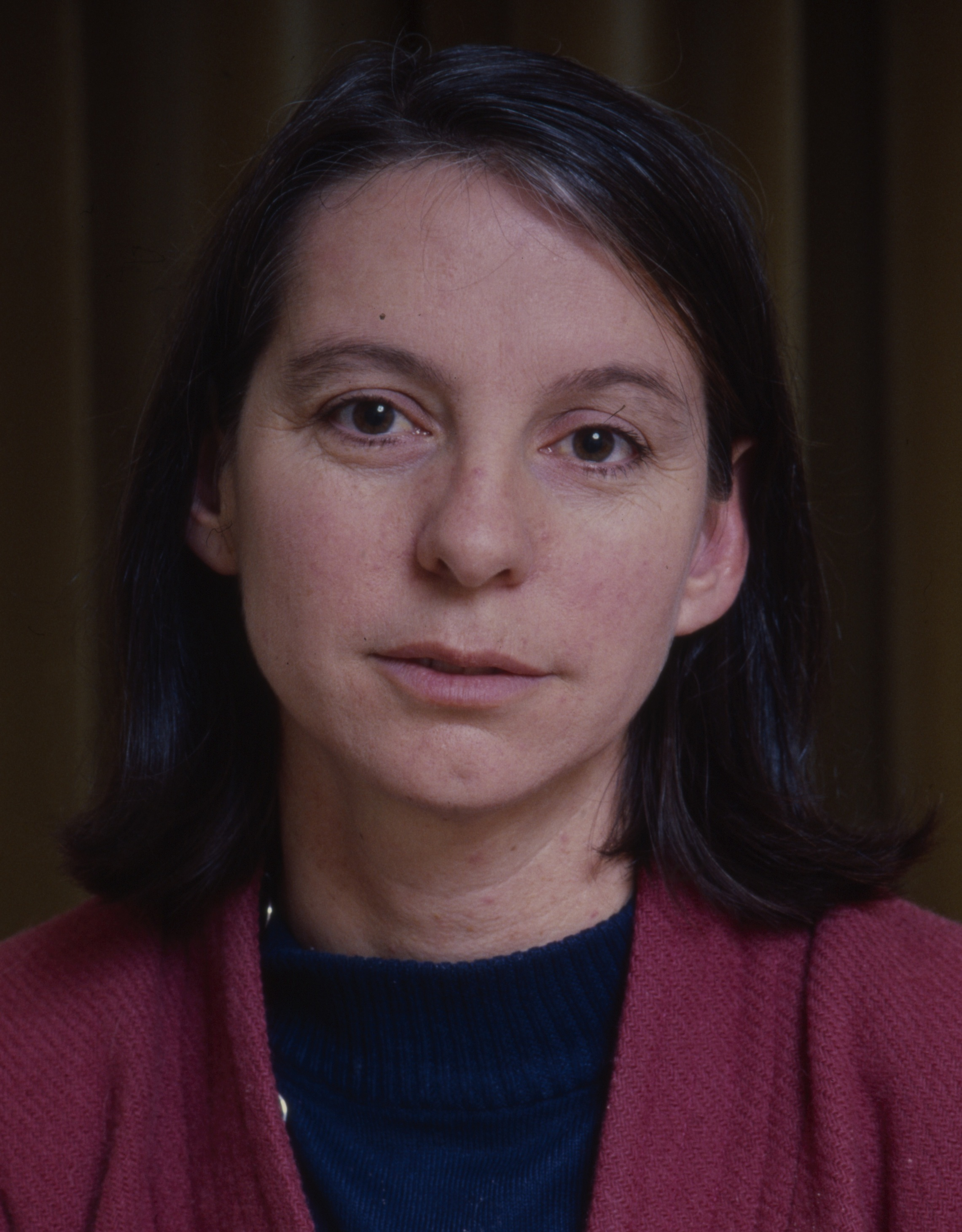

Candidate	Michael Fowler	Ros Noonan	Bryan Weyburne
Party	Citizens'	Labour	Rates Reform
Popular vote	17,964	9,986	5,698
Percentage	51.63	28.70	16.37
Mayor before election
Michael Fowler
Elected mayor
Michael Fowler

The 1980 Wellington mayoral election was part of the New Zealand local elections held that same year. In 1980, election were held for the Mayor of Wellington plus other local government positions including eighteen city councillors. The polling was conducted using the standard first-past-the-post electoral method.

== Background ==
The election saw Michael Fowler returned as mayor for a third term as well as the introduction of a third party to contest control of the council. The Rates Reform ticket debuted to challenge the long established council duopoly between the Labour and Citizens' tickets. Founded in early 1979, the Rates Reform group accused local bodies of excessive spending and wanted a cessation to rates increases funded by cutting services and council staff. The group performed poorly however with all candidates receiving far fewer votes than the other tickets' candidates. By the following election the Rates Reform group had merged into the Citizens Association and two of their 1980 candidates (Ruth Gotlieb and Bryan Weyburne) were elected as councillors.

== Mayoralty results ==
1980 Wellington mayoral election
Party	Candidate	Votes	%	±%
Citizens'	Michael Fowler	17,964	51.63	+10.71
Labour	Ros Noonan	9,986	28.70	
Rates Reform	Bryan Weyburne	5,698	16.37	
Independent	Donald McPherson	335	0.96	
Independent Citizens'	Frank Moncur	279	0.80	
Independent	Victor Walter	265	0.76	
Independent	Margaret Barry-Gellen	263	0.75	
Majority		7,978	22.93	+15.68
Turnout		34,790	36.25	−10.63

== Councillor results ==
1980 Wellington City Council election
Party	Candidate	Votes	%	±%
Labour	Helene Ritchie	16,679	47.94	+9.83
Citizens'	Betty Campbell	16,432	47.23	−1.09
Citizens'	Ian Lawrence	16,411	47.17	−2.34
Labour	Ros Noonan	16,159	46.44	
Labour	Keith Spry	15,938	45.81	−2.53
Citizens'	Denis Foot	15,369	44.17	
Citizens'	Rosemary Young	14,822	42.60	−5.59
Labour	Tala Cleverley	14,327	41.18	+5.03
Citizens'	Gavin Wilson	14,302	41.10	+4.24
Labour	Frank O'Flynn	14,049	40.38	−4.07
Labour	Joe Aspell	13,862	39.84	−2.12
Citizens'	David Bull	13,691	39.35	+3.53
Citizens'	Bruce Harris	13,646	39.22	
Labour	Hazel Bibby	13,583	39.04	
Labour	Jenny Brough	13,205	37.95	−0.51
Citizens'	Roger Ridley-Smith	12,988	37.33	
Citizens'	Leone Harkness	12,954	37.23	
Citizens'	Les Paske	12,917	37.12	+3.11
Citizens'	Gary Turkington	12,577	36.15	
Labour	Neville Pickering	12,443	35.76	
Citizens'	Saul Goldsmith	11,846	34.05	+15.72
Labour	Tilly Hunter	11,735	33.73	−0.45
Citizens'	Audrey Fitzgerald	11,445	32.89	−14.20
Citizens'	Robin Lockie	11,147	32.04	
Citizens'	Lewis Guyson	10,914	31.37	
Labour	Pat Booth	10,853	31.19	
Citizens'	Nora Berry	10,166	29.22	
Labour	David Robinson	10,118	29.08	
Labour	Tony Burton	9,983	28.69	
Labour	Les Duckworth	9,957	28.62	
Citizens'	Michael Urquhart	9,918	28.50	
Citizens'	Richard Caughley	9,846	28.30	
Labour	Chris Dudfield	9,640	27.70	
Labour	Joe McTaggart	9,504	27.31	−3.96
Labour	David Butler	9,453	27.17	
Labour	Gerard Dobson	9,094	26.05	
Rates Reform	Brett Ambler	8,441	24.26	
Rates Reform	Ruth Gotlieb	6,750	19.40	
Rates Reform	Ron England	6,468	18.59	+11.73
Rates Reform	Eric Elliott	5,897	16.95	
Rates Reform	Gavin Munro Wilson	5,278	15.17	
Rates Reform	Desmond Briggs	5,213	14.98	
Rates Reform	Bruce Paton	4,970	14.28	
Rates Reform	Ivan Solt	4,923	14.15	−7.60
Rates Reform	Michael Gibson	4,903	14.09	
Rates Reform	Ida Rose	4,902	14.08	
Independent	Suzy Van-Der-Kwast	4,863	13.97	
Rates Reform	Brian Wheeler	4,713	13.54	
Rates Reform	Paul Douche	4,643	13.34	
Rates Reform	David Preston	4,520	12.99	
Rates Reform	Jack Schaef	4,467	12.83	
Rates Reform	James Green	4,313	12.39	
Rates Reform	Mark Endacott	4,293	12.33	
Independent Labour	John Ulrich	3,200	9.19	
Independent	Donald McPherson	2,572	7.39	
Independent Citizens'	Frank Moncur	2,009	5.77	+0.45
Independent Citizens'	Bart Greaves	1,935	5.56	
Independent	David Mitchell	1,871	5.37	−1.74
Independent	William Dalgliesh	1,228	3.52	
