= 1910 Wellington mayoral election =

New Zealand local election

- 28 April 1910
- Turnout: 11,515 (35.87%)
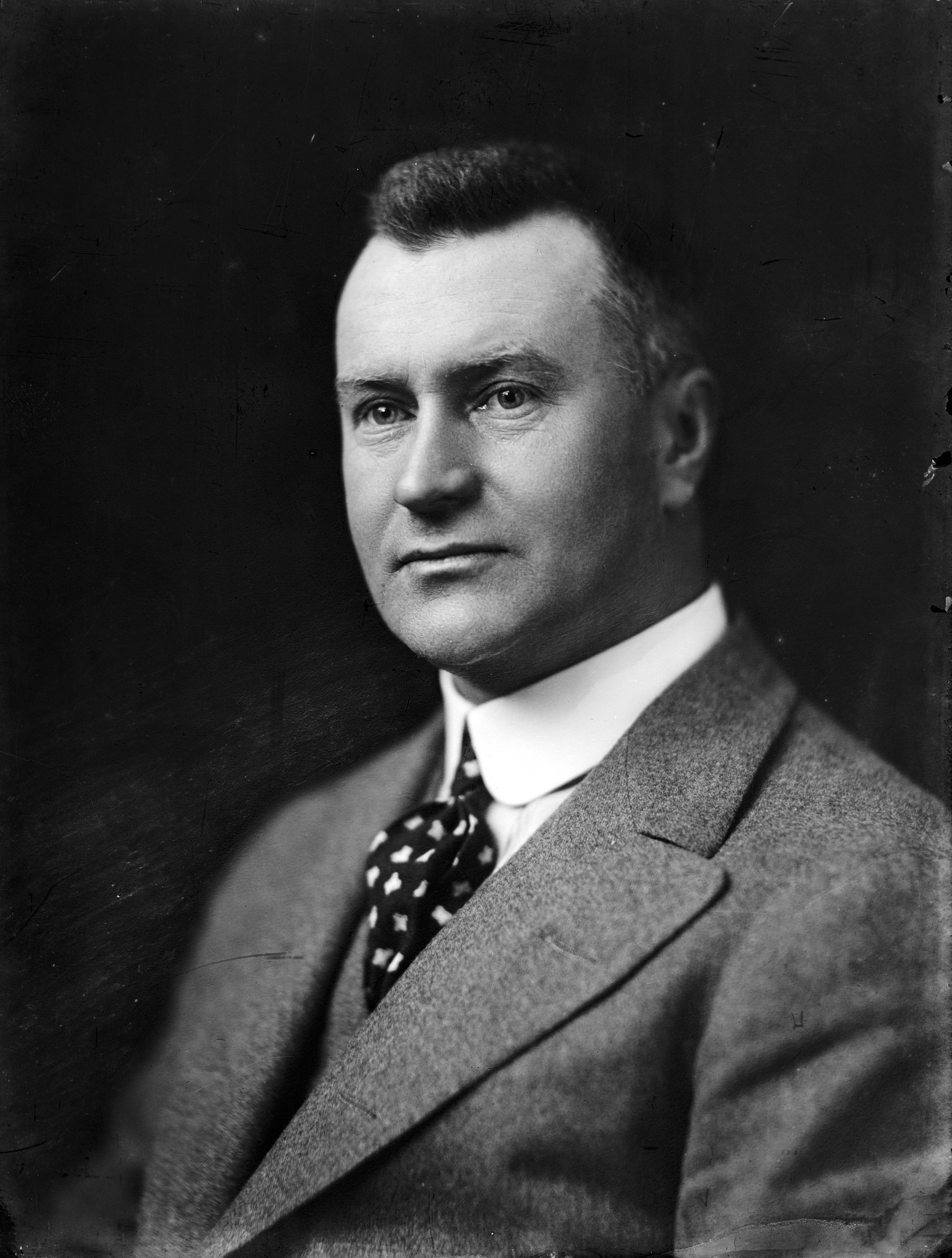

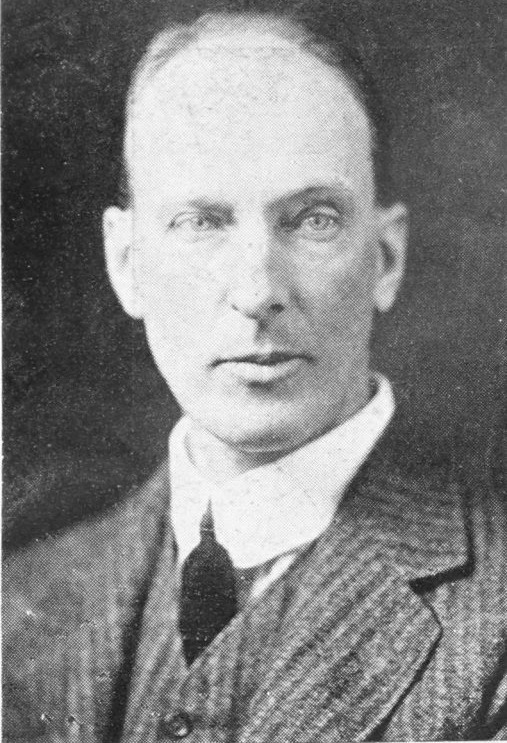
Candidate	Thomas Wilford	Charles John Crawford
Party	Citizens League	Independent
Popular vote	6,248	5,267
Percentage	54.26	45.74
Mayor before election
Alfred Newman
Elected mayor
Thomas Wilford

The 1910 Wellington mayoral election was held to determine the next Mayor of Wellington. The polling was conducted using the standard first-past-the-post electoral method.

== Background ==
The incumbent Mayor, Alfred Newman did not stand for re-election. At this time Wellington held their council elections biennially and the Mayoralty was annually. Thomas Wilford was elected to office as the new Mayor of Wellington, after four unsuccessful attempts prior, beating his sole opponent Charles John Crawford.

The 1910 local elections were the first in which residents as well as ratepayers were eligible to vote.

== Mayoralty results ==
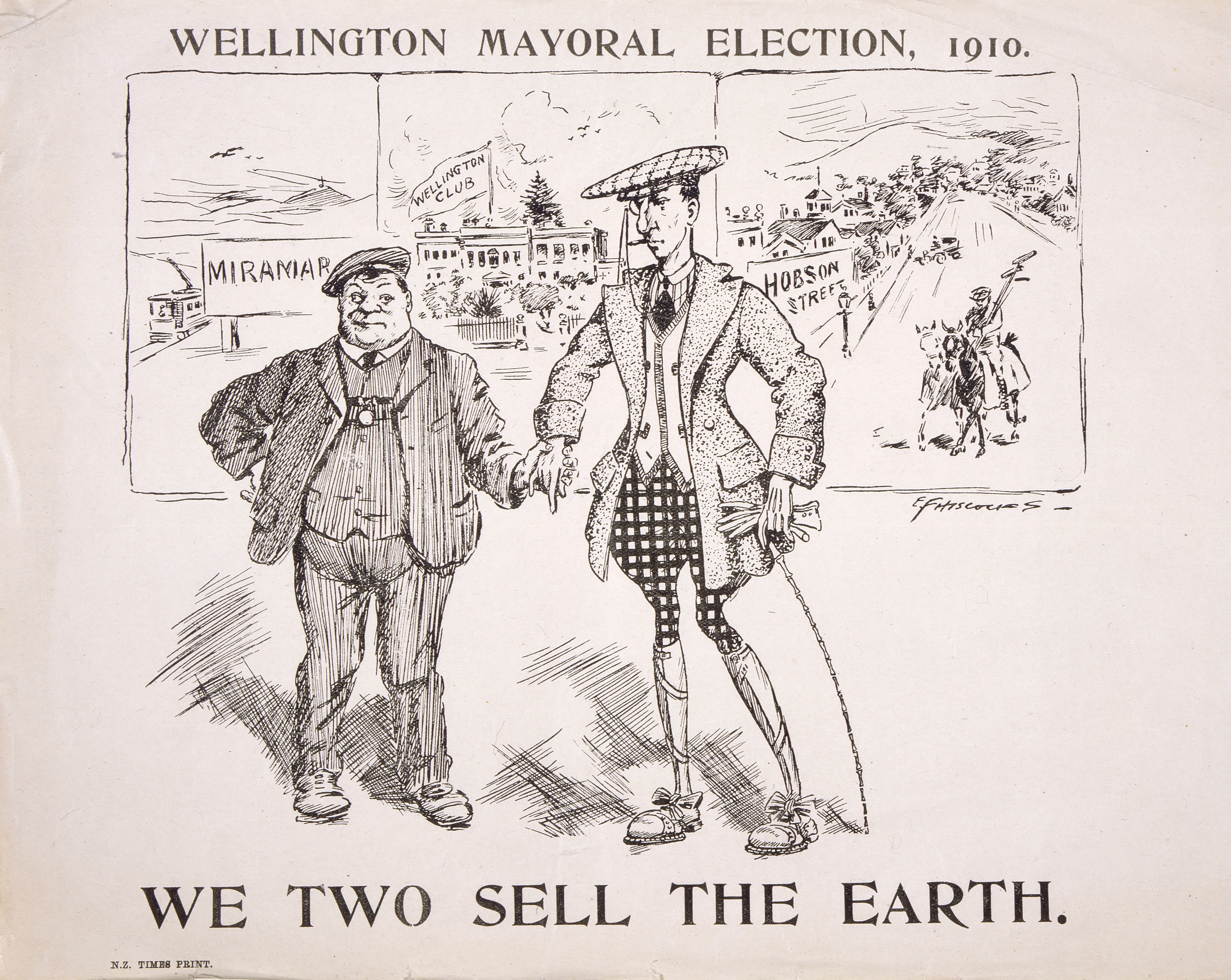
Cartoon of the mayoral race

The following table gives the election results:

1910 Wellington mayoral election
Party	Candidate	Votes	%	±%
Citizens League	Thomas Wilford	6,248	54.26	+22.75
Independent	Charles John Crawford	5,267	45.74	
Majority		981	8.51	
Turnout		11,515	35.87	−8.61
