= 1911 Wellington mayoral election =

New Zealand local election

- 20 April 1911
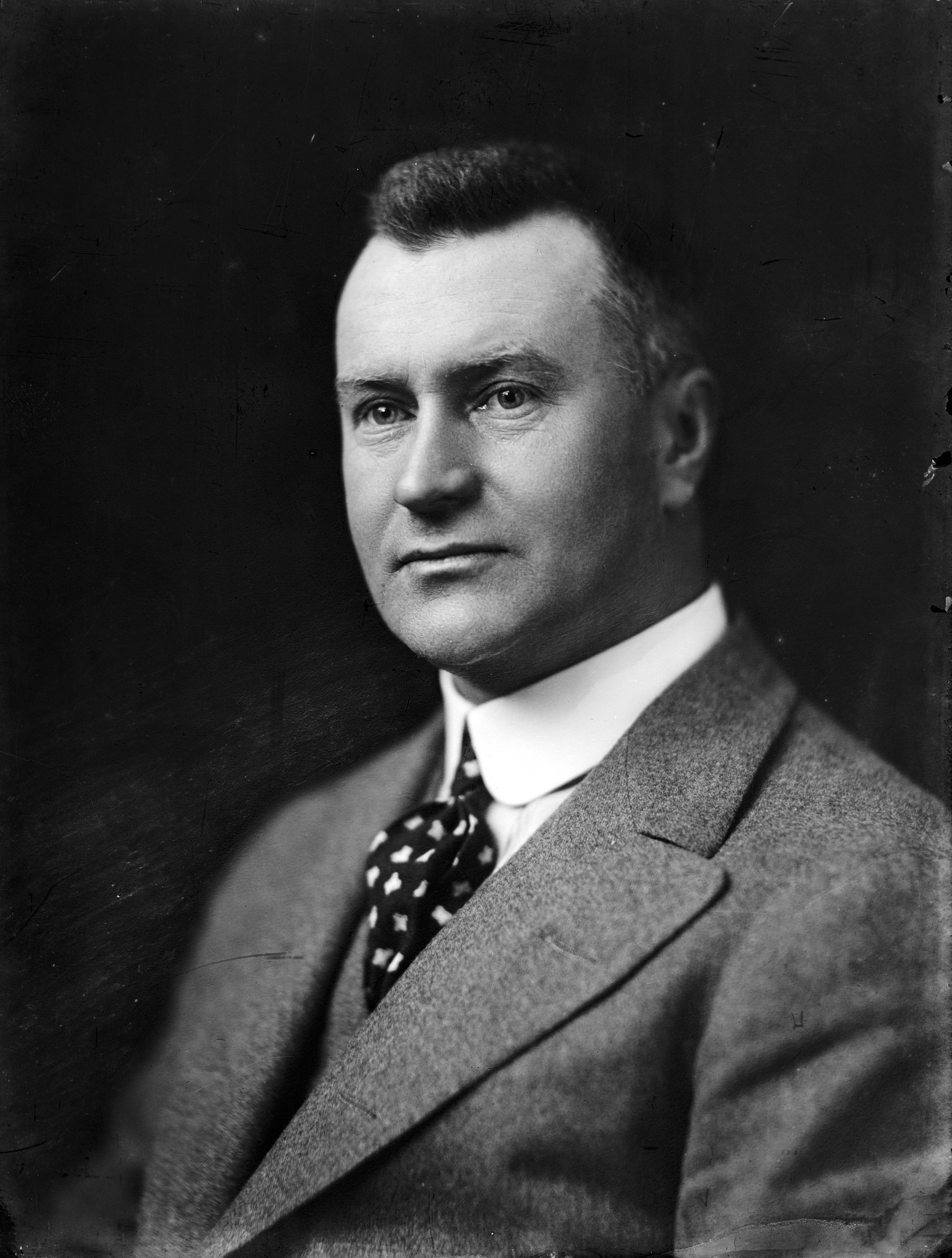
Candidate	Thomas Wilford
Party	Citizens League
Popular vote	elected unopposed
Mayor before election
Thomas Wilford
Elected mayor
Thomas Wilford

The 1911 Wellington mayoral election was part of the New Zealand local elections held that same year. In 1911, elections were held for the Mayor of Wellington plus other local government positions including fifteen city councillors, also elected biannually. Thomas Wilford, the incumbent Mayor sought re-election and retained office unopposed with no other candidates emerging. The polling was conducted using the standard first-past-the-post electoral method.

== Councillor results ==
1911 Wellington City Council election
Party	Candidate	Votes	%	±%
Citizens League	Robert Fletcher	10,900	71.17	−13.46
Citizens League	William Barber	9,298	60.71	
Labour	Alfred Hindmarsh	8,037	52.48	−3.46
Citizens League	John Fitzgerald	8,000	52.23	−1.79
Labour	David McLaren	7,788	50.85	−20.11
Citizens League	Falk Cohen	7,711	50.35	−17.21
Citizens League	George Shirtcliffe	7,291	47.61	−19.68
Citizens League	Arthur Atkinson	7,272	47.48	−21.00
Citizens League	John Smith	7,057	46.08	
Independent	John Fuller Jr.	6,955	45.41	
Citizens League	James Godber	6,378	41.64	
Citizens League	James Trevor	6,301	41.14	−12.91
Independent	Len McKenzie	6,247	40.79	+0.02
Citizens League	George Frost	6,198	40.47	−6.91
Independent	Robert Cameron	6,113	39.91	
Citizens League	William Bennett	5,483	35.80	−4.82
Citizens League	William Thompson	5,346	34.90	
Labour	Elijah Carey	4,939	32.25	+10.02
Labour	Michael Reardon	4,926	32.16	+9.52
Labour	Thomas Smith	4,832	31.55	
Citizens League	Arthur Hunt	4,766	31.12	
Independent	John Castle	4,439	28.98	
Labour	Bill Jordan	4,227	27.60	
Citizens League	Stanislaus Moran	4,080	26.64	
Labour	George Reyling	3,968	25.91	
Independent	Joseph Mandel	3,813	24.89	
Labour	Ivor Hazell	3,808	24.86	
Independent	Walter Bedford	2,800	18.28	
Citizens League	Edwin Gallichan	2,683	17.51	
Independent	Charles McIntyre	2,223	14.51	
Independent	John Jenkinson	2,185	14.26	
Independent	Vilhelm Jensen	1,804	11.78	−1.82
Independent	Arthur Fullford	1,791	11.69	−21.81
Independent	Andrew Hornblow	1,637	10.68	
Independent	Henry Bodley	1,482	9.67	
Independent	Charles Thorpe	990	6.46	
