= 1986 Wellington City Council election =

Local election in New Zealand

- 11 October 1986
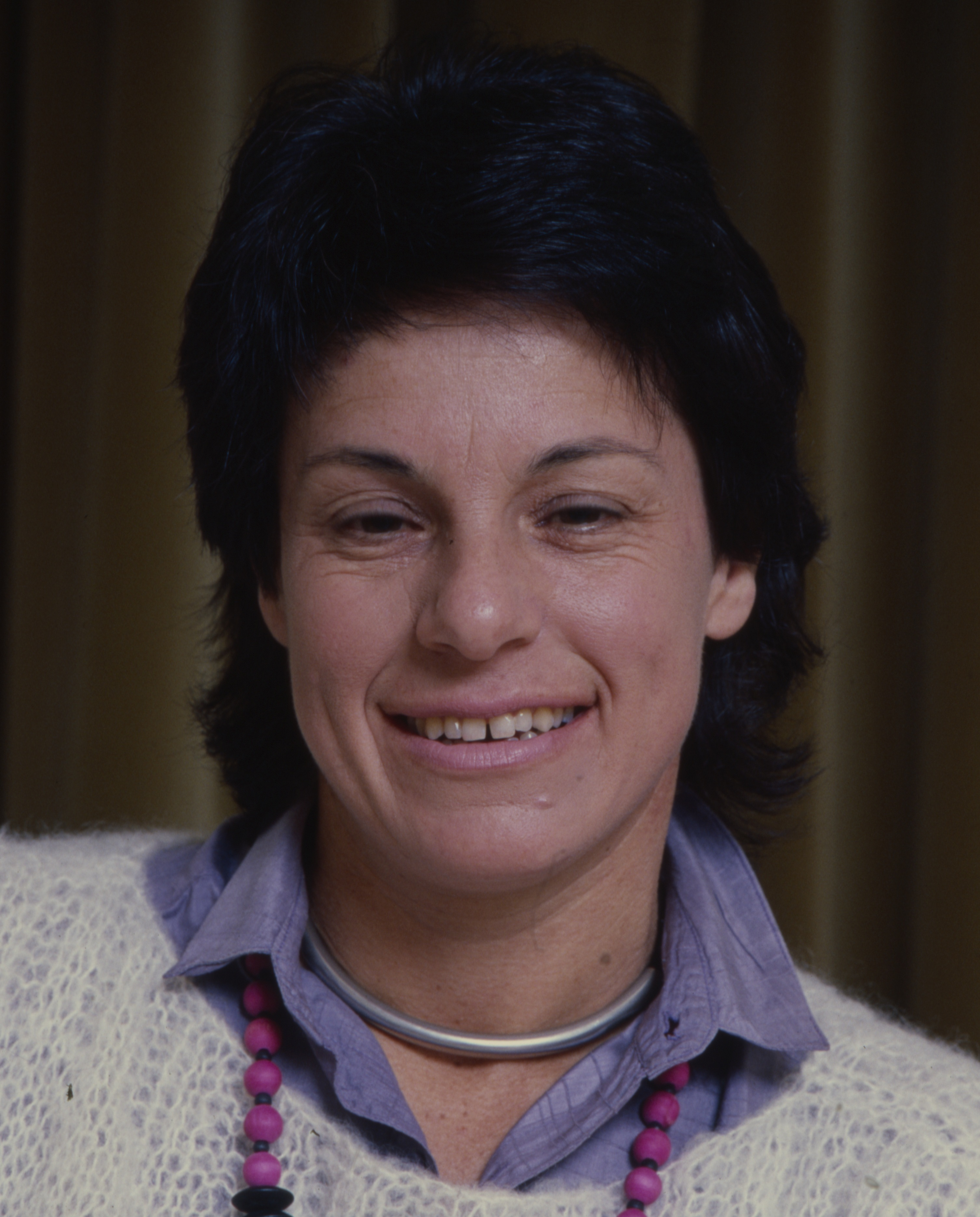

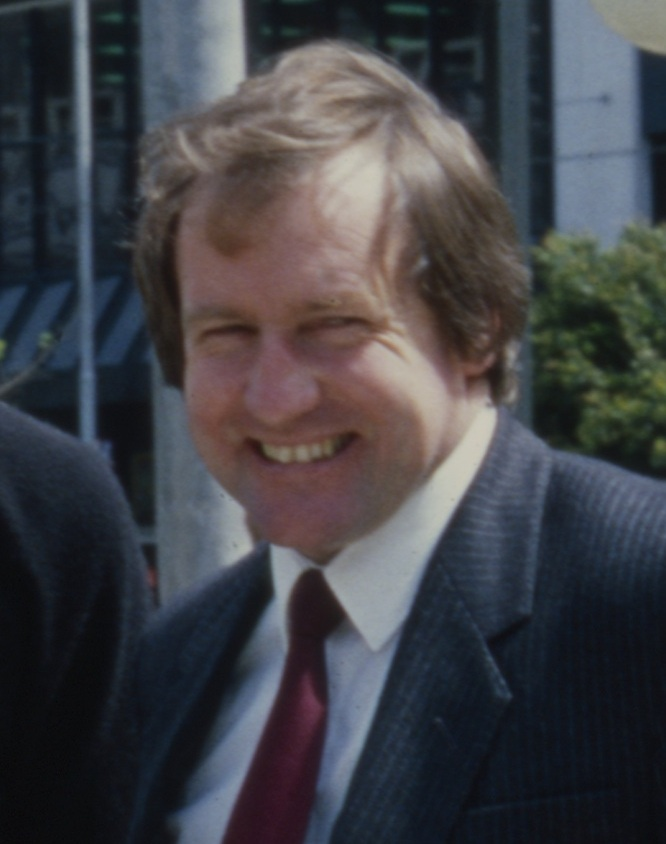
	First party	Second party
Leader	Helene Ritchie	Gavin Wilson
Party	Labour	Citizens'
Leader since	13 October 1980	13 October 1983
City Council	11 seats	9 seats
Harbour	3 seats	2 seats
Hospital	3 seats	3 seats
Regional	5 seats	3 seats
Total Seats	22 seats	17 seats
Seat Change	▲8	▼3
- Results by ward, shaded by highest polling party

The 1986 Wellington City Council election was part of the 1986 New Zealand local elections, to elect members to sub-national councils and boards. The polling was conducted using the first-past-the-post electoral method.

== Council ==
The Wellington City Council consists of a mayor and twenty-one councillors elected from seven wards (Brooklyn, Eastern, Karori, Lambton, Northern, Otari, Southern).

=== Mayor ===
1986 Wellington mayoral election
Party	Candidate	Votes	%	±%
Labour	Jim Belich	18,873	50.58	
Citizens'	Ian Lawrence	16,519	44.27	−4.97
Independent	Norm Thomas	1,344	3.60	
McGillicuddy Serious	Mark Servian	260	0.69	
Private Enterprise	Frank Moncur	251	0.67	+0.27
Informal votes		294	0.78	+0.16
Majority		2,354	6.30	
Turnout		37,017	41.77	+4.18
Registered electors		89,328		

==== Brooklyn Ward ====
The Brooklyn Ward elects two members to the Wellington City Council

Brooklyn Ward
Party	Candidate	Votes	%	±%
Labour	Helene Ritchie	2,369	68.34	
Labour	John Blincoe	2,044	58.97	
Citizens'	Ian Bartram	1,062	30.64	
Citizens'	Paul Douche	697	20.10	
Independent Citizens'	Saul Goldsmith	544	15.69	
Independent	Bill Maung	162	4.67	
Informal votes		55	1.58	
Turnout		3,466	38.69	
Registered electors		8,957		

==== Eastern Ward ====
The Eastern Ward elects four members to the Wellington City Council

Eastern Ward
Party	Candidate	Votes	%	±%
Citizens'	Ruth Gotlieb	3,226	50.21	
Citizens'	Les Paske	3,025	47.08	
Labour	Nic Dalton	2,904	45.20	
Labour	Geoff Turner	2,796	43.52	
Labour	Lloyd Brown	2,543	39.58	
Citizens'	Kevin Allen	2,526	39.32	
Labour	Allan Jenkins	2,436	37.92	
Citizens'	Cress Thirkell	1,964	30.57	
Independent	Jenny Harris	1,596	24.84	
Independent	Bruce Harris	1,385	21.55	
Independent	David Mitchell	816	12.70	
Private Enterprise	Frank Moncur	392	6.10	
Informal votes		87	1.35	
Turnout		6,425	39.37	
Registered electors		16,316		

==== Karori Ward ====
The Karori Ward elects two members to the Wellington City Council

Karori Ward
Party	Candidate	Votes	%	±%
Citizens'	Gavin Wilson	2,281	54.40	
Independent	Val Bedingfield	2,177	51.91	
Citizens'	Bryan Weyburne	1,947	46.43	
Labour	Tracey Crampton-Smith	1,021	24.35	
Labour	David Davies	915	21.82	
Informal votes		45	1.07	
Turnout		4,193	47.67	
Registered electors		8,795		

==== Lambton Ward ====
The Lambton Ward elects three members to the Wellington City Council

Lambton Ward
Party	Candidate	Votes	%	±%
Labour	Margaret Bonner	2,346	50.50	
Labour	Terry McDavitt	2,248	48.39	
Citizens'	Rex Nicholls	2,147	46.22	
Labour	Myra Giese	1,879	40.45	
Independent Labour	Joe Aspell	1,760	37.89	
Citizens'	William Brien	1,548	33.32	
Citizens'	John Wedde	1,501	32.31	
Independent	George Crombie	413	8.89	
Informal votes		95	2.04	
Turnout		4,645	36.71	
Registered electors		12,651		

==== Northern Ward ====
The Northern Ward elects three members to the Wellington City Council

Northern Ward
Party	Candidate	Votes	%	±%
Citizens'	David Bull	2,223	51.43	
Citizens'	Sarah Lysaght	2,175	50.32	
Labour	Ken Boyden	1,947	45.04	
Labour	Pip Piper	1,833	42.41	
Labour	Jan Gould	1,728	39.98	
Citizens'	Stephen Bourne	1,626	37.62	
Independent	Norm Thomas	1,349	31.21	
Informal votes		86	1.98	
Turnout		4,322	32.71	
Registered electors		13,210		

==== Otari Ward ====
The Otari Ward elects four members to the Wellington City Council

Otari Ward
Party	Candidate	Votes	%	±%
Labour	Jim Belich (Note: As Belich won the Mayoralty his election to the council was voided and his seat was awarded to the highest polling unsuccessful candidate.)	5,023	65.68	
Citizens'	Rosemary Young-Rouse	4,373	57.18	
Citizens'	Sally Baber	4,025	52.63	
Labour	Sue Driver	3,898	50.97	
Citizens'	Anna Weir	3,575	46.75	
Citizens'	Arthur Kinsella	3,540	46.29	
Labour	Harold Dixon	3,296	43.10	
Labour	Henk Huber	2,744	35.88	
Informal votes		115	1.50	
Turnout		7,647	44.03	
Registered electors		17,364		

Table footnotes:

==== Southern Ward ====
The Southern Ward elects three members to the Wellington City Council

Southern Ward
Party	Candidate	Votes	%	±%
Labour	John Gilberthorpe	2,792	68.38	
Labour	Neville Taylor	2,706	66.27	
Labour	Tala Cleverley	2,588	63.38	
Citizens'	Kevin O'Brien	1,601	39.21	
Citizens'	Rama Ramanathan	1,367	33.48	
Citizens'	Lagi Sipeli	1,095	26.81	
Informal votes		100	2.44	
Turnout		4,083	33.92	
Registered electors		12,035		

== Other local elections ==
=== Wellington Harbour Board ===
Wellington Harbour Board
Party	Candidate	Votes	%	±%
Labour	Jim Belich	21,702	67.12	
Labour	Keith Spry	20,670	63.92	+6.46
Labour	Hazel Bibby	19,471	60.22	+8.64
Citizens'	Ruth Gotlieb	17,547	54.26	
Citizens'	Brian Barraclough	14,564	45.04	−8.32
Citizens'	Alister Macalister	14,478	44.77	−5.08
Labour	David Wilkin	13,833	42.78	
Citizens'	Kevin O'Brien	13,460	41.62	
Labour	Terry O'Brien	13,118	40.57	
Citizens'	James Stewart	12,915	39.94	
Informal votes		689	2.13	−1.52
Turnout		32,489	36.37	+3.94
Registered electors		89,328		

=== Wellington Hospital Board ===
Wellington Hospital Board
Party	Candidate	Votes	%	±%
Labour	Margaret Bonner	24,040	67.98	+16.45
Citizens'	Bridget-Anne Fowler	17,894	50.60	
Citizens'	Doug Catley	17,397	49.20	+2.99
Citizens'	Ella McLeod	17,283	48.87	+6.12
Labour	Val Taylor	17,160	48.53	
Labour	Anne Town	16,391	46.35	
Citizens'	Malcolm Nicholson	15,890	44.93	+3.19
Labour	Tracey Crampton-Smith	15,219	43.04	
Citizens'	Ralph Johnson	14,647	41.42	
Labour	John Morgan	14,611	41.32	
Labour	Henk Huber	13,659	38.62	+14.66
Informal votes		960	2.71	+0.61
Turnout		35,359	39.58	+6.05
Registered electors		89,328		

=== Wellington Regional Council ===
Wellington Regional Council
Party	Candidate	Votes	%	±%
Labour	Jim Belich	23,096	61.68	
Labour	Keith Spry	21,750	58.09	−6.09
Labour	Hazel Bibby	21,097	56.35	+1.02
Labour	Ken Boyden	16,561	44.23	+4.19
Citizens'	Les Paske	16,292	43.51	−17.92
Labour	Raewyn Good	15,956	42.61	
Citizens'	Mike Gibson	15,145	40.45	−9.67
Citizens'	Sarah Lysaght	14,706	39.27	
Citizens'	Kevin O'Brien	14,333	38.28	
Labour	Paul Swain	14,289	38.16	
Citizens'	Bob Moodie	14,189	37.89	
Citizens'	Lloyd Brown	13,773	36.78	
Labour	John Gilberthorpe	12,339	32.95	
Citizens'	Rama Ramanathan	11,486	30.67	
Citizens'	Paul Douche	10,871	29.03	
Independent	Saul Goldsmith	9,560	25.53	
Independent	Ron England	4,421	11.80	
Informal votes		486	1.29	−2.38
Turnout		37,439	41.91	+9.31
Registered electors		89,328		
