= 1989 Wellington City Council election =

Local election in New Zealand

- 14 October 1989
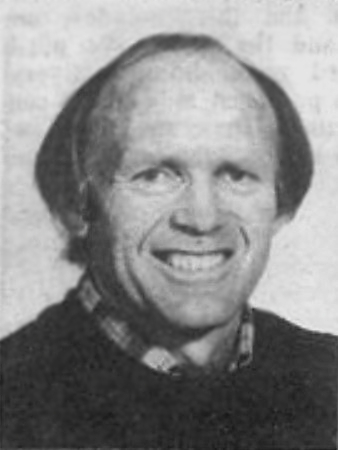

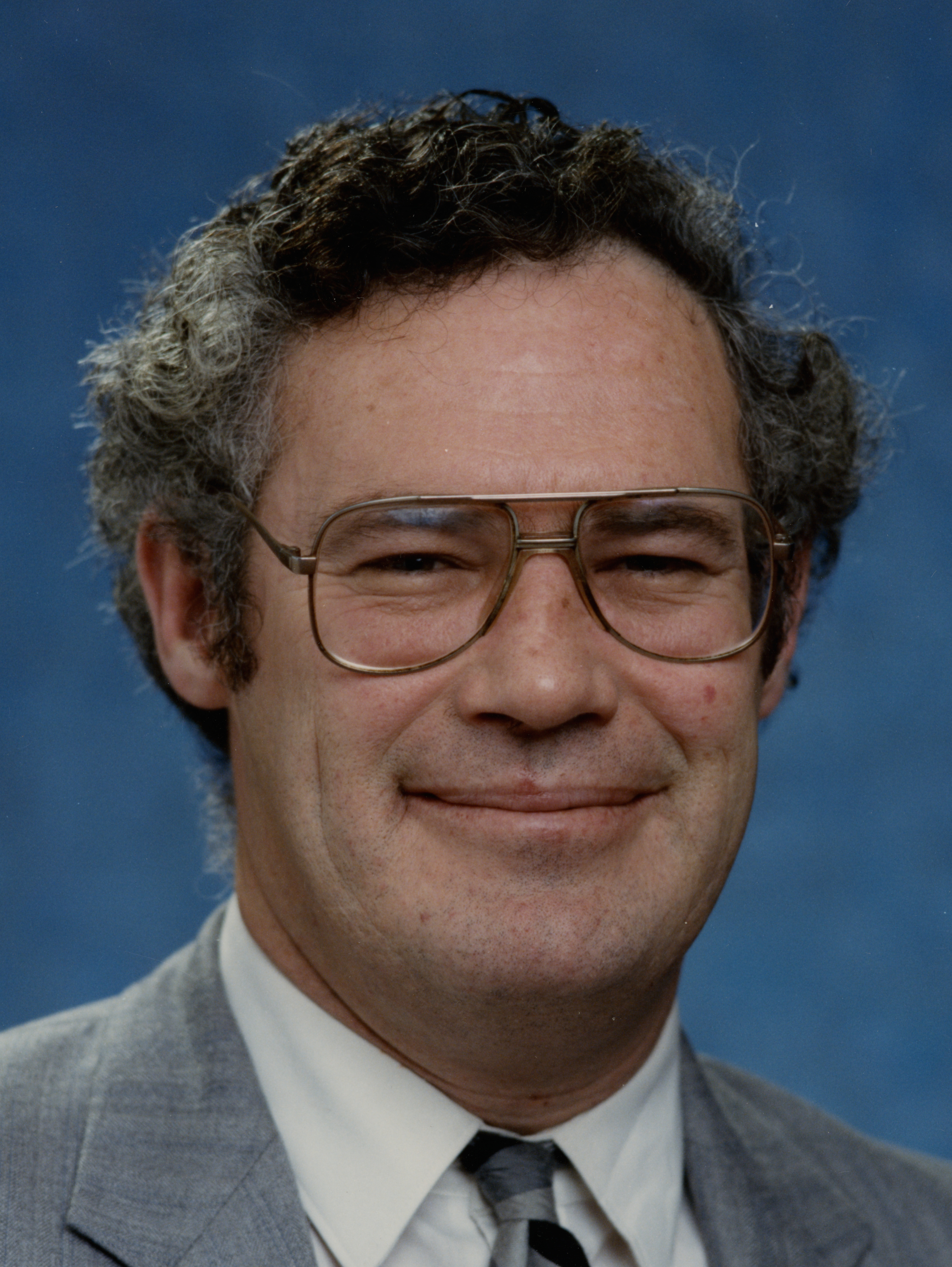

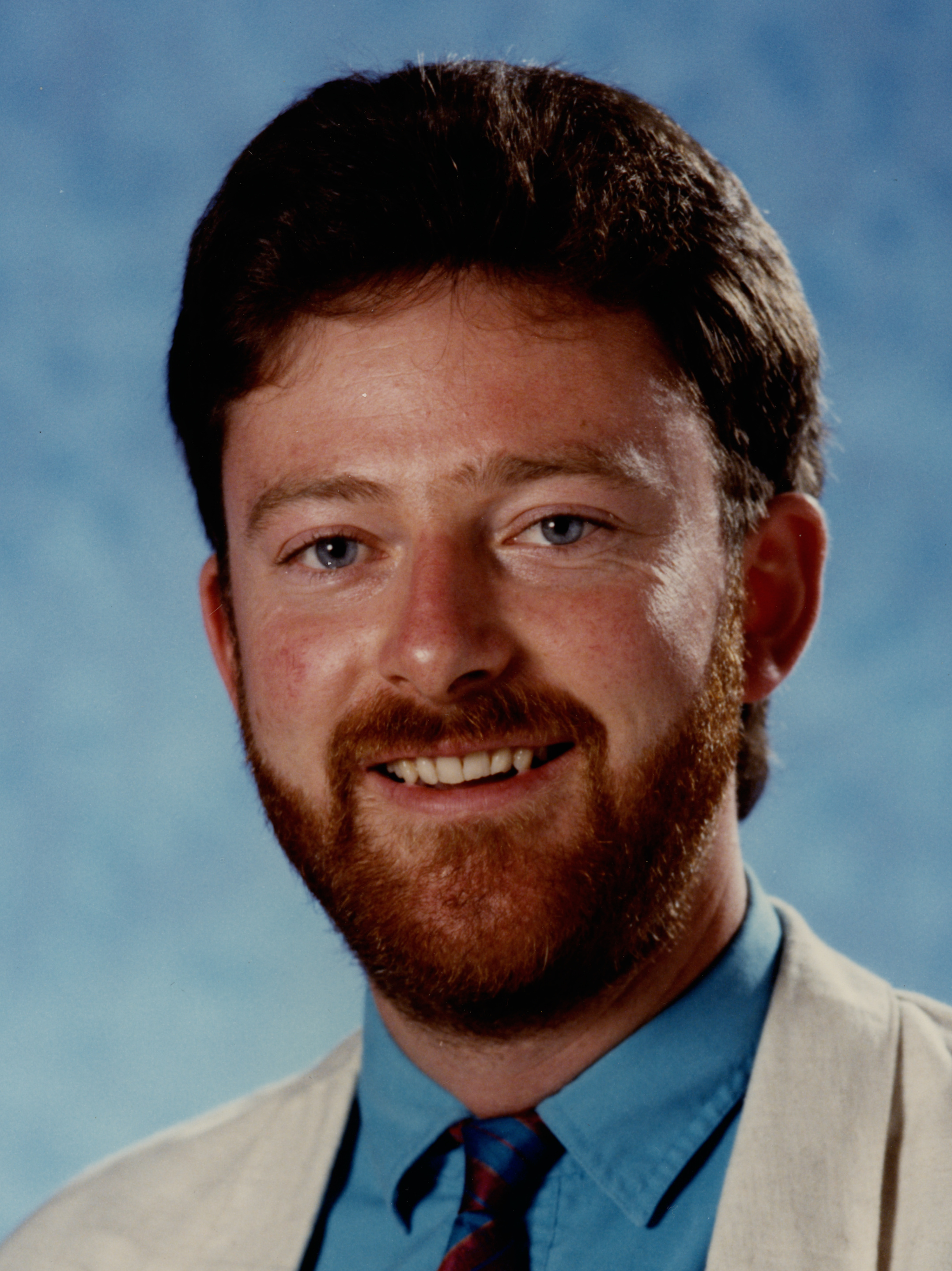
	First party	Second party	Third party
Leader	Rex Nicholls	Terry McDavitt	Stephen Rainbow
Party	Citizens'	Labour	Green
Leader since	30 May 1989	13 April 1988	June 1989
City Council	9 seats	8 seats	1 seat
Regional	4 seats	1 seat	0 seats
Hospital	2 seats	2 seats	0 seats
Total Seats	15 seats	11 seats	1 seat
Seat Change	▼2	▼11	▲1
- Results by ward, shaded by highest polling party/candidate vote share

The 1989 Wellington City Council election was part of the 1989 New Zealand local elections, to elect members to sub-national councils and boards. The polling was conducted using the first-past-the-post electoral method.

== Council ==
The Wellington City Council consists of a mayor and twenty-one councillors elected from seven wards (Eastern, Lambton, Northern, Onslow, Southern, Tawa, Western).

=== Mayor ===
1989 Wellington mayoral election
Party	Candidate	Votes	%	±%
Labour	Jim Belich	15,198	28.90	−21.68
Independent	Helene Ritchie	14,266	27.12	
Citizens'	Rex Nicholls	14,183	26.97	
Independent Citizens'	David Bull	4,372	8.31	
Independent	Roger Ridley-Smith	1,963	3.73	
McGillicuddy Serious	John Morrison	1,015	1.93	
Private Enterprise	Frank Moncur	200	0.38	−0.29
Informal votes		1,391	2.64	−1.86
Majority		932	1.77	−4.53
Turnout		52,588	49.94	+8.17
Registered electors		105,302		

=== Eastern Ward ===
The Eastern Ward returns four councillors to the Wellington City Council. The final results for the ward were:

Eastern Ward
Party	Candidate	Votes	%	±%
Citizens'	Ruth Gotlieb	6,308	63.51	+13.30
Citizens'	Les Paske	5,394	54.30	+7.22
Labour	Nic Dalton	5,200	52.35	+7.15
Citizens'	Brian Barraclough	4,197	42.25	
Citizens'	Rama Ramanathan	3,713	37.38	
Labour	Marie Bell	3,679	37.04	
Labour	Geoff Turner	3,267	32.89	−12.63
Labour	Rob Calder	2,731	27.49	
Green	Richard Aldridge	2,554	25.71	
Independent	Keith Richardson	2,096	21.10	
Private Enterprise	Frank Moncur	418	4.20	−1.90
Informal votes		172	1.73	+0.38
Turnout		9,932	46.85	+7.48
Registered electors		21,199		

=== Lambton Ward ===
The Lambton Ward returns three councillors to the Wellington City Council. The final results for the ward were:

Lambton Ward
Party	Candidate	Votes	%	±%
Citizens'	Russell Armitage	2,371	42.85	
Green	Stephen Rainbow	2,326	42.04	
Labour	Terry McDavitt	2,280	41.21	−7.18
Labour	Margaret Bonner	2,226	40.23	−10.27
Green	Rachell Barrett	2,099	37.94	
Citizens'	James Coyle	1,889	34.14	
Citizens'	Roly Metge	1,865	33.71	
Labour	Paul Harris	1,370	24.76	
Informal votes		170	3.07	+1.03
Turnout		5,533	39.29	+2.58
Registered electors		14,081		

=== Northern Ward ===
The Northern Ward returns three councillors to the Wellington City Council. The final results for the ward were:

Northern Ward
Party	Candidate	Votes	%	±%
Citizens'	Sarah Lysaght	4,018	62.58	−12.26
Labour	Ken Boyden	2,969	46.24	+1.20
Independent	Ian Hutchings	2,351	36.61	
Labour	Pip Piper	2,002	31.18	−11.23
Citizens'	Stephen Bourne	1,873	29.17	−8.45
Labour	Peter Graham	1,731	26.96	
Independent	Norm Thomas	1,724	26.85	−4.36
Citizens'	Vic Jarvis	1,486	23.14	
Independent	Kevin Rowell	850	13.23	
Informal votes		257	4.00	+2.02
Turnout		6,420	44.86	+12.15
Registered electors		14,310		

=== Onslow Ward ===
The Onslow Ward returns two councillors to the Wellington City Council. The final results for the ward were:

Onslow Ward
Party	Candidate	Votes	%	±%
Citizens'	Sally Baber	3,518	64.66	
Citizens'	Les Stephens	3,038	55.84	
Labour	Diane Jonassen	1,520	27.94	
Independent	Bob Monks	1,391	25.56	
Labour	Carl Dawson	1,203	22.11	
Informal votes		210	3.86	
Turnout		5,440	52.36	
Registered electors		10,389		

=== Southern Ward ===
The Southern Ward returns four councillors to the Wellington City Council. The final results for the ward were:

Southern Ward
Party	Candidate	Votes	%	±%
Labour	John Blincoe	4,199	51.26	
Labour	John Gilberthorpe	4,068	49.67	−18.71
Labour	Tala Cleverley	3,812	46.54	−16.84
Citizens'	Merrin Downing	3,151	38.47	
Labour	Rodney Murphy	2,930	35.77	−1.02
Green	Michael Murray	2,358	28.79	
Citizens'	Ivan Brody-Solt	2,185	26.67	
Citizens'	Lagi Sipeli	2,105	25.70	−1.11
Citizens'	Asalemo Pesamino	1,557	19.01	
People's Party	Warwick Taylor	1,396	17.04	−1.42
Independent	Bill Maung	1,083	13.22	
Independent	Owen Henderson	1,044	12.74	+3.16
People's Party	Christopher Ellis	842	10.28	
People's Party	Michael Day	748	9.13	
People's Party	Gerard Worsfold	635	7.75	
Independent	Ralph Burton	353	4.31	
Informal votes		294	3.58	+1.18
Turnout		8,191	39.48	+5.56
Registered electors		20,743		

=== Tawa Ward ===
The Tawa Ward returns two councillors to the Wellington City Council. The final results for the ward were:

Tawa Ward
Party	Candidate	Votes	%	±%
Independent	David Watt	3,267	71.34	
Independent	Kerry Prendergast	2,401	52.43	
Independent	Graeme Sutton	2,283	49.85	
Independent	Robert Banks	746	16.29	
Independent	Ron England	387	8.45	
Informal votes		74	1.61	
Turnout		4,579	53.27	
Registered electors		8,595		

=== Western Ward ===
The Western Ward returns three councillors to the Wellington City Council. The final results for the ward were:

Western Ward
Party	Candidate	Votes	%	±%
Independent	Val Bedingfield	5,362	67.31	
Citizens'	Anna Weir	4,283	53.77	
Labour	Sue Driver	4,201	52.74	
Citizens'	Colin Robertson	2,776	34.85	
Citizens'	Peter Gapes	2,571	32.27	
Green	Chris Thomas	2,475	31.07	
Labour	Jim Kebbell	1,569	19.69	
Independent	Bruce Abernethy	508	6.37	
Informal votes		150	1.88	
Turnout		7,965	50.99	
Registered electors		15,618		

== Other local elections ==
=== Wellington Regional Council ===
==== Wellington North Ward ====
The Wellington North Ward returns three councillors to the Wellington Regional Council.

North Ward
Party	Candidate	Votes	%	±%
Independent	Helene Ritchie	10,457	44.13	
Independent	David Bull	10,039	42.36	
Citizens'	Jim Rowe	7,064	29.81	
Labour	Ken Boyden	7,049	29.74	−14.49
Citizens'	Mike Gibson	6,937	29.27	−11.18
Independent	Hazel Bibby	6,932	29.25	−27.10
Citizens'	Dennis Duggan	5,801	24.48	
Green	Chris Thomas	5,236	22.09	
Labour	Matthew Bennett	3,606	15.21	
Labour	Dave Davies	2,985	12.59	
Independent	Kevin Rowell	1,900	8.01	
Green	Ivor Farkash	1,820	7.68	
Informal votes		1,259	5.31	
Turnout		23,695	48.44	
Registered electors		48,912		

==== South Ward ====
The Wellington South Ward returns four councillors to the Wellington Regional Council.

Wellington South Ward
Party	Candidate	Votes	%	±%
Citizens'	Ruth Gotlieb	13,002	56.22	
Citizens'	Ian Lawrence	12,541	54.22	
Citizens'	Les Paske	10,538	45.56	+2.05
Labour	Terry McDavitt	9,282	40.13	
Labour	Val Taylor	8,942	38.66	
Labour	Raewyn Good	8,521	36.84	−5.77
Citizens'	Kevin O'Brien	8,231	35.59	−2.69
Labour	John Gilberthorpe	7,535	32.58	−0.37
Green	Stephen Rainbow	7,119	30.78	
Green	John Carter	5,803	25.09	
Informal votes		997	4.31	
Turnout		23,125	41.27	
Registered electors		56,023		

=== Wellington Area Health Board ===
==== North Ward ====
The Wellington North Ward returns two members to the Wellington Area Health Board.

Wellington North Ward
Party	Candidate	Votes	%	±%
Citizens'	Bridget-Anne Fowler	10,261	42.63	
Labour	Margaret Bonner	9,900	41.13	
Citizens'	Doug Catley	9,320	38.72	
Independent	Barry McGuiness	5,756	23.91	
Independent	Jean Drage	5,252	21.82	
Labour	Jim Kebbell	4,513	18.75	
Independent	Boyd Pieres	1,125	4.67	
Informal votes		2,010	8.35	
Turnout		24,068	49.20	
Registered electors		48,912		

==== South Ward ====
The Wellington South Ward returns two members to the Wellington Area Health Board.

Wellington South Ward
Party	Candidate	Votes	%	±%
Citizens'	Glenys Arthur	12,599	52.30	
Labour	Val Taylor	10,650	44.21	
Citizens'	Ian Symonds	10,551	43.80	
Labour	Anne Town	9,476	39.33	
Independent	Roderick Walker	2,985	12.39	
Informal votes		1,917	7.95	
Turnout		24,089	42.99	
Registered electors		56,023		
