= 1947 Wellington mayoral election =

New Zealand local election

- 19 November 1947
- Turnout: 49,842 (50.63%)
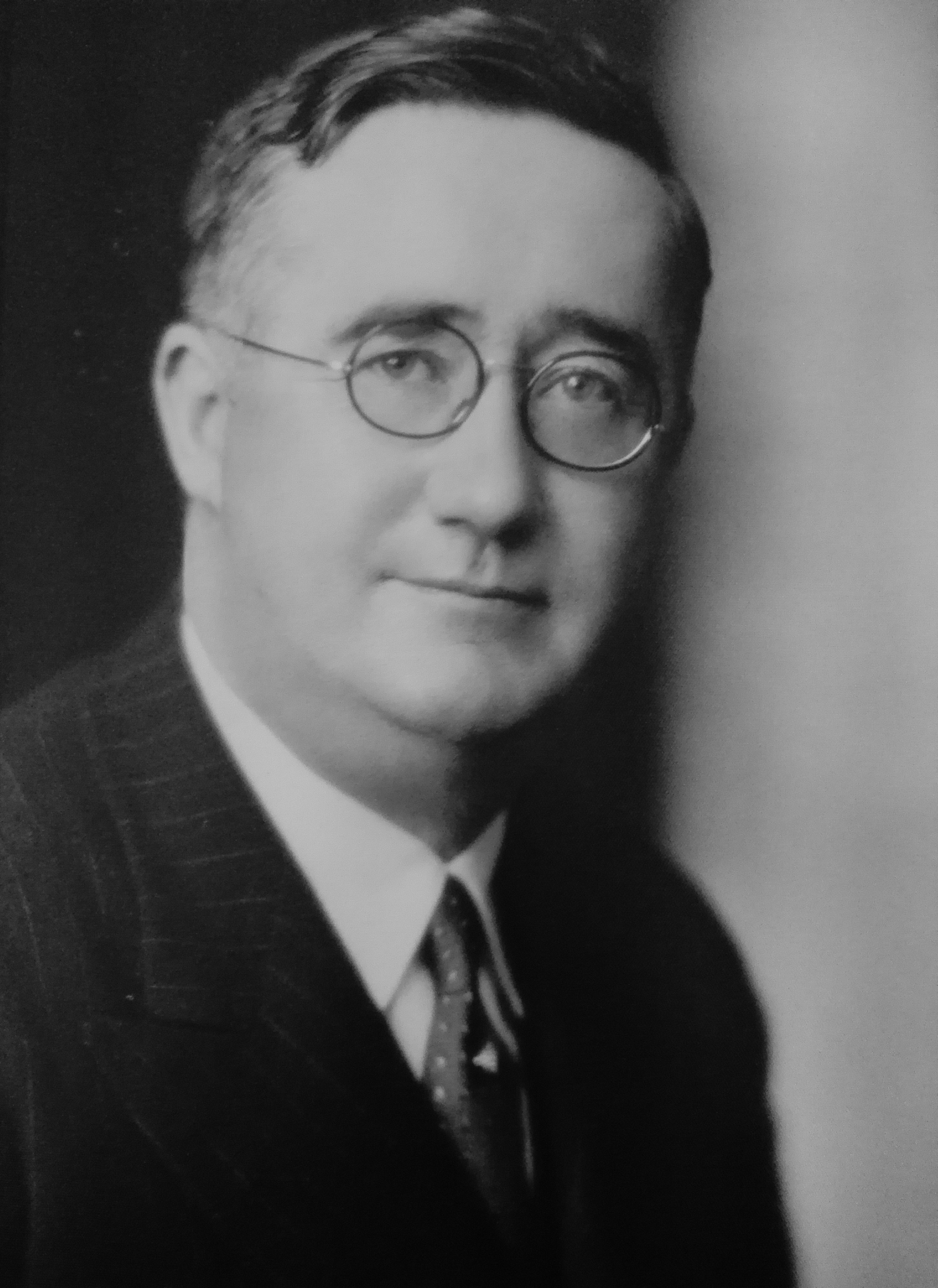

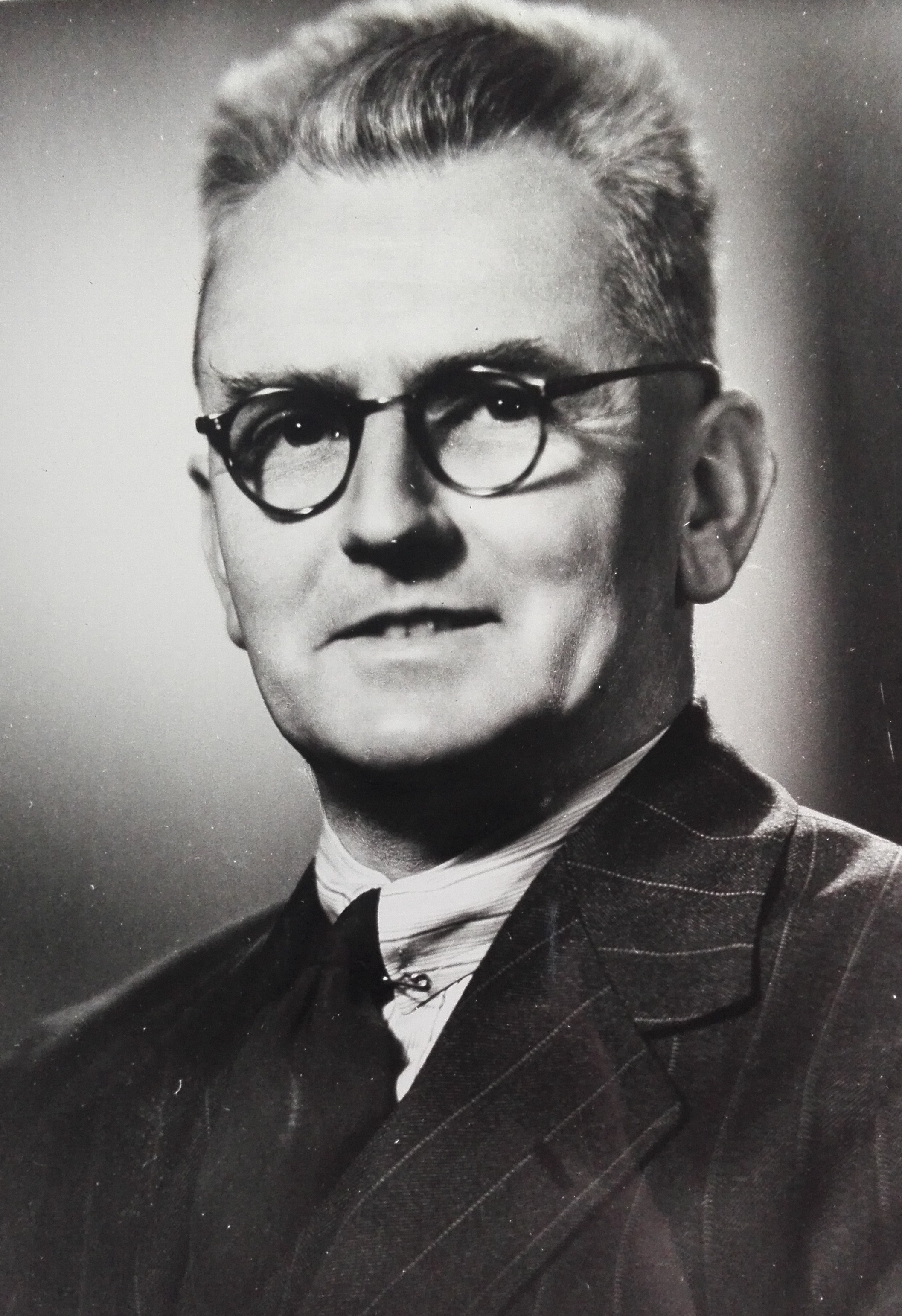
Candidate	Will Appleton	Nathan Seddon
Party	Citizens'	Labour
Popular vote	27,000	22,444
Percentage	54.17	45.04
Mayor before election
Will Appleton
Elected mayor
Will Appleton

The 1947 Wellington mayoral election was part of the New Zealand local elections held that same year. In 1947, election were held for the Mayor of Wellington plus other local government positions including fifteen city councillors. The polling was conducted using the standard first-past-the-post electoral method.

== Background ==
The Citizens' Association reselected the incumbent mayor Will Appleton after agreeing at a meeting to form a deputation to request he stand again. He had been mayor for three years and a councillor for thirteen years prior. He had been chairman of the works committee since 1933. All eleven Citizens' councillors who were not retiring were reselected.

The Labour Party almost decided not to contest the mayoralty. When the Wellington Labour Representation Committee met to discuss the municipal elections a motion to put up a mayoral candidate was carried by only thirty-seven votes to thirty-five. Ultimately it selected Newtown businessman Nathan Richard Seddon as its candidate. He was the Chairman of the Wellington Education Board and a grand nephew of Richard Seddon, a former Prime Minister of New Zealand.

== Mayoralty results ==
1947 Wellington mayoral election
Party	Candidate	Votes	%	±%
Citizens'	Will Appleton	27,000	54.17	−4.63
Labour	Nathan Seddon	22,444	45.04	
Informal votes		398	0.79	−0.42
Majority		4,556	9.14	−9.69
Turnout		49,842	50.63	−8.24

== Councillor results ==
1947 Wellington City Council election
Party	Candidate	Votes	%	±%
Citizens'	Elizabeth Gilmer	30,258	60.70	+1.34
Citizens'	Robert Macalister	27,455	55.08	+1.03
Citizens'	Charles Treadwell	27,361	54.89	
Citizens'	Frederick Furkert	25,947	52.05	−1.89
Citizens'	Malcolm Galloway	25,795	51.75	−1.28
Citizens'	Ernest Toop	25,764	51.69	+0.99
Citizens'	Len Jacobsen	25,743	51.64	+1.62
Citizens'	Stewart Hardy	25,604	51.37	
Citizens'	Sandy Pope	25,386	50.93	+1.02
Citizens'	Harry Nankervis	24,979	50.11	
Citizens'	William Stevens	24,782	49.72	+1.51
Citizens'	Denis McGrath	24,477	49.10	
Citizens'	Archibald Richardson	23,438	47.02	
Citizens'	William Birthwhistle	23,256	46.65	
Citizens'	Jack Living	22,960	46.06	
Labour	Eugene Casey	20,521	41.17	
Labour	John Churchill	19,885	39.89	+1.39
Labour	John Fleming	19,225	38.57	+2.65
Labour	James Roberts	19,209	38.53	
Labour	Jack Arthurs	18,694	37.50	+3.25
Labour	Ethel Harris	18,045	36.20	+3.93
Labour	Phil Holloway	17,763	35.63	
Labour	William Sadd	17,728	35.56	
Labour	William Wilson	17,544	35.19	
Labour	Henry Lees	17,438	34.98	
Labour	Percival Hansen	17,413	34.93	−1.49
Labour	Edward Williams	17,223	34.55	
Labour	Frank O'Flynn	16,969	34.04	
Labour	Albert Wathey	16,548	33.20	
Communist	Connie Birchfield	6,672	13.38	
Communist	Peter McAra	4,708	9.44	
