= 1950 Wellington mayoral election =

New Zealand local election

- 18 November 1950
- Turnout: 33,802 (31.75%)
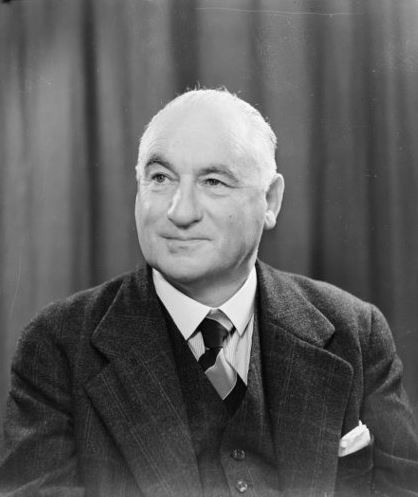

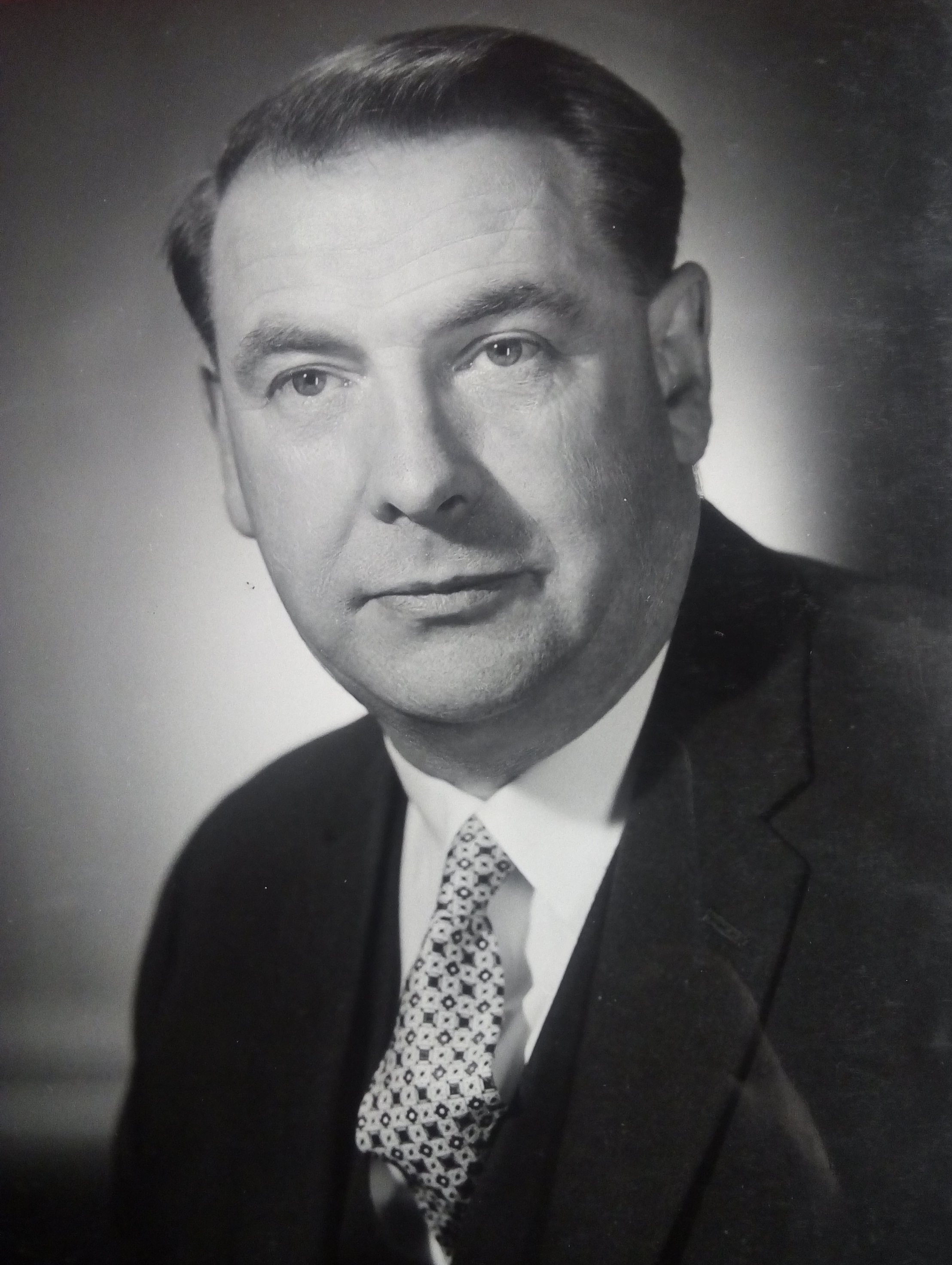
Candidate	Robert Macalister	Frank Kitts
Party	Citizens'	Labour
Popular vote	17,582	15,821
Percentage	52.02	46.80
Mayor before election
Will Appleton
Elected mayor
Robert Macalister

The 1950 Wellington mayoral election was part of the New Zealand local elections held that same year. In 1950, elections were held for the Mayor of Wellington plus other local government positions including fifteen city councillors. The polling was conducted using the standard first-past-the-post electoral method.

== Background ==
Incumbent Mayor Will Appleton did not seek a third term. His future in the mayoralty beyond the term was subject to speculation following his selection as the National Party's candidate for the Wellington Central seat at the 1949 election. He was replaced as the Citizens' Association mayoral candidate by his deputy, Robert Macalister. The Citizens' Association was in disarray following an embarrassing council ticket selection row with several incumbents dumped from the ticket standing as an independent ticket. The group consisting of Councillors Malcolm Galloway, Berkeley Dallard, Sandy Pope, Len Jacobsen issued a statement saying: "Our stand is a protest against an unwise and grossly unjust selection of a secret clique." All but Dallard were defeated.

The Wellington Labour Representation Committee (LRC) twice rejected recommendations from the Labour Party's national executive to not contest the mayoralty. The LRC carried an amendment that unless a full ticket (including a mayoral nomination) was to be fielded, the local-body elections would not be contested. Despite the amendment passing, the party had no obvious mayoral candidate to put forward. Local Labour member Gerald O'Brien suggested civil servant and debating club leader Frank Kitts should stand. Kitts, who had the limited political experience of contesting the Waitomo electorate in 1949, was reluctant but was persuaded to do so. Kitts was duly selected as the party's mayoral candidate. While Kitts did not win the mayoralty, he and five others were the first Labour candidates elected as councillors since the 'Nathan Incident' in 1941. Labour actually won a majority of the vote, however due to an uneven vote dispersal between their candidates, they failed to win a majority on the council.

== Mayoralty results ==
1950 Wellington mayoral election
Party	Candidate	Votes	%	±%
Citizens'	Robert Macalister	17,582	52.02	
Labour	Frank Kitts	15,821	46.80	
Informal votes		399	1.18	+0.39
Majority		1,761	5.20	
Turnout		33,802	31.75	−18.88

== Councillor results ==
1950 Wellington City Council election
Party	Candidate	Votes	%	±%
Citizens'	Elizabeth Gilmer	18,133	53.64	−7.06
Labour	Mervyn Castle	17,050	50.44	
Citizens'	Charles Treadwell	16,023	47.40	−7.49
Citizens'	Ernest Toop	15,723	46.51	−5.18
Labour	Frank Kitts	15,657	46.31	
Citizens'	Stewart Hardy	14,501	42.89	−8.48
Citizens'	Harry Nankervis	14,493	42.87	−7.24
Citizens'	William Birtwhistle	14,076	41.64	−5.01
Labour	John Churchill	13,961	41.30	+1.41
Citizens'	William Stevens	13,636	40.34	−9.38
Labour	James Roberts	13,627	40.31	+1.78
Labour	William Sadd	13,561	40.11	+4.55
Citizens'	Denis McGrath	13,523	40.00	−9.10
Labour	Jack Arthurs	13,472	39.85	+2.35
Ind. Citizens'	Berkeley Dallard	13,434	39.74	+6.60
Labour	Nigel Taylor	13,394	39.62	
Citizens'	Jack Living	13,297	39.33	−6.73
Ind. Citizens'	Malcolm Galloway	13,246	39.18	−12.57
Citizens'	Stanley Dean	12,932	38.25	+17.56
Labour	John Fleming	12,913	38.20	−0.37
Labour	Ethel Harris	12,865	38.05	+1.85
Citizens'	Ian Matheson	12,862	38.04	
Labour	Jim Bateman	12,770	37.77	
Labour	George Mathew	12,200	36.09	
Ind. Citizens'	Sandy Pope	12,172	36.00	−14.93
Labour	James Neale	12,110	35.82	
Labour	Raymond Toole	12,036	35.60	
Labour	Frank O'Flynn	12,011	35.53	+1.49
Ind. Citizens'	Len Jacobsen	11,796	34.89	−16.75
Labour	Ernest Tregoweth	11,698	34.60	
Citizens'	Jim McDonald	11,687	34.57	
Citizens'	Edgar Goulden	9,273	27.43	
Independent	William Bacon	6,460	19.11	+0.50
Independent	Leslie Austin	4,983	14.74	−6.47
Independent	Thomas Callingham	3,899	11.53	+6.20
Communist	Connie Birchfield	1,733	5.12	−8.26
Communist	William Hunter	1,661	4.91	
Communist	Charlie Brooks	1,660	4.91	
Communist	Albert Birchfield	1,591	4.70	
Communist	Dorothy Stanton	1,239	3.66	
Communist	Ron Smith	1,183	3.49	
Communist	Kenneth Stanton	1,088	3.21	
Communist	Mary Ann Heptinstall	1,077	3.18	
Communist	Ray Nunes	864	2.55	
