= 1953 Wellington mayoral election =

New Zealand local election

- 31 October 1953
- Turnout: 44,700 (65.19%)
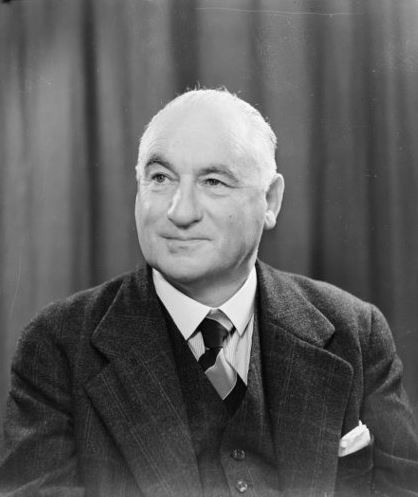

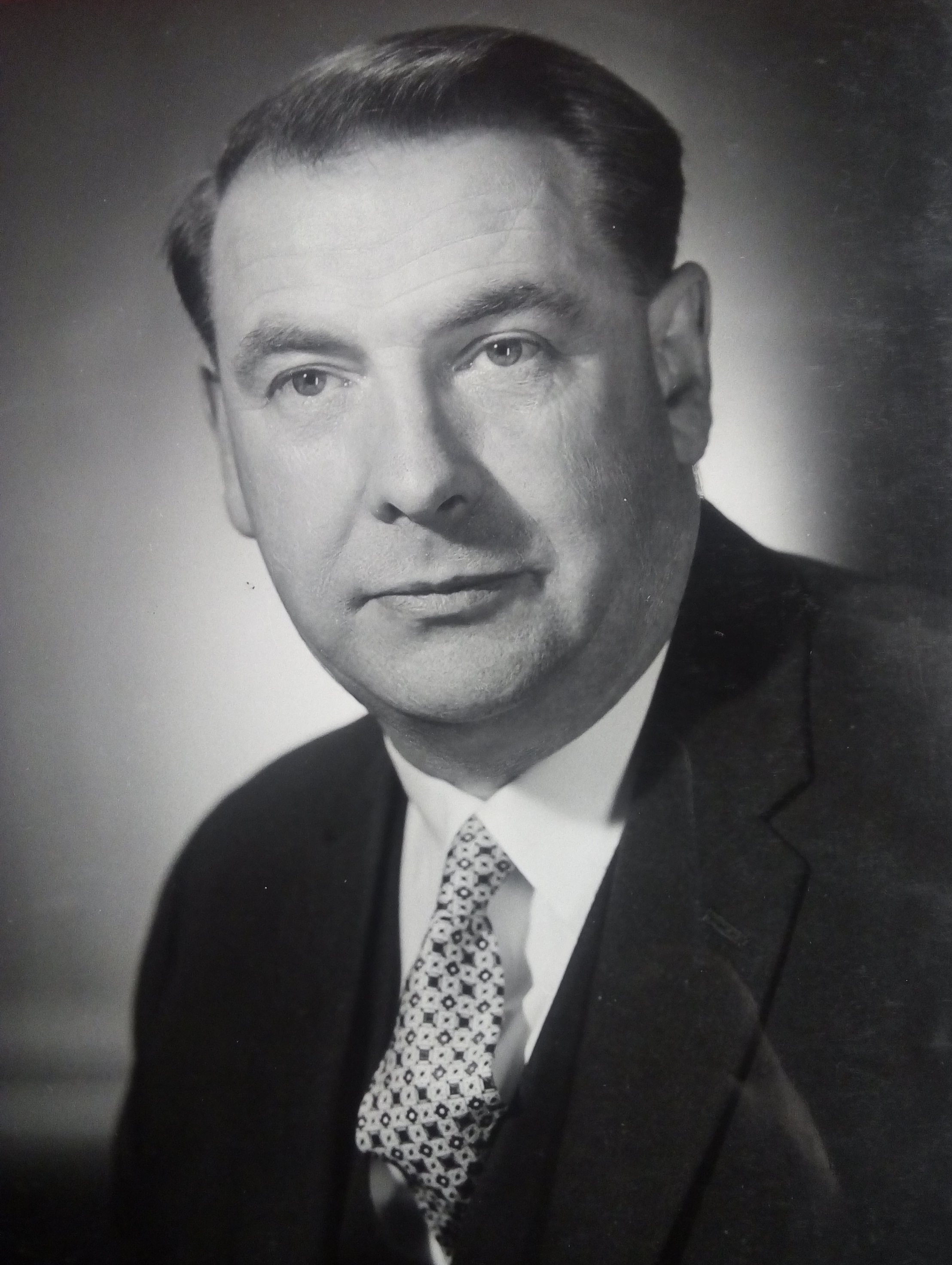
| Candidate | Robert Macalister | Frank Kitts |
| Party | Citizens' | Labour |
| Popular vote | 21,809 | 20,094 |
| Percentage | 48.78 | 44.95 |
Mayor before election
Robert Macalister
Elected mayor
Robert Macalister

The 1953 Wellington mayoral election was part of the New Zealand local elections held that same year. In 1953, elections were held for the Mayor of Wellington plus other local government positions including fifteen city councillors. The polling was conducted using the standard first-past-the-post electoral method.

== Background ==
Citizens'
The incumbent mayor, Robert Macalister, announced his intention to stand for a second term. However, he was not the only aspirant for the Citizens' Association nomination. Despite an incumbent mayor in the running, unusually there were three other nominations. The four candidates before the Citizens' Association Committee were:

- Stewart Hardy, a lawyer and city councillor since 1947
- Ken Luke, the recently retired City Engineer
- Robert Macalister, the sitting mayor since 1950
- Ernest Toop, a businessman and city councillor since 1944

Macalister won renomination for the Citizens' candidacy.

Labour
The Labour Party re-selected city councillor Frank Kitts, who was its candidate in 1950.

== Campaign ==
The mayoral contest was essentially a rematch from three years previously between Macalister and Kitts. There was the addition of a third candidate, Julius Hyde, stood as an independent campaigning on his opposition to the construction of an international airport in Wellington.

A major talking point in the lead up to the election was the potential of a clash with the 1953 Royal Tour. There were proposals to postpone local elections until early 1954 over fears of reduced turnout due to a conflicted schedule. The proposals were considered by the Minister of Internal Affairs William Bodkin, who ultimately decided against it.

== Mayoralty results ==
1953 Wellington mayoral election
| Party | Candidate | Votes | % | ±% |
|---|---|---|---|---|
| Citizens' | Robert Macalister | 21,809 | 48.78 | −3.24 |
| Labour | Frank Kitts | 20,094 | 44.95 | −1.85 |
| Independent | Julius Hyde | 2,410 | 5.39 | |
| Informal votes | | 387 | 0.86 | −0.32 |
| Majority | | 1,715 | 3.83 | −1.37 |
| Turnout | | 44,700 | 65.19 | +33.44 |

== Councillor results ==
1953 Wellington City Council election
| Party | Candidate | Votes | % | ±% |
|---|---|---|---|---|
| Labour | Frank Kitts | 23,041 | 51.54 | +4.93 |
| Citizens' | Ken Luke | 22,993 | 51.43 | |
| Citizens' | Stewart Hardy | 21,323 | 47.70 | +4.81 |
| Citizens' | Bill Arcus | 20,731 | 46.37 | |
| Citizens' | Ernest Toop | 20,446 | 45.74 | −0.77 |
| Citizens' | Bob Archibald | 20,052 | 44.85 | |
| Citizens' | Barry Barton-Ginger | 19,880 | 44.47 | |
| Labour | James Roberts | 19,771 | 44.23 | +3.92 |
| Labour | John Churchill | 19,547 | 43.72 | +2.42 |
| Labour | Jim Bateman | 18,709 | 41.85 | +4.08 |
| Citizens' | Berkeley Dallard | 18,608 | 41.62 | +1.88 |
| Citizens' | Harry Nankervis | 18,089 | 40.46 | −2.41 |
| Citizens' | Denis McGrath | 17,442 | 39.02 | −0.98 |
| Labour | Jack Arthurs | 17,200 | 38.47 | −1.38 |
| Labour | Mervyn Castle | 16,995 | 38.02 | −12.42 |
| Citizens' | Duff Daysh | 16,950 | 37.91 | |
| Labour | George O'Leary | 16,643 | 37.23 | |
| Citizens' | William Birtwhistle | 16,386 | 36.65 | −4.99 |
| Labour | Jim Collins | 16,383 | 36.64 | |
| Labour | Ernie Langford | 16,255 | 36.36 | |
| Labour | Hugh Kelleher | 16,207 | 36.25 | |
| Labour | Frank O'Flynn | 16,192 | 36.22 | +0.69 |
| Labour | James Hickey (Note: Hickey had been co-opted to the council in April 1953 from the Johnsonville Town Board) | 15,917 | 35.60 | |
| Independent | Elizabeth Gilmer | 15,848 | 35.45 | −18.19 |
| Citizens' | William Stevens | 15,704 | 35.13 | −5.21 |
| Citizens' | Robert Burton | 15,640 | 34.98 | |
| Labour | William Sadd | 15,414 | 34.48 | −5.63 |
| Citizens' | Charles Treadwell | 15,392 | 34.43 | −12.97 |
| Labour | Ethel Harris | 15,209 | 34.02 | −4.03 |
| Citizens' | Gilbert Lawrence | 14,886 | 33.30 | |
| Labour | Edward Hodgkinson | 14,865 | 33.25 | |
| Independent | Gilbert MacLean | 13,267 | 29.68 | |
| Independent | William Bacon | 8,249 | 18.45 | −0.66 |
| Independent | James Duncan | 7,941 | 17.76 | |
| Independent | Leslie Austin | 6,612 | 14.79 | +0.05 |
| Independent | George Joseph | 6,519 | 14.58 | |
| Independent | Ernest Killick | 5,336 | 11.93 | |
| Communist | Donald Austin | 4,009 | 8.96 | |
| Communist | Connie Birchfield | 2,299 | 5.14 | +0.02 |
| Communist | William Hunter | 2,005 | 4.48 | −0.43 |
| Communist | Dorothy Stanton | 1,791 | 4.00 | +0.34 |
| Communist | Edward Harvey | 1,700 | 3.80 | |
| Communist | Kenneth Stanton | 1,504 | 3.54 | +0.33 |
| Communist | Sydney Smith | 1,369 | 3.06 | |
| Communist | Thomas Heptinstall | 1,134 | 2.53 | |
| Communist | Ray Nunes | 1,128 | 2.52 | −0.03 |

Table footnotes:
