= 1956 Wellington mayoral election =

New Zealand local election

- 17 November 1956
- Turnout: 38,105 (47.68%)
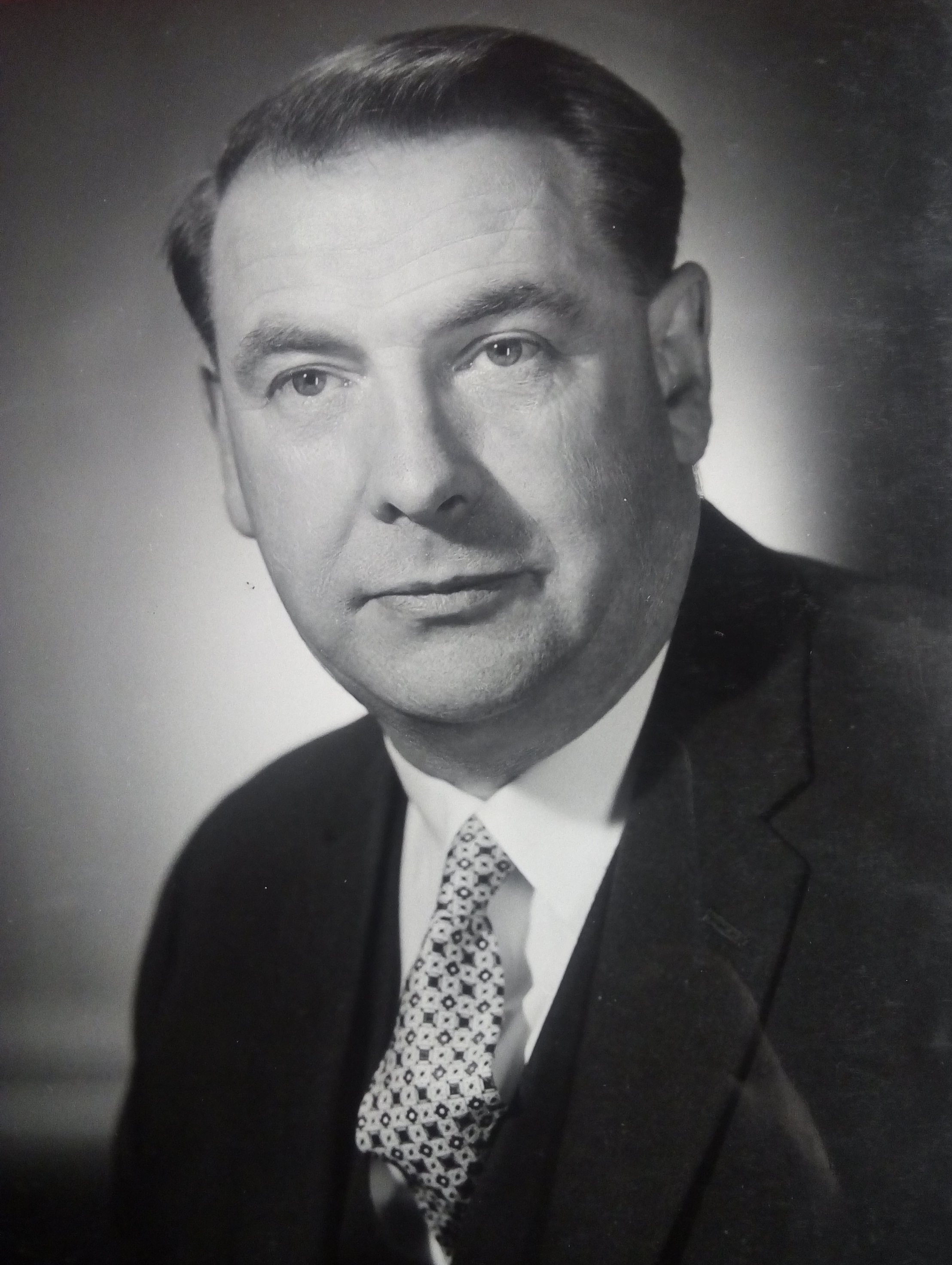

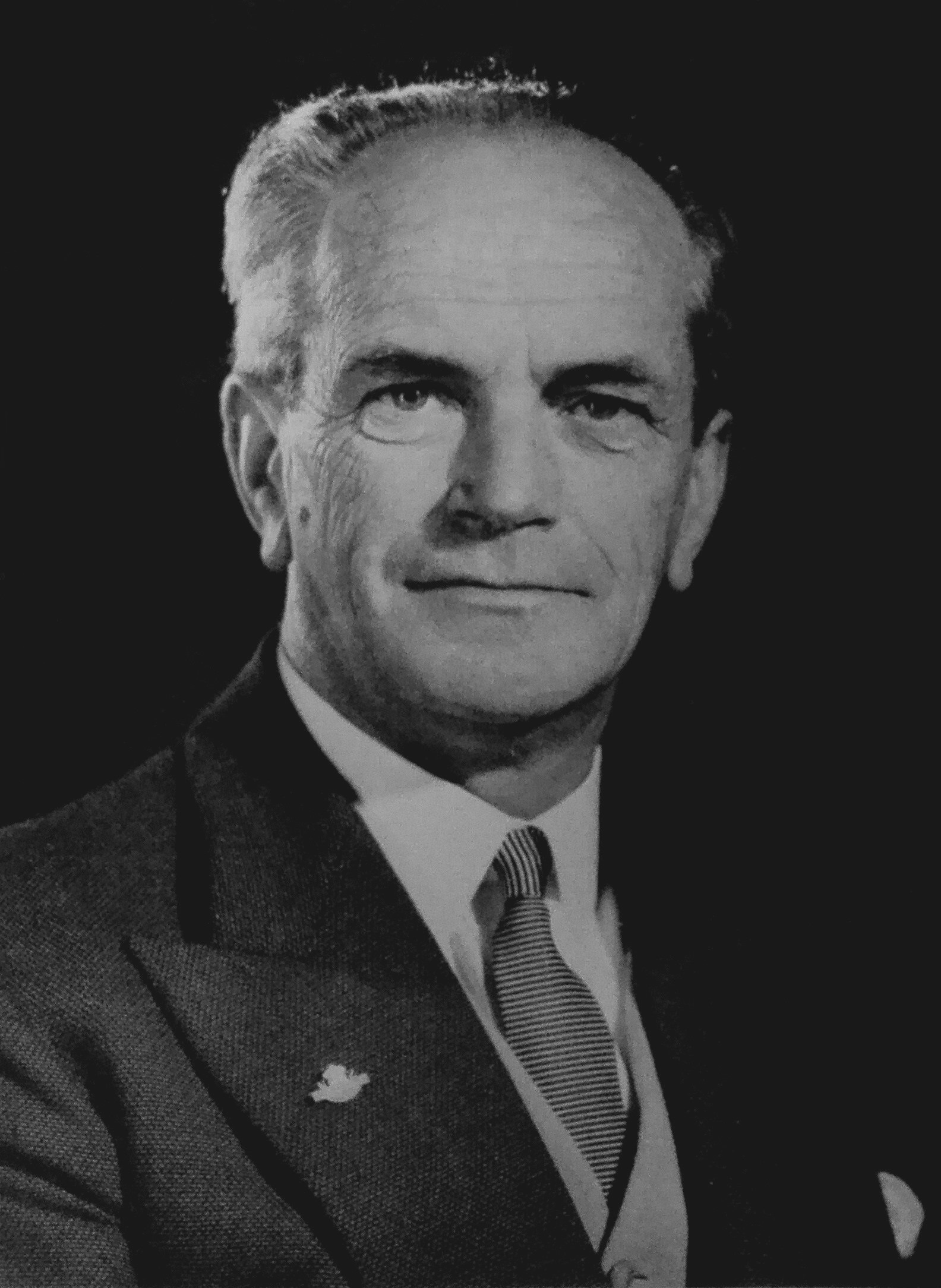

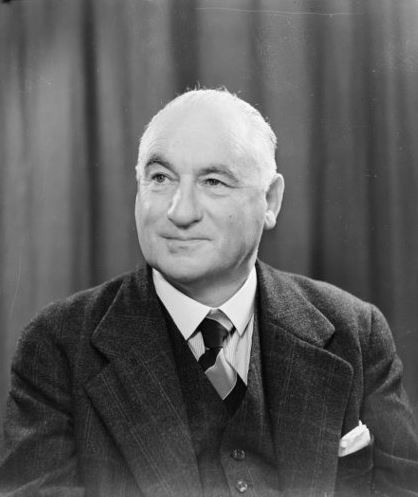
Candidate	Frank Kitts	Ernest Toop	Robert Macalister
Party	Labour	Citizens'	Independent
Popular vote	14,674	11,920	10,783
Percentage	38.50	31.28	28.29
Mayor before election
Robert Macalister
Elected mayor
Frank Kitts

The 1956 Wellington mayoral election was part of the New Zealand local elections held that same year. In 1956, elections were held for the Mayor of Wellington plus other local government positions including fifteen city councillors. The polling was conducted using the standard first-past-the-post electoral method.

== Background ==
The 1956 mayoral election was conducted amidst a selection controversy by the right-leaning Citizens' Association. Under the impression that incumbent mayor Robert Macalister was not intending to seek a third term as Mayor, Ernest Toop applied to gain nomination as the official Citizens' candidacy. As Toop was the only applicant he was successful. However, Macalister had intended to run for mayor again and assumed he, as incumbent, would gain automatic nomination. Undeterred, Macalister ran for mayor again as an independent which split the Citizens' vote enabling Labour's Frank Kitts to win the mayoralty. Kitts became Wellington's first Labour Mayor in 46 years following David McLaren's defeat in 1913.

Labour also polled more votes than the Citizens' Association for the council as well. However it won fewer seats due to a high concentration of Labour votes on several candidates with the remainder of the ticket receiving far less, compared to the Citizens' vote which was more evenly dispersed across its ticket. This was compounded due to Kitts running jointly for both mayor and council. He topped the poll in the council vote, but his election was voided by virtue of winning the mayoralty which saw his council seat awarded to the highest polling unsuccessful candidate, Donald Griffin, who was on the Citizens' ticket. Initially it was to be awarded to another Labour candidate, Thomas Cameron, but after special votes had been counted Griffin has surpassed Cameron's tally.

== Mayoralty results ==
1956 Wellington mayoral election
Party	Candidate	Votes	%	±%
Labour	Frank Kitts	14,674	38.50	−6.45
Citizens'	Ernest Toop	11,920	31.28	
Independent	Robert Macalister	10,783	28.29	−20.49
Independent	Julius Hyde	728	1.91	−3.48
Majority		2,754	7.22	
Turnout		38,105	47.68	−17.51

== Councillor results ==
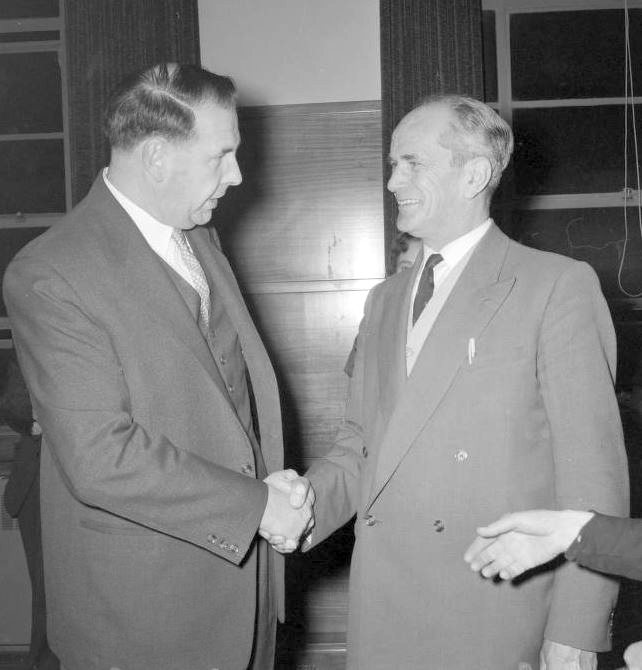
Toop (right) congratulating Kitts (left) on his victory.

1956 Wellington City Council election
Party	Candidate	Votes	%	±%
Labour	Frank Kitts (Note: As Kitts won the Mayoralty his election to the council was voided and his seat was awarded to the highest polling unsuccessful candidate.)	20,346	53.39	+1.85
Citizens'	Bill Arcus	18,820	49.38	+3.01
Citizens'	Allan Highet	18,396	48.27	−5.80
Citizens'	Barry Barton-Ginger	18,130	47.57	+3.10
Labour	John Churchill	17,988	47.20	+3.48
Citizens'	Bob Archibald	17,983	47.19	+2.34
Labour	Jim Bateman	17,798	46.70	+5.15
Labour	James Roberts	17,573	46.11	+2.12
Labour	Mervyn Castle	17,417	45.70	+7.68
Citizens'	Clive Drummond	17,332	45.48	
Citizens'	Berkeley Dallard	17,101	44.87	+3.25
Citizens'	Harry Nankervis	16,934	44.44	+3.98
Labour	Lettie Allen	16,058	42.14	
Citizens'	Max Wall	15,239	39.99	
Labour	Jack Arthurs	15,143	39.74	+1.27
Citizens'	Donald Griffin	14,887	39.06	
Labour	Thomas Cameron	14,779	38.78	
Labour	Ethel Harris	14,614	38.35	+4.33
Citizens'	John Barnett	14,592	38.29	
Labour	Nigel Taylor	14,505	38.06	
Citizens'	William Birtwhistle	14,275	37.46	
Labour	Jim Collins	14,233	37.35	+0.71
Citizens'	Peter Howman	13,975	36.67	
Labour	Hugh Kelleher	13,864	36.38	+0.02
Citizens'	William Simpson	13,635	35.78	
Labour	Allan Goldsmith	13,453	35.30	
Labour	Edward Hodgkinson	13,292	34.88	+1.63
Labour	Alfred Elgar	12,480	32.75	
Independent	Gilbert MacLean	12,228	32.09	−2.41
Citizens'	William Morgan	12,153	31.89	
Citizens'	Mark Kennington	11,995	31.47	
Independent	William Bacon	8,399	22.04	−3.59
Independent	Leslie Austin	7,196	18.88	+4.09
Independent	William Rea	3,871	10.15	
Independent	Charles Lethaby	3,508	9.20	
Communist	William Hunter	3,365	8.83	+4.45
Communist	Albert Birchfield	2,465	6.46	

Table footnotes:
