= 1933 Wellington mayoral election =

New Zealand local election

- 4 May 1933
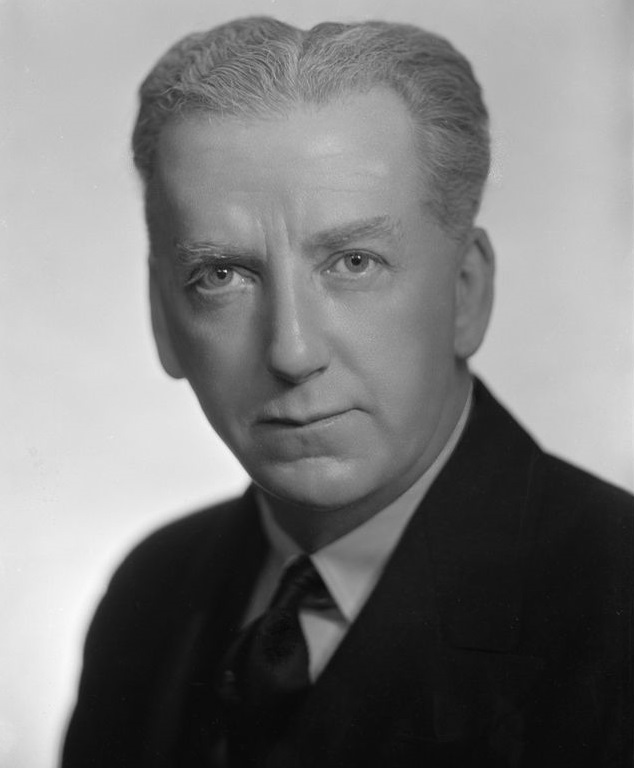
Candidate	Thomas Hislop
Party	Citizens'
Popular vote	elected unopposed
Mayor before election
Thomas Hislop
Elected mayor
Thomas Hislop

The 1933 Wellington mayoral election was part of the New Zealand local elections held that same year. In 1933, elections were held for the Mayor of Wellington plus other local government positions including the fifteen city councillors, also elected biannually. Thomas Hislop, the incumbent Mayor sought re-election and retained office unopposed with no other candidates emerging. The polling was conducted using the standard first-past-the-post electoral method.

== Background ==
The Labour Party chose not to stand a candidate for the mayoralty and decided to put all its resources in to winning a majority on the council, thinking this was the best way to achieve their goals. Labour actually polled more votes than the conservative Citizens' Association, but won fewer seats by virtue of most Labour votes being won by several popular candidates with the rest of the ticket trailing well behind them, whilst the Citizens' vote was far more evenly spread among its candidates. This was to be the first of five local elections where Labour won a majority of votes but did not gain control of the council. However Labour did manage to carry on momentum to win a by-election later in the year and thereby increase their representation.

== Councillor results ==
1933 Wellington local election
Party	Candidate	Votes	%	±%
Labour	Charles Chapman	13,617	66.42	+18.26
Labour	Robert McKeen	13,196	64.37	+24.08
Labour	Bob Semple	12,687	61.88	+21.84
Citizens'	William Gaudin	10,843	52.89	+4.64
Citizens'	William Bennett	10,772	52.54	+3.06
Citizens'	Martin Luckie	10,003	48.79	
Citizens'	Will Appleton	9,887	48.22	−0.04
Citizens'	Len McKenzie	9,843	48.01	
Independent	Herbert Huggins	9,667	47.15	+6.16
Citizens'	William Duncan	9,621	46.93	+10.96
Citizens'	Thomas Forsyth	9,531	46.49	+2.73
Labour	Tom Brindle	9,408	45.89	+20.22
Independent	Frank Meadowcroft	9,162	44.62	+6.61
Independent	John Burns	9,113	44.45	−7.58
Labour	Peter Butler	8,993	43.86	+19.10
Citizens'	Robert Macalister	8,876	43.29	
Labour	Andrew Parlane	8,746	42.66	+17.28
Labour	John Robertson	8,703	42.45	
Citizens'	Sydney Holm	8,696	42.41	+8.10
Labour	Jim Collins	8,312	40.54	+15.31
Labour	Adam Black	8,249	40.23	
Labour	Michael Walsh	8,158	39.79	+15.56
Labour	James Ranson	8,150	39.75	
Labour	John Tucker	8,046	39.24	
Citizens'	Malcolm Galloway	8,029	39.16	
Labour	Caryll Hay	7,959	38.82	
Labour	James Barras	7,779	37.94	
Citizens'	John Wallace	7,750	37.80	
Citizens'	Herbert Cummings	7,190	35.07	
Citizens'	Stanley Natusch	6,980	34.04	
Citizens'	Paul Hoskins	6,963	33.96	
Citizens'	James Sievwright	5,981	29.17	+2.47
Independent	Charles Lethaby	4,622	22.54	+3.82
Communist	Richard Webb	3,098	15.11	
