= Frank Kitts =

New Zealand politician

Sir Frank Kitts
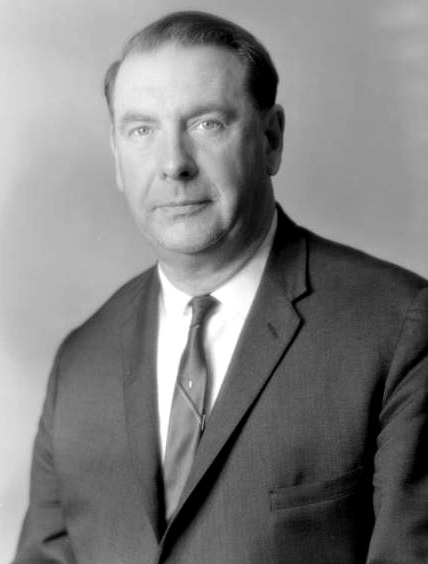

27th Mayor of Wellington
- In office 6 December 1956 – 13 November 1974
- Deputy: See list: Harry Nankervis (1956-60); Bill Arcus (1960–62); Denis McGrath (1962–65); Matt Benney (1965–66); Bob Archibald (1966–70); George Porter (1970-71); John Jeffries (1971–74)
- Preceded by: Robert Macalister
- Succeeded by: Michael Fowler

Member of the New Zealand Parliament for Wellington Central
- In office 13 November 1954 – 26 November 1960
- Preceded by: Charles Chapman
- Succeeded by: Dan Riddiford

Personal details
- Born: Francis Joseph Kitts; 1 May 1912 Waimate, New Zealand
- Died: 16 March 1979 (aged 66) Wellington, New Zealand
- Party: Labour
- Spouse: Iris May Woodcock (m. 1949–1979)
- Occupation: Civil servant
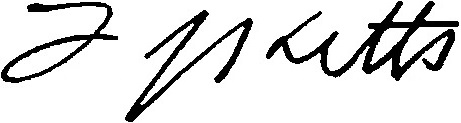
- Signature

Sir Francis Joseph Kitts (1 May 1912 – 16 March 1979) was a New Zealand politician. Originally from the South Island, he served in the military and later was a civil servant before entering politics with the Labour Party. He was the Member of Parliament for Wellington Central between 1954 and 1960. He was also the longest-serving Mayor of Wellington, holding the post from 1956 to 1974. He was also a member at various times of several other local bodies and was still an elected official at his death.

== Early life ==
Kitts was born in Waimate, the son of an Australian quarryman, and attended Marist Brothers primary school alongside his half-brother John before completing his education at Timaru Boys' High School. He was an active athlete and was a talented swimmer also having an interest in both boxing and rugby. He was a firm believer in physical fitness and had a lifelong twice-a-day exercise regimen. Whilst still at high school he joined the Timaru branch of the Labour Party at 16, with his father's encouragement, and was branch president from 1936 to 1938. In 1938 Kitts stood unsuccessfully for the Timaru Borough Council as a Labour candidate. Kitts enlisted in the Royal New Zealand Air Force in July 1940 during World War II and served for five years with the home forces as a staff sergeant. Whilst posted in Otaki he met Iris Woodcock at the local racecourse and the two married in 1949. The couple had no children.

Following the war he moved to Wellington, and worked as a civil servant in a clerical role for the Government Stores Board. He became the vice-president of the Wellington Central branch of the Labour Party in 1947. He was a competent debater and was a team leader for the Wellington Metropolitan Debating Club. He held Saturday morning talks along a walking route down Bowen Street Lambton Quay and Willis Street with residents from all around Wellington, which earned him a public reputation in the city. Kitts walked the route nearly every day for the next 25 years.

Newspaper reports after his death say he was a "man of mystery" as little is known about his early life, and his Who's Who in New Zealand entries in 1971 and 1978 both start with his election to Wellington local bodies in 1950. His brother, Father John Kitts, who was chaplain at the Villa Maria Convent in Brisbane, stated that Kitts seldom spoke of his private life and his wife Iris was the only person who truly knew him.

== Political career ==
=== National politics ===
New Zealand Parliament
| Years | Term | Electorate | Party |
|---|---|---|---|
| 1954–1957 | 31st | Wellington Central | Labour |
| 1957–1960 | 32nd | Wellington Central | Labour |

Kitts stood unsuccessfully for Labour in two elections, in 1949 for Waitomo, and in 1951 for Mount Victoria. He was also speculated as a potential successor to Peter Fraser in the 1951 Brooklyn by-election but declined to stand. He was finally elected as the Member of Parliament for Wellington Central from 1954 to replace the retiring Charles Chapman. Given his mayoral experience the press speculated he was a likely candidate for the role of either Speaker of the House of Representatives or Chairman of Committees after the formation of the Second Labour Government. He was appointed to neither and remained a backbencher. During the government's term, Kitts was one of a group of three Labour MPs (the others being Mick Moohan and Bill Fox) who were deeply critical of the decisions made in the "Black Budget". Kitts supported the 1959 National Roads Amendment Bill, which allowed the construction of free-flowing state highways into urban centres by the government funded by petrol taxes. He also supported the controversial plan by the Ministry of Works to build the Wellington Urban Motorway through the historic Bolton Street Cemetery, arguing it was necessary for commuters to get to and from work.

He was to hold the seat to 1960, when he was unexpectedly defeated by the National candidate Dan Riddiford. He later failed to win back the electorate in 1963. Years later, ahead of the 1969 election, he put himself forward for the Labour nomination to stand in the newly created Porirua electorate, but lost out to Gerry Wall. Kitts' brother said that not remaining in Parliament longer had been his biggest regret.

=== Local-body politics ===
At the 1950 local-body elections the Labour Party had no obvious mayoral candidate, and Labour activist Gerald O'Brien suggested to Kitts that he should stand. Kitts was reluctant but was persuaded to do so. He likewise stood for the Wellington City Council, Wellington Harbour Board and Wellington Hospital Board. He polled far better than expected for the mayoralty, but was defeated by Robert Macalister of the Citizens' Association. He was however elected to the City Council, Harbour Board and Hospital Board. In 1953 he stood again for all four offices but was again defeated by Macalister for the mayoralty. His popularity had grown significantly and was not only re-elected to the three local bodies, but topped the poll for all three, gaining more votes than any other candidate, the first time this had been achieved in Wellington history. He served on the Wellington Fire Board from 1954, the Hospital Board from 1950 to 1956 and the Harbour Board from 1950 until his death in 1979. He was also the chairman of the Wellington City and Suburban Water Supply Board, director of the New Zealand Municipalities Co-operative Insurance Company and patron of the City of Wellington Highland Pipe Band.

In 1956 Kitts was elected mayor on his third attempt, exploiting a split vote on the centre-right with Macalister running as an independent after losing the Citizens' Association nomination to Ernest Toop. He became Wellington's first Labour mayor in 46 years. He would remain Wellington's mayor for the next 18 years. During his entire mayoralty Labour never had a council majority and Kitts led Citizens' dominated councils. Accordingly, Kitts adopted a leadership style that encouraged impartial chairmanship of council committees. He was re-elected over Toop (this time his sole opponent) in 1959 despite Labour's council ticket faring much worse with its representation being halved from six seats to three. The overall anti-Labour vote (which was consistent nationwide) was attributed to the unpopularity of the then Labour government. In increasing his majority over twelve percent against the national trend newspapers lauded Kitts' win as a 'personal triumph'.

In 1962 he recorded the highest ever number of votes in a mayoral election in Wellington. He was a "full-time mayor" devoting as full working day to the role and made a point of attending to the ceremonial and social aspects of the mayoralty. He would attend thousands of meetings and functions in the city every year. This was a departure from the traditional concept of the mayoral office as a part-time role for a businessman-politician, which was used unsuccessfully by the Citizens' mayoral candidates in 1959 and 1962 as the basis for their campaigns against Kitts. This backfired on the Citizens' as many groups and businesses in the city appreciated the advent of an "open door policy" for them with the mayoral office. Kitts' had a legendary reputation for food consumption at such functions. He was said to swallow sausage rolls "like he was posting a letter" and famously devoured two cooked chickens in a single sitting.

The city continued to modernise under Kitts, one particular landmark of this was in May 1964 when the council replaced its system of trams for public transport with trolley buses. This was after a long public campaign to retain the trams led by Saul Goldsmith. Kitts himself confessed he had a secret desire to keep the trams, but as the council had a Citizen's majority he could not stop the process, describing the decision to replace them as a "retrograde step." During his mayoralty the council began its foray into public housing. In August 1965 the Hanson Court flats, with 30 low-rental units, were opened in Newtown. This opened a new a civic endeavour that was to produce multiple affordable high-density homes. This was followed by the Te Ara Hou flats, Arlington Flats and the Central Park flats among others, ultimately resulting 2,300 units making Wellington City Council one of the country's largest residential landlords. This was part of a larger urban renewal agenda promoted by Citizens' councillor George Porter, who Kitts thought of as a 'secret socialist' and was happy to support him.

In 1969 he surpassed Thomas Hislop to become Wellington's longest serving mayor. That year, Cuba Street was pedestrianised by his council to create what is now known as Cuba Mall. As mayor Kitts travelled overseas as an ambassador for the city and made a point of visiting every city named Wellington in the world. In 1971 he visited Antarctica. Like Norman Kirk, also from Waimate, he was "a big man, using his imposing six foot two inch, 17 stone frame to overshadow his opponents."

He was unexpectedly defeated by a narrow margin in 1974 by Michael Fowler. The result was so close that several re-counts were required before the final result was known, ending Kitts' record tenure as mayor, though he was still re-elected as a member of the Harbour Board.

=== Post mayoralty ===
To the surprise of most, the Third Labour Government did not appoint him to any higher office. Labour city councillor Joe Aspell said "Thousands expected Frank Kitts to be given something to make use of his considerable ability". He did become President of the Sporting Clubs Association of New Zealand. There was also speculation that he would stand for Parliament once again at the 1975 election for the Wellington seat of Miramar, however he did not put himself forward for the Labour nomination.

In a surprise move, Kitts attempted a political comeback in 1977. He was again defeated by Fowler with his vote share falling further, though contrarily his vote increased for the Harbour Board, to which he was again elected. A Dominion editorial said of Kitts' candidature "No one knew what Frank Kitts did during his three years in the political wilderness and no one knew why he wanted to come back".

== Death ==
Kitts died suddenly on 16 March 1979, aged 67, collapsing at his home after completing a morning shopping trip with his wife. His funeral was held in St Mary of the Angels and attracted over 400 mourners. Tributes were given by Kitts' successor as mayor Michael Fowler and former prime minister Bill Rowling among others. Following the service his body was taken in a civic cortège along his famous walking route along Willis Street, Lambton Quay and Bowen Street to Karori Cemetery where he was buried.

He was still a member of the Harbour Board at his death. A by-election was avoided when Terry Brandon, the highest polling unsuccessful candidate from the 1977 election, was appointed to fill Kitts' vacant seat.

== Frank Kitts Park ==
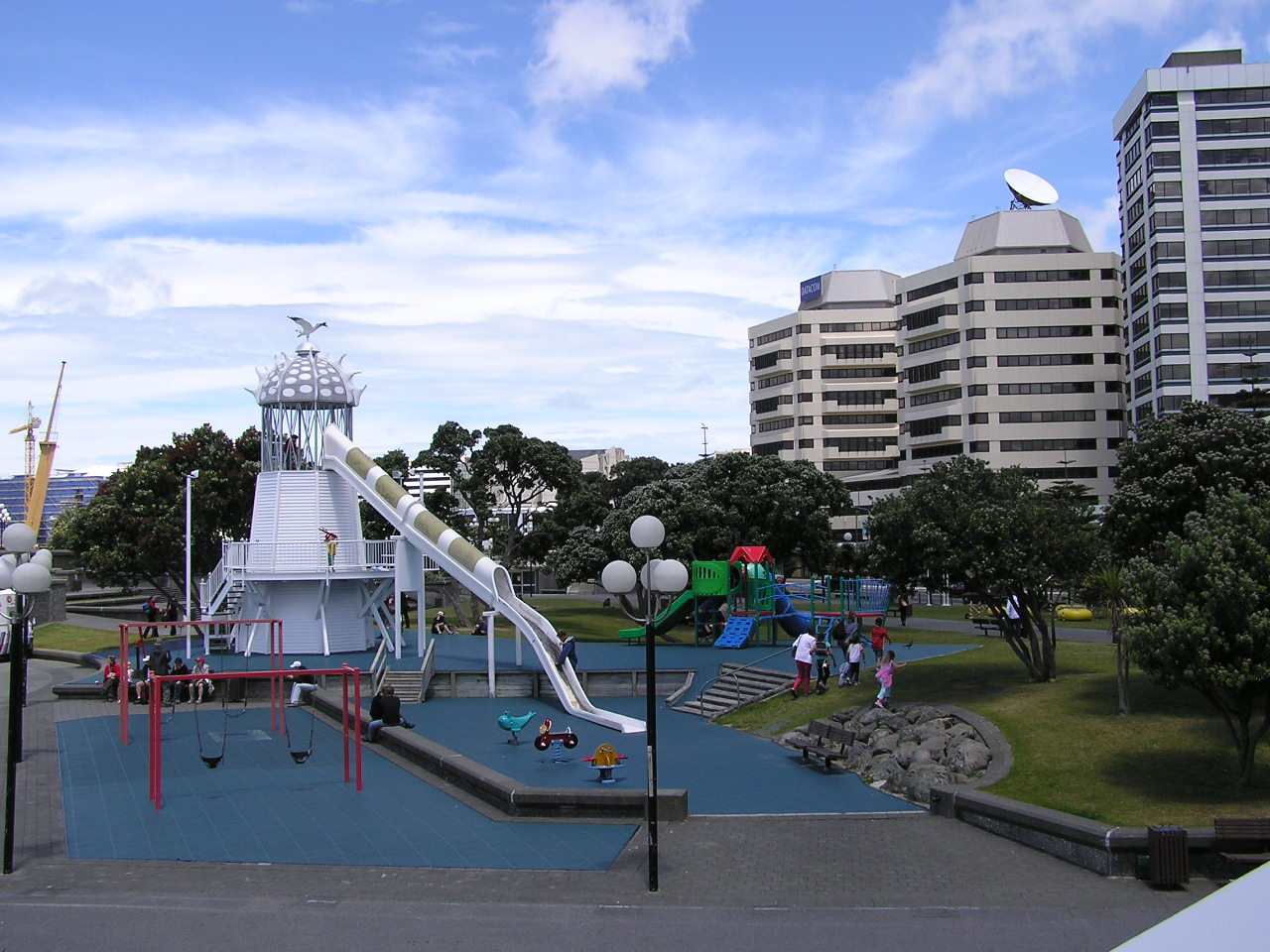
Frank Kitts Park

Frank Kitts Park on Wellington's waterfront is named after him. The park, on the site formerly used for a row of wharf sheds, was opened in 1976 and after redevelopment reopened in 1990. There is a children's playground, the orange foremast recovered from TEV Wahine, and a water sculpture The Albatross by Tanya Ashken.

== Honours ==
Kitts was known for his tireless public service, which continued after his retirement, including helping Wellington's immigrant community. In the 1966 New Year Honours, he was appointed a Knight Bachelor for services as mayor of Wellington. In the 1975 Queen's Birthday Honours, Kitts' wife, Iris, Lady Kitts, was appointed an Officer of the Order of the British Empire, for services to the community as mayoress of Wellington between 1956 and 1974. Iris was well-liked as Mayoress, but attracted sympathy due to unsubstantiated innuendos about her husband being a philanderer.

The Kitts Trophy for Impromptu Speaking is awarded by the Wellington Speaking Union every year. The trophy is named after Kitts, who donated it in 1967 to encourage excellence in impromptu speaking.

== Notes ==
New Zealand Parliament
| Preceded by Charles Chapman | Member of Parliament for Wellington Central; 1954–1960 | Succeeded by Dan Riddiford |
Political offices
| Preceded by Robert Macalister | Mayor of Wellington; 1956–1974 | Succeeded by Michael Fowler |
