= 1931 Wellington mayoral election =

New Zealand local election

- 8 May 1931
- Turnout: 25,799 (56.20%)
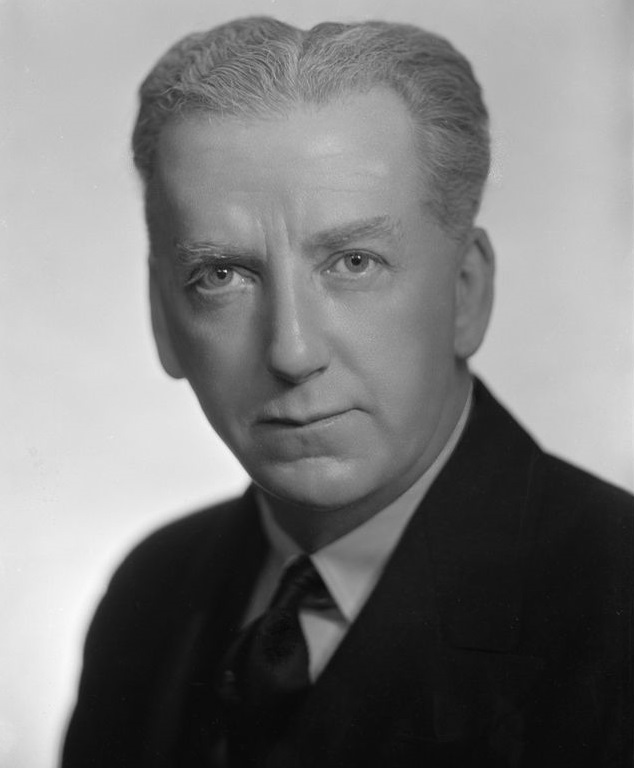

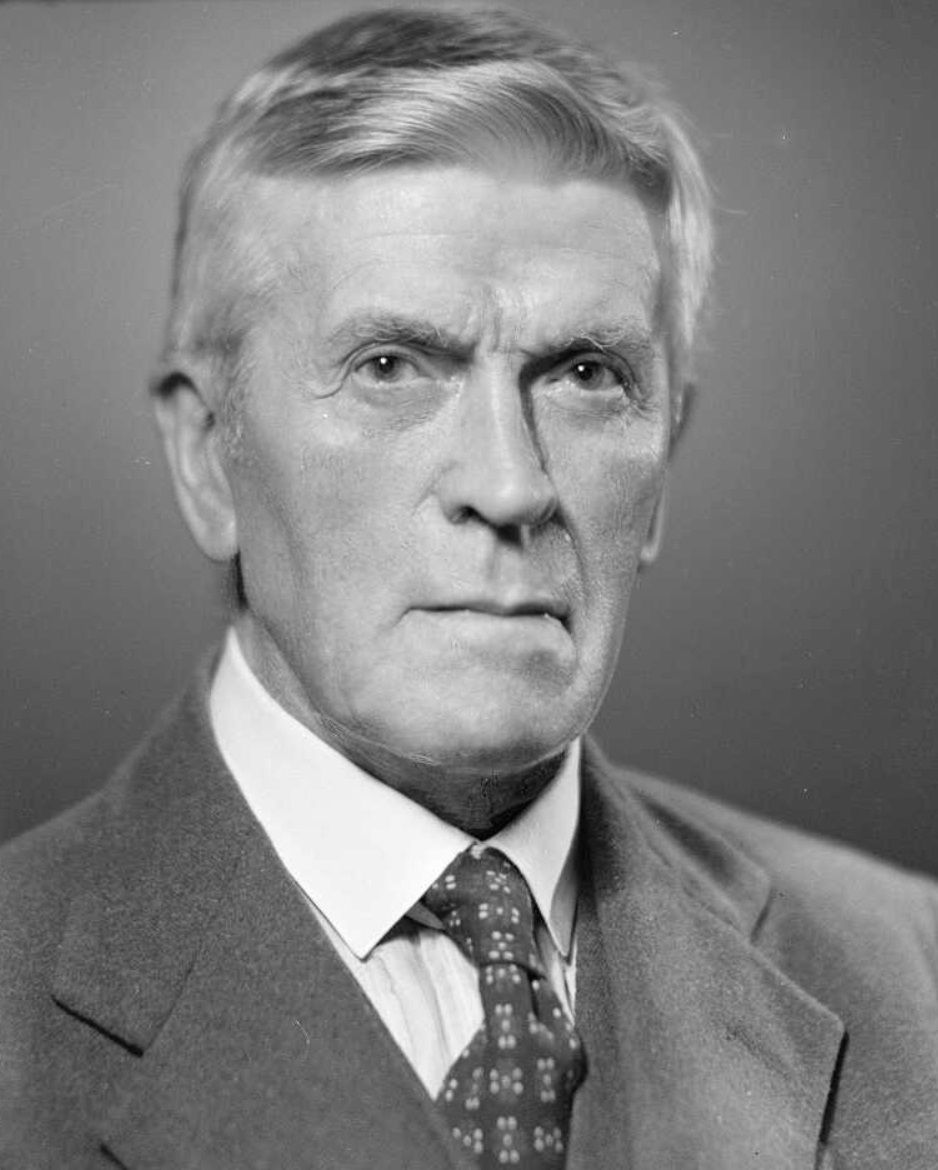
Candidate	Thomas Hislop	Martin Luckie
Party	Civic League	Independent
Popular vote	13,593	11,678
Percentage	52.68	45.26
Mayor before election
George Troup
Elected mayor
Thomas Hislop

The 1931 Wellington mayoral election was part of the New Zealand local elections held that same year. In 1931, elections were held for the Mayor of Wellington plus other local government positions including fifteen city councillors. The polling was conducted using the standard first-past-the-post electoral method.

== Background ==
Mayor George Troup declined to stand for a third term. Councillor Thomas Hislop was selected as his replacement to stand for the Civic League. The Labour Party did not stand a mayoral candidate, the first time they had not done so since 1917. An election was necessitated when the deputy mayor Martin Luckie accepted the request of a deputation of citizens to run for mayor.

== Mayoralty results ==
1931 Wellington mayoral election
Party	Candidate	Votes	%	±%
Civic League	Thomas Hislop	13,593	52.68	
Independent	Martin Luckie	11,678	45.26	
Informal votes		528	2.04	−1.26
Majority		1,915	7.42	
Turnout		25,799	56.20	+0.45

== Councillor results ==
1931 Wellington City Council election
Party	Candidate	Votes	%	±%
Civic League	William Bennett	12,766	49.48	+1.66
Civic League	Will Appleton	12,453	48.26	
Civic League	William Gaudin	12,452	48.25	−0.20
Labour	Charles Chapman	12,425	48.16	+2.96
Civic League	Thomas Forsyth	11,290	43.76	−0.67
Civic League	Herbert Huggins	10,576	40.99	−2.20
Labour	Bob Semple	10,395	40.29	+0.81
Labour	Robert McKeen	10,332	40.04	−1.73
Civic League	Jacob McEldowney	9,966	38.62	
Civic League	Frank Meadowcroft	9,808	38.01	−6.99
Civic League	John Burns	9,514	36.87	+5.53
Civic League	William Duncan	9,282	35.97	
Civic League	Sydney Holm	8,852	34.31	
Civic League	John Wallace	8,480	32.86	
Independent	Jim McDonald	8,351	32.36	
Civic League	George Mitchell	8,186	31.72	−6.72
Independent	Paul Hoskins	7,764	30.09	
Civic League	George Stewart	7,343	28.46	
Independent	Herbert Price	7,304	28.31	
Labour	William Atkinson	7,029	27.24	−2.14
Independent	James Sievwright	6,890	26.70	
Independent	Robert Bothamley	6,829	26.47	
Labour	John Read	6,632	25.70	−3.31
Labour	Tom Brindle	6,624	25.67	−4.03
Labour	Andrew Parlane	6,548	25.38	−1.79
Labour	Jim Collins	6,511	25.23	
Labour	Peter Butler	6,390	24.76	−1.46
Civic League	Amy Kane	6,287	24.36	
Labour	Michael Walsh	6,252	24.23	1.97
Labour	Lawrence Hennessy	6,206	24.05	
Labour	Jim Thorn	5,956	23.08	
Independent	Samuel Martin	5,841	22.64	
Independent	Annie McVicar	5,556	21.53	
Labour	Sarah Snow	5,316	20.60	
Civic League	Charles Lethaby	4,831	18.72	
