= 1926 New Year Honours (New Zealand) =

Annual awards for New Zealanders

The 1926 New Year Honours in New Zealand were appointments by King George V on the advice of the New Zealand government to various orders and honours to reward and highlight good works by New Zealanders. The awards celebrated the passing of 1925 and the beginning of 1926, and were announced on 1 January 1926.

The recipients of honours are displayed here as they were styled before their new honour.

== Privy Councillor ==
- Major the Honourable Joseph Gordon Coates MC – prime minister.
- The Honourable Sir Francis Henry Dillon Bell GCMG KC – attorney-general, minister of external affairs, and leader of the Legislative Council.
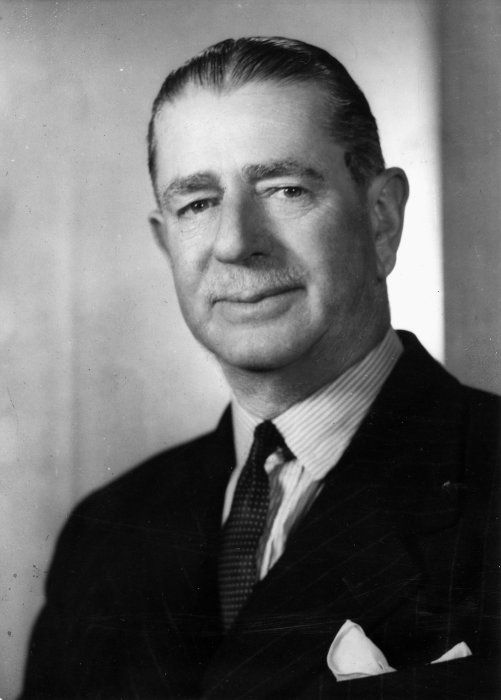
Gordon Coates

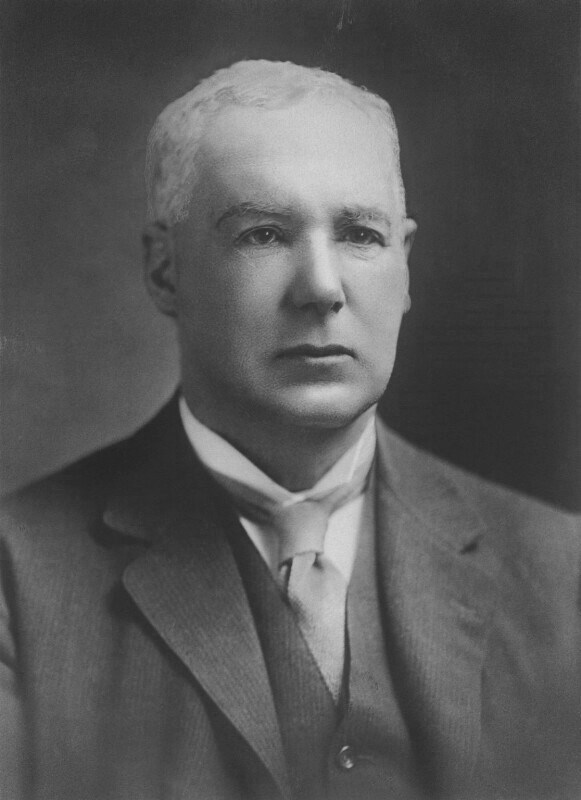
Sir Francis Bell

== Knight Bachelor ==
- Henry Brett – of Auckland; formerly mayor of that city. In recognition of his public services.
- Henry Francis Wigram – of Christchurch; formerly member of the Legislative Council and mayor of Christchurch. In recognition of his public services.
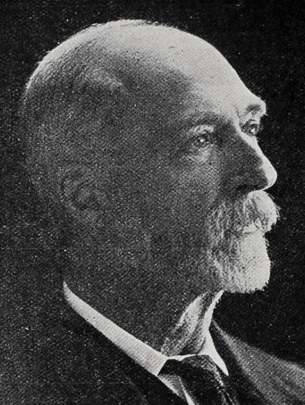
Sir Henry Brett

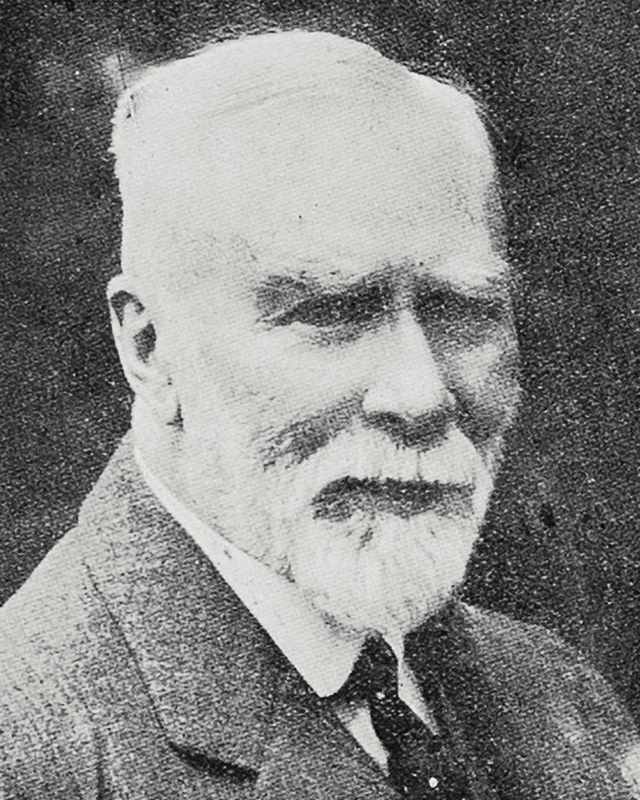
Sir Henry Wigram

== Order of Saint Michael and Saint George ==
=== Knight Grand Cross (GCMG) ===
- Colonel the Honourable Sir James Allen KCB – high commissioner in London for New Zealand.
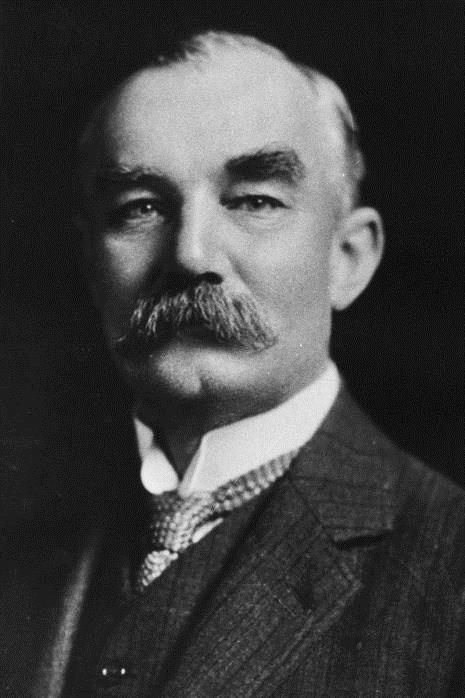
Sir James Allen

=== Companion (CMG) ===
- Frederick William Furkert MICE AMIMechE – engineer-in-chief and under-secretary of the Public Works Department.
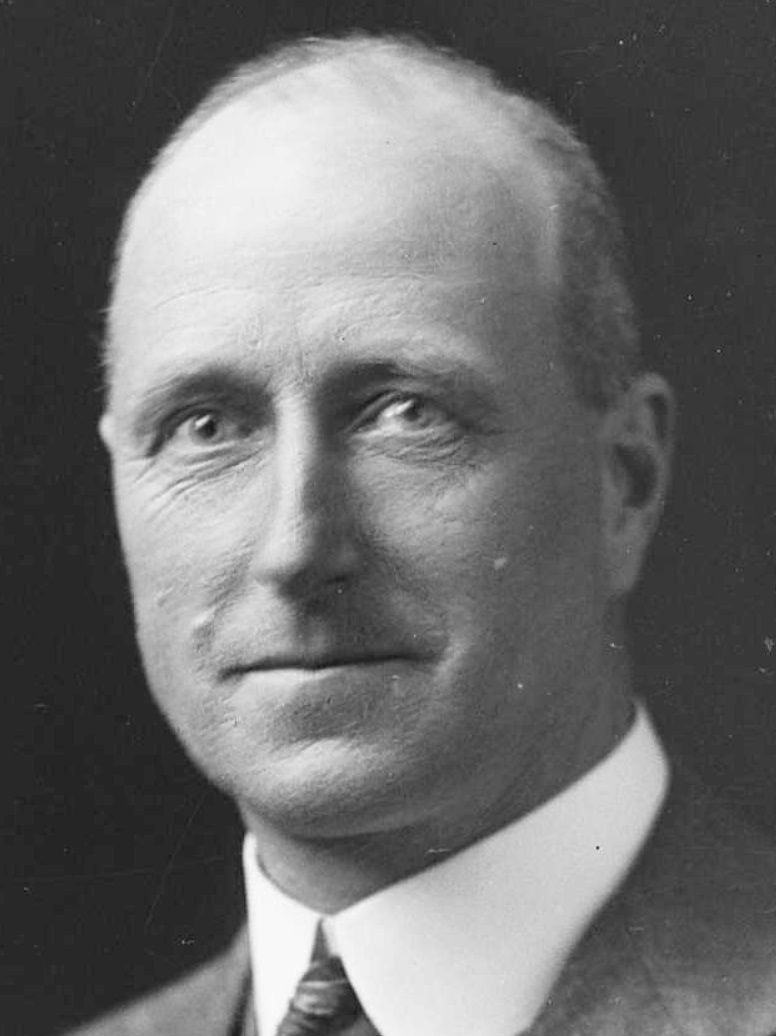
Frederick Furkert
