= Will Appleton =

New Zealand mayor, and rugby league administrator (1889–1958)

Sir William Appleton KStJ
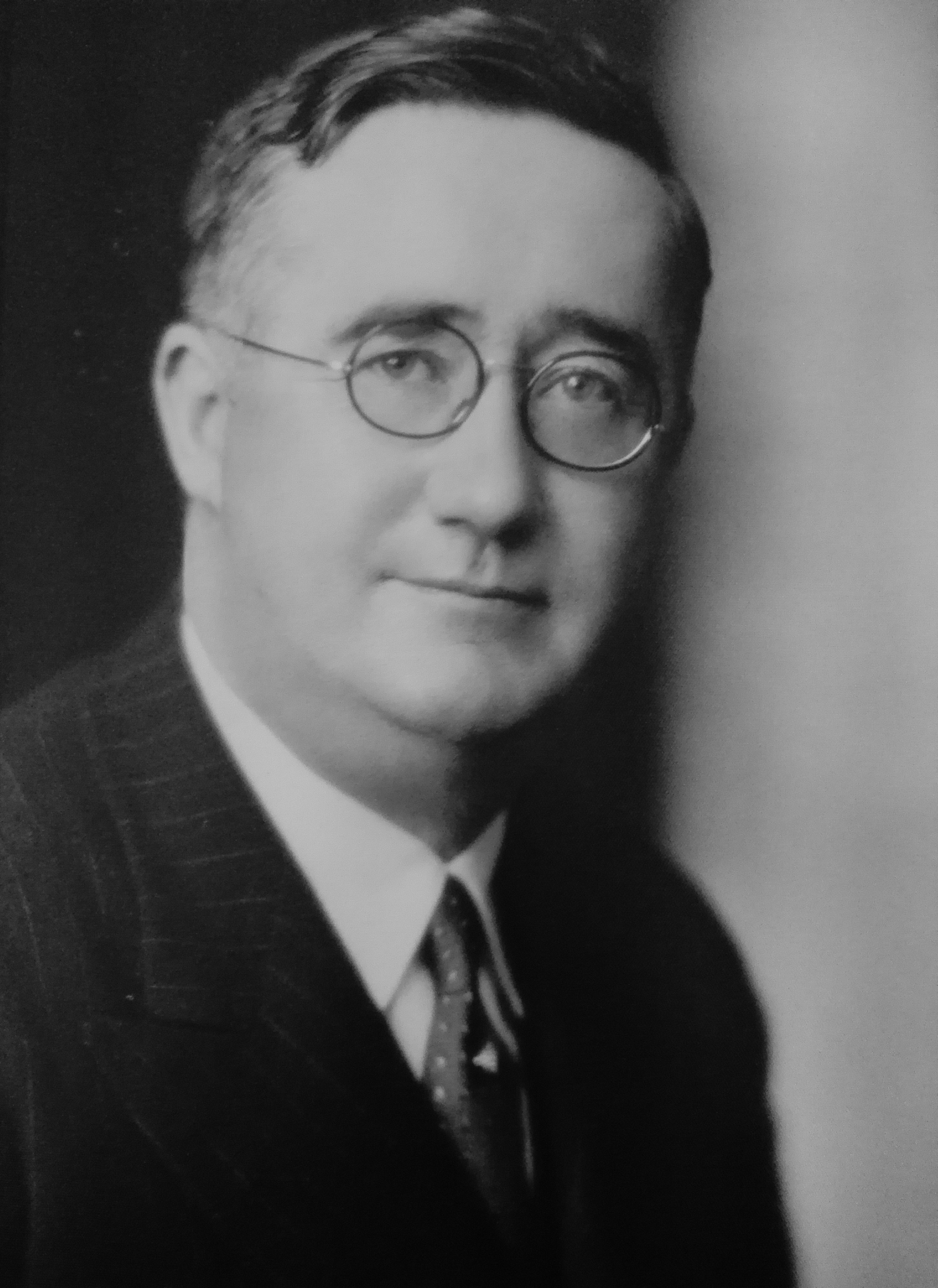

25th Mayor of Wellington
- In office 14 June 1944 – 6 December 1950
- Deputy: Martin Luckie (1944–47); Robert Macalister (1947–50)
- Preceded by: Thomas Hislop
- Succeeded by: Robert Macalister

31st Chair of Wellington Harbour Board
- In office 1954–1957
- Preceded by: William Henry Price
- Succeeded by: Brian Edwin Keiller

Personal details
- Born: 3 September 1889 Alexandra, New Zealand
- Died: 22 October 1958 (aged 69) Wellington, New Zealand
- Party: United (1931–1935); National (1936–58)
- Spouses: Nell Munro (m. 1913; died 1918) Rose Hellewell (m. 1919)
- Children: Five

Sir William Appleton KStJ (3 September 1889 – 22 October 1958) was a New Zealand local body politician, advertising agent and leading company director. He was Mayor of Wellington for two terms from 1944 to 1950 after serving as a city councillor from 1931 to 1944. He was knighted in 1950.

== Biography ==
=== Early life and career ===
Appleton was born in Alexandra in Central Otago in 1889, the eldest of nine children. His parents were Yorkshireman Edwin Appleton and his Scottish wife, Margaret Bruce. The Appleton family briefly moved to Gisborne in 1904 but was back in Alexandra in the following year. Appleton, left by the postmaster in charge of the local post office as a teenager, did some bookkeeping for local businesses. In October 1906, aged 17, he was appointed a cadet in the accountancy department of the General Post Office at Wellington. In 1909 he passed his accountancy exams.

He left the Post and Telegraph Department, then still a centre of modern communications technology, and in April 1910 joined advertising agent Charles Haines and Co. Haines had founded his business, the country's first advertising agency, in Wellington in 1891. Appleton married Mary Helen (Nell) Munro in March 1913. They were to have a daughter and two sons. By the time of the First World War 25-year-old Will Appleton was manager of Charles Haines. He was appointed managing director in 1918. Nell died in 1918's influenza epidemic. The following year he married Rose Hellewell and they had a daughter and two sons. Then in 1932 he sold his interest in Charles Haines to his former partners, accepted directorships in many major listed companies and devoted himself to politics.

=== Political career ===
==== Local politics ====
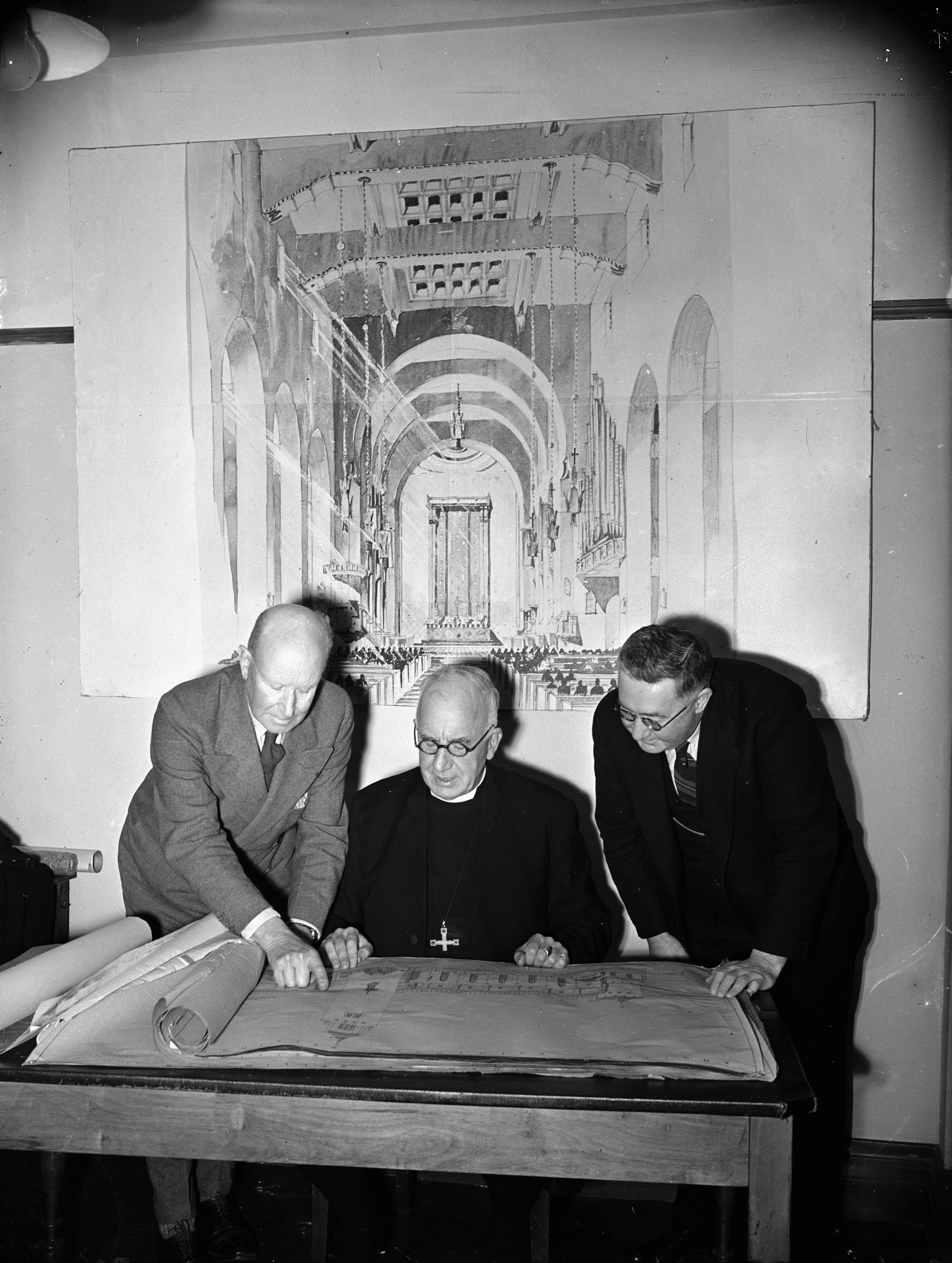
Cathedral architect, Bishop and (Presbyterian) mayor. From left: Cecil Wood, Herbert St Barbe Holland and Appleton discussing plans for the new Wellington Cathedral in 1945

After moving to Wellington, Appleton was elected to the Onslow Borough Council in 1915 where he led a successful campaign for amalgamation with Wellington in order to gain an integrated water and drainage system. In 1923 he was elected to the Wellington Hospital Board on a Civic League ticket and remained a member until 1929.

In 1931 Appleton was elected to the Wellington City Council where he became an effective and popular councillor renowned as being friendly, approachable and possessing a "chuckling" sense of humour. He became chair of the Works Committee and oversaw the introduction of a system of refuse disposal to converted gullies into sports grounds including Appleton Park, which was named after him (formerly it was known as Chaytor Street tip). He was an advocate of moral re-armament and helped prepare the city for wartime contingencies. The council spent money on drawing up plans on how to evacuate the city's wartime population of 123,000, digging underground shelters and constructing concrete bunkers.

In 1944 Appleton challenged Thomas Hislop for the Citizens' nomination to stand for mayor. Appleton claimed he would stand as an independent should he not be granted the candidacy. Declining arbitration, Appleton got his wish when Hislop (albeit reluctantly) agreed to stand aside in the interests of unity. Appleton was elected with a huge majority and was later re-elected for a second term in 1947 by a lower margin before retiring in 1950. In a 1955 by-election Appleton was invited by the Citizens' Association to stand once again for the City Council, though he declined to re-enter local politics. He did remain involved however and was invited as a speaker to a Citizens' Association meeting in 1957 held to discuss their loss of the mayoralty at the 1956 election, following a split between two candidates. The meeting resolved for a more open and democratic selection method for the mayoral candidate.

Appleton served for 21 years as a member of the Wellington Harbour Board, representing Wellington City, and was its chairman from 1954 to 1957.

==== National politics ====
He unsuccessfully stood for Parliament several times. In the 1931 election, he contested the Wellington South electorate for the United Party and was beaten by Robert McKeen. In the 1935 election, he contested the Otaki electorate as an independent candidate and came third. In the 1938 election standing for the National Party in the Wellington Central electorate, he came second but was beaten by Labour's Peter Fraser. He was to stand against Fraser again in the cancelled 1941 general election. In the 1943 election, Appleton was again unsuccessful but came second and greatly reduced Fraser's majority. He did not contest the 1946 election, but stood for a third time in Wellington Central in 1949 election against Fraser's successor Charles Chapman, but was again defeated.

=== Later life and death ===
Appleton was president of the Wellington Rugby Football League from 1940 to 1958 and presented the Appleton Shield, which is used to this day as the premier club trophy. In the 1950 King's Birthday Honours, Appleton was appointed a Knight Bachelor, in recognition of his service as mayor of Wellington. In 1953 he was made a Knight of Grace of the Order of St John, and was awarded the Queen Elizabeth II Coronation Medal. Rose Appleton was appointed a Member of the Order of the British Empire in the 1946 New Zealand Honours, and a Commander of the Order of St John in 1958.

Appleton died of cancer in Bowen Hospital, Wellington, on 22 October 1958. Lady Appleton died in 1980.

His son, Lloyd James Appleton (1923–1985), was a newspaper editor and was elected mayor of Dannevirke in 1965. In the 1971 New Year Honours, he was appointed a Member of the Order of the British Empire, for services to local government and journalism.

== Notes ==
Political offices
Preceded by Thomas Hislop	Mayor of Wellington; 1944–1950	Succeeded by Robert Macalister
Preceded by William Henry Price	Chair of Wellington Harbour Board; 1954–1957	Succeeded by Brian Edwin Keiller
