= Malcolm Galloway =

New Zealand soldier and politician

Malcolm Galloway OBE MC JP
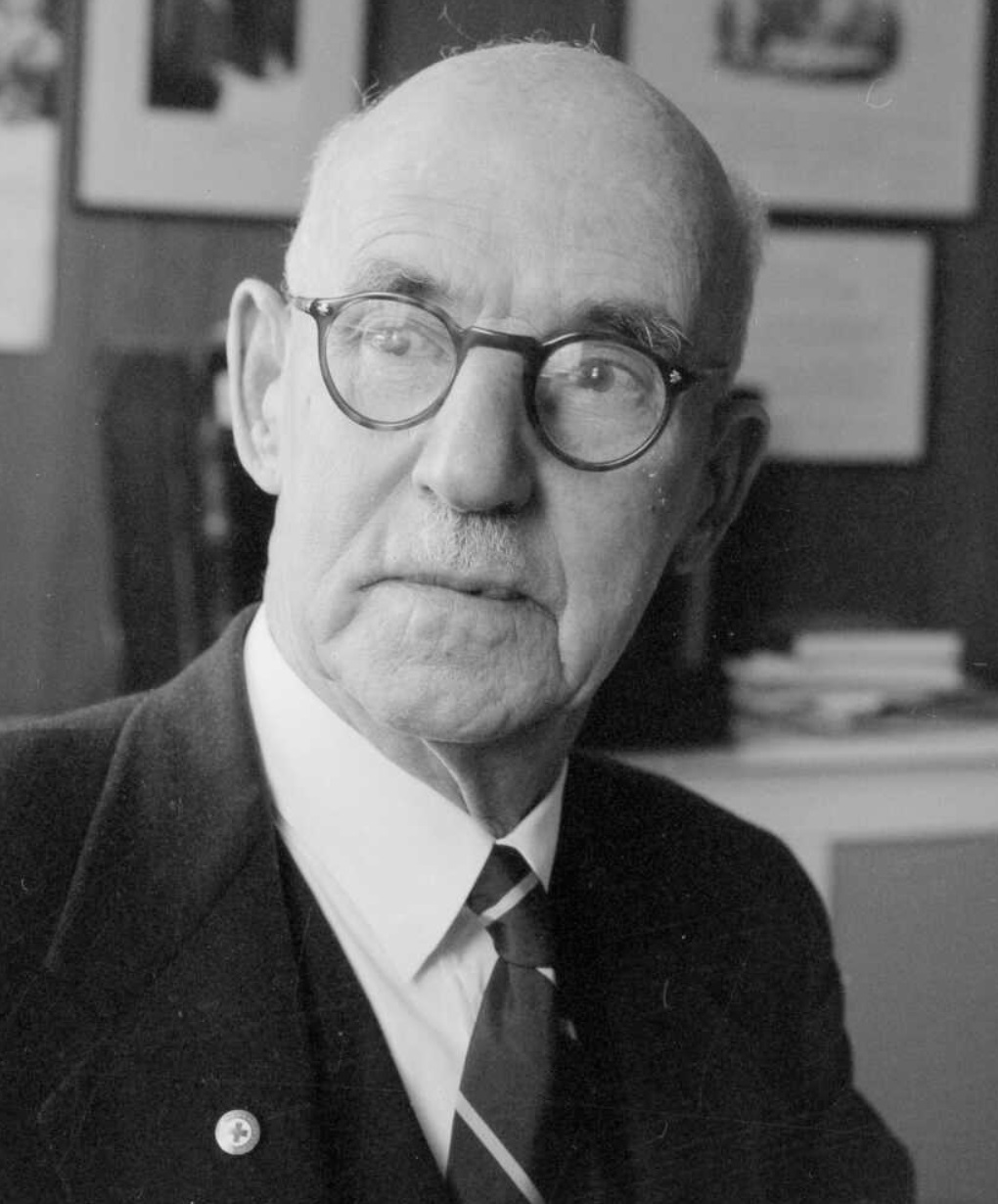

1st Secretary General of the New Zealand Red Cross
- In office 22 December 1931 – 31 March 1960
- Succeeded by: Colin McLennan

Member of the Wellington City Council
- In office 13 October 1943 – 18 November 1950
- Preceded by: William Duncan
- Constituency: At-large

Personal details
- Born: Malcolm Scott Galloway; 7 May 1887 Picton, New Zealand
- Died: 19 July 1978 (aged 91) Christchurch, New Zealand
- Spouse: Margaret McBean (m. 1915; died 1974)
- Children: 3

Malcolm Scott Galloway OBE MC JP (7 May 1887 – 19 July 1978) was a New Zealand soldier, author, and politician. He was a founder and early leader of the New Zealand Red Cross, leading the organisation for 41 years.

== Biography ==
=== Early life and career ===
Galloway was born in Picton in 1887 and was educated at Thorndon School and Banks' Community College. He worked for the firm Sargood, Son & Ewen from 1906 to 1911 and the Thomson Bros, in London from 1911 to 1913. In 1915 he married Margaret McBean. Starting in his youth Galloway was an enthusiastic swimmer. He was a member of a winter swimming group at the Te Aro baths known as the Polar Bear Club for 50 years, a group which once included future Governor-General Bernard Freyberg. Galloway also took interest in surf life-saving and was a vice-president of the Maranui Surf Club.

Galloway enlisted in the army during World War I and left New Zealand as a sergeant in the 5th reinforcements. While stationed in Egypt he was promoted to a commissioned officer. He then took part in the Gallipoli campaign. Afterwards, as a second lieutenant, he was posted to the western front where he was awarded the Military Cross for valour in 1917. Later, he was appointed as the Defence Department's director of occupational and vocational training after the war. He was a member of the executive of the Disabled Servicemen's League.

Galloway began a long association with the Red Cross movement in his role at the Defence Department. He was in charge of vocational and educational training throughout the North Island for sick and wounded servicemen. The Red Cross supplied money for the purchase of occupational training equipment to assist Galloway in his role. 1919 saw the League of Red Cross Societies constituted to ensure the continuation of Red Cross activities during peacetime. It was decided to establish a Red Cross society in every country in the world. Galloway supported New Zealand doing so and it was one of the first countries in the world to endorse the charter. Initially, the society in New Zealand was then a branch of the British Red Cross Society but in 1931 the New Zealand Red Cross society was reconstituted and became a body in its own right. Galloway had previously been secretary-treasurer of the New Zealand branch of the British Red Cross and became secretary general of the New Zealand Red Cross at its inception. He held the role until his retirement in 1960.

=== Political career ===
Galloway was the president of both the Khandallah Progressive Association and Wellington Girls' College Parents Association. As Progressive Association president he was central to lobbying for local improvements. The most prominent were the electrification of the local railway line and Fire Brigade service as well as the development of both the Nairnville reserve and swimming pool.

At both the 1933 and 1938 local elections, Galloway stood for the Wellington City Council on the Citizens Association ticket, but was unsuccessful on both occasions. He was appointed a member of the city council in 1943 to fill a vacancy caused by the death of William Duncan. His appointment was controversial as Charles Chapman was expected to be awarded the vacated seat owing to being the highest polling unsuccessful candidate at the 1941 election not on the council. Despite Galloway not having contested the previous election, he was appointed by the city council to fill the vacancy. He was critical of the government decision for there to be electricity restrictions, even complaining on the record in a council meeting about the council building water-heaters being turned off on winter evenings. At the 1950 election the Citizens' Association had an embarrassing selection row with several incumbents (including Galloway) were dumped from the ticket. They stood regardless as an independent ticket, but Galloway was defeated.

Galloway was also a member of the Wellington Hospital Board for two short spells. He was a member from February 1947 to November 1947 and again from December 1948 to November 1950.

=== Later life and death ===
Galloway died in Christchurch on 19 July 1978, aged 91. He was survived by two sons and one daughter.

== Awards and recognition ==
He was awarded the order of merit by the Japanese and Dutch Red Cross societies for assisting with relief efforts after flood disasters took place in those countries in 1954 and 1956 respectively. In the 1961 Queen's Birthday Honours, Galloway was appointed an Officer of the Order of the British Empire, for his services to the New Zealand Red Cross Society.

== Notes ==
Non-profit organization positions
New title	Secretary General of the New Zealand Red Cross; 1931–1960	Succeeded by Colin McLennan
