= Martin Luckie =

New Zealand cricketer

Martin Luckie OBE
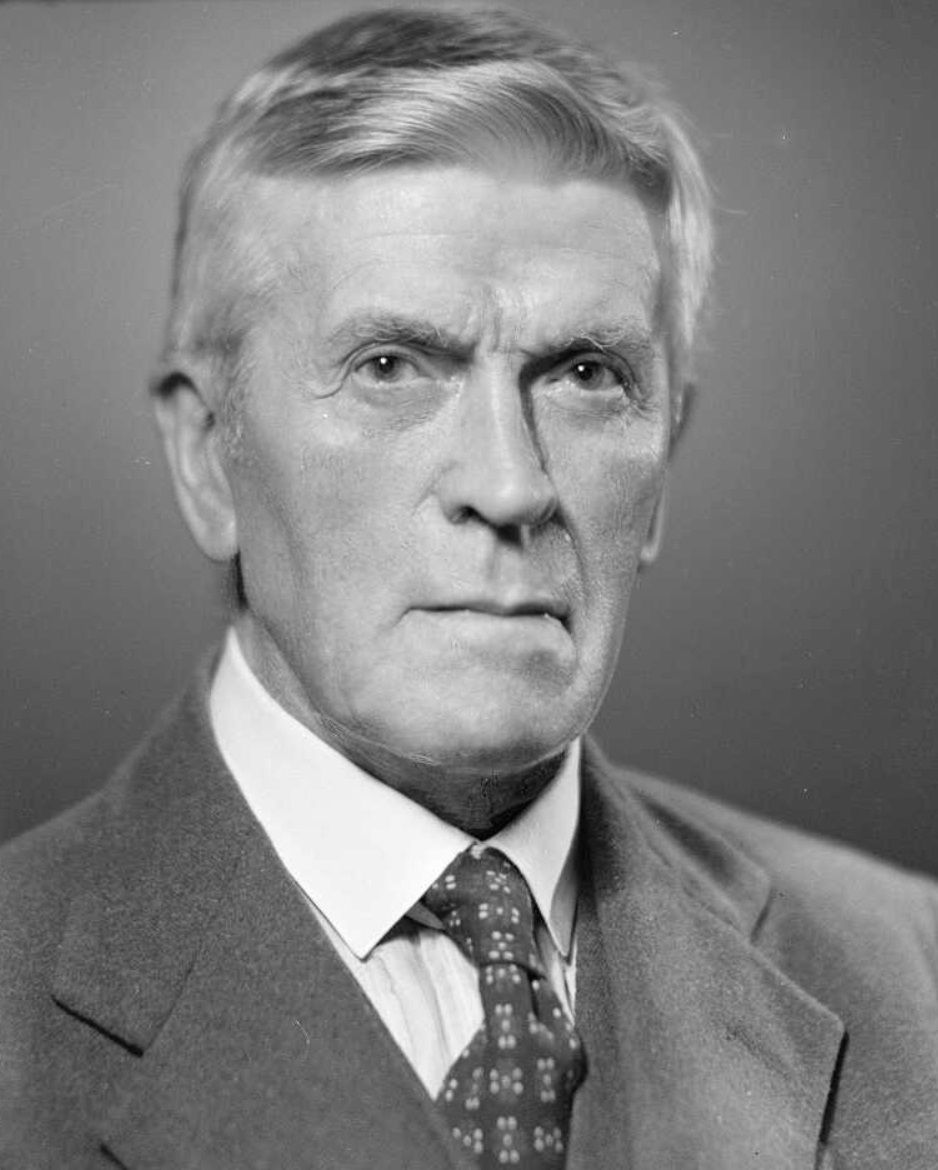
- Luckie in the 1920s

3rd Deputy Mayor of Wellington
- In office 8 October 1936 – 19 November 1947
- Mayor: Thomas Hislop; Will Appleton
- Preceded by: William Bennett
- Succeeded by: Robert Macalister
- In office 18 October 1923 – 20 May 1931
- Mayor: George Troup
- Preceded by: George Frost
- Succeeded by: William Bennett

Personal details
- Born: Martin Maxwell Fleming Luckie; 30 January 1868 Nelson, New Zealand
- Died: 3 July 1951 (aged 83) Wellington, New Zealand
- Cricket career

Cricket information
- Bowling: Slow left-arm orthodox

Domestic team information
- Years: Team
- 1891/92–1919/20: Wellington

Career statistics
Competition	First-class
Matches	2
Runs scored	22
Batting average	–
100s/50s	0/0
Top score	7*
Balls bowled	42
Wickets	2
Bowling average	21.00
5 wickets in innings	0
10 wickets in match	0
Best bowling	2/12
Catches/stumpings	2/–
- Source: Cricinfo, 15 September 2018

Martin Maxwell Fleming Luckie OBE (30 January 1868 – 3 July 1951) was a New Zealand cricketer who played two matches of first-class cricket 29 years apart – one in 1891 and the other in 1920. He became a prominent cricket administrator and a city councillor in Wellington. He was twice deputy mayor: from 1929 to 1931, and again from 1936 to 1947.

== Biography ==
=== Early life and career ===
Luckie was born on 30 January 1868 in Nelson. He worked as a barrister and solicitor in Wellington.

=== Cricket career ===
Luckie played first-class cricket for Wellington in 1891 and 1920. He was primarily a left-arm slow bowler. He played lower grade cricket when his senior days were over and did not retire from active play until he was 70 years old. He later served as President of the Wellington Cricket Association.

The Wellington City Council named Martin Luckie Park in Berhampore after him, which houses playing fields for both cricket and soccer.

=== Local politics ===
Luckie served two separate terms as a Wellington city councillor. In 1913 he won a seat on the council on a Citizens' League ticket which he was to hold until 1931 when he did not seek re-election as a councillor. That year he stood for Mayor of Wellington as an independent against Thomas Hislop. He polled well but lost. In 1933 he made a return to local-body politics and spent another spell on the council until he retired in 1947.

He stood for parliament as the Reform Party's candidate for the seat of Wellington South in the 1928 general election. He came runner-up to Labour's Robert McKeen who was likewise a city councillor.

=== Later life and death ===
In the 1948 Birthday Honours, Luckie was made an Officer of the Order of the British Empire.

Luckie died in Wellington on 3 July 1951.

== Notes ==
Political offices
Preceded by George Frost	Deputy Mayor of Wellington; 1923–1931 1936–1947	Succeeded by William Bennett
Preceded by William Bennett	Deputy Mayor of Wellington; 1923–1931 1936–1947	Succeeded by Robert Macalister
