= 1913 Wellington mayoral election =

New Zealand local election

- 30 April 1913
- Turnout: 19,490 (57.02%)
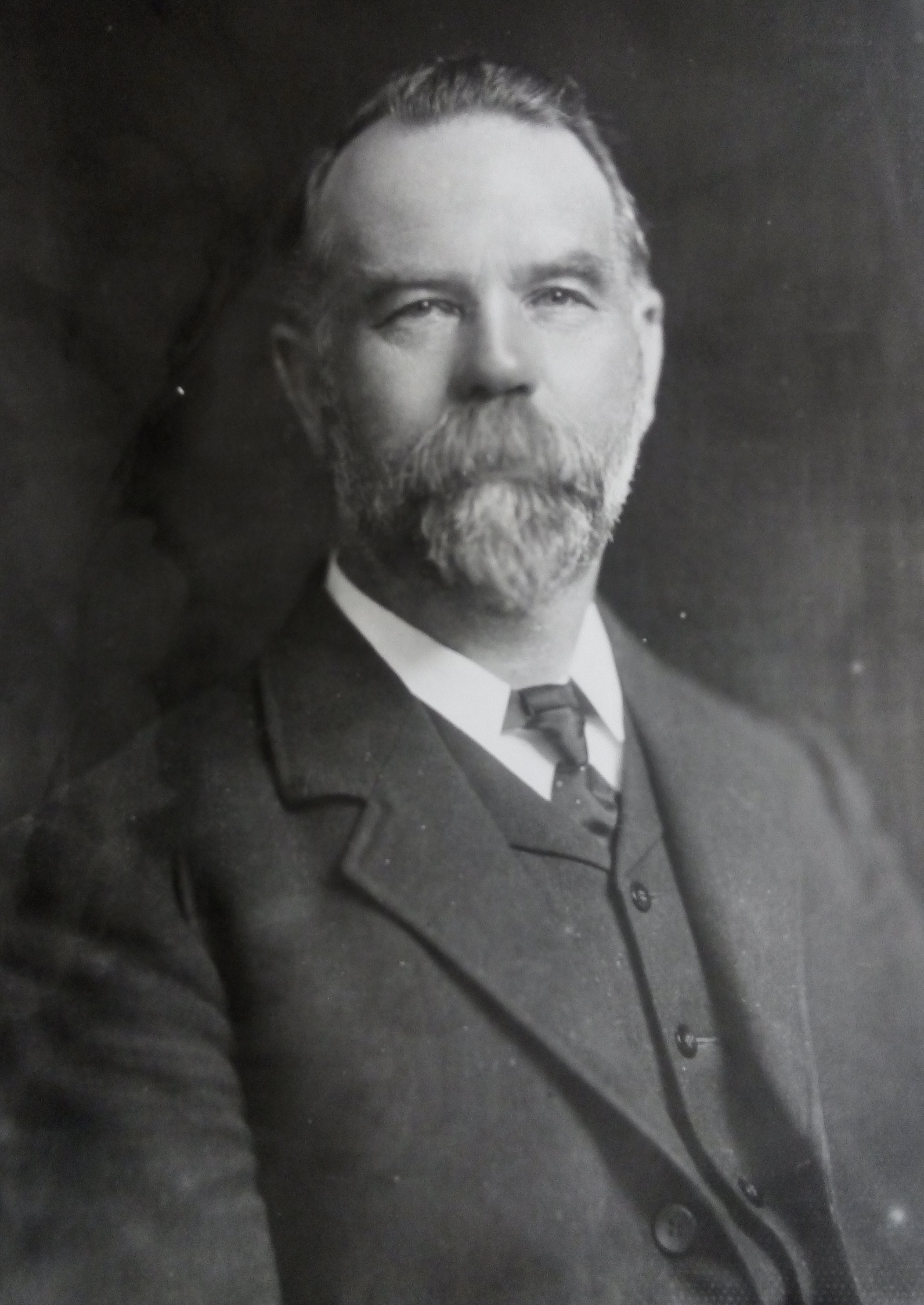

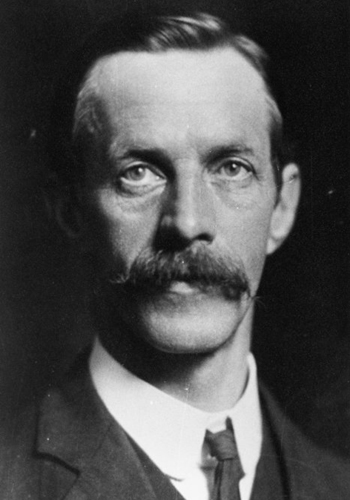
Candidate	John Luke	David McLaren
Party	Citizens League	United Labour
Popular vote	9,997	9,493
Percentage	51.29	48.71
Mayor before election
David McLaren
Elected mayor
John Luke

The 1913 Wellington mayoral election was part of the New Zealand local elections held that same year. In 1913, elections were held for the Mayor of Wellington plus other local government positions including fifteen city councillors. David McLaren, the incumbent Mayor, was defeated by John Luke by a relatively narrow margin, becoming the new Mayor of Wellington. The polling was conducted using the standard first-past-the-post electoral method.

== Background ==
Incumbent Mayor David McLaren sought a second term, opposed only by former MP John Luke. To avoid a repeat of the previous election, a conscious effort was made to ensure only a single "anti-Labour" candidate for the mayoralty. The strategy worked, although Luke's slim majority of only 500 votes coupled with the fact that McLaren's share of the vote went substantially up caused real alarm. In addition the two sitting Labour councillors were re-elected with Labour's proportion of votes increasing there as well. This confounded expectations of a strong anti-Labour backlash at the polls following the Waihi miners' strike only months before.

== Mayoralty results ==
1913 Wellington mayoral election
Party	Candidate	Votes	%	±%
Citizens League	John Luke	9,997	51.29	
United Labour	David McLaren	9,493	48.71	+7.73
Majority		504	2.58	
Turnout		19,490	57.02	+22.62

== Councillor results ==
1913 Wellington City Council election
Party	Candidate	Votes	%	±%
Independent	Robert Fletcher	10,845	55.64	−15.53
Citizens League	William Barber	10,026	51.44	−9.27
Independent	John Fuller Jr.	9,745	50.00	+5.59
Citizens League	Arthur Atkinson	9,632	49.42	+1.94
Citizens League	Robert Wright	9,296	47.69	
Citizens League	George Frost	9,253	47.47	+7.00
Citizens League	Len McKenzie	9,106	46.72	+5.93
Citizens League	Thomas Hislop	8,466	43.43	
Citizens League	James Godber	8,445	43.32	+1.68
United Labour	Alfred Hindmarsh	8,197	42.05	−10.43
Citizens League	Harry Buddle	8,139	41.75	
Citizens League	William Thompson	7,911	40.59	
Independent	John Fitzgerald	7,654	39.27	−12.96
Citizens League	Martin Luckie	7,644	39.22	
United Labour	Edward Tregear	7,639	39.19	−13.97
Independent	Falk Cohen	7,620	39.09	
Citizens League	James Trevor	7,606	39.02	−2.12
Independent	John Castle	7,357	37.74	+8.76
Independent	William Perry	7,204	36.96	
Citizens League	Thomas Neave	6,136	31.48	
United Labour	Walter Bedford	5,465	28.04	
United Labour	Elijah Carey	5,078	26.05	−6.20
United Labour	Michael Reardon	5,063	25.97	−6.19
United Labour	Andrew Hornblow	4,483	23.00	
United Labour	Tom Young	4,325	22.19	
United Labour	Charles Chapman	4,320	22.16	
Independent	John Pollock	4,285	21.98	
United Labour	William Dobson	4,014	20.59	
United Labour	Edward Kennedy	3,775	19.36	
United Labour	William Hampton	3,734	19.15	
United Labour	John Dalrymple	3,652	18.73	
Independent	Daniel Moriarty	3,247	16.65	
United Labour	William Noot	3,113	15.97	
United Labour	Solomon Gordon	3,072	15.76	
Independent	Robert Williams	2,898	14.86	
Independent	Cyril Tanner	1,298	6.65	
