= Frederick Furkert =

New Zealand engineer

Frederick William Furkert CMG (14 October 1876 – 26 September 1949) was a New Zealand engineer. He joined the Public Works Department (PWD) in 1894, and was engineer-in-chief of the PWD for twelve years from 1920 until he retired in 1933.

Furkert was born in Ross, Westland in 1876. The projects he was responsible for included the New Zealand Railways Department the North Island Main Trunk Railway (completed 1908), the Otira Tunnel (completed 1923) and the Tawa Flat deviation (completed 1935). He was also responsible for hydroelectric dam projects like the Waitaki Dam (completed 1935).

He worked with the Standards Institute on the draughting of building bylaws. In the 1926 New Year Honours, Furkert was appointed a Companion of the Order of St Michael and St George. He was a Wellington City Councillor when he died. He died in Wellington on 26 September 1949.
