= Robert Macalister =

New Zealand politician (1890–1967)

Sir Robert Macalister
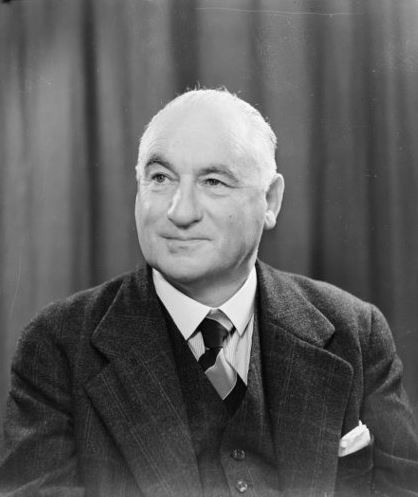

26th Mayor of Wellington
- In office 6 December 1950 – 6 December 1956
- Deputy: William Stevens (1950-53); Ernest Toop (1953-56)
- Preceded by: Will Appleton
- Succeeded by: Frank Kitts

Personal details
- Born: 2 December 1890 Blenheim, New Zealand
- Died: 23 May 1967 (aged 76) Wellington, New Zealand
- Spouse: Katherine Fitzgerald
- Education: Victoria University
- Profession: Lawyer
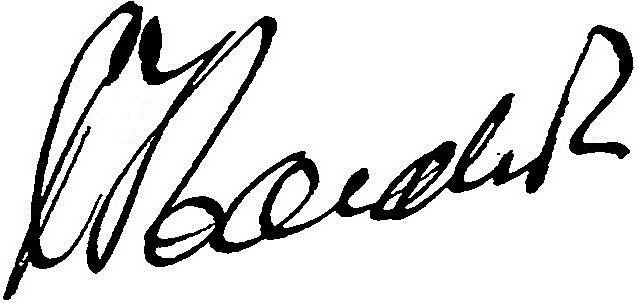
- Signature

Sir Robert Lachlan Macalister (2 December 1890 – 23 May 1967) was the Mayor of Wellington from 1950 to 1956, and had been the acting mayor for five months in 1948 during the absence overseas of Will Appleton.

== Biography ==
=== Early life and career ===
Macalister was born in Blenheim and moved to Wellington in his youth to study at Victoria University where he qualified as a Lawyer. He then enlisted in the military and served during World War I and once returning he became a member of the War Relief Association. He was a barrister and solicitor by trade and worked at the same legal firm as Ossie Mazengarb and Ernst Peterson Hay. The firm of Mazengarb, Hay and Macalister was founded in 1918 and quickly became one of the largest law practices in Wellington. In 1919 he married Katherine Featherston Fitzgerald.

=== Political career ===
In 1933 he stood for council on a Citizens' Association ticket and was narrowly elected on the first count. However, after special votes were counted he lost his seat to the Labour Party's Peter Butler. He was elected a member of the Wellington City Council in 1938. During the 1940s Wellington's town planning was coming under increasing scrutiny. Macalister notably blamed early settlers rather than the current council for the planning problems and need for urban renewal. In 1947 he was appointed deputy mayor and was the acting mayor for five months in 1948 during the absence overseas of Will Appleton.

Macalister was elected Mayor in 1950. He was also a member of the Wellington Harbour Board from 1942 to 1956. In the opinion of many officers and councillors, Macalister was conspicuous for his dynamic leadership in his co-ordination of the activities of committee chairmen and also in his ability to persuade councillors to accept his own policy preferences. He was also capable of reaching out across the floor and working with Labour councillors. As mayor he was noted for providing the city with modernised recreational facilities. During the 1951 waterfront dispute was compelled by the central government to "hold the line" against what it termed as communist subversion. Macalister's controversial powers during the dispute included helping to set up replacement unions to run the port. In mid-1951 the council rejected an application from the waterfront workers and their families for their electricity not to be disconnected for non-payment. He also acted as chairman of an Emergency Supplies Committee which was set up to ensure the provision of supplies for Wellington and adjoining districts during the dispute. In 1954 he hosted Queen Elizabeth II when she visited Wellington during her Royal Tour of New Zealand.

The 1956 mayoral election was conducted amidst a selection controversy by the Citizens' Association. Under the impression that incumbent Macalister was not intending to seek a third term as Mayor, Ernest Toop applied to gain nomination as the official Citizens' candidacy. As Toop was the only applicant he was successful. However, Macalister had intended to run for mayor again and assumed he, as incumbent, would gain automatic nomination. Undeterred, Macalister ran for mayor again as an Independent which split the Citizens' vote enabling Labour's Frank Kitts to win the mayoralty.

=== Later life and death ===
After a period of illness he died at his home in Wadestown on 23 May 1967, aged 76.

== Honours ==
In the 1956 Queen's Birthday Honours, Macalister was appointed a Knight Bachelor, in recognition of his service as mayor of Wellington. Macalister Park in Wellington and Macalister Cove in Tahuahua/Blackwood Bay are named after him. The cove is where Macalister had a holiday home.

== Notes ==
Political offices
Preceded by Will Appleton	Mayor of Wellington; 1950–1956	Succeeded by Frank Kitts
Preceded by Martin Luckie	Deputy Mayor of Wellington; 1947–1950	Succeeded by William Stevens
