= Thomas Hislop (mayor) =

New Zealand politician, lawyer, and diplomat

Thomas Hislop CMG
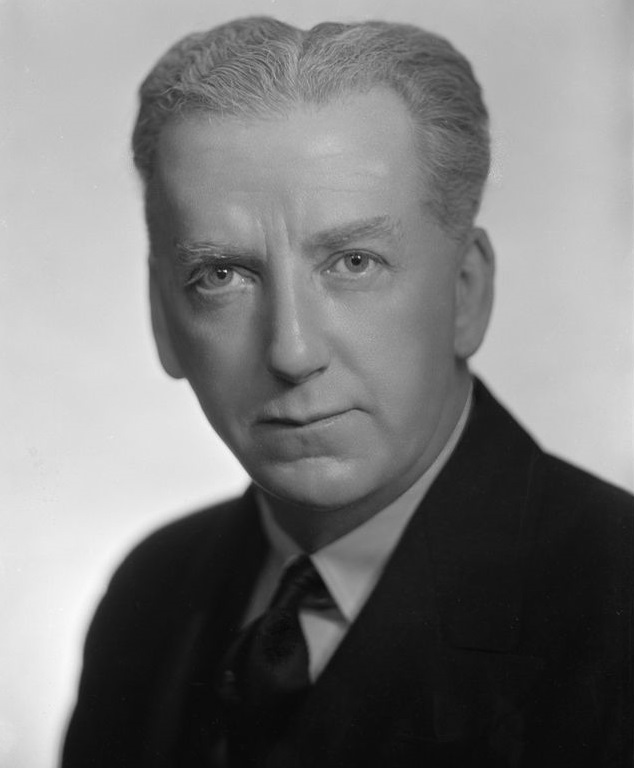

24th Mayor of Wellington
- In office 20 May 1931 – 14 June 1944
- Deputy: William Bennett (1931–36); Martin Luckie (1936–44)
- Preceded by: George Troup
- Succeeded by: Will Appleton

Personal details
- Born: Thomas Charles Atkinson Hislop; 29 November 1888 Wellington, New Zealand
- Died: 21 June 1965 (aged 76) Montreal, Quebec, Canada
- Party: National (1936–50)
- Other political affiliations: Democrat (1935–36)
- Spouse: Ailsa Craig Dalhousie Ramsay (m. 1921)
- Relations: Thomas William Hislop (father); John Hislop (grandfather)
- Education: University of Cambridge
- Profession: Lawyer

Thomas Charles Atkinson Hislop CMG (29 November 1888 – 21 June 1965) was a New Zealand politician, lawyer, and diplomat. He served as the mayor of Wellington from 1931 to 1944.

== Early life and family ==
Born in Wellington on 29 November 1888, Hislop was the son of Thomas William Hislop, who was mayor of Wellington from 1905 to 1908, and Annie Hislop (née Simpson). His grandfather was John Hislop. He attended Wellington College, and then the University of Cambridge where he graduated in law. In 1911, he was called to the bar as a barrister-at-law of Inner Temple, London.

In 1921, Hislop married Ailsa Craig Dalhousie Ramsay at St John's Church, Wellington.

== Legal and military career ==
Hislop joined the Wellington legal firm of Brandon, Ward and Hislop in 1912. He enlisted in the Wellington Regiment in World War I in 1915, and saw active service at Gallipoli and in France. He was twice wounded, and returned to New Zealand in 1919 with the rank of captain, resuming legal practice.

== Political career ==
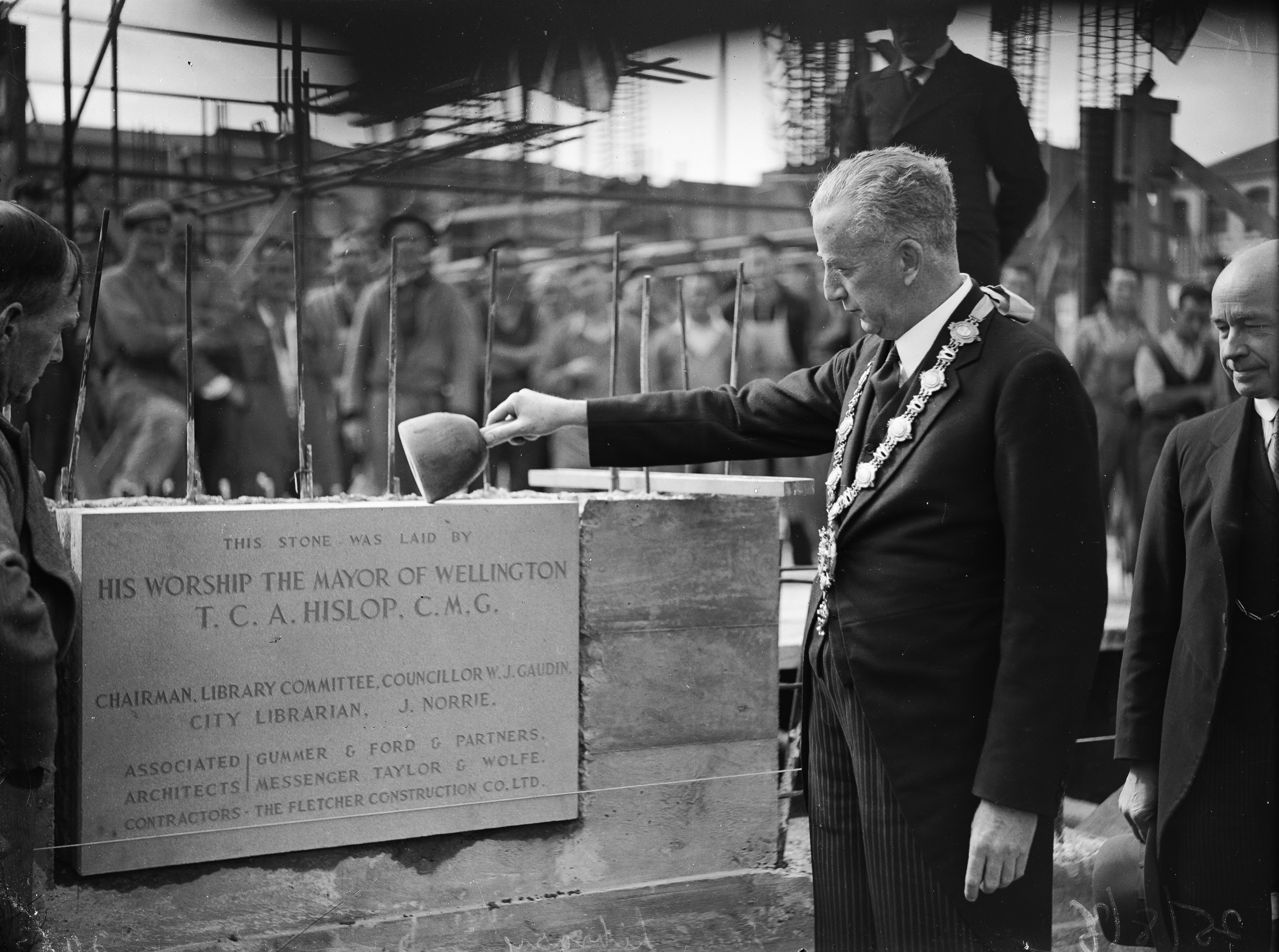
Hislop laying the foundation stone of the Wellington Public Library, 25 August 1938

Hislop was a Wellington City Councillor from 1913 to 1915, when he resigned to serve in World War I. He became a councillor again from 1927 to 1931, and then mayor from 1931 to 1944. Soon after becoming mayor the 1931 Hawke's Bay earthquake occurred. The council resolved to loan a petrol-powered shovel for a month to Napier. It also ordered a report on the safety of the bell housed in the Wellington Town Hall's clock-tower.

Controlling the city during the Great Depression it responded with financial austerity. In June 1931 the council cut salaries for council employees earning more than £5 a week. Hislop agreed to a request from the nationwide Unemployment Board to set up a voluntary local committee to run relief works in Wellington. The council provided free public transport to people on relief work schemes. By September 1932 Hislop was threatening to pull out of the Unemployment Board's scheme, arguing that with 4,033 men employed Wellington City Council was carrying a disproportionate burden. The government gave the council £20,000 to continue to employ the relief workers.

Described as an "ultra-conservative" he was a member of the New Zealand Legion and opposed the United–Reform coalition government. He was later the political leader of the Democrat Party organised by Albert Davy in 1934–35. The party was anti-socialist, but in the 1935 general election its main effect was to split the anti-Labour vote, and it disappeared soon afterwards. Hislop himself contested the Masterton electorate and came last out of three candidates. He later became a member of the new National Party which the Democrat Party had merged into. At the 1943 election standing for the National Party in the Wellington North electorate, he came second but was beaten by Labour's Charles Chapman.

Hislop was chairman of the Wellington Provincial Centennial Council and the New Zealand Centennial Exhibition Company from 1937; the Centennial was in 1940. His predecessor as mayor came up with the idea, with Hislop gaining government approval for the idea in 1936. In 1940 Noël Coward was on a world entertainment and propaganda tour, and at a mayoral reception in Wellington had a set-to with the Mayoress who seemed to me to suffer from delusions of grandeur .... She said to me in ringing tones that I was never to dare to sing "The Stately Homes of England" again as it was an insult to the homeland and that neither she or anybody else liked it. I replied coldly that for many years it had been one of my greatest successes, whereupon she announced triumphantly to everyone within earshot: 'You see – he can’t take criticism!' Irritated beyond endurance I replied that I was perfectly prepared to take intelligent criticism at any time, but I was not prepared to tolerate bad manners. With this I bowed austerely and left the party.

By World War II, Hislop was seen as a "remote, even erratic figure, and his right-wing views regularly brought him into conflict with the wartime Labour government", but the attack by some trade unionists on Hubert Nathan, a Jew and Citizens candidate for the Harbour Board, resulted in the defeat of all the Labour candidates to the Council in 1941. He strongly supported the war effort and in February 1940 he joined a crowd of several thousand people who marched to Pigeon Park to counter-protest a gathering of pacifists and conscientious objectors. Hislop (despite being aligned with the Labour government in supporting the war effort) never stopped needling members of the Labour Cabinet over its previous opposition to conscription during World War I. The government got their own back in 1942 when they refused to see a council deputation requesting state subsidies for thousands of earthquake damaged chimney pots. Labour also worked extra hard to ensure that Hislop never achieved his ambition of a parliamentary career.

Ahead of the 1944 election Hislop was openly challenged for the Citizens' mayoral candidacy by councillors Will Appleton and William Gaudin. He was again selected by a ballot of the Citizens' Electoral Committee, but Appleton said he would stand for mayor as an independent despite not being granted the Citizens' nomination in pursuance of a promise he gave to a deputation of over 100 people who implored him to stand. This caused concern for the Citizens' Association of vote splitting and a repeat of the 1912 election where competing centre-right candidates allowed a Labour mayor to be elected. Declining arbitration, Appleton got his wish after discussions when Hislop (albeit reluctantly) agreed to stand aside in the interests of unity.

Post mayoralty Hislop returned to legal practice. Ahead of the 1946 election he was nominated to stand for National in the Mount Victoria electorate. His leadership of the Democrat Party in 1935 which helped Labour win government was still a black mark against his name with National Party members and accordingly he was persuaded to withdraw from the selection process on the prediction he would not win. His age (at 58 years old) was also a factor against him.

== Honours and awards ==
In 1935, both Hislop and his wife were awarded the King George V Silver Jubilee Medal. In the 1935 King's Birthday Honours, Hislop was appointed a Companion of the Order of St Michael and St George. In 1953, he was awarded the Queen Elizabeth II Coronation Medal.

== Later life and death ==
Hislop was High Commissioner to Canada from 1950 to 1957. He died on 21 June 1965 in Montreal, Canada; where his daughter Mrs A. Gordon was living.

== Sources ==
- Betts, George (1970). Betts on Wellington: A City and its Politics. Wellington: A. H. & A. W. Reed Ltd. ISBN 0-589-00469-7.
- Perry, Stuart (1969). No Mean City. Wellington: Wellington City Council. OCLC 64449.
- Yska, Redmer (2006). Wellington: Biography of a City. Auckland: Reed Books. ISBN 9780790011172.

Political offices
Preceded by George Troup	Mayor of Wellington; 1931–1944	Succeeded by Will Appleton
Diplomatic posts
Preceded by Jim Thorn	High Commissioner to Canada; 1950–1957	Succeeded by Tom Davin
