= Berkeley Dallard =

New Zealand accountant, prison administrator

Berkeley Dallard CMG
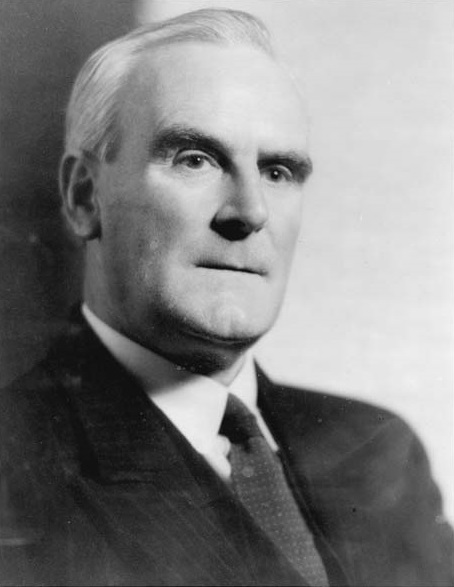

Member of the Wellington City Council
- In office 2 November 1949 – 13 October 1962
- Preceded by: Frederick Furkert
- Constituency: At-large

Personal details
- Born: 27 August 1889 Christchurch, New Zealand
- Died: 5 September 1983 (aged 94) Wellington, New Zealand
- Party: National
- Spouse: Agnes Rowand Inglis
- Children: 3
- Education: Victoria University of Wellington
- Profession: Public servant

Berkeley "Bert" Lionel Scudamore Dallard CMG (27 August 1889 – 5 September 1983) was a New Zealand accountant, senior public servant and prison administrator.

== Biography ==
=== Early life ===
He was born in Christchurch, New Zealand, on 27 August 1889, and attended Rangiora High School. He completed a junior civil service examination and in 1907 became a cadet in the Stamp Department in Wellington. He would later attend Victoria University and qualified as an accountant. By 1924 he had progressed to the position of inspector in the Office of the Public Service Commissioner. In 1926 Dallard became New Zealand's controller-general of prisons, retaining this title until 1933, when he was appointed as an under-secretary to the Department of Justice.

On 7 April 1915 he married Agnes Rowand Inglis at Auckland and had three daughters together.

=== Penal reform ===
He was active in the Howard League for Penal Reform advocating for criminal reform.

Since 1912 prisons in New Zealand had been undergoing considerable reform. However by the early 1920s there was growing concern that liberalisation of the penal system had gone too far. Dallard, a deeply conservative man, was appointed to run the prison systems in New Zealand and was made a member of the Law Revision Committee. He was particularly opposed to homosexuals, Communists and pacifists and allowed them ill-treatment. Also throughout his administration of the prison system he was a staunch supporter of sterilising mentally ill patients, flogging sex offenders and the use of the death penalty for those guilty of murderer.

In 1935, he was awarded the King George V Silver Jubilee Medal. In the 1948 King's Birthday Honours, Dallard was appointed a Companion of the Order of St Michael and St George, in recognition of his service as under-secretary of Justice.

=== Political career ===
He was a member of and office holder within the National Party. Active in the Karori branch, he was the branch's finance convener.

Dallard was a member of the Wellington City Council. He was elected in a by-election in 1949 as the Citizens' candidate to replace the deceased Frederick Furkert and held his seat until 1962 when he was defeated standing as an independent. He was also a member of the Wellington Hospital Board, and the Metropolitan Licensing Authority.

In June 1950 he became a member of the Wellington Hospital Board and remained a member until 1971 when he retired. For the 1962 to 1965 triennium he was chairman of the hospital board.

The Berkeley Dallard apartments (owned by the city council) in Nairn Street, Wellington, are named after him. In April 2019 the naming of the apartments was brought into question. Councillors Nicola Young and Fleur Fitzsimons suggested that they be renamed as Dallard's homophobic tendencies were no longer in line with popular opinion.

=== Later life and death ===
Dallard died in Wellington on 5 September 1983, aged 94 years old.

== Notes ==
Government offices
Preceded by Robert Percy Ward	Under-Secretary for Justice; 1933–1949	Succeeded by Sam Barnett
Political offices
Preceded by Arthur Carman	Chair of Wellington Hospital Board; 1962–1965	Succeeded by Gilbert MacLean
