= Jim Bateman =

New Zealand politician and educationalist

Jim Bateman OBE
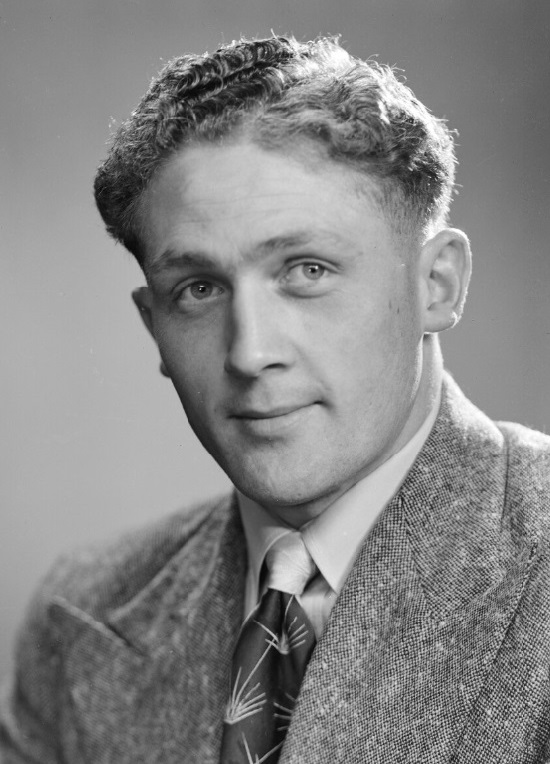

16th Vice-President of the Labour Party
- In office 12 May 1964 – 11 May 1966
- Preceded by: Norman Kirk
- Succeeded by: Henry May
- In office 8 June 1960 – 7 May 1963
- Preceded by: Martyn Finlay
- Succeeded by: Norman Kirk

Member of the Wellington City Council
- In office 31 October 1953 – 13 October 1962
- Constituency: At-large

Personal details
- Born: 5 April 1925
- Died: 20 October 1987 (aged 62) Wellington, New Zealand
- Party: Labour
- Children: 3
- Education: Victoria University of Wellington
- Profession: Teacher

James Alder Bateman OBE (5 April 1925 – 20 October 1987) was a New Zealand politician and educationalist.

== Biography ==
=== Early life and career ===
In 1949, Bateman graduated from Victoria University College with a Master of Arts in philosophy and Diploma of Education. After graduating he began a career in teaching and taught at Wellington High School, later becoming first assistant Principal. Bateman was to later serve as founding Principal of the Central Institute of Technology from 1968 to 1985. He was elected president of the Technical Institutes Association in October 1974. As president he represented the collective interests of all thirteen of New Zealand's technical institutes in terms of their policy and growth.

Bateman joined the Labour Party in 1940. His father had been personal secretary to prominent Labour politicians Peter Fraser and Walter Nash.

=== Political career ===
Bateman stood for the Karori electorate in the New Zealand House of Representatives in the 1951 and 1954 general elections for the Labour Party. He was unsuccessful placing second on both occasions. Bateman later contested the Labour Party nomination for the Heretaunga seat in 1960 which resulted in a deadlock in the selection committee between himself and union organiser Ron Bailey. As a result of the deadlock the matter was referred to the party national executive. Ultimately, Bateman was unsuccessful.

He was a long-serving member of the Labour Party, deeply involved at its organisational level. He sat for many years on Labour's National Executive, and twice served as the party's Vice-President. Bateman proved to be an effective administrator particularly as he was free from the maelstrom of party politics which other party office holders (who were mostly MPs) were subject to. Bateman stood for President in 1964 on the retirement of Martyn Finlay but was beaten by Norman Kirk by 401 votes to 106.

In 1953 Bateman won a seat on the Wellington City Council on a Labour ticket, aged only 28 he was the youngest councillor elected for decades. He held a seat for three terms until 1962 when he decided not to seek re-election. On the council he chaired the staff committee. Upon his retirement from the council, Bateman cited the increasing amount of time required to participate in council and balancing that with his career and family as the reason for his early withdrawal (aged only 37).

Bateman later became a member of the Wellington Harbour Board, which met less frequently. He was elected in 1965 and served three years on the board until 1968.

In 1979 he was awarded a gold badge for long service to the Labour Party.

=== Later life and death ===
He was a member of the Winston Churchill Memorial Trust board until retiring in 1982. In the 1986 New Year Honours, Bateman was appointed an Officer of the Order of the British Empire, in recognition of his service as principal of Central Institute of Technology.

Bateman died in Wellington of cancer on 20 October 1987, aged 62 years, and his ashes were buried at Karori Cemetery. He was survived by his wife and their three children.

== Citations ==
Party political offices
Preceded by Martyn Finlay	Vice-President of the Labour Party; 1960–1963 1964–1966	Succeeded by Norman Kirk
Preceded by Norman Kirk	Vice-President of the Labour Party; 1960–1963 1964–1966	Succeeded by Henry May
