= Ernest Toop =

New Zealand politician and businessman

Ernest Toop CBE JP
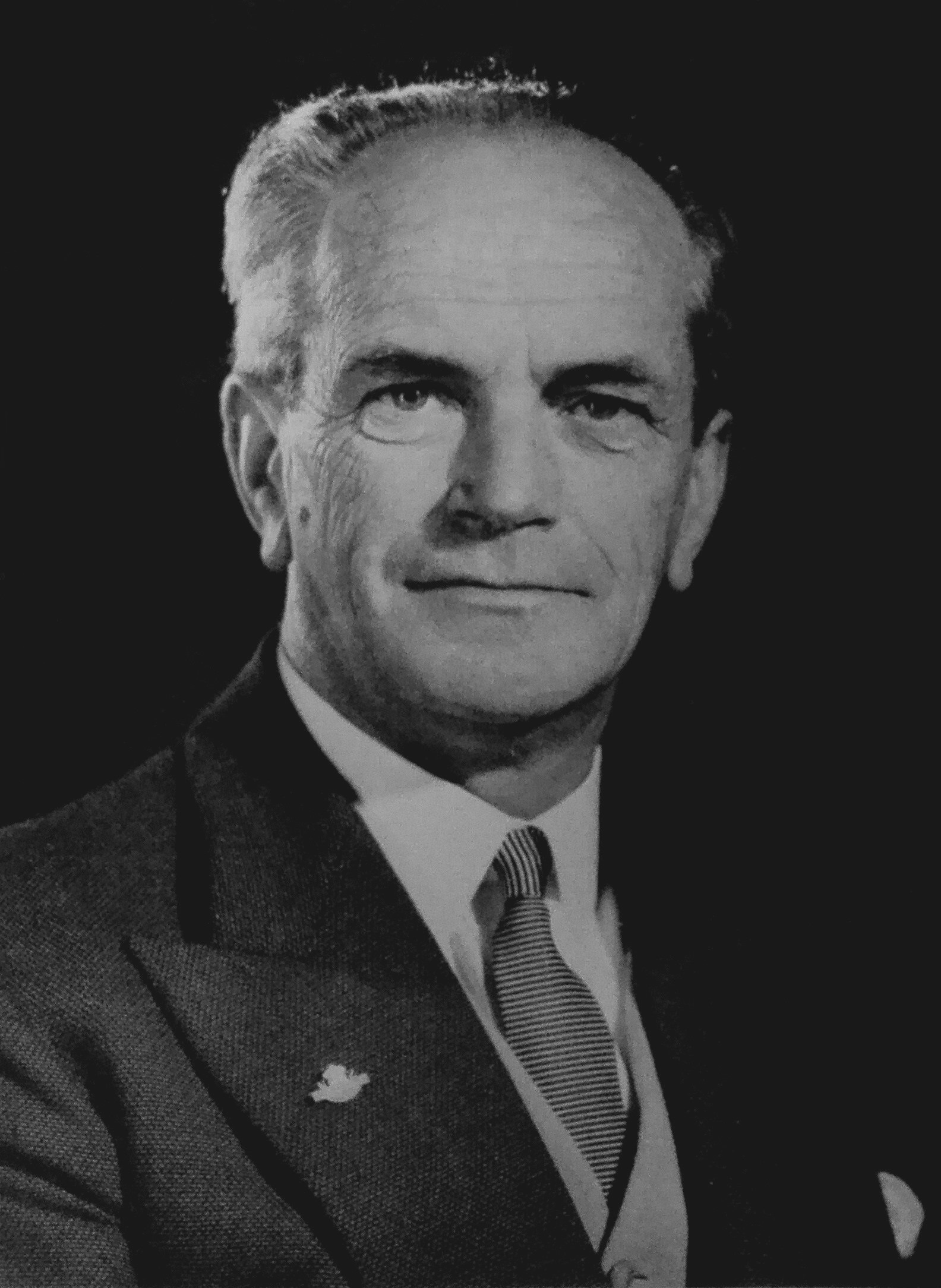

33rd Chair of Wellington Harbour Board
- In office 1961–1966
- Preceded by: Brian Edwin Keiller
- Succeeded by: Barry Barton-Ginger

7th Deputy Mayor of Wellington
- In office 1953–1956
- Mayor: Robert Macalister
- Preceded by: William Stevens
- Succeeded by: Harry Nankervis

Personal details
- Born: 3 October 1895 Clifton, England
- Died: 14 November 1976 (aged 81) Wellington, New Zealand
- Party: National
- Spouse(s): Vera Wright (m.1925); Merle Gamble (m.1970)

Ernest Richard Toop CBE JP (3 October 1895 – 14 November 1976) was a New Zealand politician and businessman.

== Biography ==
=== Early life ===
Ernest Richard Toop was born in 1895. He became a merchant in Wellington starting his own company, becoming the managing director of the firm of Toop and Neilson, Ltd. He was the president of the Island Bay branch of the Returned Services' Association.

=== Political career ===
Toop stood as the National Party's candidate for the seat of Wellington South in the 1943 general election. He came runner-up to Labour's Robert McKeen. Toop was first elected to the Wellington City Council in 1944 on the ticket of the right-leaning Citizens' Association. He would remain a councillor until 1956. He served as the Deputy Mayor from 1953 to 1956 under Robert Macalister. In 1956 Toop was elected to the Wellington Harbour Board. He served on the board for the next 18 years including 5 years as the chair from 1961 to 1966.

In 1953, Toop was awarded the Queen Elizabeth II Coronation Medal.

In 1956 Toop became embroiled in a selection controversy. Under the impression that incumbent mayor Robert Macalister was not intending to seek a third term as mayor, Toop applied to gain nomination as the Citizens' mayoral candidate. As the only applicant he was successful. However, Macalister had intended to run again and thought that he, as the incumbent, held automatic nomination. Undeterred, Macalister ran for mayor again in 1956 as an Independent which split the Citizens' vote enabling Labour's Frank Kitts to win the mayoralty. Toop ran for mayor again in 1959 in a two-horse race against Kitts, but was again unsuccessful.

=== Later life and death ===
In the 1965 New Year Honours, Toop was appointed a Commander of the Order of the British Empire, for services to local government. He died in 1976, and was survived by his second wife.

== Notes ==
Political offices
Preceded by William Stevens	Deputy Mayor of Wellington; 1953–1956	Succeeded by Harry Nankervis
Preceded by Brian Edwin Keiller	Chair of Wellington Harbour Board; 1961–1966	Succeeded by Barry Barton-Ginger
