= 2001 Wellington City Council election =

Local election in New Zealand

- 13 October 2001
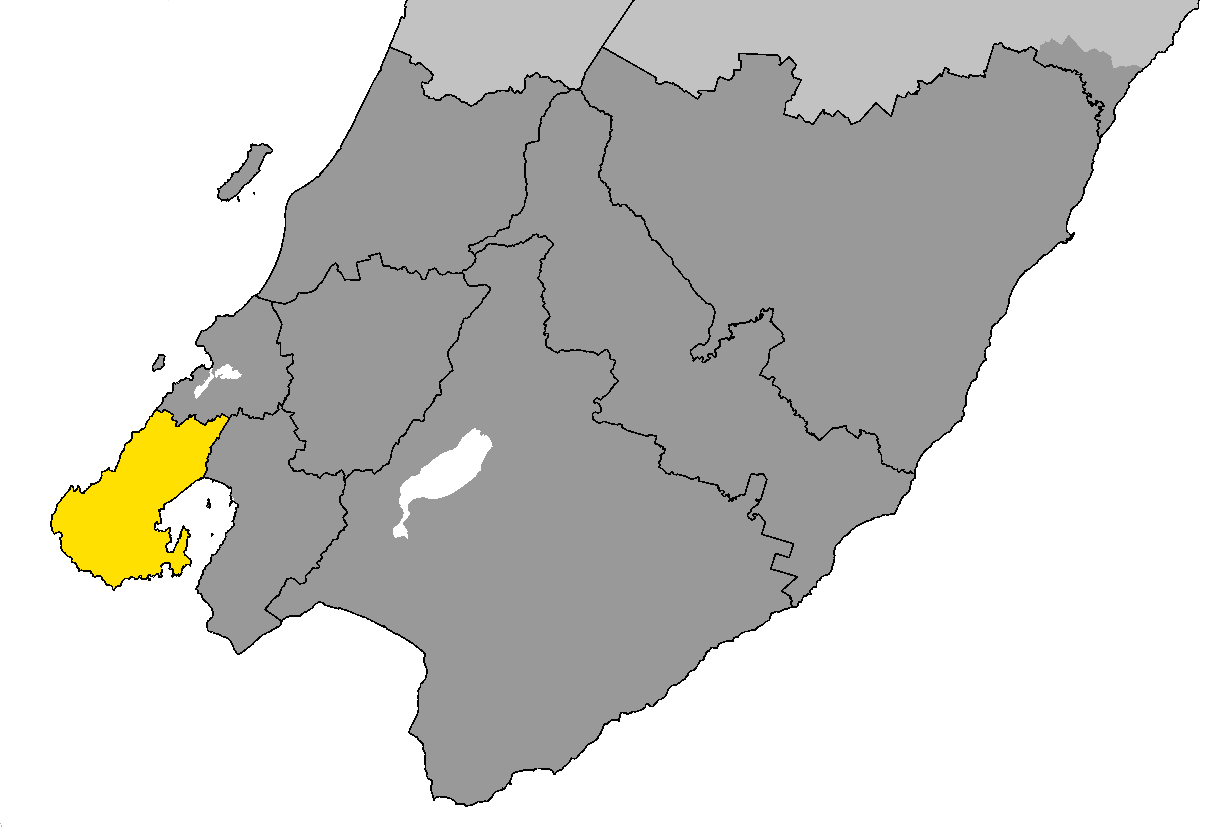
- Position of Wellington City within Wellington Region

The 2001 Wellington City Council election was part of the 2001 New Zealand local elections, to elect members to sub-national councils and boards.

== Council ==
The Wellington City Council consisted of a mayor and nineteen councillors elected from six wards (Northern, Onslow, Western, Lambton, Eastern, Southern) using the First-past-the-post voting system.

=== Mayor ===
2001 Wellington mayoral election
Party	Candidate	Votes	%	±%
Independent	Kerry Prendergast	19,782	33.73	
Green	Mary Varnham	11,097	18.92	
Independent	John Morrison	10,289	17.54	
Independent	Andy Foster	3,982	6.79	
Alliance	Stephanie Cook	3,648	6.22	−16.24
Independent	Merepeka Raukawa-Tait	3,174	5.41	
Independent	Rob Goulden	1,827	3.11	
Independent	Bryan Pepperell	1,714	2.92	−9.95
Independent	Ollie Tafua	745	1.27	
Independent	Kent Clark	693	1.18	
Independent	Lindsay Milkop	290	0.49	
Independent	Josie Bullock	259	0.44	
Independent	Hugh Baker-Boyd	134	0.22	−2.16
Independent	Thomas Morgan	134	0.22	
Informal votes		874	1.49	
Majority		8,685	14.81	
Turnout		58,642	47.78	−0.68
Registered electors		122,730		

=== Eastern ward ===
The Eastern ward returned four councillors to the Wellington City Council. The final results for the ward were:

Eastern Ward (4 vacancies)
Party	Candidate	Votes	%	±%
Independent	Ray Ahipene-Mercer	5,442	46.71	+13.59
Labour	Leonie Gill	5,320	45.66	+4.98
Independent	Rob Goulden	4,121	35.37	−3.08
Independent	David Major	3,517	30.18	
Labour	Peter Benson	3,307	28.38	
Labour	Daran Ponter	3,053	26.20	
Independent	Linda Hobman	2,898	24.87	+6.45
Independent	Cliff Condren	2,330	20.00	
Independent	Phil Sprey	2,040	17.51	+15.93
Independent	Tafa Max To'o	1,899	16.30	
Independent	Ollie Tafua	1,750	15.02	
Independent	Josie Bullock	1,512	12.97	
Independent	Sean Woods	1,471	12.62	
Independent	Karuna Muthu	608	5.21	
Informal votes		441	3.78	+3.49
Majority		210	1.80	
Turnout		11,650	50.61	+12.11
Registered electors		23,019		

=== Lambton ward ===
The Lambton ward returned four councillors to the Wellington City Council. The final results for the ward were:

Lambton Ward (4 vacancies)
Party	Candidate	Votes	%	±%
Alliance	Stephanie Cook	5,531	50.18	+5.50
Labour	David Zwartz	4,188	38.00	
Independent	Alick Shaw	3,872	35.13	
Independent	Chris Parkin	3,670	33.30	−6.22
Independent	Jo Couglan	3,643	33.05	
Green	Brent Efford	2,895	26.26	
Independent	John Gibbons	1,985	18.01	
Independent	Alan Whiting	1,746	15.84	
Independent	John Shrapnell	1,738	15.76	
Independent	Yadana Saw	1,712	15.53	
Independent	Joy Dunsheath	1,525	13.83	
Legalise Cannabis	Michael Appleby	1,208	10.96	+2.06
Independent	David Scott	1,121	10.17	
Independent	Kirk MacGibbon	998	9.05	
Independent	Ari Roskam	793	7.19	
Independent	Lindsay Milkop	744	6.75	
Informal votes		480	4.35	
Majority		27	0.24	
Turnout		11,021	42.05	+2.25
Registered electors		26,204		

=== Northern ward ===
The Northern ward returned four councillors to the Wellington City Council. The final results for the ward were:

Northern Ward (4 vacancies)
Party	Candidate	Votes	%	±%
Independent	Helene Ritchie	6,260	49.74	+9.24
Three 4 North	Ian Hutchings	6,091	48.40	+1.92
Three 4 North	Ngaire Best	5,729	45.52	
Three 4 North	Robert Armstrong	5,550	44.10	+7.92
Northern Merit	Kent Clark	4,475	35.56	+9.52
Northern Merit	Ray Good	3,793	30.14	
Northern Merit	Jim Candolitis	3,059	24.31	
Independent	John Taylor	3,025	24.04	
Independent	Gay Limpus	2,472	19.64	
Independent	Hugh Baker Boyd	1,239	9.84	−0.81
Informal votes		701	5.57	
Majority		1,075	8.54	
Turnout		12,583	47.78	+2.05
Registered electors		26,333		

=== Onslow ward ===
The Onslow ward returned two councillors to the Wellington City Council. The final results for the ward were:

Onslow Ward (2 vacancies)
Party	Candidate	Votes	%	±%
Independent	Judy Siers	4,571	72.65	+20.96
Independent	John Morrison	3,755	59.68	
Independent	Darryl Ray	1,852	29.43	
Informal votes		518	8.23	
Majority		1,903	30.24	
Turnout		6,291	53.41	+3.75
Registered electors		11,778		

=== Southern ward ===
The Southern ward returned three councillors to the Wellington City Council. The final results for the ward were:

Southern Ward (3 vacancies)
Party	Candidate	Votes	%	±%
Green	Celia Wade-Brown	4,639	48.45	
Independent	Sue Piper	4,035	42.14	−13.82
Independent	Bryan Pepperell	3,782	39.50	−0.25
Labour	Hola Taue	3,477	36.32	
Independent	Matt Taylor	3,086	32.23	+0.73
Independent	Evan Keay	1,674	17.48	
Independent	Ash Bhasin	1,485	15.51	
Independent	Duncan Mackay	1,464	15.29	
Independent	Harry Muagututi'a Tauafiafi	898	9.38	
Informal votes		396	4.13	
Majority		2,612	27.28	
Turnout		9,573	46.30	+4.79
Registered electors		20,675		

=== Western ward ===
The Western ward returned two councillors to the Wellington City Council. The final results for the ward were:

Western Ward (2 vacancies)
Party	Candidate	Votes	%	±%
Independent	Andy Foster	5,731	76.16	+16.77
Independent Citizens	Sally Baber	2,483	33.00	
Independent	Heather Roy	2,449	32.54	
Independent	Haydn Nicholls	1,468	19.51	
Independent	Craig Wylie	730	9.70	+1.45
Informal votes		490	6.51	
Majority		34	0.45	
Turnout		7,524	51.11	+3.99
Registered electors		14,721		

== Other local elections ==
=== Wellington Regional Council - Wellington Ward ===
The Wellington ward returns five councillors to the Wellington Regional Council.

Wellington Ward (5 vacancies)
Party	Candidate	Votes	%	±%
Independent	Chris Laidlaw	31,361	70.71	+4.79
Independent	Hugh Barr	22,829	51.47	
Independent	Judith Aitken	22,162	49.97	
Labour	Terry McDavitt	20,926	47.18	−3.60
Independent	Irvine Yardley	20,497	46.21	
Independent	Michael Gibson	15,201	34.27	−2.37
Labour	Robin Boldarin	14,214	32.04	
Labour	Kevin Burrows	13,419	30.25	
Independent	Martyn Turner	12,719	28.67	−7.29
Green	Paul Bruce	10,782	24.31	
Independent	Derek Milne	7,564	17.05	
Alliance	Russell Taylor	7,502	16.91	
Independent	Rosamund Averton	5,932	13.37	
Independent	Steve Cardno	5,256	11.85	
Independent	Al McWhinnie	4,678	10.54	
McGillicuddy Serious	Vince Terreni	3,740	8.43	
Independent	Ivan Brody-Solt	2,966	6.68	
Majority		5,296	11.94	
Turnout		44,350	36.13	+0.25
Registered electors		122,730		
