= 1986 Wellington mayoral election =

New Zealand local election

- 11 October 1986
- Turnout: 37,311 (41.77%)
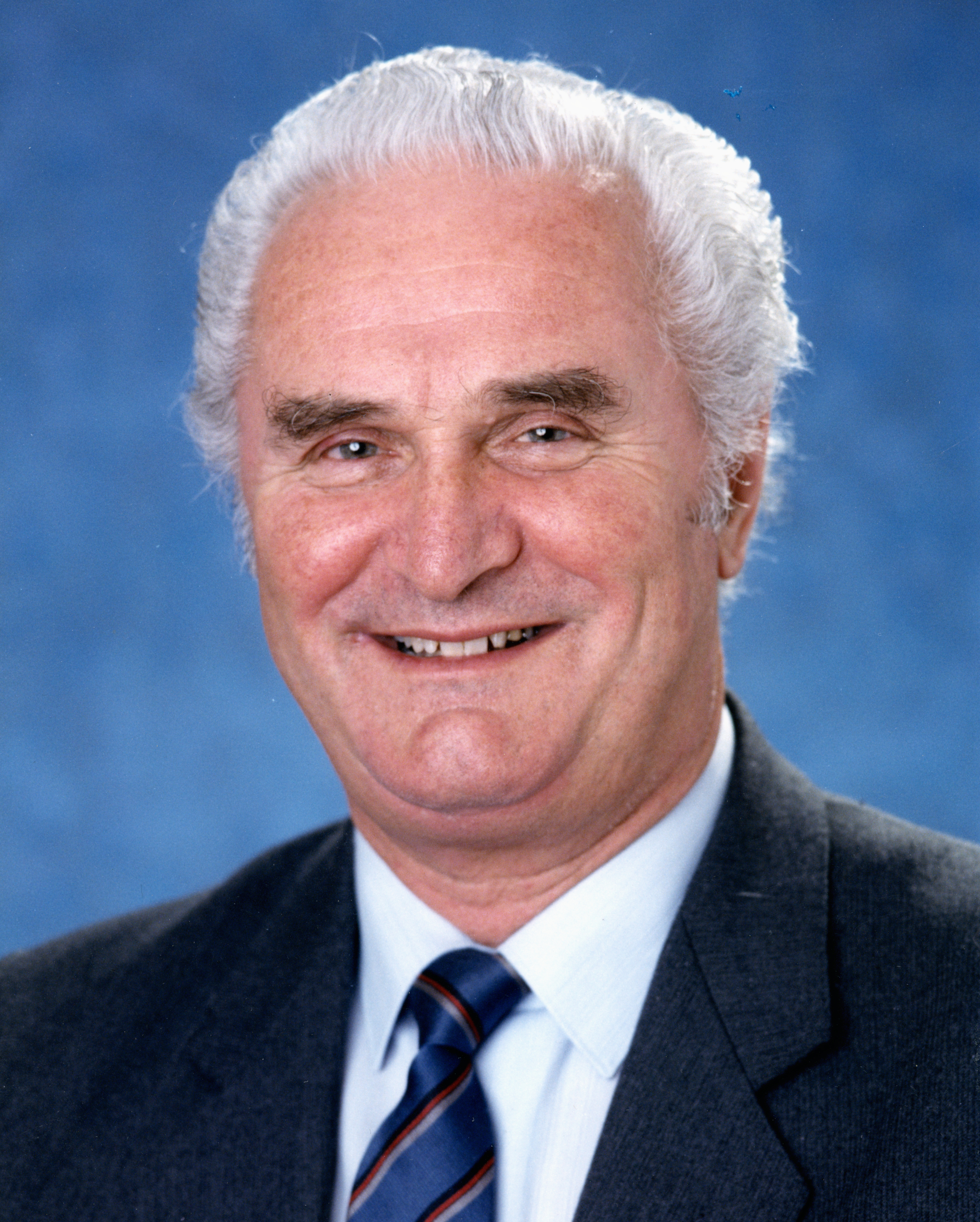

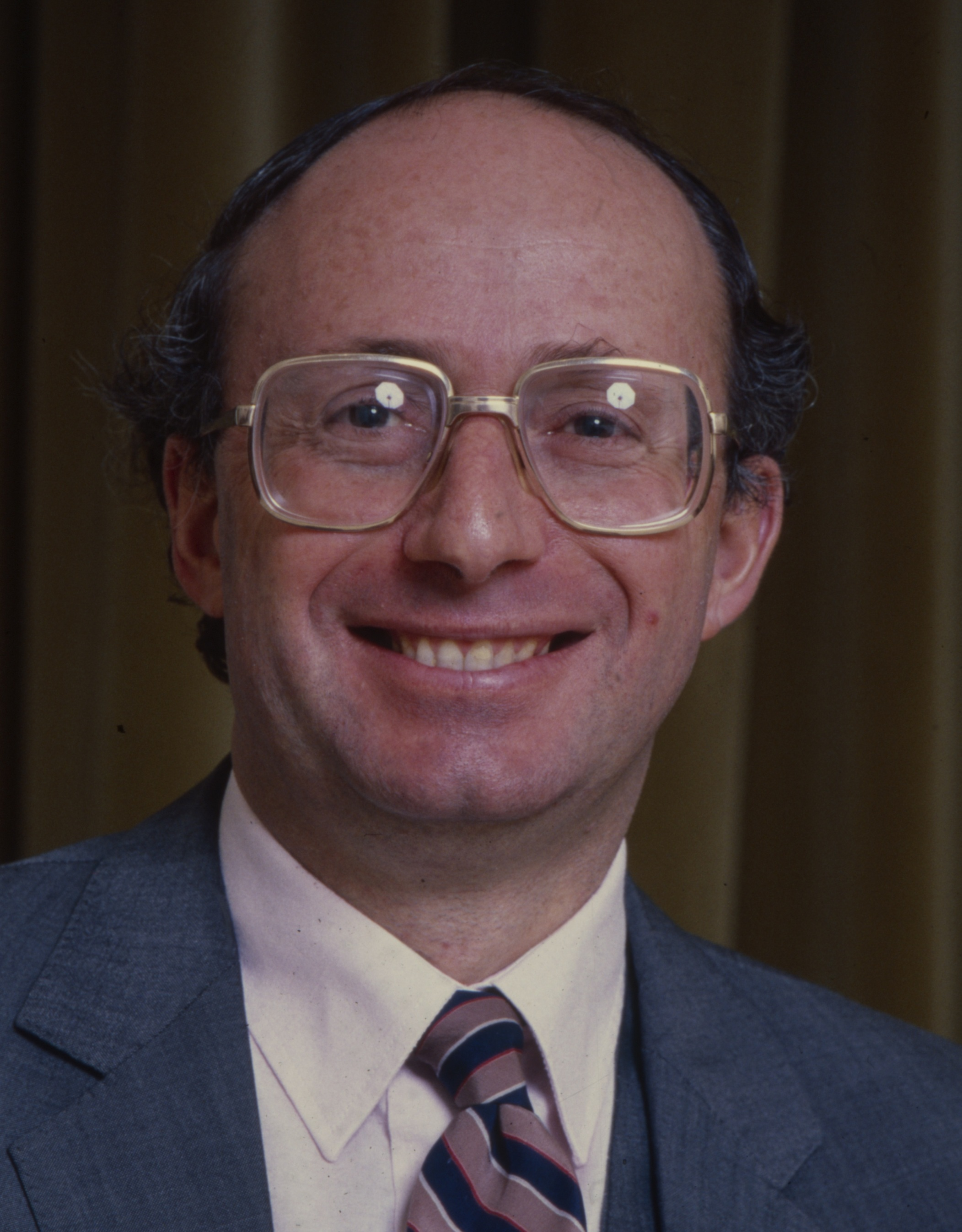
Candidate	Jim Belich	Ian Lawrence
Party	Labour	Citizens'
Popular vote	18,873	16,519
Percentage	50.58	44.27
Mayor before election
Ian Lawrence
Elected mayor
Jim Belich

The 1986 Wellington mayoral election was part of the New Zealand local elections held that same year. In 1986, elections were held for the Mayor of Wellington plus other local government positions including twenty-one city councillors. The polling was conducted using the standard first-past-the-post electoral method.

== Background ==
The election saw one-term Mayor Ian Lawrence defeated by local advertising agent Jim Belich. 1986 also saw the Labour Party win their first ever majority of seats on the Council. Electoral reforms were implemented at the 1986 municipal elections, the method of electing councillors at large which had been used since 1901 was replaced with a ward system of local electoral districts.

A major issue faced by the council during the term was the increasingly unpopular practice of raw sewage discharge into the sea. The two main candidates, Lawrence and Belich, had been friends for nearly twenty years adding a more personal element to the election than normal. The two had first met in the late-1960s when Lawrence, as a member of the Jaycees, helped organise a fundraising international ball for a UNICEF, which Belich was president of. Both agreed to a "peace pact" to fight fair in the election. Highlighting the unpopular council sewage scheme both the Labour Party and the Wellington Clean Water Campaign ran a hostile ad campaign against Lawrence and the Citizens' Association. Lawrence responded, stressing that the sewage scheme was a collective decision of the council, not a personal decision of his. In the last week of the campaign Labour launched a series of particularly controversial advertisements on Lawrence and the council. One newspaper ad showed a toilet on the beach, linking to the clean water campaign to stop raw sewage discharge at Moa Point. Lawrence was angered by the attack which reneged on a pact between the two to fight fair. Belich professed that he did not intend for any personal offence.

Ultimately Belich defeated Lawrence by over 2,000 votes, a significant turnaround from Lawrence's 8,000 vote win in 1983. The sewage issue was key to the result which Lawrence said he was both surprised and disappointed that voters judged him on that issue alone. He was also critical of the amount of campaign spending on advertising, with his opponents spending more than double what he did. The hostility of the sewage ads left him feeling bitter, but did not blame Belich personally.

== Results ==
The following table gives the election results:

1986 Wellington mayoral election
Party	Candidate	Votes	%	±%
Labour	Jim Belich	18,873	50.58	
Citizens'	Ian Lawrence	16,519	44.27	+4.97
Independent	Norm Thomas	1,344	3.60	
McGillicuddy Serious	Mark Servian	260	0.69	
Private Enterprise	Frank Moncur	251	0.67	+0.27
Informal votes		294	0.78	+0.16
Majority		2,354	6.30	
Turnout		37,017	41.77	+4.18
Registered electors		89,328		

== Ward results ==
Candidates were also elected from wards to the Wellington City Council.

Party/ticket	Councillors
Labour	11
Citizens'	9
Independent	1
