= Ian Lawrence (mayor) =

New Zealand mayor

Ian Lawrence CBE
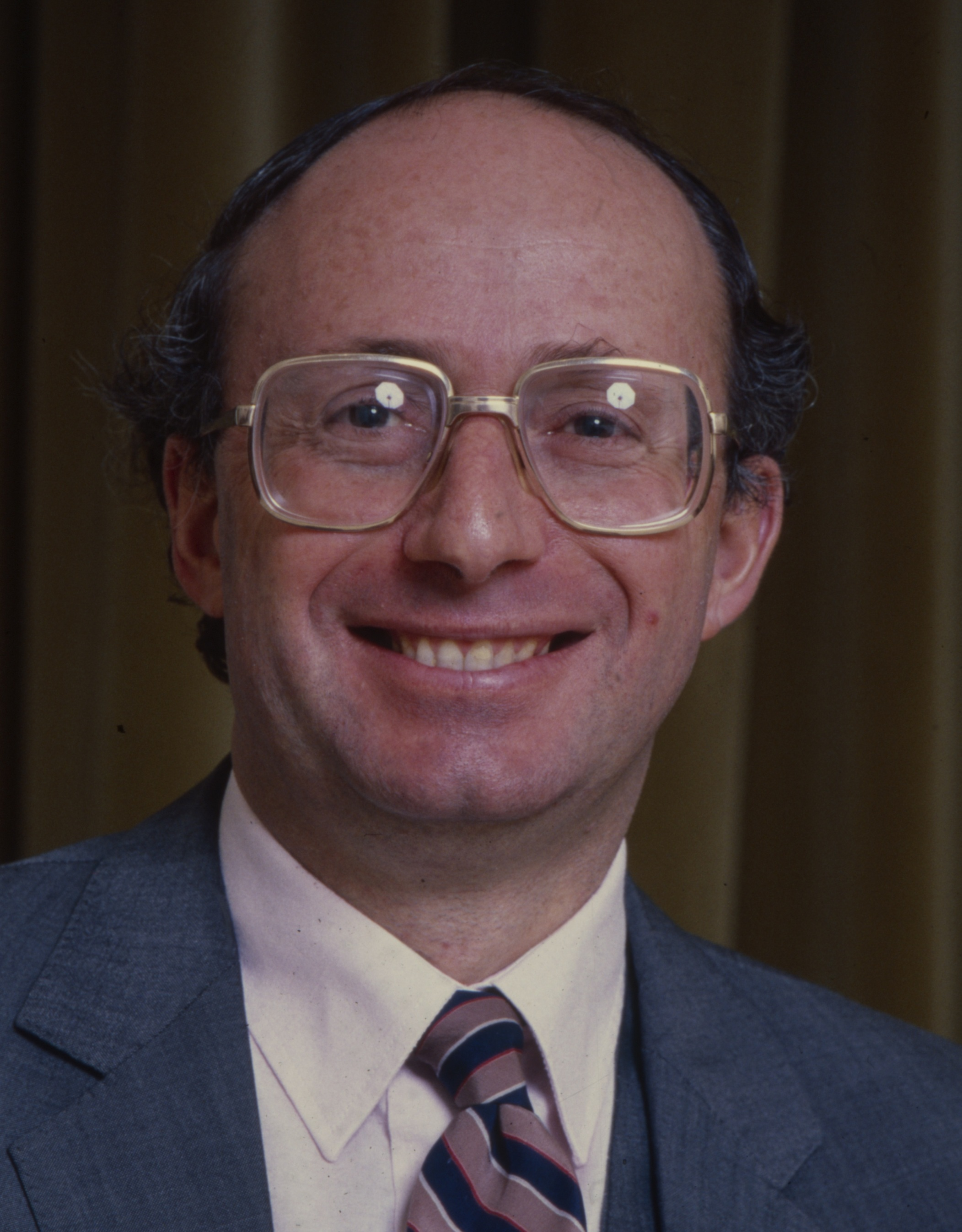
- Lawrence in 1983

29th Mayor of Wellington
- In office 26 October 1983 – 30 October 1986
- Deputy: Gavin Wilson
- Preceded by: Michael Fowler
- Succeeded by: Jim Belich

15th Deputy Mayor of Wellington
- In office 13 November 1974 – 26 October 1983
- Mayor: Michael Fowler
- Preceded by: John Jeffries
- Succeeded by: Gavin Wilson

Personal details
- Born: 29 December 1937 Sydney, New South Wales, Australia
- Died: 8 March 2019 (aged 81) Jerusalem
- Citizenship: New Zealander
- Spouse: Sandra Lawrence
- Children: 5
- Education: University of Sydney; Victoria University
- Profession: Lawyer

Ian William Lawrence CBE (29 December 1937 – 8 March 2019) was a New Zealand lawyer, who served as the mayor of Wellington from 1983 to 1986.

== Biography ==
=== Early life and career ===
Lawrence was born in Sydney, New South Wales, Australia, on 29 December 1937. As a youth, he was an active member of the Boy Scouts. He was educated at North Sydney Boys High School before proceeding to study law at the University of Sydney before moving to Wellington with his parents in 1958 and continuing his education at Victoria University College, graduating in 1960 with a Bachelor of Laws.

He became heavily involved in the Wellington Jewish community, as were his parents, carrying out a lot of pro bono work for people, charities, and other organisations he believed in. Often giving legal advice freely and was honorary solicitor for the Wellington Jewish Centre. He was chairperson of the United Israel Appeal and as a trustee of Moriah College. For many years he was Chairman of the Jewish Community Centre which together with the Synagogue became the hub of Jewish life. In 1972, Lawrence was naturalised as a New Zealand citizen.

As a trained lawyer, Lawrence worked in several New Zealand firms. He was the senior partner at law firm Johnston & Lawrence. He practised mainly in commercial law. Early on in his career he did do court work and rather enjoyed the cut and thrust argument of jury trials, leading him towards politics.

=== Political career ===
Lawrence was elected as a Wellington City Councillor on a Citizens' ticket in 1971. Initially he was unsuccessful, finishing sixteenth for the fifteen positions available. However, following the counting of special votes, he superseded the fifteenth highest (and last successful) polling candidate, Labour's Joe Aspell, after a 23-vote gap became a 17-vote lead. After the 1974 election he was appointed to the post of deputy mayor after being shoulder tapped by new mayor Michael Fowler. A surprise choice for a councillor of only three years, he was elected in preference to Labour councillor Keith Spry who was much more experienced for the role, having been a member of almost every council committee and had been a committee chairman. He was deputy mayor for nine years and when in 1982 Fowler announced his intention to not retire at the following year's election, Lawrence was selected to replace him as the Citizens' candidate for mayor. In 1977, Lawrence was awarded the Queen Elizabeth II Silver Jubilee Medal.

He remained a councillor and deputy mayor until 1983 when he was elected mayor, replacing the retiring Fowler. Given Lawrence's quiet style and low profile compared to his mayoral rival, Labour's Helene Ritchie, who had a more marked public reputation, most commentators and pollsters were predicting a very close result. The eventual outcome was a surprise to many with Lawrence winning by a margin exceeding 8,000 votes, with media dubbing him "Landslide Lawrence". Lawrence spent much time attracting major events to Wellington; he brought the Nissan Mobil 500 street car race and established New Zealand Festival. He was also aware of the increasing role the council was playing in both recreation and tourism and was interested in making a bid for Wellington to host the 1986 Commonwealth Games.

A major issue faced by the council was the increasingly unpopular practice of raw sewage discharge into the sea. Lawrence's main opponent in his 1986 re-election bid was local advertising agent Jim Belich who stood for the Labour Party. Lawrence and Belich had been friends for nearly twenty years adding a more personal element to the election than normal. The two first met in the late-1960s when Lawrence, as a member of the Jaycees, helped organise a fundraising international ball for a UNICEF, which Belich was president of. Both agreed to a "peace pact" to fight fair in the election. Highlighting the unpopular council sewage scheme both the Labour Party and the Wellington Clean Water Campaign ran a hostile ad campaign against Lawrence and the Citizens' Association. Lawrence responded, stressing that the sewage scheme was a collective decision of the council, not a personal decision of his. In the last week of the campaign Labour launched a series of particularly controversial advertisements on Lawrence and the council. One newspaper ad showed a toilet on the beach, linking to the clean water campaign to stop raw sewage discharge at Moa Point. Lawrence was angered by the attack which reneged on a pact between the two to fight fair. Belich professed that he did not intend for any personal offence.

Ultimately Lawrence lost to Belich by over 2,000 votes, a significant turnaround from his 8,000 vote victory three years earlier. The sewage issue was key to his defeat to which he said he was both surprised and disappointed that voters judged him on that issue alone. He was also critical of the amount of campaign spending on advertising, with his opponents spending more than double what he did. The hostility of the sewage ads left him feeling bitter, but did not blame Belich personally.

As a result of his loss it was expected that Lawrence would be unlikely to continue with politics, Lawrence even making such inferences in his concession speech. Soon after leaving the mayoralty he was employed as chairman of Markham Developments, a Wellington-based property investment and development company.

Despite predictions he would not re-enter politics, in 1989 he stood for and was elected as a member of the Wellington Regional Council, remaining a member until 1995. When Belich retired as mayor in 1992 Lawrence (in a surprise move) put himself forward for the Citizens' Association nomination for the mayoralty, but lost out to former Wellington Central MP Ken Comber.

=== Later life and death ===
In the 1992 New Year Honours, Lawrence was appointed a Commander of the Order of the British Empire, for services to local government and the community. In 1993 he was appointed as local government commissioner and was later chairman of the National Housing Commission. He also served a spell as the president of the Wellington Rotary Club. In 1986 he had been awarded Roatary's community vocational services award for his 15 years service to local government.

His wife, Sandra, developed early onset Alzheimer's. When she no longer knew him he made provisions for her welfare and then left Wellington, feeling lonely without her, and made the Aliyah by moving to Israel in 2014. He had family to be close to there and found his new home socially and intellectually stimulating. He lived in Jerusalem and died there on 8 March 2019 after being diagnosed with bowel cancer.

== Personal life ==
Lawrence was married with five children. His wife died less than one year before he did. In early 1983 he has hospitalised for several days to remove kidney stones. He was Jewish. His younger sister, Jennifer, died unexpectedly aged 19 during routine surgery.

Political offices
Preceded by Michael Fowler	Mayor of Wellington; 1983–1986	Succeeded by Jim Belich
Preceded by John Jeffries	Deputy Mayor of Wellington; 1974–1983	Succeeded by Gavin Wilson
