= 1983 Wellington mayoral election =

New Zealand local election

- 8 October 1983
- Turnout: 38,856 (37.59%)
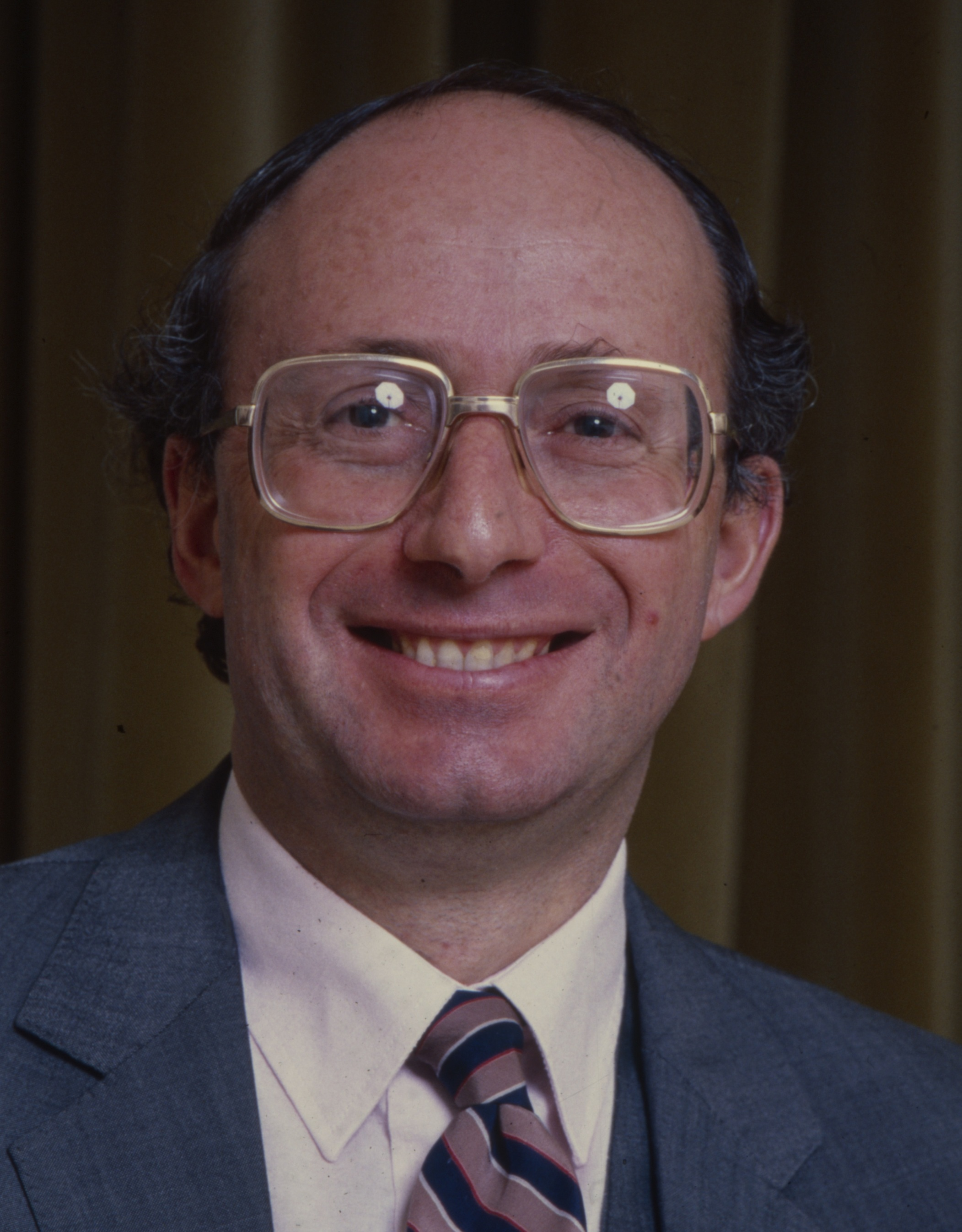

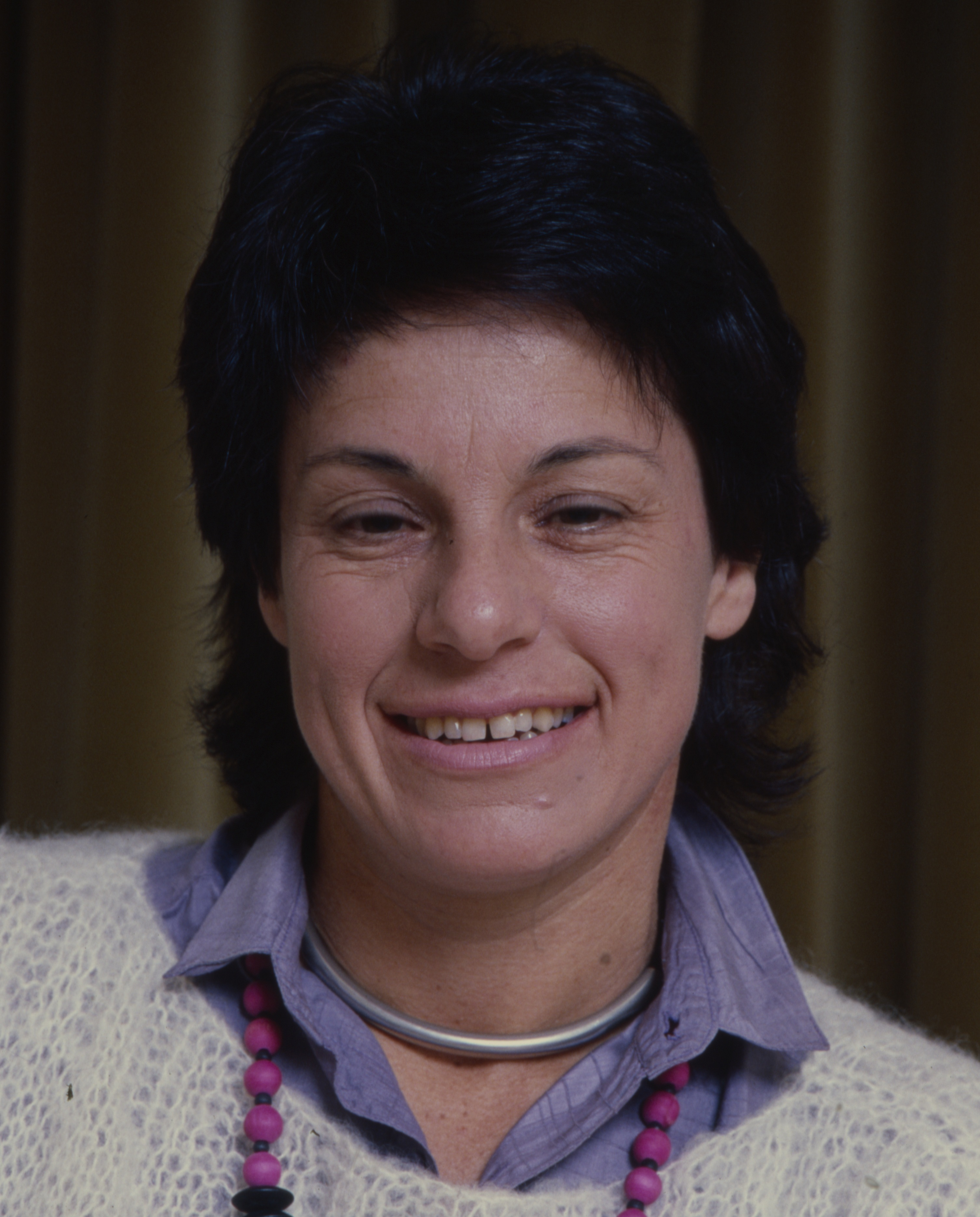
Candidate	Ian Lawrence	Helene Ritchie
Party	Citizens'	Labour
Popular vote	19,952	11,876
Percentage	49.28	30.56
Mayor before election
Sir Michael Fowler
Elected mayor
Ian Lawrence

The 1983 Wellington mayoral election was part of the New Zealand local elections held that same year. In 1983, elections were held for the Mayor of Wellington plus other local government positions including eighteen city councillors. The polling was conducted using the standard first-past-the-post electoral method.

== Background ==
The election saw deputy mayor Ian Lawrence voted in as the new Mayor of Wellington to replace Sir Michael Fowler who had retired. Lawrence retained the Mayoralty for the Citizens' Association, seeing off a challenge from high-profile Labour Party councillor Helene Ritchie. Given Lawrence's quiet style and low profile compared to Ritchie's more marked public reputation, most commentators and pollsters were predicting a very close result. The eventual outcome was a surprise to many with Lawrence winning by a margin exceeding 8,000 votes, with media dubbing him "Landslide Lawrence". Ritchie retrospectively blamed her loss on an "anti-woman vote".

The 1983 election was also notable as it saw former Citizens' councillor Leone Harkness re-elected to the council as an independent candidate, the first time a candidate without an official party ticket had been elected to the council since Berkeley Dallard in 1950. It also saw Jenny Brough (later Harris) retain her seat on the council after defecting from Labour in 1982. It also marked the last time in Wellington where local body elections elected councillors at large.

== Mayoralty results ==
1983 Wellington mayoral election
Party	Candidate	Votes	%	±%
Citizens'	Ian Lawrence	19,952	49.28	
Labour	Helene Ritchie	11,876	30.56	
Independent	Leone Harkness	6,208	15.97	
Independent	Josie Bullock	643	1.65	
Private Enterprise	Frank Moncur	177	0.45	−0.35
Informal votes		244	0.62	
Majority		8,076	20.78	
Turnout		38,856	37.59	

Results by locality
Locality	Lawrence	Ritchie	Harkness	Bullock	Moncur	Winner
Onslow College	333	159	97	7	4	Lawrence
Johnsonville West School	228	64	56	4	0	Lawrence
Johnsonville Emergency Centre	122	127	36	3	1	Ritchie
Johnsonville Community Centre	243	162	61	4	1	Lawrence
Johnsonville School	298	163	113	3	1	Lawrence
Paparangi School	186	105	73	2	2	Lawrence
Rewa Rewa School	151	72	44	1	2	Lawrence
White's Garage	56	23	6	0	1	Lawrence
Bellvue School	161	63	41	3	0	Lawrence
Centennial Hall	375	211	102	3	2	Lawrence
Newlands Tennis Club	68	40	20	0	0	Lawrence
Wallace's Garage	49	33	23	2	0	Lawrence
Churton Park School	202	57	65	2	0	Lawrence
Downer & Co.	52	14	14	2	1	Lawrence
Dragon St. Cafeteria	17	18	2	0	0	Ritchie
Ohariu Hall	50	33	15	0	0	Lawrence
Raumati Beach School	12	9	6	0	0	Lawrence
Cashmere Avenue School	219	75	64	5	0	Lawrence
Khandallah Scout Hall	225	50	55	1	0	Lawrence
St Barnabas Parish Hall	139	36	36	0	2	Lawrence
Khandallah Town Hall	907	251	165	7	2	Lawrence
Khandallah Masonic Hall	177	50	38	3	1	Lawrence
Ngaio School	46	43	11	0	1	Lawrence
Ngaio Kindergarten	115	64	32	2	0	Lawrence
Ngaio Town Hall	519	266	149	8	7	Lawrence
Union Church Hall	98	47	26	2	1	Lawrence
Ngaio Playcentre	90	43	15	0	0	Lawrence
Chartwell School	90	32	16	5	0	Lawrence
Wilton School	180	121	57	11	1	Lawrence
Wadestown School	78	44	27	2	0	Lawrence
St Luke's Hall	428	235	172	18	0	Lawrence
Thorndon Masonic Hall	125	75	51	8	0	Lawrence
Talavera Tennis Club	33	35	11	3	0	Ritchie
St Andrew's Hall	105	63	32	2	0	Lawrence
Victoria University	95	116	46	12	1	Ritchie
Kelburn Church Hall	300	271	161	20	2	Lawrence
Kelburn Normal School	82	76	40	2	1	Lawrence
Presbyterian Church Hall	57	55	29	2	1	Lawrence
Methodist Church Hall	218	143	103	8	5	Lawrence
Northland School	132	108	52	6	1	Lawrence
Coad's Garage	110	47	24	1	2	Lawrence
Karori Masonic Hall	140	70	46	4	0	Lawrence
Sprott House	269	56	76	9	2	Lawrence
St Mary's Parish Hall	245	74	75	2	1	Lawrence
Karori School	643	174	178	10	1	Lawrence
St John's Methodist Hall	486	185	133	8	5	Lawrence
Karori Pavilion	176	80	80	7	1	Lawrence
Karori West School	407	202	150	7	2	Lawrence
Makara Community Centre	36	27	15	8	0	Lawrence
Macalister Park	94	58	25	3	0	Lawrence
Kingston School	67	23	14	0	0	Lawrence
Ridgeway School	144	86	49	7	0	Lawrence
Vogelmorn Public Hall	67	40	18	1	0	Lawrence
Brooklyn Baptist Hall	261	179	104	8	2	Lawrence
Brooklyn Community Centre	109	108	27	6	0	Lawrence
St Matthew's Hall	166	111	51	8	1	Lawrence
Aro Valley Community Hall	133	317	75	18	1	Ritchie
Webb St. Depot	127	118	39	7	0	Lawrence
Willis St. Clinic	84	73	25	3	0	Lawrence
St John's Church Hall	88	113	40	3	2	Ritchie
Wellington Cathedral	91	98	33	2	1	Ritchie
Wellington Girls' College	50	52	27	2	0	Ritchie
Queen Margaret College	106	42	29	2	0	Lawrence
Wesley Church Hall	35	33	19	2	1	Lawrence
Wellington Polytechnic	59	78	38	7	0	Ritchie
Samoan Assembly of God	121	184	41	7	6	Ritchie
Berhampore School	120	161	68	6	1	Ritchie
Island Bay Church Hall	306	184	88	21	2	Lawrence
Island Bay Surf Club	55	38	15	1	0	Lawrence
Island Bay School	170	115	51	13	1	Lawrence
St Hilda's Church Hall	298	135	69	10	5	Lawrence
Owhiro Bay School	73	76	24	3	2	Ritchie
Houghton Valley School	67	58	29	3	2	Lawrence
Church of the Transfiguration	62	59	41	4	1	Lawrence
Newtown Fire Station	84	141	30	4	5	Ritchie
Salvation Army Hall	169	157	48	6	1	Lawrence
Newtown School	195	312	83	11	9	Ritchie
Wellington Hospital	78	89	31	0	0	Ritchie
Southern Cross Scout Hall	55	37	11	3	1	Lawrence
Methodist Church Hall	143	156	51	6	1	Ritchie
Rongotai College	154	143	42	7	3	Lawrence
Maranui Surf Lifesaving Club	147	92	66	9	11	Lawrence
Lyall Bay School	198	99	59	10	5	Lawrence
St Giles' Hall	263	161	61	10	4	Lawrence
All Saints' Church Hall	107	37	12	1	1	Lawrence
Samoan Methodist Church Hall	339	190	124	21	8	Lawrence
Sea Cadet Hall	50	15	24	1	0	Lawrence
Haitaitai School	309	143	83	5	0	Lawrence
Roseneath Church Hall	92	37	36	4	0	Lawrence
St Barnabas Church Hall	143	76	47	1	4	Lawrence
Freyberg Pool	198	80	45	11	3	Lawrence
Central Fire Station	168	142	55	8	1	Lawrence
Congregational Church Hall	105	150	45	6	0	Ritchie
St Mark's Church Hall	98	57	35	3	1	Lawrence
Miramar South School	152	80	49	4	0	Lawrence
Miramar Central School	548	265	130	17	5	Lawrence
Miramar North School	126	90	44	4	0	Lawrence
Marist Brothers' School	271	113	78	9	3	Lawrence
Miramar Co-op. Hall	199	98	43	3	2	Lawrence
St Christopher's Hall	48	53	39	3	0	Ritchie
Strathmore Park School	324	159	69	5	1	Lawrence
Breaker Bay Progressive Assn. Hall	30	24	8	4	1	Lawrence
Seatoun School	438	89	73	9	0	Lawrence
St George's Hall	141	43	42	4	1	Lawrence
Worser Bay Life Saving Club	47	23	16	6	1	Lawrence
Worser Bay School	150	48	54	11	0	Lawrence
Town Hall	455	399	203	25	2	Lawrence
Postal votes	666	327	189	15	6	Lawrence
Hospital votes	124	99	21	6	8	Lawrence
Special votes	612	546	184	25	4	Lawrence
Total	19,952	11,876	6,208	643	177	Lawrence

== Councillor results ==
1983 Wellington City Council election
Party	Candidate	Votes	%	±%
Citizens'	Jenny Brough	20,019	51.52	+13.57
Labour	Keith Spry	19,807	50.97	+5.16
Citizens'	Rosemary Young-Rouse	19,766	50.86	+8.26
Labour	Helene Ritchie	19,571	50.36	+2.42
Citizens'	Gavin Wilson	19,166	49.32	+8.22
Independent	Leone Harkness	18,478	47.55	+10.32
Labour	Joe Aspell	18,272	47.02	+7.18
Citizens'	Les Paske	18,236	46.93	+9.81
Citizens'	Bryan Weyburne	17,939	46.17	
Labour	Ros Noonan	17,936	46.16	−0.28
Citizens'	David Bull	17,567	45.21	−5.86
Labour	Hazel Bibby	17,321	44.57	+5.53
Labour	Tala Cleverley	16,901	43.49	+2.31
Citizens'	Rex Nicholls	16,857	43.38	
Labour	Margaret Bonner	16,696	42.96	
Citizens'	Arthur Kinsella	16,490	42.43	
Citizens'	Ruth Gotlieb	15,622	40.20	+20.80
Labour	Terry McDavitt	15,354	39.51	
Citizens'	Bruce Harris (Note: Harris was appointed to fill the vacancy on the council in 1985 caused by Leone Harkness' resignation)	15,163	39.02	−0.20
Citizens'	Roger Ridley-Smith	14,967	38.51	+1.18
Labour	Frank O'Flynn	14,931	38.42	−1.96
Citizens'	Colin Dickie	14,712	37.86	
Citizens'	Peter Isaac	14,319	36.85	
Citizens'	Saul Goldsmith	13,944	35.88	+1.83
Labour	Ken Boyden	13,920	35.82	
Labour	Allan Levett	13,235	34.06	
Citizens'	Sarah Lysaght	12,970	33.37	
Citizens'	Terry Dykes	12,904	33.20	
Citizens'	Michael Carney	12,780	32.89	
Labour	John Blincoe	12,321	31.70	
Labour	Paul Fitzgerald	12,282	31.60	
Citizens'	Joseph Kenneally	12,191	31.37	
Labour	Harry Holden	12,160	31.29	
Labour	John Gilberthorpe	11,986	30.84	
Labour	David Robinson	11,665	30.02	+0.94
Labour	Geoff Turner	11,004	28.31	
Labour	Joe McTaggart	10,692	27.51	+0.20
Independent	Josie Bullock	8,775	22.58	
Independent Citizens'	Eric Hughes	4,314	11.10	
Private Enterprise	Frank Moncur	3,228	8.30	+2.53
Independent	John Antonius Elise Pell	2,244	5.77	

Table footnotes:
