= Helene Ritchie =

New Zealand politician (born 1945)

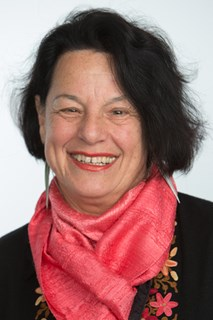

17th Deputy Mayor of Wellington
- In office 11 October 1986 – 13 April 1988
- Mayor: Jim Belich
- Preceded by: Gavin Wilson
- Succeeded by: Terry McDavitt

Wellington City Councillor
- In office 8 October 1977 – 14 October 1989
- In office 10 October 1998 – 8 October 2016

Wellington Regional Councillor
- In office 11 October 1980 – 8 October 1983
- In office 14 October 1989 – 10 October 1992

Capital and Coast District Health Board
- In office 13 October 2001 – 8 October 2016

Personal details
- Born: Helene Ruth Paula Hess; 16 March 1945 (age 81) Wellington, New Zealand
- Party: Labour
- Spouse: Peter Deans Ritchie (m. 1966) 1942 - 2001
- Education: Victoria University of Wellington, Massey University Palmerston North
- Profession: Psychologist, mediator

Helene Ruth Paula Ritchie (née Hess; born 16 March 1945) is a former Wellington (New Zealand) local government politician and registered psychologist and mediator. Wellington's longest- serving City Councillor, she served as Wellington's first female deputy mayor for two of her 30 years in local government.

Ritchie led the declaration of Wellington as a Nuclear Weapon Free Zone, chaired Wellington's Civic Centre project from its concept plan to Council decision, and chaired a six-year project that led up to the Wellington Town Belt Act 2016.

Ritchie represented the City Council on boards of its subsidiaries and collaborations, such as the Wellington Airport Authority athe New Zealand Organisation of (27) Airport Authorities, the Wellington Museum and Zealandia.

She was elected to the Wellington Regional Council and to the Capital and Coast District Health Board.

Ritchie's career as a local government representative ended with her 4th unsuccessful run for the Wellington City Mayoralty in 2016.

== Early life and family ==
Ritchie was born in Wellington to refugee parents who had fled the Holocaust from Prague in 1939 and 1940. She grew up in the state housing area of Naenae where she attended Hutt Valley High School.

Helene Ritchie studied psychology, education, languages and dispute resolution at Victoria University of Wellington and Massey University of Palmerston North, graduating with an MA, BA (Hons), Bachelor of Educational Studies, Diploma of Education, and a Diploma of Business Studies (conflict and dispute resolution).

Ritchie worked as a secondary school teacher, later a university extension lecturer, an executive director of a trade union correspondence education service and supervisor in early childhood education. After retraining, she worked in the Education Department as psychologist, focusing on children and families with special needs. There she developed guidelines for an approach away from deficit diagnosing and labelling to identifying strengths and needs and enhancing them through a psycho-social and educational approach and developing individual educational plans ('IEPs'). She also initiated advocacy for funding a new alternative school for young people; and later the establishment of a new 'Work Experience Unit' within a secondary school for young persons with special needs.

In 1966, Helene Hess married Peter Deans Ritchie (1942 - 2001) They had two children: Timothy (1971) and Jonathan (1972).

== Political career ==
=== National politics ===
Ritchie entered into politics in the 1970s through the women's movement, joining the Labour Party in 1976. She contributed to the Working Women's Charter, led by trade unionist and M.P. Sonja Davies, and was a member of the Labour Women's Council. She later took on leadership roles in the local Women's Electoral Lobby (WEL).

=== Parliamentary Candidate ===
Ritchie sought several times to enter Parliament, but was either not selected or was not elected.

In her first attempt, Ritchie was selected by Labour for the then safe National seat of Ohariu electorate in the 1978 general election - a time when only four of 87 members of Parliament were women and only 13 women had ever served in Parliament,

She unsuccessfully sought selection for the safe Labour seat of Christchurch Central in a 1979 by-election. She applied again for selection in several other safe Labour seats, such as Napier (twice), Island Bay, and as her "last try", Pencarrow.

=== Wellington City Councillor ===
==== First female Labour Leader Wellington City Council ====
Ritchie was first elected to the Wellington City Council in 1977, serving for 12 years until unsuccessfully standing for the Mayoralty in 1989. She was also elected to the first Wellington Regional Council in 1980, from which she resigned in 1983. She was voted in as Labour's first female Leader on council from 1980 to 1986, and was selected as the Labour candidate for Mayor (the first woman) in 1983, R.

The Council appointed her as Chair of the Airport Authority, a public joint venture with central government, from 1980 for eight years, and as ist representative to the Organisation of the 27 New Zealand Airports for 5 years.

Ritchie saw the ongoing privatisation of public asseto, as a betrcoreour's fundamenies, and contrary to her reason for joining the Party. Along with many others, she left the Labour Party in 1989. Ritchie rejoined the Labour Party after a gap of a few years, but from then on stood for election as an Independent, as formal election results showed.

In 1986, Ritchie became Wellington City's first female Deputy Mayor, appointed by Labour Mayor Jim Belich. She was dumped by her Labour colleagues on the Council in 1988. The leader of the opposing Citizens team publicly defended her, and was reported in the media saying that the Labour majority would never have been elected had it not been for her work on the sewage issue. According to Ritchie, no reason was ever given and she thought the episode was "very unfair and unjust". Within a few days, it became obvious and then extensively reported in the media, that her dumping had been a convenient cover-up of a major political, financial and governance blunder by the Mayor and Labour Councillors. The Government had to rescue and legalise this by a special Order-in-Council, to ensure that Wellington City Council could introduce a capital value rating system to replace land value system and legitimately raise the rates to run the City.

In 1989, she resigned from the Labour Party and stepped down as a Councillor to run for both the Mayoralty and Regional Council as an Independent. While losing the Mayoral race to Mayor Belich, she was elected to the Wellington Regional Council for a second term.

Ritchie stood for Mayor for a third time in 1992. Standing as an independent, she came second with 17% of the vote, compared to the 33% gained by former Wellington Central MP (later Dame) Fran Wilde.

Ritchie stepped out of politics for six years to care for her terminally ill husband.

Ritchie returned to the council in 1998, being elected in the Northern ward as an Independent. She remained on the Council until choosing not to seek re-election in 2016.

==== Apartheid and racism ====
In 1981 Ritchie established a delegation of prominent persons throughout New Zealand and co-led that delegation with the first Ombudsman, Sir Guy Powles, to present their submission to the Governor General Sir David Beattie, condemning apartheid and seeking a stop to the 1981 Springbok Tour of New Zealand.

==== Declaration of Wellington as a Nuclear Weapon Free Zone ====
One of Ritchie's achievements was the declaration of Wellington as a Nuclear Weapon Free Zone in 1982. This declaration came at a time when a nuclear warship, the USS Truxton, was about to enter Wellington Harbour. Within that year, half of New Zealand was living in declared nuclear weapon free zones, and women were spurred on to increase their representation in Local Government. There was major political fallout too: Mayor Michael Fowler, a member of the National Party, announced the day after the motion was passed that he would quit at the end of the term.

Despite two of his own team crossing the floor, he lashed out in a Dominion article at Labour councillors, particularly attacking the Labour women - three of whom he had once called the "petticoat troika". Reportedly he was also furious with his own two Councillors Betty Campbell and David Bull, who had crossed the floor of the council to vote with the Labour councillors and ensured that the motion was passed and the Declaration made.

Then on 14 June 1984, National Government Prime Minister (later Sir) Robert Muldoon, furious that one of his members (Marilyn Waring) had crossed the floor and voted with the opposition to support the Bill banning nuclear ships, called a snap election which he then lost. A Labour Government and Prime Minister David Lange were elected on the issue, and later successfully passed the New Zealand Nuclear Free Zone, Disarmament and Arms Control Act 1987.

==== Moa Point Campaign ====
In 1982 Councillor Ritchie spearheaded and then led the 4 year city-wide Moa Point campaign to stop raw sewage being discharged onto the beaches and into the ocean.

After Jim Belich was elected Mayor in 1986, running on a platform of stopping the discharge of raw sewage at Moa Point, Council adopted Ritchie's resolution that the city adopt land-based treatment to stop raw sewage being discharged into the ocean. The Moa Point sewage plant was completed in 1998.

==== Civic Centre ====
In 1986 Ritchie chaired the Civic Centre project, saying it would give Wellington a heart. Earlier, in 1982, Ritchie's motion, reported in the Evening Post, had stopped Mayor Michael Fowler's intention to demolish the historic Wellington Town Hall. Strengthening and upgrade of the Town Hall became part of the Civic Centre project. In 1988, Council adopted the concept plan which she had guided. It included the integration of world class new architecture - the Library and City Administration with the protection of older buildings threatened with demolition – the former City Library, later becoming the City Art Gallery, and the Town Hall. Mercer Street was closed and an open Civic public square created. Symbolic Nīkau palm structures designed by (later Sir) Ian Athfield, a waterfall, and water pools were throughout, with New Zealand sculptures added later. Athfield led the Council appointed consortium of architects: Athfield, Tebbs and Moller, managed by the City Architect Roger Shand.

This concept plan excluded the earlier 1986 proposal to build on what became Ilott Green.

==== Johnsonville Library and Pool upgrade ====
Ritchie campaigned for years in her ward for a new library for Johnsonville alongside the upgraded pool and community centre as a cohesive community hub. The Council formally proposed the new Library in the 2006 Johnsonville Town Centre Plan. By 2009, she again secured Council support for her motion to ensure the new library be built next door to the Keith Spry Pool. Between 2010 and 2013, Council staff and a newly elected Councillor again deferred the project and looked at a range of new locations. In 2011, four potential sites were consulted and the Northern Ward public and council again agreed for the site to be co-located with the Keith Spry Pool. In February 2014, she secured funding approval from the Council. Construction began in 2016, and the Te Whare Pukapuka o Waitohi Johnsonville Library at the Waitohi Hub was opened in 2019.

==== Press Council Ritchie versus the Dominion Post ====
In 2007 the Press Council upheld a complaint by Ritchie on the grounds of inaccuracy about two articles in the Dominion Post - as well as a third - that reported on Wellington City Councillor Helene Ritchie's attendance record and remuneration while on sick leave for breast cancer. This had followed an earlier attempt by four male councillors to block (by walking out of the vote) her request for sick leave.

==== Wellington Waterfront ====
Ritchie advocated consistently from 1981 for public space on The Waterfront, as a founding member of the Wellington Civic Trust, then as a City and Regional Councillor. In 2007 as an individual, she was successful in the Environment Court, alongside Waterfront Watch in opposing a Hilton Hotel. The Court in its decision said: “Mr McClelland and Mrs Ritchie. We felt in many ways their use and appreciation of the wharf as a safe and relatively vehicle free space reflected that of the Wellington public who use the waterfront and promenade.”.

“Wellington City Councillor Helene Ritchie who was one of the appellants said the decision vindicated her stand against the project. Mrs Ritchie said the decision showed the City Council needed to “get real” about the Waterfront and acknowledge public concern about how it was being developed.”

==== Supercity proposal 2009–2015 ====
She initiated opposition, and repeatedly over six years and was ultimately successful along with others, in stopping the proposal that Wellington follow Auckland’s model to become a ‘Super City’.

==== Health Board and Mental Health 2001-2016 ====
Her focus as a Health Board member for 15 years was primarily on improving mental health services establishing and heading a mental health subcommittee, on attempting to lower the rate of suicides and on the provision of home and community support services.

Eventually in 2010, after years of campaigning, she succeeded in persuading the Board members, Chief Executives and the chair, the Ministry of Health officials and Minister, to approve the necessary funding for a replacement and upgraded Psychiatric unit in the hospital.

==== Wellington Town Belt and Wellington’s Natural Environment ====
Ritchie's last six years on the Council were primarily devoted to improving the natural environment in Wellington in her role as Portfolio Leader of the natural environment - extending the Outer Town Belt by initiating Council’s purchasing of land for the Skyline walkway, and earlier protecting the Old Coach Road in the Northern Ward after many years and alongside much effort by local people.

The 2016 Wellington Town Belt Act was developed by the Council committee that Ritchie chaired, and consulted on with the Wellington public. Introduced by the local member of Parliament, Grant Robertson, it protected and enhanced the over 600 hectares of public green space around the inner city.

==== Mayoral candidate 2016 ====
In 2016, Ritchie stood for the Mayoralty for a fourth time, choosing not to seek re-election as a councillor. Placing 6th in the mayoral race after distribution of preferences, she left Council as the its longest-ever serving Councillor.

Ritchie was also unsuccessful in her bid for re-election to the District Health Board.

After leaving local government, Ritchie continued in voluntary capacities as a civic activist, commentator and writer.

== Community Activities ==
=== International Council of Jewish Women ===
Ritchie served on the Board of the Holocaust Centre of New Zealand and as President of the New Zealand affiliate of the International Council of Jewish Women.

==== Wellington Central Library ====
After the Library was closed in 2019, she joined the campaign to save it from demolition. Her submission to the Historic Places Trust may have contributed to its giving the library Category 1 historic protection.

==== Chair Wellington Civic Trust 2021-2026 ====
As Chair of the Wellington Civic Trust for five years from 2021 to 2026, Ritchie focussed on leading Trust submissions on issues related to the Waterfront and Town Belt; and to Te Ngākau/The Heart and Civic Square, opposing demolitions of it and Council’s neglect.

In 2024, she initiated and led the Trust's successful campaign with legal and public and Architecture Centre support to save the City to Sea Bridge and its unique architectural and sculpture works from proposed demolition by the Council, and in so doing saved the heart of the City, Te Ngākau from further demolitions. As a result, the newly elected Labour Mayor Andrew Little and Council revoked the demolition resolution.

== Published works ==
=== Books ===
- Ritchie Helene The Burned Letter: A New Zealander’s Holocaust Mystery HR Press, 2023.
- Ritchie Helene Peter and Me, When a love story becomes a carer’s anguish, Fraser Books, 2013
- Ritchie Helene 30 years of Nuclear Weapon Free Wellington Sarah Bennett publisher, 2012
- Ritchie Helene 25 Years of Nuclear Weapon Free Wellington Sarah Bennett publisher, 2007

=== Book chapters ===
- Ritchie Helene MMP Case for better representation of women in Catt Helena Harris Paul, Roberts Nigel Voter’s Choice. Dunmore Press, 1992
- Ritchie Helene M.A. or Mrs. in Sinclair Mary ed. Women Workers in New Zealand. New Zealand Working women’s Charter and Council, 1977

== Notes ==
Political offices
Preceded by Gavin Wilson	Deputy Mayor of Wellington; 1986–1988	Succeeded by Terry McDavitt
