= Terry McDavitt =

New Zealand educator, politician and activist

Terry McDavitt JP
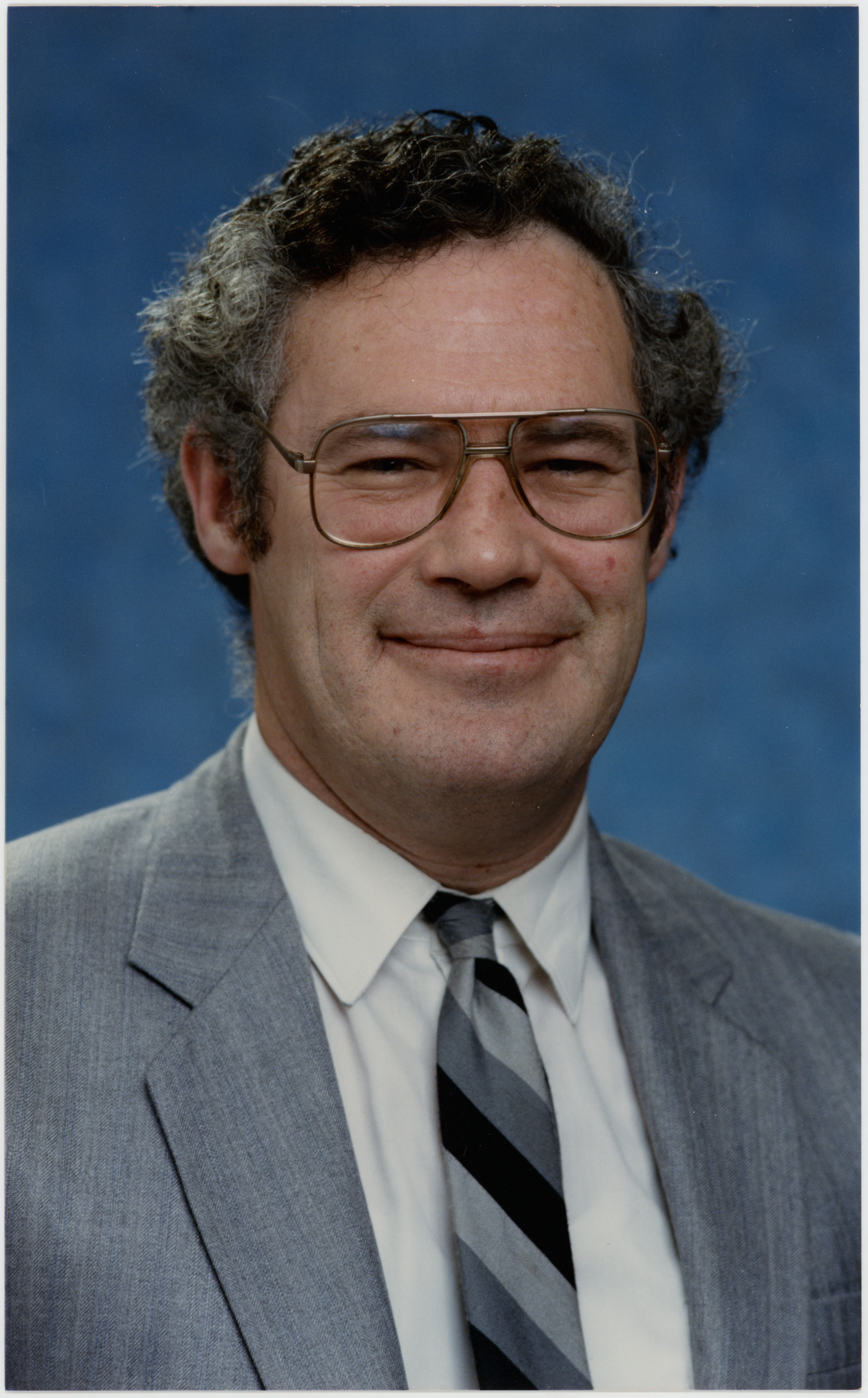
- McDavitt in 1990

18th Deputy Mayor of Wellington
- In office 13 April 1988 – 1 November 1989
- Mayor: Jim Belich
- Preceded by: Helene Ritchie
- Succeeded by: David Watt

Wellington City Councillor
- In office 8 October 1983 – 10 October 1992
- Ward: At-large (1983–86); Lambton (1986–92)

Personal details
- Born: 2 January 1948 (age 78) Dannevirke, New Zealand
- Party: Labour
- Other political affiliations: Values Party
- Education: Victoria University of Wellington

Terry Joseph McDavitt JP (born 2 January 1948) is a New Zealand educator, politician and activist.

== Biography ==
=== Early life ===
Terry McDavitt was born in Dannevirke in 1948. He was educated in Wellington at St. Patrick's College, later attending Victoria University of Wellington and graduated in 1970 with a Master of Arts degree. He was an activist in his youth and organised multiple protests against the Vietnam War and apartheid. In 1979 he became head of General Studies at Wellington Polytech, a position he retained until 1987, when he resigned to focus on his political career. He is a justice of the peace.

McDavitt married Kate Ford in 1970 and had two children; Ruth in 1975 and Joseph in 1978. He and Ford were divorced in 1984. McDavitt married Sue Lee in 1994.

=== Political career ===
McDavitt became politically active in the early 1970s and joined the environmentalist Values Party. in 1974 he stood unsuccessfully for the Wellington City Council on a Values ticket. In 1975 he was elected as the party's Wellington regional convener, replacing Tony Brunt who stepped down from the role. He also served as the General Secretary of the Values Party from 1974 until 1979 when he decided to leave the role. The role was no longer paid and he left it for a role as a communications tutor. He stayed on in a voluntary basis with several friends performing necessary duties until the next annual conference. He was in favour of homosexual law reform in New Zealand and listed his name openly in support.

By the 1980s McDavitt had left the Values Party and had joined the Labour Party. He stood again for the City Council in 1983 on a Labour ticket and was elected. He transferred to the Lambton Ward in 1986 and would remain on the council until 1992 when he decided not to seek re-election. In 1988 he was appointed deputy to Mayor Jim Belich after the removal of Helene Ritchie, following a series of feuds with Labour councillors over policy. He held that position until 1989 when Labour lost their majority on the council.

In 1989 he was elected to the Wellington Regional Council on a Labour ticket. Wishing to concentrate more on his regional council duties prompted him to give up his role as Labour leader on the council to Sue Driver, who was Labour's nominee for the deputy mayoralty. As Labour no longer had a council majority the deputy role went to David Watt, an independent. As a regional councillor he chaired the transport committee, and would serve for 21 years until he was defeated in 2010 standing as an independent. He was the chair of both the public transport and land transport committees and also served as Deputy Chair of the Regional Council from 2001 to 2007.

== Notes ==
Political offices
| Preceded by Helene Ritchie | Deputy Mayor of Wellington; 1988–1989 | Succeeded by David Watt |
| New constituency | Wellington City Councillor for Lambton Ward; 1986–1992 | Succeeded by Liz Thomas |
