= Moa Point =

Suburb in Wellington, New Zealand

- Suburb
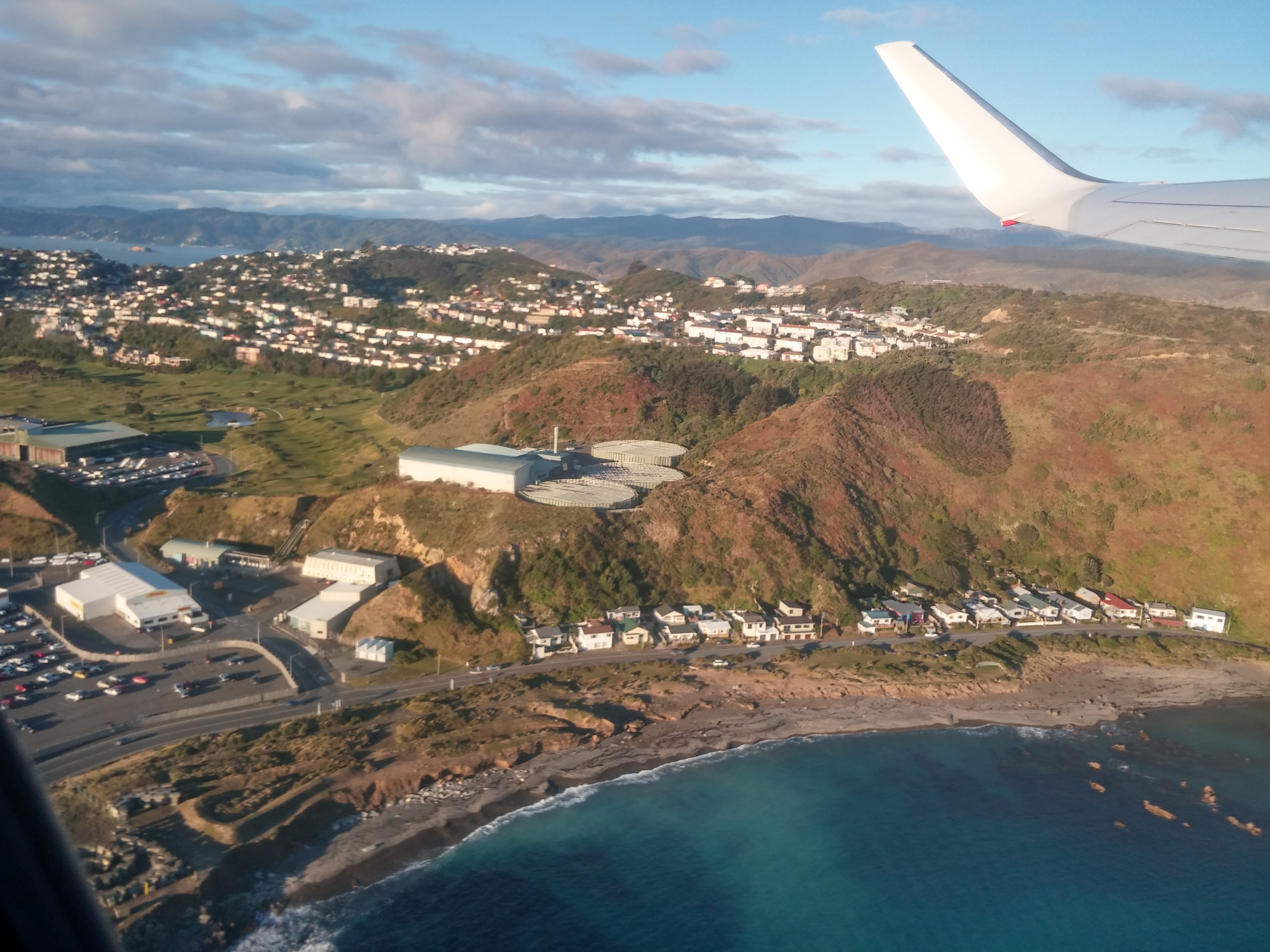
- Aerial view of Moa Point, showing the airport to the left and the sewage treatment plant on the hill above the houses.
- Interactive map of Moa Point
- Country: New Zealand
- City: Wellington City
- Electoral ward: Motukairangi/Eastern Ward
- Airports: Wellington International Airport

Rongotai	(Wellington Airport)	Strathmore Park
Lyall Bay	Moa Point	Breaker Bay
	(Cook Strait)

Moa Point is a small suburb in Wellington, New Zealand, situated on the south coast between Lyall Bay to the west and Tarakena Bay to the east. As of 2015 there were 21 households in the suburb.

== Toponymy ==
The suburb got its name in 1926 when the estate of HD Crawford sold 39 sections for a new housing area to be known as 'Moa Point Estate', described as "one of the warmest, sunniest and most sheltered positions in Wellington". The hill behind the housing estate was called Moa Point Hill: moa bones and gizzard stones and evidence of Māori occupation had been found in the area in the nineteenth century.

== History ==
The hill was flattened during construction of Wellington Airport from the 1930s to the 1950s, with spoil used for reclamation in Lyall Bay and for other road works. Some houses at the northern end of Moa Point were relocated or removed and the promontory that existed there is now under the airport.

== Demographics ==
Moa Point, including Tarakena Bay, has an area of 0.34 km^{2} (0.13 sq mi) It is part of the larger Rongotai statistical area.

Historical population
Year	Pop.	±% p.a.
2013	48	—
2018	33	−7.22%
2023	39	+3.40%

Moa Point had a population of 39 in the 2023 New Zealand census, an increase of 6 people (18.2%) since the 2018 census, and a decrease of 9 people (−18.8%) since the 2013 census. There were 21 males and 18 females in 21 dwellings. 15.4% of people identified as LGBTIQ+. The median age was 48.4 years (compared with 38.1 years nationally). There were 6 people (15.4%) aged under 15 years, 6 (15.4%) aged 15 to 29, 24 (61.5%) aged 30 to 64, and 9 (23.1%) aged 65 or older.

People could identify as more than one ethnicity. The results were 84.6% European (Pākehā); 7.7% Māori; 7.7% Pasifika; 23.1% Asian; and 7.7% Middle Eastern, Latin American and African New Zealanders (MELAA). English was spoken by 100.0%, and other languages by 15.4%. The percentage of people born overseas was 38.5, compared with 28.8% nationally.

Religious affiliations were 46.2% Christian, 15.4% Islam, and 7.7% New Age. People who answered that they had no religion were 38.5%.

Of those at least 15 years old, 15 (45.5%) people had a bachelor's or higher degree, 15 (45.5%) had a post-high school certificate or diploma, and 6 (18.2%) people exclusively held high school qualifications. The median income was $32,000, compared with $41,500 nationally. 9 people (27.3%) earned over $100,000 compared to 12.1% nationally. The employment status of those at least 15 was 15 (45.5%) full-time, 9 (27.3%) part-time, and 3 (9.1%) unemployed.

== Environment ==
Little blue penguins nest along Wellington's south coast, including at Moa Point where nesting boxes have been provided by Forest and Bird under their 'Places for Penguins' project.

Hue te Taka peninsula is a rocky platform about 500m long extending from Moa Point which becomes an island at high tide. It is home to penguins and many species of native plants.

== Wastewater treatment plant ==
Moa Point is known for its wastewater treatment plant, which treats sewage from the majority of Wellington city. From 1899 until 1989, raw sewage was discharged into the inter-tidal zone at Moa Point. A council proposal to continue to discharge untreated sewage at Moa Point with only milliscreening became a public controversy, and was a significant factor in the defeat of the incumbent mayor, Ian Lawrence by Jim Belich in the 1986 Wellington City mayoral election. Milliscreening was added in 1989, as part of a transition to a land-based secondary treatment system.

In 1995 Wellington City Council contracted British company Anglian Water International to provide a sewage treatment plant for Wellington at Moa Point, at a cost of $149 million. The facility opened officially in September 1998. The treatment process has several steps: liquid is screened to remove solids, then goes through settling tanks. After treatment with an agent to separate out bacteria, the liquid is treated with ultraviolet light to eliminate most remaining bacteria and viruses. The treated water is then discharged to the ocean in Cook Strait via a 1.8-kilometre-long (1.1 mi) marine outfall pipe.

The plant can discharge up to 260,000 cubic metres of wastewater per day. During periods of heavy rainfall the volume of wastewater coming in sometimes gets too high and the plant may need to discharge partly treated sewage into the ocean. If this happens warning notices are displayed at Moa Point and Lyall Bay and are notified online.

In May 2021, Wellington City Council approved a 10 year plan that included expenditure of $2.7 billion on water pipe maintenance and upgrades in Wellington city, and an additional $147 to $208 million for plant upgrades at the Moa Point wastewater treatment plant.

In July 2023 Wellington City Council announced that it had signed a contract with two companies, McConnell Dowell Constructors Ltd and HEB Construction Ltd, to build new sludge minimisation infrastructure at the wastewater treatment plant. Sludge is mixed with general waste and buried in landfill, so minimising the amount produced is valuable. The Council expects that the new facility will reduce wastewater sludge by 60 to 80 percent and reduce carbon emissions created by the treatment process by 60 percent. In June 2024, the Council announced that the treatment plant would be given a Māori name that references waste water: Te Whare Wai Para Nuku. The facility is projected to open in 2026.

On 4 February 2026, there was a complete failure of the Moa Point treatment plant when wastewater backed up and flooded the facility. Wellington Water stated that the plant would be out of service for an extended period and that it could take months to repair. Around 70 million litres per day of untreated sewage was discharged into a short ocean outfall at Tarakena Bay. The public were warned to stay away from beaches on the Wellington south coast. Wellington mayor Andrew Little described the failure as an environmental disaster. By 6 February, Wellington Water had begun pumping screened sewerage through its 1.8km outfall pipe.

On 1 October 2026, the Greater Wellington Regional Council filed criminal charges against both water services company Tiaki Wai and the Wellington City Council over their handling of the Moa Point wastewater spillage. As the successor to Wellington Water, Tiaki Wai inherited its predecessor's responsibilities and liabilities.

== Animal shelter ==
Wellington City Council operates an animal shelter located on the south coast adjacent to Moa Point. The facility was constructed in 1968, and provides temporary shelter for a wide range of animals, mostly impounded and stray dogs, but also including wild birds and escaped domestic animals such as pigs.
