= Jim Belich =

New Zealand politician

Sir James Belich
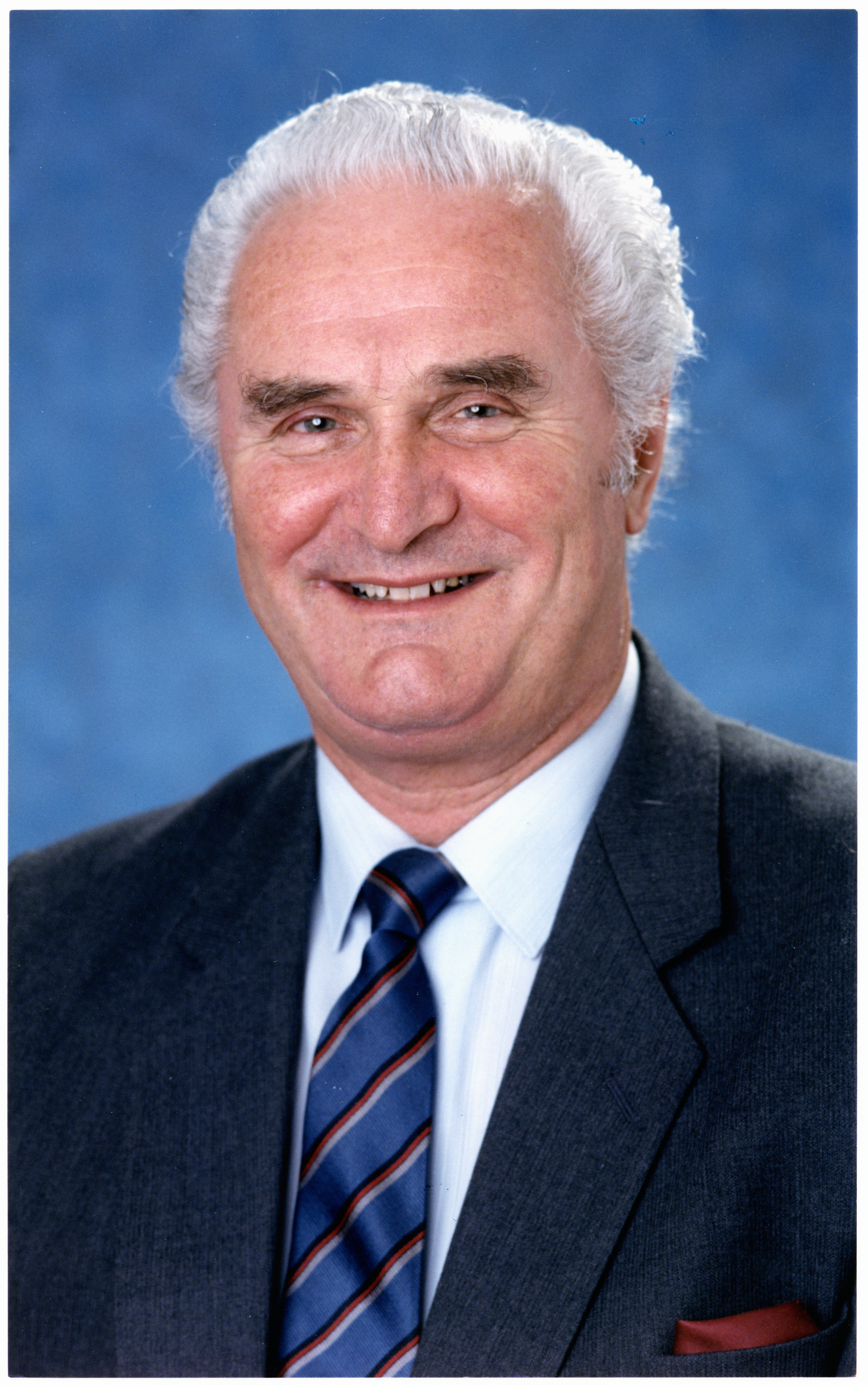
- Belich in 1990

30th Mayor of Wellington
- In office 30 October 1986 – 28 October 1992
- Deputy: Helene Ritchie (1986-88); Terry McDavitt (1988-89); David Watt (1989-92)
- Preceded by: Ian Lawrence
- Succeeded by: Fran Wilde

Personal details
- Born: 25 July 1927 Awanui, New Zealand
- Died: 13 September 2015 (aged 88) Wellington, New Zealand
- Party: Labour
- Spouse: Valerie Anzulovich (m. 1951)
- Relations: James Belich (son); Camilla Belich (granddaughter)
- Children: 3
- Education: Victoria University College
- Profession: Advertising agent

Sir James Belich (25 July 1927 – 13 September 2015) was a New Zealand local politician. He was the mayor of Wellington from 1986 to 1992.

== Biography ==
=== Early life and career ===
Belich was born on 25 July 1927, of Croat descent, in Awanui, Northland, to immigrant parents, Jakov and Marija, from the Dalmatian island of Korcula. He grew up bilingual, speaking Croatian with his parents and English to both of his elder brothers. His family home was a two room house at the edge of a gum-digging town, later with a lean-to kitchen added by his father after borrowing £400. He helped diggers from the gumfields at the supply shop next to their house by translating for them into English to the shopkeeper. He was head boy at Otahuhu College. He and his two brothers formed a Hawaiian music and dancing band. At one wedding in Auckland they were playing at he met his future wife who was the bridesmaid. He received his tertiary education at the Auckland University College and Victoria University College, graduating from the latter with a Bachelor of Arts in 1955. In 1948, due to his education and language skills, he was asked by the Yugoslav government to work with expatriate communities of Yugoslavs in both New Zealand and Australia. For the next several years he worked with the politically fragmented communities (many who had fled invasion from Nazi Germany) in both Auckland and Sydney until 1956.

He worked for the firm J. Inglis Wright Advertising from 1956 to 1986. He was head of the firm from 1974 to 1986. He had joined the Labour Party in 1954 and was involved in advertising for the party, including media training for Labour leader Norman Kirk for television appearances.

Belich was the founding president of UNICEF New Zealand during which time New Zealand signed up to the United Nations treaty on the Convention on the Rights of the Child. He was also president of the United Nations Association and in 1979 was chairman of the International Year of the Child, which led to the establishment of the Children's Commission. Belich belonged as well to Rotary, the Wellington Chamber of Commerce and the Wellington Club.

=== Political career ===
Since his youth Belich had been a supporter of the Labour Party. He attributed this to the lack of financial security his parents and other people in the town he grew up in had and thought Labour promised "jobs and a fair go for workers". Belich had been approached to stand for mayor in 1977 and 1980, but declined the offers for personal reasons. In 1986 Belich, supported by Wellington Central MP Fran Wilde, was chosen as Labour's candidate for mayor over regional councillor Ken Boyden and Wellington Clean Water Campaign convener John Blincoe. His main opponent in his election bid was incumbent mayor Ian Lawrence. Belich and Lawrence had been friends for nearly twenty years adding a more personal element than normal to an election. The two first met in the late-1960s when Lawrence, as a member of the Jaycees, helped organise a fundraising international ball for a UNICEF, which Belich was then president of. Both of them agreed to a "peace pact" to fight fair in the election.

Highlighting an unpopular council sewage scheme, both the Labour Party and the Wellington Clean Water Campaign ran a hostile ad campaign against Lawrence and the Citizens' Association. Lawrence responded, stressing that the sewage scheme was a collective decision of the council, not a personal decision of his. In the last week of the campaign Labour launched a series of particularly controversial advertisements on Lawrence and the council. One newspaper ad showed a toilet on the beach, linking to the clean water campaign to stop raw sewage discharge at Moa Point. Lawrence was angered by the attack which reneged on an earlier pact between the two to fight fair. Belich professed that he did not intend for any personal offence. The hostility of the sewage ads left Lawrence feeling bitter, but did not blame Belich personally for them.

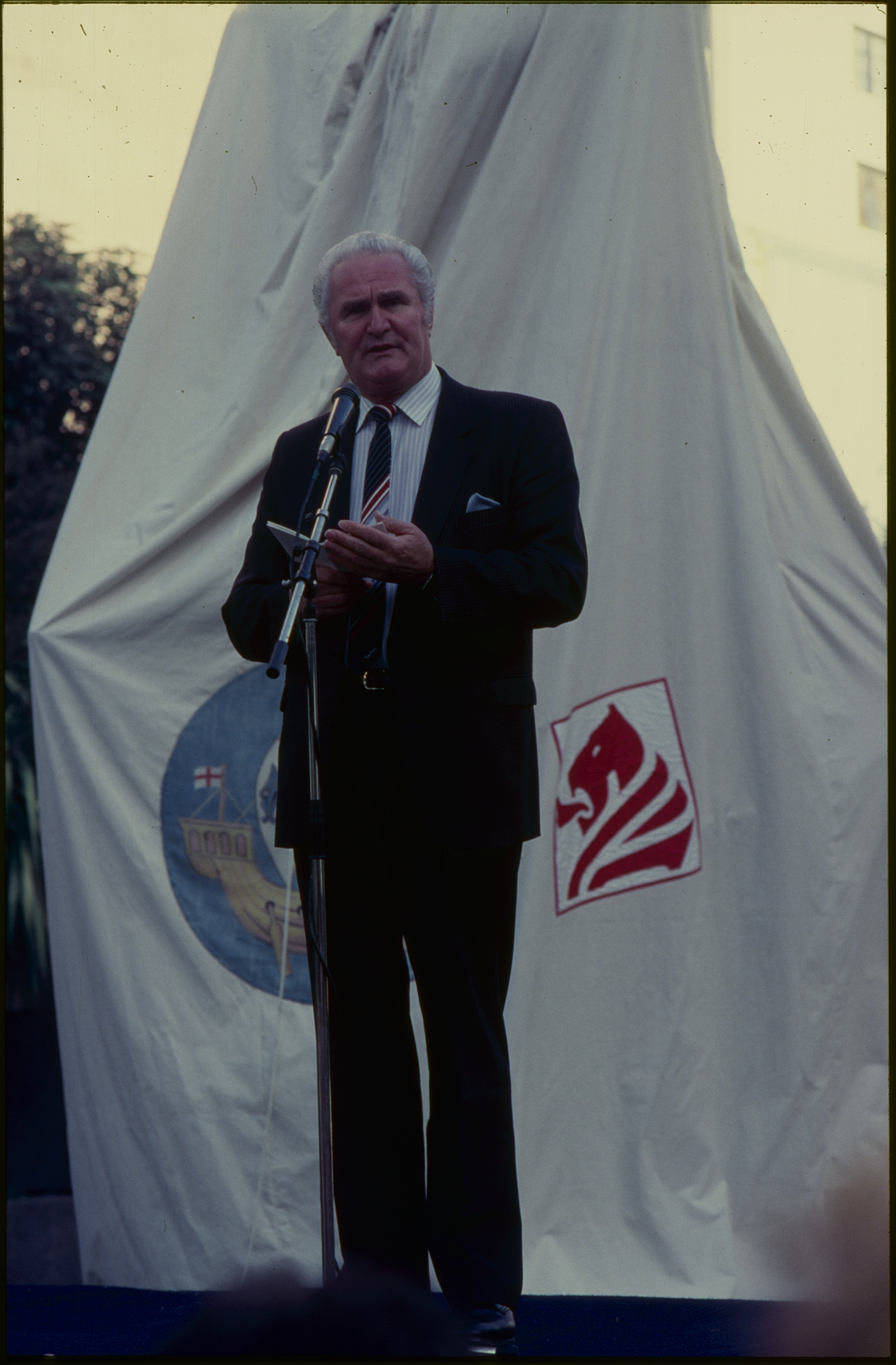
Mayor Jim Belich at the unveiling of The Bronze Form sculpture by Henry Moore, Midland Park, Wellington, in 1988

Belich was elected mayor of Wellington, despite having no previous experience as an elected official and was re-elected in 1989. He also served on the Wellington Regional Council and Wellington Harbour Board from 1986 to 1989. Key to Belich's victory was a campaign pledge to end the practice of discharging raw sewage into the sea along the south coast of the city which sullied the sea. Belich began the process toward a newer and more environmentally sustainable sewerage system, however the years long project to build a new plant was not completed until after he retired. During most of his mayoralty Wellington was going through a period of economic recession. Belich and the majority Labour councillors navigated the downturn through a public works programme which included an extension to the Kilbirnie pool and the re-development of the central library, art museum and Civic Square. Belich also oversaw large changes in council operations, due to the 1989 local government reforms, seeing council departments restructured to self accountable business units. He also set up a trust to organise the infamous 'Sesqui 1990' celebrations to mark 150 years since the foundation of Wellington.

Belich retired from the mayoralty in 1992.

=== Later life and death ===
In 2008, Belich was made an honorary citizen of the town that his family came from, Korčula in Dalmatia, Croatia. He died in Wellington on 13 September 2015.

== Awards and recognition ==
In 1990, Belich was awarded the New Zealand 1990 Commemoration Medal. In the 1991 New Year Honours, he was appointed as a Knight Bachelor, for services to local government and the community.

In 2019 the Wellington City Council opened a playground in Berhampore named the Jim Belich Playground after him.

== Personal life ==
In 1951, Belich married Valerie Anzulovich, who was also of Croatian descent. They had three children, including the historian, James Belich. A year into the marriage his mother-in-law moved in with them at their flat in Mount Cook. His wife, Valerie, Lady Belich, died in 2022. His granddaughter, Camilla Belich, was elected to the New Zealand Parliament on the Labour list in the 2020 election.

Political offices
Preceded by Ian Lawrence	Mayor of Wellington; 1986–1992	Succeeded by Fran Wilde
