= Waterfront Watch =

- Type: NGO
- Location: Wellington, New Zealand
- President: Pauline Swann
- Vice President: David Lee
- Website: www.waterfrontwatch.org.nz

Waterfront Watch Inc is a Wellington organisation which aims to preserve the Wellington waterfront from excessive development. Throughout its history it has frequently engaged in legal action to stop what it sees as negative developments.

On the Waterfront Watch website, the organisation describes its purpose as:

We are committed to preserving this resource for the people of Wellington and whilst we will support appropriate development that enhances public spaces and usage, we will question any excessive development that seeks to privatise and restrict public access, remove views and viewshafts, downgrades our heritage or introduces excess shading or wind issues.

== Notable campaigns ==
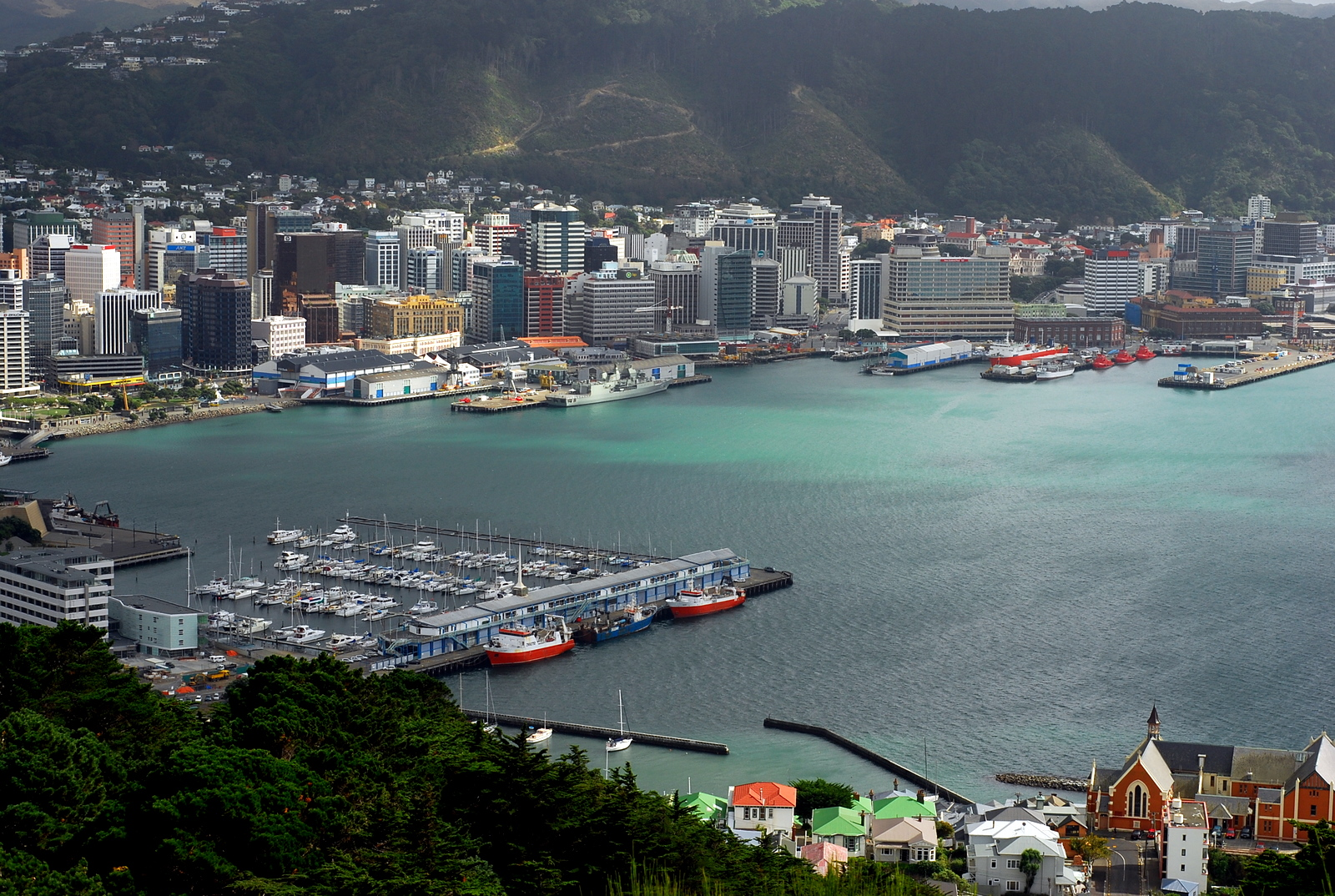
Part of the Wellington waterfront

=== Variation 17 ===
In the late 1990s there was a proposal – termed Variation 17 – to redevelop Wellington's waterfront into a mixture of public and private spaces. The proposal drew fierce criticism from some quarters, and Waterfront Watch was formed to stop the proposal. The Wellington City Council received a record-breaking 2,500 public submissions, of which 94% opposed the variation proposal. As a result, the variation proposal was shelved, and the area now known as Waitangi Park remains as public land.

=== North Kumutoto development ===
In November 2013, Wellington Waterfront Ltd detailed plans for an office building on the Kumutoto wharf which is over the 22 metre height limit for the area. The proposal came after plans in 2012 for a 6-story office block were blocked by the Environment Court. Waterfront Watch President Pauline Swann said she was appalled that the proposal was going against the Court's recommendation: "We're very concerned. I've had a word to a few councillors about it."

== See also ==
- Wellington Harbour
