= Socialism in New Zealand =

Political movement advocating socio-economic change in New Zealand

Socialism in New Zealand had little traction in early colonial New Zealand but developed as a political movement around the beginning of the 20th century. Much of socialism's early growth was found in the labour movement.

The extent to which socialism plays a part in modern New Zealand politics depends on which definitions of socialist are used, but few mainstream politicians would describe themselves using the word "socialist". The term "social-democrat" is more common, but the general "left-wing" or "centre-left" are used far more frequently. New Zealand has a complicated assortment of socialist causes and organisations. Some of these play a considerable role in public activism, such as the anti-war movement; other groups are strongly committed to socialist revolution.

Several prominent political parties in New Zealand, such as the New Zealand Labour Party, have historical links to socialism but are not generally considered socialist today due to their acceptance of a capitalist economy. More likely to receive this label are the small Marxist organisations that exist outside the political mainstream, such as Organise Aotearoa, the International Socialist Organisation, Socialist Aotearoa.

== History of New Zealand socialism ==
Academic Josephine F. Milburn argues that socialist theories were introduced by immigrant workers with experience in the British labour movement. Their ideas were not widely accepted, however. The Liberal Government of New Zealand that was dominant 1891–1912 rejected socialism but it supported unions, and the government built the foundations of the country's welfare state in the 1890s and fought the large landholders. Milburn argues that governmental activism cannot be attributed to the influence of the small socialist movement.

=== Unions and workers' parties ===
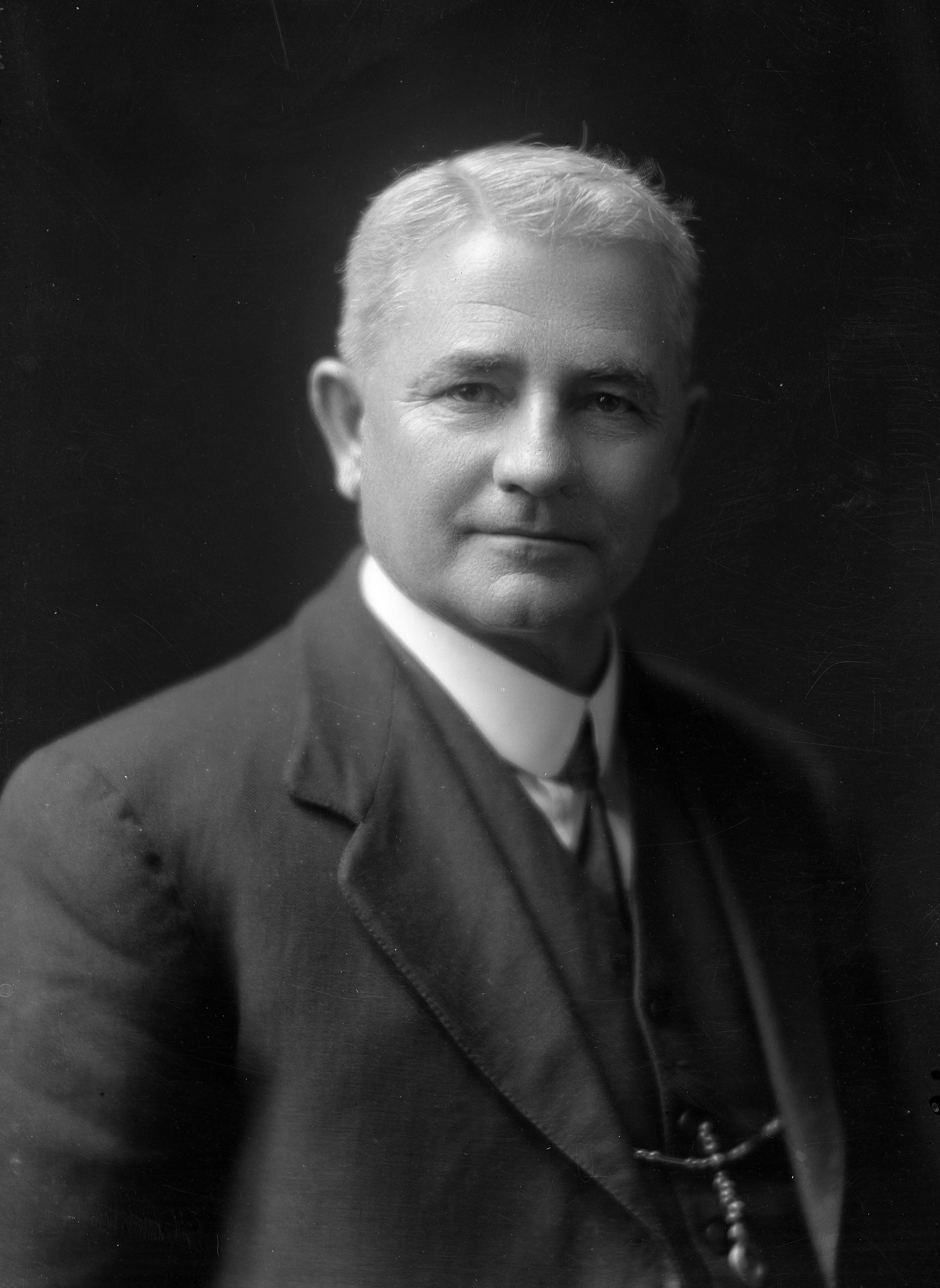
Harry Holland, a socialist who was a founder and leader of the modern Labour Party

Ideological socialism, when it arrived, mostly stemmed from Britain or other British colonies. Much of socialism's early growth was found in the labour movement, and often coincided with the growth of trade unions. During the 1870s, James McPherson and his Canterbury Working Men's Mutual Protection Society had written to Karl Marx, requesting affiliation with the First International. The New Zealand Federation of Labour (also known as the "Red Federation") was influenced by socialist theories, as were many other labour organizations. The Red Federation was formed in 1909 when a federation of the mining unions invited other unions to join a New Zealand Federation of Labour. The Red Federation's official organ was the Maoriland Worker, which advocated militant unionism and socialism. Key Red Federation leaders included the Australian–born Hickey and Paddy Webb, and fellow Australian Bob Semple. In opposition to the Red Federation, mainstream trade and labour councils formed a rival Federation of Labour.

The arrival of 200 British socialists called the "Clarion Settlers" led to the formation of the New Zealand Socialist Party in 1901, which promoted the works of Marx and Friedrich Engels. Strongly influenced by the British Independent Labour Party, the Socialist Party advocated promoting socialism through education and agitation rather than elections. The group met with little tangible success, but it nevertheless had considerable impact on the development of New Zealand socialism, forging close ties with the "Red Federation." In particular, Edward Hunter (sometimes known under the pen name "Billy Banjo", and a member of both the Socialist Party and the Red Federation), was a major figure in the spread of socialist ideas to the unions.

In the years leading up to the First World War, several New Zealand and Australian socialists including Harry Holland, Michael Joseph Savage, Peter Fraser, Harry Scott Bennett, Tom Barker, Tom Bloodworth, and Bob Semple advocated the creation of a "Cooperative Commonwealth" in which all land and means of wealth production, distribution, and management would be owned and managed collectively by the people. Besides Marx and Engels, these antipodean socialists were influenced by various radical European and American writers including Henry George, Edward Bellamy, Georges Sorel, August Bebel, Eugene Debs, Bill Haywood, and Irving Fisher. In 1912, a Petone Marxian Club was formed and met every Monday. This was one of the forerunners to the New Zealand Marxian Association.

The growth of unionism eventually led to the establishment of a number of socialist-influenced parties. Originally, the working class vote was concentrated mainly with the Liberal Party, where a number of prominent left-wing politicians (such as Frederick Pirani) emerged. Later, however, there were increasing calls for an independent workers' party, particularly as the Liberals began to lose their reformist drive.

The second organised party to gain a seat in Parliament (after the Liberal Party) was the small Independent Political Labour League, which won an urban electorate in Wellington in the 1908 election. Later, in 1910, the IPLL was reformed as the Labour Party (not to be confused with the modern party).

=== Emergence of the Labour Party ===
Socialist; Party (1901)	Independent; Political; Labour; League (1905)
(independents)	Labour Party (original) (1910)
United Labour; Party (1912)
Social Democratic; Party (1913)	(remnants)
Labour Party (1916)

The growing drive for unity among left-wing groups resulted in a "Unity Conference" being called in 1912. This conference aimed to merge the various left-wing parties in New Zealand, including both the moderate Labour Party and the hardline Socialist Party. The Socialist Party, however, refused to attend the conference, and the new United Labour Party consisted only of the Labour Party and a number of independent campaigners.

Premier William Massey's "heavy-handed" suppression of the Waihi miners' strike prompted another attempt at unity in 1913. This time, the Socialists were willing to attend. A new group, the Social Democratic Party, was formed, merging the United Labour Party and the Socialist Party. A faction of the United Labour Party refused to accept the decision, however, and continued on under the same name. Later, a decision by the Social Democrats to support a strike of dockworkers and coal miners resulted in a number of Social Democratic leaders being arrested, leaving the party in disarray in the 1914 election, the remnants of the United Labour Party actually won more seats than the "united" Social Democrats.

Finally, in 1916, it was agreed that the Social Democrats and the United Labour Party remnants would all be amalgamated into a single group, the New Zealand Labour Party. The new Labour Party was explicitly socialist, and was based around goals of redistribution of wealth, nationalization of industry, and elimination of conscription. Eventual Labour Party leader, Harry Holland, was strongly socialist in his beliefs, having been associated with the Socialist Party and with the striking miners in Waihi. Holland believed that the militancy at Waihi was a sign of further impending class conflict. While the Labour Party gained some electoral success, it continued to trail the Liberal Party and the Reform Party until the replacement of Holland with Michael Joseph Savage. Savage, although also involved in the earlier Socialist Party, was more moderate than Holland, and Labour gained considerable support. Assisted by the Great Depression, Labour won a decisive victory in the 1935 election.

=== Labour's social democracy ===
Despite its socialist roots, the Labour Party shifted towards a more social democratic orientation once in power. The First Labour Government led by Savage and Peter Fraser implemented a range of socialist policies such as nationalising industry, broadcasting, transportation, and a Keynesian welfare state. However, the party did not seek to abolish capitalism, instead opting for a mixed economy. Labour's welfare state and mixed economy were not challenged until the 1980s.

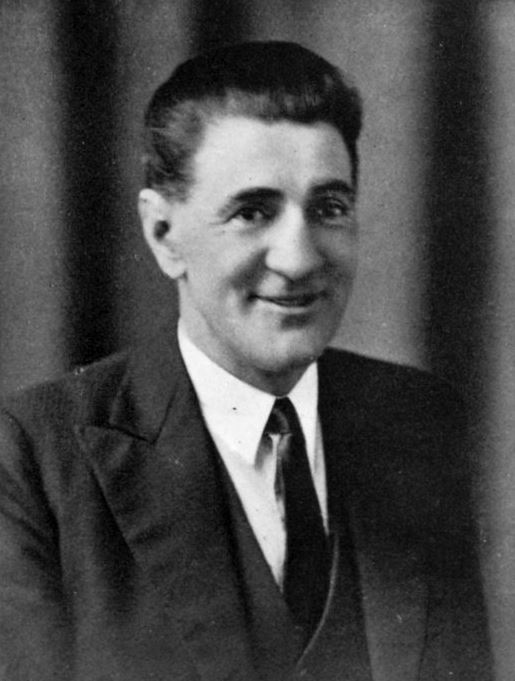
John A. Lee was a prominent socialist figure in the Labour Party from the 1920s until his expulsion in 1940.

Two years after the Labour Party lost the 1949 election, the goal of implementing "the socialisation of the means of production, distribution, and exchange" was removed from the party's policy platform. This is sometimes seen as the end of any real claim to full socialism by the Labour Party. However, the shift away from socialism had not come about without dispute. Labour Party politician John A. Lee was harshly critical of the changes, and had eventually left to establish the Democratic Labour Party in 1940. The party was considerably more socialist than Labour, but performed poorly. Many members eventually left the party, mostly due to Lee's perceived autocratic style.

During the 1980s, the Fourth Labour Government under Prime Minister David Lange and Finance Minister Roger Douglas implemented several neoliberal economic reforms known as Rogernomics which transitioned New Zealand's Keynesian economy towards a more free market model. Labour's abandonment of its traditional values fractured the party, leading disaffected members to join Jim Anderton's NewLabour Party, Greens, New Zealand Democratic Party for Social Credit, and the Mana Motuhake parties under the Alliance. Successive Labour governments have promoted centre-left social and economic policies while preserving a free market economy. The former Prime Minister Jacinda Ardern identifies as a social democrat and formerly served as President of the International Union of Socialist Youth.

=== Rise of the Communist Party ===
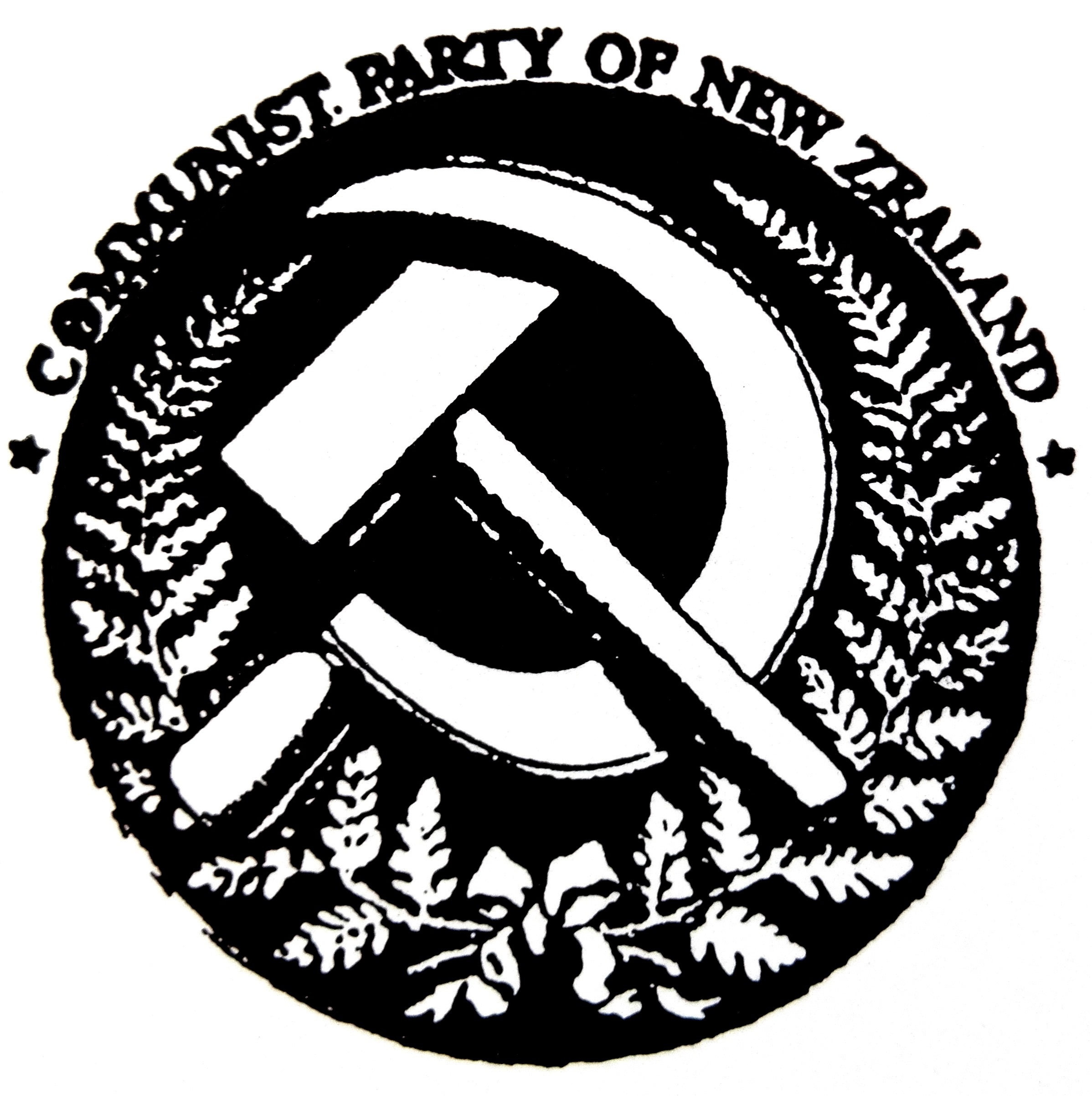
The Communist Party of New Zealand (logo pictured) existed between 1921 and 1994.

Even before Holland's replacement, and especially after Labour's 1949 policy change, many people had come to the conclusion that the Labour Party had moved too far away from its socialist roots. Only two years after Labour's foundation, the New Zealand Marxian Association was established. The Marxian Association was inspired by the Socialist Party of Great Britain (SPGB) and focused on political action. It would later clash acrimoniously with Holland. The Marxian Association itself would fall prey to internal division in 1921. That year, a number of members who supported the Russian Revolution departed to form the Communist Party of New Zealand (CPNZ). They were joined by two other revolutionary strands within the New Zealand Socialist Party: the De Lonites who espoused revolutionary politics and industrial unionism; and the Industrial Workers of the World (IWW)-syndicalist tradition who advocated direct action and spurned political activity.

In 1930, however, former members of the Marxian Association (backed by members of the Socialist Party of Australia (WSM)) established the Socialist Party of New Zealand (distinct from the earlier New Zealand Socialist Party). This group denied that the Labour Party (or even any of the parties before it, except for the Marxian Association) represented genuine socialism. The new Socialist Party still exists today, although has slightly modified its name, becoming the World Socialist Party).

Meanwhile, the CPNZ built its support from miners in the South Island's West Coast and Huntly in the North Island's Waikato district, and from seamen and waterside workers. The party faithfully followed the official position of the Soviet Union, modelling its aims, beliefs, manifesto and organisational structure and processes on those of the Communist Party of the Soviet Union (CPSU). The Soviets also sought to guide international Communist parties through the Third International or Comintern. In addition, the CPNZ also maintained close ties with the Communist Party of Australia (CPA) and supported Maori rights and the Mau movement in Western Samoa.

During the 1920s, the CPNZ and the Communist front organisation NZ-USSR Society attempted to influence the New Zealand trade union movement, workers, intellectuals and the New Zealand Labour Party to promote support for the Soviet Union and socialist policies. These attempts were largely unsuccessful and the Labour Party adopted a policy excluding all members of the CPNZ and Communist front organisations. This set the stage for enmity and rivalry between communists and social democratic parties over control of the trade unions and unemployed workers' movements during the Great Depression. Both communists and social democrats however did work together during the 1930s to combat fascism.

=== Communist offshoots ===
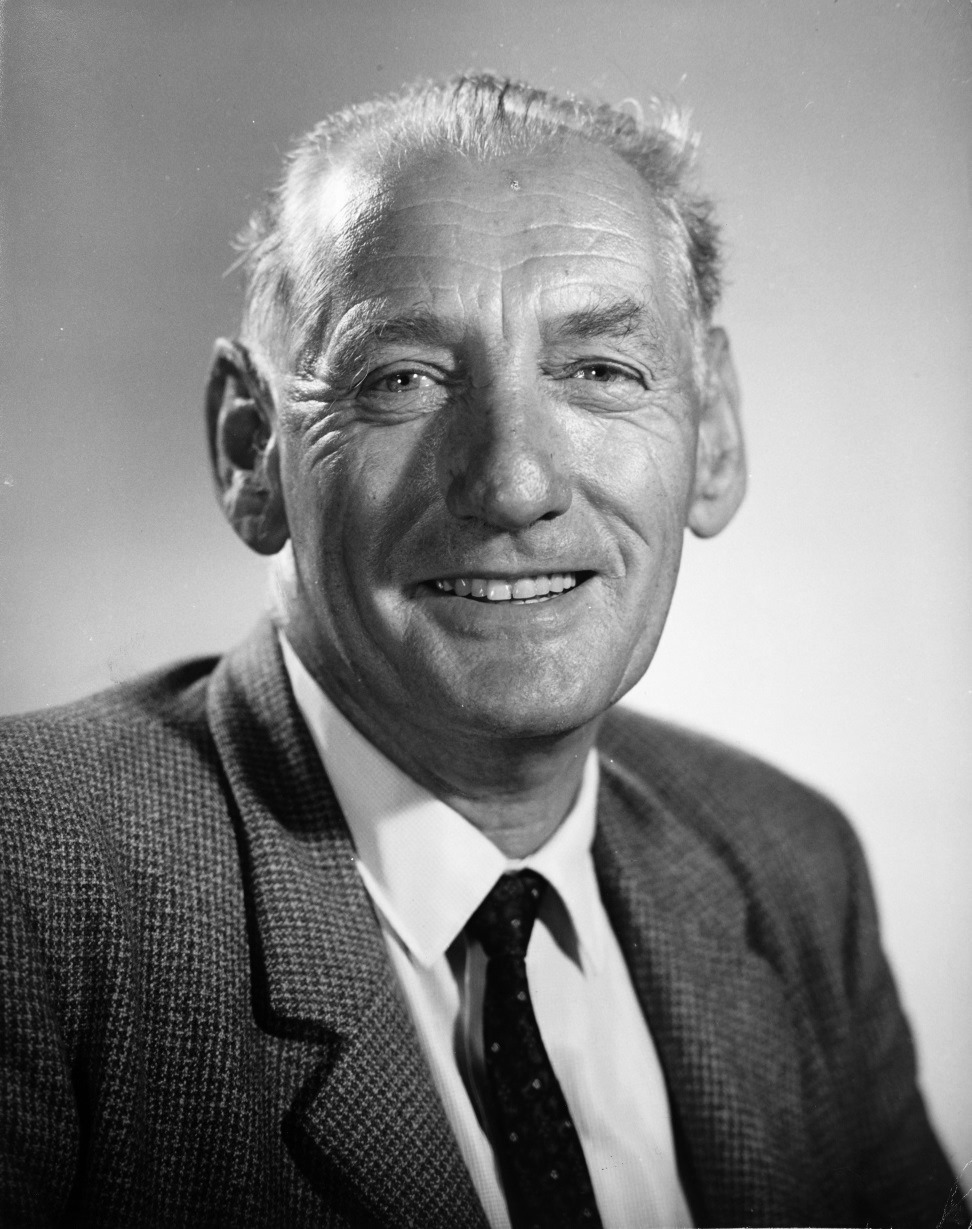
Vic Wilcox, pro-Maoist leader of the Communist Party

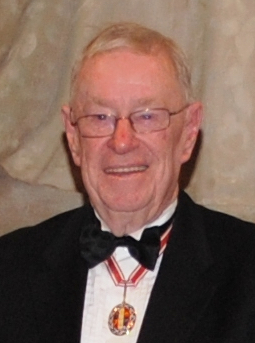
Ken Douglas, leader of the rival Socialist Unity Party

When the Sino-Soviet split occurred in the 1960s, the CPNZ was sharply divided between supporters of the Soviet Union (led by the "revisionist" Nikita Khrushchev) and supporters of China (led by the radical Mao Zedong). Eventually, the Maoists led by Vic Wilcox triumphed, and supporters of Khrushchev were expelled. Under Wilcox's leadership, the CPNZ was the only Western Communist party to side with China against the Soviets. The CPNZ's official mouthpiece was the People's Voice.

The expelled members led by Ken Douglas and George Harold (Bill) Andersen eventually established the Socialist Unity Party (SUP). The SUP supported the CPSU and Soviet Union until the collapse of the USSR in 1991, defending the Warsaw Pact invasion of Czechoslovakia in 1968, the suppression of the 1982 Solidarity demonstrations in Poland, and the Soviet–Afghan War. In return, Moscow funded frequent trips by SUP members to Russia, and Soviet ideologues and advisers regularly visited their SUP counterparts in New Zealand. The SUP's newspaper was called NZ Tribune. The Socialist Unity party eventually suffered its own split, with some members departing to found the modern Socialist Party of Aotearoa.

In 1969, a group called the Socialist Action League (now the Communist League) was established. The League emerged from student protests against the Vietnam War and was influenced by the theories of Leon Trotsky, Fidel Castro, and Che Guevera. The League took an interest in Communist movements in Cuba, Nicaragua, and the Philippines. Its newspaper was called Socialist Action. The League has proven to be one of the more durable parties and contested the 2017 Mount Albert by-election. Green Member of Parliament Keith Locke was once involved in the Socialist Action League.

After Mao's death, the CPNZ under the leadership of Richard Wolf and Harold Crook rejected the reforms introduced by Deng Xiaoping. Instead, they followed Albania, which was led by Enver Hoxha's Party of Labour of Albania. The leadership of the party believed that Hoxha was the only communist leader to keep "real" communism, but the group's determination to follow the narrowest path available alienated many of its supporters. The party gradually declined. Those CPNZ members who remained loyal to Beijing formed the Workers' Communist League, whose newspaper was called Unity.

During the Cold War, the CPNZ, SUP, Workers Communist League and the Socialist Action League tried to influence the Labour Party, trade unions, and a range of popular issues like the anti-Springbok tour protests, the Māori biculturalism, and the anti-nuclear movement.

Following the collapse of Albanian communism, the CPNZ adopted the Trotskyism it had once harshly condemned, and merged with a newer group known as the International Socialist Organization. The resultant party was called the Socialist Workers Organization. Later, however, many supporters of the International Socialist Organization withdrew from the new party, reestablishing their old group. As such, some see the Socialist Workers Organization (SWO) as a continuation of the old Communist Party. The SWO, known then as Socialist Worker, voted to dissolve itself in January 2012.

Other groups continue to promote socialism as well. In the 2002 election, four candidates were put forward an umbrella group (known as the Anti-Capitalist Alliance) consisting of the Workers Party of New Zealand, the Revolution group, and other left-wing activists. The International Socialist Organization is also active at some universities.

=== New Left variations ===
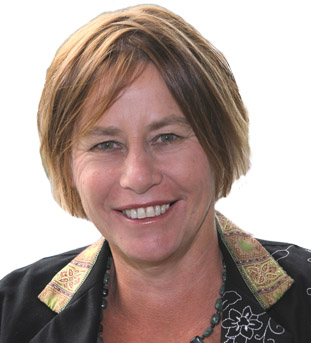
Former Green Member of Parliament Sue Bradford was also involved in the Auckland PYM and the Auckland Resistance bookshop during her youth.

The New Left in New Zealand emerged during the 1950s and 1960s in response to the perceived "authoritarian, bureaucratic, and repressive norms" of New Zealand society and the so-called conservatism of the Communist Party, Labour, and National parties. Eschewing the hierarchical structures of the "Old Left" political parties, the New Left developed informal groups that were non-sectarian, anti-bureaucratic, and decentralised. While the "Old Left" viewed the working class as the agent of revolutionary change, the New Left also saw revolutionary potential in Third World peasants, students, ethnic minorities and other marginalised groups. As with their New Left counterparts in Europe and North America, the New Left in New Zealand was largely young, white, male, middle-class, student-dominated, and incorporated a wide range of beliefs including the counter-culture movement, Christian pacifism, anarchism, neo-Leninism, and libertarian forms of Marxism. According to Boraman, the New Zealand New Left combined both the socialist orientation of the European New Left and the liberal orientation of its American counterpart.

New Left groups championed several causes included opposition to racism, the nuclear arms race, and the Vietnam War. Key New Left organisations in New Zealand were the anti-apartheid Halt All Racist Tours (HART), the Progressive Youth Movement (PYM), Socialist Forum, and the Resistance bookshops; which were organised locally. Unlike the Australian and American New Left groups, the Socialist Forum, PYM groups, and the Resistance bookshops were not university-based organisations but largely drew their support from working-class youth. The Wellington PYM consisted of a mixture of working-class youth and university students. Like the American New Left, the various PYM groups opposed the Vietnam War, racism, and Apartheid. While the New Zealand Campaign for Nuclear Disarmament (CND) was not a New Left organisation, several New Leftists including Graham Butterworth, Jim Delahunty, and Helmut Eionhorn of Wellington Socialist Forum also participated in the CND.

During the 1960s and 1970s, the New Left reached its heyday. HART, the PYM, and Resistance bookshops were joined by other groups including the Auckland University Society for the Active Prevention of Cruelty to Politically Apathetic Humans (AUSAPOCHPAH), the Auckland-based Friends of Brutus, the New Left Club at Massey University, the Victoria University Socialist Club, the Anarchist Congress in Wellington, the Radical Student's Alliance at the University of Canterbury, the Christchurch-based Anarchist Commune, the University of Otago's Progressive Left Club, and the Dunedin Anarchist Army. The activist, scholar, and Green Party Member of Parliament Sue Bradford was involved in the Auckland PYM and the Auckland Resistance bookshop.

Following the election of the Third Labour Government in 1972, the new government delivered many of the New Left's demands including withdrawing New Zealand troops from Vietnam in 1972; ending compulsory military training that same year; and terminating sporting contact with South Africa. As a result, the New Left lost much of its prominence due to the winding down of the protest movement. While New Leftists were still active in radical politics such as the Resistance bookshops, the more liberal wing of the protest movement had largely been appeased by the Third Labour Government's policies.

During the early to mid 1970s, some New Left elements like the Christchurch PYM became influenced by the Maoist Communist Party. One New Left group that emerged in 1974 was Murray Horton and Owen Wilkes' Campaign Against Foreign Control of Aotearoa, which campaigned against foreign military bases and economic activity in New Zealand. According to Boraman, several New Leftists including former PYM members were also instrumental in founding several social movement organisations during the 1960s and 1970s including Tama Poata's Māori Organisation on Human Rights (MOOHR), the Black Panthers–inspired Polynesian Panthers, Therese O'Connell's Wellington Women's Liberation Front, the Auckland Women's Liberation Front, and the Auckland–based Women for Equality. Boraman has characterized opposition to American imperialism and uncritical praise for Communist states and figures like Mao Zedong, Ho Chi Minh, and Che Guevara as two key defining features of the later New Left activists and groups.

=== Left-wing alternative media ===
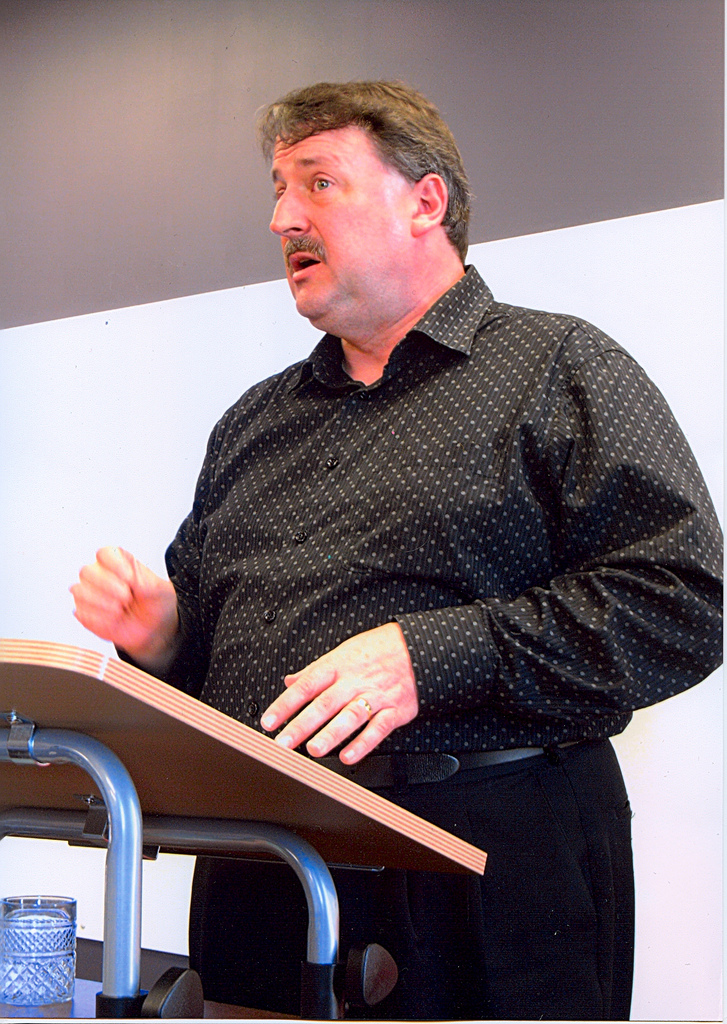
Chris Trotter, editor of the New Zealand Political Review

During the early 20th century, the emergence of working-class consciousness led to the formation of several left-wing newspapers including The Maoriland Worker (1910–1924), The Weekly Herald, The Transport Worker, and The New Zealand Watersider. During the 1930s, they were joined by activist theatre companies, politically engaged literary magazines, the Left Book Club, the Co-Operative Book Movement, and the Progressive Publishing Company. During the Great Depression, liberal-left perspectives penetrated mainstream New Zealand society through churches, women's groups, populist radio programmes, and the Labour Party.

The Maoriland Worker later revamped itself as the New Zealand Worker (1924–1935) and as the Labour Party's affiliated newspaper The Standard (1935–1959). While it was sympathetic to the Labour Party, the Maoriland Worker was a largely radical socialist publication that was independent of the Labour Party. The various Communist parties also published their own newspapers. The CPNZ's official organ was the People's Voice (1939–1991), which reached a peak of 14,000 copies in 1945. People's Voice was briefly replaced by Worker's Voice in the early 1990s. After the CPNZ transitioned into the Socialist Worker's Organisation it began publishing Socialist Worker (1994–2002), Socialist Worker Monthly Review (2002–2005), and finally Unity (2005–2010). The Socialist Unity Party's newspaper was the Tribune (1966–1995). The Worker's Party published The Spark (1991–2013), which was succeeded by Fightback (2013–present). The International Socialist Organisation published Socialist Review (1997–2022), followed by a successor The Socialist (?-present). The Socialist Action League's newspaper was Socialist Action (1969–1998), which reached a peak of 8,400 copies during the 1978 general election. The Workers' Communist League's newspaper was called Unity (1978–1990).

Several notable independent socialist magazines and newspapers in New Zealand have included the New Zealand Monthly Review (NZMR, 1960–1996), The Republican (1974–1996), Race Gender Class (1985–1992), left-wing journalist Chris Trotter's social democratic New Zealand Political Review (NZPR, 1992–2005), the feminist Broadsheet (1972–1997), the Peace Movement Aotearoa's Peacelink, the queer feminist Bitches, Witches and Dykes, the anti-apartheid HART News, CARP Newsletter, Foreign Control Watchdog, and Peace Researcher. Other independent left-wing publications have included the Marxist Publishing Group's Red Papers (1976–1979), The Paper (1973–1975), and the Victoria University Socialist Club's Red Spark (1969–1970).

Anarchists also published a number of magazines and newspapers over the years, such as The State Adversary, Thr@ll, Dissident Voice, Imminent Rebellion, and the anarcha-feminist Sekhmet.

== Contemporary socialist parties, groups, and media in New Zealand ==
There are around twenty political parties or organizations in New Zealand which follow socialist or communist policies. It is often difficult to gain a clear picture of socialist parties in New Zealand - mergers, splits, and re-namings leave the situation confused. In 2019 only Organise Aotearoa, the International Socialist Organisation, Socialist Aotearoa, the Canterbury Socialist Society, and the Communist Party of Aotearoa hold regular public meetings and maintain regularly updated websites.

=== Modern parties and organizations ===
- New Zealand Federation of Socialist Societies - a Non Sectarian Socialist organization focused on the educational advancement of Socialism and political engagement in the long term.
- Communist League - a formerly Trotskyist, Marxist-Leninist group established in 1969 as the "Socialist Action League". It has links to the Socialist Workers Party of the US. The Communist League had two candidates in the 2002 election, but neither won their respective races. The League also stood candidates in the 2010 Auckland council election.
- Communist Party of Aotearoa (2019) - a democratic socialist group based in Wellington with smaller branches around the country. Operates the Workers' Star newspaper and website. The main outlets of party work are the Hospo Workers Union and the Aotearoa Community Union. Originally known as the New Communist Party of Aotearoa.
- Communist Workers' Group - a Trotskyist group. It was established in 1995 as a splinter group from the Workers' Power organization. It is associated with the global Liaison Committee of Militants for a Revolutionary Communist International alliance, which itself was a split from the global alliance that Workers' Power belonged to. Their website is redrave.blogspot.co.nz.
- Fightback - formerly the Workers Party, which was previously the Anti-Capitalist Alliance. Branches in Wellington and Auckland and a monthly publication. Some members have worked as organisers for Unite Union. Fightback publishes a monthly magazine by the same name.
- International Socialist Organization - a revolutionary Trotskyist group that is particularly active in universities. It briefly attempted to merge with the remnants of the Communist Party of New Zealand, forming the Socialist Workers Organization. However, the majority of the group eventually rejected this decision and reestablished their own party but were now outside of the International Socialist Tendency. The ISO has fraternal relations with Socialist Alternative, in Australia, and the International Socialist Organisation, US. Branches in Auckland, Wellington and Dunedin. Bi-monthly magazine called Socialist Review.
- Organise Aotearoa – a revolutionary socialist group formed in 2016 and widely publicised in October 2018. Shortly after its public announcement, the organisation engaged in a series of direct action campaigns, including joining the blockade of New Zealand Defence Industry Association forums, occupying the Brazilian embassy after the inauguration of Jair Bolsonaro, occupying the United States consulate in Auckland during the 2019 Venezuelan coup d'état attempt, and joining the occupation of Ihumātao. The group has also organised broader mobilisations such as the 2018 protests agitating for abortion reform. As of June 2019, the organisation claims a membership of 272 active members. Branches in Auckland, Hamilton, Wellington, and Dunedin.
- Permanent Revolution Group - a Trotskyist group established as a breakaway from the Spartacist League (which later became the Workers' Power organization). It is associated with the International Bolshevik Tendency.
- Socialist Aotearoa - an Auckland-based group formed in May 2008 which split from Socialist Worker (Aotearoa) over disagreement with the organization's participation in the Residents Action Movement electoral coalition. The group has an eclectic mix of Trotskyists, anarchists, ecosocialists and various other ideologies in its ranks. Members are active in Unite Union, with one member, Joe Carolan, a senior organiser in that union.
- Socialist Voice - a Trotskyist group established in 2002. It is associated with the Committee for a Workers' International, and is therefore linked to the Socialist Party of England and Wales.
- Communist Party of Aotearoa - A Marxist-Leninist-Maoist party founded in 2018 in Auckland. The party seeks to establish Socialism and create a sustainable environment.

=== Defunct parties and organizations ===
- Socialist Party of Aotearoa - a Marxist-Leninist group. It was founded in 1990 as a split from the Socialist Unity Party, which was itself a split from the Communist Party of New Zealand.
- New Zealand Socialist Party (1901–1913) - an organization established in 1901. Not to be confused with the Socialist Party of New Zealand, a completely separate organization which is now known as the World Socialist Party.
- Communist Party of New Zealand (1921–1994) - an old communist group that initially gained a modest measure of success, but which later declined. The party became attached to Stalinism, and when the Sino-Soviet split occurred, the party adopted Maoism. Later, after Mao's death, it followed Enver Hoxha, leader of Albania (which they considered to be the last bastion of true communism). After the fall of Albania, the party renounced all these ideologies and adopted Trotskyism. The party then attempted a merger with the International Socialist Organization, creating the Socialist Workers Organization. Most of the International Socialists eventually withdrew from this coalition, leaving the new Socialist Workers Organization dominated by the former Communist Party.
- World Socialist Party (1930–??) - a group based primarily around opposition to Leninism. It was originally established in 1930 simply as the "Socialist Party of New Zealand", but later added "world" to its name. It is affiliated with the World Socialist Movement.
- Socialist Unity Party (1966–1990) - a pro-Soviet party established by expelled members of the Communist Party. The Communist Party had been split between supporters of the Soviet Union and supporters of Mao Zedong's China, and the pro-Soviet faction eventually lost. The Socialist Unity party survived until relatively recently, and maintained a relatively high level of influence in the trade union movement.
- Socialist Worker (Aotearoa) (?–2012). A revolutionary socialist group aligned with the International Socialist Tendency. Formerly known as the Socialist Workers Organisation, the final conference of SW voted to dissolve itself at its conference in January 2012.
- Workers Party of New Zealand (2002–2013) - The party was founded in 2002. It was originally formed by an electoral alliance of the original Workers' Party (pro-Mao, Marxist-Leninist) and the pro-Trotsky Revolution group. it is the first, and so far only, registered hard left political party under mixed-member proportional (MMP) representation.
- Black Cat BlackCat Anarchist Collective - an anarcho-communist group based in the city of Auckland.
- Communist Party of Aotearoa - a Maoist group that split from the Communist Party of New Zealand in 1993, condemning that organisation's abandonment of Maoism and adoption of Trotskyism.
- Revolutionary Communist League of New Zealand founded in 1984 by students and lecturers at the University of Canterbury in Christchurch. It was a revolutionary Marxist group affiliated with the United Secretariat of the Fourth International. After a few conferences, intending to rally opposition to Rogernomics, RCLNZ organized a larger nationwide grouping called Socialist Alliance which stood a candidate in the 1987 general election. The RCLNZ was transformed into the Socialist Workers' Project in 1990, based in the ChCh Centre for Socialist Education.
- New Zealand Marxian Association - a group established in 1918. It was founded to give endorsement and support to "Marxian Revolutionist" candidates in general elections.
- Organisation for Marxist Unity - a Maoist group.
- Revolutionary Workers League - a merger of the pro-Mao, Marxist-Leninist Workers' Party of New Zealand and the Revolution group. A tendency within the modern Workers' Party of New Zealand.
- Socialist Workers Organization - a revolutionary Trotskyist party. It was established by the Communist Party of New Zealand and the International Socialist Organization, although the majority of the latter group eventually withdrew from the merger. It was linked to the International Socialist Tendency. It evolved into the present-day Socialist Worker (Aotearoa) group.
- Workers' Party of New Zealand (pro-Mao, Marxist-Leninist) - A pro-Mao, Marxist-Leninist party founded by Ray Nunes, formerly a prominent member of the Communist Party of New Zealand. The party joined the Anti-Capitalist Alliance (ACA), a radical-left electoral alliance, in 2002. The Workers' Party merged with Revolution to become the Revolutionary Workers' League in 2004.
- Workers' Power - a Trotskyist group formed in 1981 with links to the global Workers' Power entity. It later absorbed a group called the "Communist Left". It is linked to the League for a Fifth International.

=== Contemporary left-wing media ===
With the advent of the Internet during the 1990s and early 21st century, left-wing print media gave way to online alternative media, which were cheaper to produce. Notable left-wing New Zealand blogs have included the independent Marxist collective "Redline", "Against the Current", Martyn Bradbury's current affairs–oriented The Daily Blog (2012–present), and The Standard. Besides blogs, left wing alternative media have also utilised email newsletters, publishing software, and major social media platforms like YouTube, Facebook, and Twitter.

== Prominent figures in New Zealand socialism ==
- Martyn Bradbury
- Sue Bradford
- Peter Fraser
- Harry Holland
- Edward Hunter (aka "Billy Banjo")
- John A. Lee
- Tama Poata
- Michael Joseph Savage
- Bob Semple
- Chris Trotter
- Owen Wilkes

== Prominent figures in New Zealand communism ==
- George Harold (Bill) Andersen
- Ken Douglas
- Elsie Locke
- Vic Wilcox

== See also ==
- Socialism in Australia
