= List of New Zealand left-wing activists =

This is a list of left-wing activists in New Zealand.

== Living ==
- Sue Bradford, ex Green Party of New Zealand, ex Unemployed Workers Movement
- Catherine Delahunty, Green Party of New Zealand
- Hone Harawira, ex Māori Party
- Laila Harré, National Distribution Union, ex New Zealand Nurses Organisation, Alliance Party, NewLabour Party, Labour Party
- Kassie Hartendorp
- Tame Iti, Tuhoe, Mana Maori, ex Communist Party of New Zealand
- Jane Kelsey
- Matt McCarten Unite Union, ex Alliance Party, NewLabour Party, Labour Party
- John Minto, Unite Union; Workers' Charter editor; Quality Public Education Coalition spokesperson; Halt All Racist Tours; Global Peace and Justice Auckland
- Grant Morgan, Socialist Worker (Aotearoa), Residents Action Movement, Workers' Charter
- Simon Oosterman, brother to Jonathan; Save Happy Valley Campaign, ex Supersizemypay.com, ex Unite Union, National Distribution Union
- Jill Ovens, Service & Food Workers Union, Alliance Party
- Nándor Tánczos, Green Party of New Zealand, ex Wild Greens, Aotearoa Legalise Cannabis Party, McGillicuddy Serious Party
- Luke Wijohn, Green Party of New Zealand

== Deceased ==
- Bill Andersen, National Distribution Union, Northern Drivers Union, Socialist Party of Aotearoa, Socialist Unity Party, Communist Party of New Zealand
- Bruce Jesson, author
- Pat Kelly, trade unionist
- Elsie Locke, communist writer, historian, activist in the feminism and peace movements
- Dean Parker, Workers' Charter
- Eva Rickard, Mana Maori, Mana Motuhake
- Sophia Lois Suckling, optician and family planning reformer.

== See also ==
- Socialism in New Zealand
