= Organise Aotearoa =

- Founded: October 2018 launch, with less formal meetings for two years prior
- Ideology: Revolutionary socialism Marxism; Tino rangatiratanga
- Political position: Far-left
- Colors: Red, black, white
- Slogan: For Decolonial Communism

Website
- organiseaotearoa.nz

Organise Aotearoa (founded 2018) is a New Zealand socialist organisation who describes itself as a movement "for decolonial communism". The organisation has an extra-parliamentary focus, and a membership composed of various prison-abolitionist, anti-imperialist and anti-poverty activists.

Shortly after its launch, the organisation engaged in a series of direct action campaigns, including joining the blockade of New Zealand Defence Industry Association forums, occupying the Brazilian embassy after the inauguration of Jair Bolsonaro, occupying the United States consulate in Auckland during the 2019 Venezuelan coup d'état attempt, and joining the occupation of Ihumātao. The group has also organised broader mobilisations such as the 2018 protests agitating for abortion reform.

== Principles and policies ==
Organise Aotearoa describes itself as "a new movement for liberation and socialism". In a statement of principles released on 1 October 2018, the organisation's policies were stated to be:

- Constitutional transformation, including decolonisation through the concepts of Tino Rangatiratanga, Tikanga and Mana motuhake;
- Socialist revolution in order to abolish capitalism and establish workplace democracy;
- Environmentalism through the abolition of corporate agency;
- Implementation of socialist policies and ending bourgeois control of the State;
- Ending violence against women, transphobia, racialisation in New Zealand prisons and ableism;
- Direct democracy;
- Anti-imperialism;
- Implementation of policy through direct action.

== History ==
=== Formation ===
Organise Aotearoa was first formed around Sue Bradford's Economic and Social Research Aotearoa (ESRA) think tank in 2016 and later expanded to include activists from People Against Prisons Aotearoa (PAPA), the Peace Action Movement and Auckland Action Against Poverty. The organisation also included Marxist-Leninists at the time of its public announcement. As of October 2019, the organisation claimed to have over 140 active members with branches in Auckland, Wellington, Hamilton and Dunedin.

=== Direct action protests ===
Organise Aotearoa has received media coverage in New Zealand and Brazil for their direct action interventions on several issues. Most notable among these was the occupation of the Brazilian embassy in Wellington to protest the inauguration of the far-right president Jair Bolsonaro. Occupiers displayed the slogan "No relations with fascist nations," and news of the occupation was widely shared by both left-wing and right-wing Brazilian media, including Carlos Bolsonaro, eventually going viral across the country. The subsequent backlash from the Brazilian right resulted in "thousands of homophobic insults, death threats, and rape threats [that were] sent to OA's supporters and members."

The group blockaded the New Zealand Defence Industry Association forum, or "Weapons Expo", in conjunction with the Peace Action Movement and Palmerston North locals. The 2018 blockade was considered successful by organisers, and resulted in arms industry delegates failing to attend the forum, as well as several arrests.

In February 2019, the organisation occupied the US Auckland consulate, and as of June 2019, has members involved in the indigenous land occupation at Ihumātao.

== See also ==
- Māori politics
- Revolutionary socialism
- Socialism in New Zealand
