= Anarchism in New Zealand =

The political philosophy of anarchism has had a small presence in New Zealand politics.

== History ==
Anarchism in early 20th century New Zealand was not yet a coherent, organised, or singular movement, instead it formed part of the wider labour movement in the country. Anarchist involvement in the New Zealand labour movement has been underrepresented in labour historiography, to the extent that anarchists and their activities are seldom mentioned and rarely covered in depth.

The loosely organised New Zealand Socialist Party was formed in 1901 and included syndicalists and anarchists. The Wellington group became a centre for anti-parliamentary socialists. It grew to 3000 members and held its first national conference in 1908. The conference condemns political action by a two to one majority.

In 1908, the International Workers of the World (IWW) established its first branch in New Zealand in Wellington. The International Workers of the World were later instrumental in the 1912 Waihi miners' strike.

Anarchists involved with the Christchurch branch of the Socialist Party, particularly its literature committee, left to form an Industrial Workers of the World Recruiting Union in 1910. This group became chartered in March 1912.

The Freedom Group was set up by Philip Josephs in Wellington in 1913 and lasted for a year.

In the 1950s, anarchist activity grew through protest movements and discussion groups.

In 1995, Freedom Shop was opened in Wellington. Freedom Shop became the longest running anarchist infoshop in New Zealand.

In October 2007, anarchists were some of the 16 people arrested during New Zealand's first nationwide antiterrorism raids.

=== Print culture ===
In the first decade of the 19th century, much of the socialist literature circulating in New Zealand, particularly in the South Island, was anarchist or revolutionary syndicalist. Anarchist literature was both sold and distributed In 1911, the Rationalist Association in Christchurch, which the member of parliament William Collins led, published a pamphlet about the Catalan anarchist Francisco Ferrer.

Social Democrat, the New Zealand Socialist Party's Auckland branch newspaper, included material by Emma Goldman and Pyotr Kropotkin. Publications such as the Social Democrat circulated anarchist news, developments, and debates both in New Zealand and internationally.

During the 1970s, three Resistance bookshops were established in New Zealand cities and became hubs for activity.

In 1987, anarchists in Auckland established State Adversary, a magazine which brought attention to anarchist news and discussions in New Zealand.

== See also ==
- Category:New Zealand anarchists
- Environmental movement in New Zealand
- Feminism in New Zealand
- Māori politics
- Republicanism in New Zealand
- Socialism in New Zealand
- Wanganui Computer Centre bombing
- Freedom Shop

== Bibliography ==
- Boraman, Toby (2008) [2007]. Rabble Rousers and Merry Pranksters: A History of Anarchism in Aotearoa/New Zealand From the Mid-1950s to the Early 1980s (PDF). Katipo Books and Irrecuperable Press. ISBN 978-0-473-12299-7. Archived from the original (PDF) on 4 October 2011.
- Davidson, Jared (2011). Remains to be Seen: Tracing Joe Hill's ashes in New Zealand. Wellington: Rebel Press. ISBN 978-0-473-18927-3.
- Prebble, Frank (1995). Troublemakers: Anarchism and Syndicalism – The Early Years of the Libertarian Movement in Aotearoa/New Zealand. Christchurch: Libertarian Press.
