= Electoral history of Walter Nash =

List of elections featuring Walter Nash as a candidate

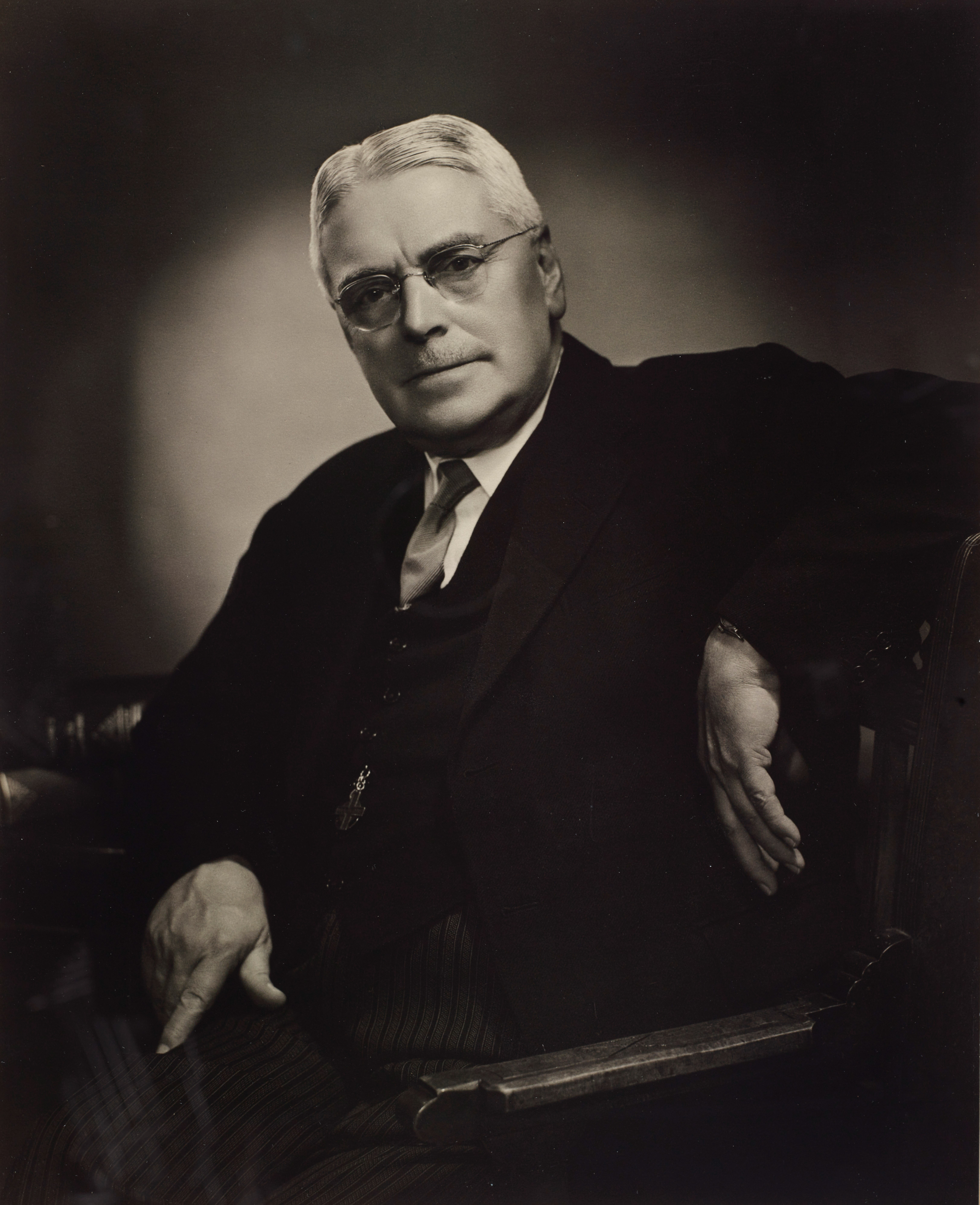
Walter Nash in the 1950s.

This is a summary of the electoral history of Walter Nash, Prime Minister of New Zealand (1957–60), Leader of the Labour Party (1951–63) and Member of Parliament for Hutt (1929–68).

== Parliamentary elections ==
=== 1925 election ===
1925 general election: Hutt
Party	Candidate	Votes	%	±%
Liberal	Thomas Wilford	6,080	58.13	+16.98
Labour	Walter Nash	4,286	40.98	
Informal votes		92	0.87	+0.01
Majority		1,794	17.15	+8.25
Turnout		10,458	91.04	−0.17
Registered electors		11,487		

=== 1928 election ===
1928 general election: Hutt
Party	Candidate	Votes	%	±%
United	Thomas Wilford	7,283	54.92	−3.21
Labour	Walter Nash	5,978	45.08	+4.10
Informal votes		288	2.13	+1.26
Majority		1,305	9.84	−7.31
Turnout		13,549	90.95	−0.9
Registered electors		14,898		

=== 1929 by-election ===
1929 Hutt by-election
Party	Candidate	Votes	%	±%
Labour	Walter Nash	5,047	40.53	−4.55
United	James Kerr (Note: For some biographical details of Kerr refer to his father's article.)	4,835	38.83	
Reform	Harold Johnston (Note: For some biographical details of Johnston refer to his father's article.)	2,570	20.64	
Majority		212	1.70	−8.14
Informal votes		103	0.82	−1.31
Turnout		12,555	84.27	−6.67
Registered electors		14,898		

Table footnotes:

=== 1931 election ===
1931 general election: Hutt
Party	Candidate	Votes	%	±%
Labour	Walter Nash	9,187	59.08	+18.54
United	James Kerr (Note: For some biographical details of James Kerr refer to his father's article.)	6,364	40.92	+2.09
Informal votes		116	0.74	
Majority		2,823	18.15	+16.45
Turnout		15,667	86.98	+3.39
Registered electors		18,013		

Table footnotes:

=== 1935 election ===
1935 general election: Hutt
Party	Candidate	Votes	%	±%
Labour	Walter Nash	11,873	74.25	+15.17
Reform	Victor Jacobsen	4,116	25.74	
Informal votes		243	1.51	+0.77
Majority		7,757	48.51	+30.36
Turnout		15,989	89.88	+2.90
Registered electors		17,788		

=== 1938 election ===
1938 general election: Hutt
Party	Candidate	Votes	%	±%
Labour	Walter Nash	10,687	72.84	−1.41
National	Jack Andrews	3,873	26.39	
Majority		6,814	46.44	+2.07
Informal votes		114	0.77	−0.74
Turnout		14,671	95.93	+6.05
Registered electors		15,292		

=== 1943 election ===
1943 general election: Hutt
Party	Candidate	Votes	%	±%
Labour	Walter Nash	8,823	60.87	+11.97
Real Democracy	John H. Hogan	3,563	24.58	
National	Norman Percival Croft	3,017	20.81	
Democratic Labour	Patrick Connors	437	3.01	
Informal votes		178	1.22	+0.45
Majority		5,260	36.29	−10.15
Turnout		16,018	93.93	−2.00
Registered electors		17,052		

=== 1946 election ===
1946 general election: Hutt
Party	Candidate	Votes	%	±%
Labour	Walter Nash	8,025	58.67	−2.20
National	Jim Vogel	5,438	39.76	
Independent Labour	George Laing	163	1.19	
World Socialist	Thomas Simpson	50	0.36	
Majority		2,587	18.91	−17.38
Turnout		13,676	92.80	−1.13
Registered electors		14,737		

=== 1949 election ===
1949 general election: Hutt
Party	Candidate	Votes	%	±%
Labour	Walter Nash	8,153	57.68	−0.99
National	Horace Leonard Heatley	5,880	41.60	
World Socialist	Thomas Simpson	100	0.70	+0.34
Majority		2,273	16.08	−2.83
Turnout		14,133	91.29	−1.51
Registered electors		15,480		

=== 1951 election ===
1951 general election: Hutt
Party	Candidate	Votes	%	±%
Labour	Walter Nash	8,872	57.73	+0.05
National	Jack Andrews	6,424	41.80	
World Socialist	Thomas Simpson	71	0.46	−0.24
Majority		2,248	14.62	−1.46
Turnout		15,367	89.54	−1.75
Registered electors		17,161		

=== 1954 election ===
1954 general election: Hutt
Party	Candidate	Votes	%	±%
Labour	Walter Nash	8,371	60.26	+2.53
National	Clevedon Costello	4,690	33.76	
Social Credit	Terry Maddison	829	5.96	
Majority		3,681	26.50	+11.88
Turnout		13,890	88.24	−1.30
Registered electors		15,740		

=== 1957 election ===
1957 general election: Hutt
Party	Candidate	Votes	%	±%
Labour	Walter Nash	8,975	62.63	+2.37
National	Lance Adams-Schneider	4,545	31.72	
Social Credit	Donald Milne	808	5.63	
Majority		4,430	30.91	+4.41
Turnout		14,328	93.15	+4.91
Registered electors		15,381		

=== 1960 election ===
1960 general election: Hutt
Party	Candidate	Votes	%	±%
Labour	Walter Nash	7,614	54.26	−8.37
National	George Barker	5,265	37.52	
Social Credit	Donald Milne	997	7.10	+1.47
Independent	George Wain	115	0.81	
Communist	Ralph Hegman	40	0.28	
Majority		2,349	16.74	−14.17
Turnout		14,031	89.30	−3.85
Registered electors		15,712		

=== 1963 election ===
1963 general election: Hutt
Party	Candidate	Votes	%	±%
Labour	Walter Nash	8,865	58.61	+4.35
National	Vere Hampson-Tinadale	5,217	34.49	
Social Credit	Donald Milne	972	6.42	−0.68
Majority		3,648	24.11	+7.37
Turnout		15,125	89.25	−0.05
Registered electors		16,945		

=== 1966 election ===
1966 general election: Hutt
Party	Candidate	Votes	%	±%
Labour	Sir Walter Nash	7,861	51.70	−6.91
National	John Kennedy-Good	5,912	38.88	
Social Credit	Christina Dalglish	1,431	9.41	
Majority		1,949	12.81	−11.30
Turnout		15,204	86.78	−2.47
Registered electors		17,520		

== Local elections ==
=== 1929 local elections ===
1929 Wellington City mayoral election
Party	Candidate	Votes	%	±%
Civic League	George Troup	14,528	60.82	+6.37
Labour	Walter Nash	9,142	38.27	
Informal votes		214	0.89	
Majority		5,386	22.55	+13.64
Turnout		23,884	51.55	−3.31

=== 1933 local elections ===
Wellington Harbour Board, Hutt
Party	Candidate	Votes	%	±%
Labour	Walter Nash	6,593	79.44	
Labour	Mark Fagan	3,003	36.18	
Citizens'	Colin Francis Post	2,546	30.67	
Citizens'	Herbert George Teagle	2,373	28.59	
Independent	Archibald Walker	1,888	22.74	
Informal votes		196	2.36	
Turnout		8,299		

=== 1935 local elections ===
Wellington Harbour Board, Hutt
Party	Candidate	Votes	%	±%
Labour	Walter Nash	8,312	81.06	+1.62
Labour	Mark Fagan	5,498	53.61	+17.43
Legion	Jack Andrews	4,109	40.07	
Independent	Alexander Anderson	2,454	23.93	
Informal votes		136	1.32	−1.04
Turnout		10,254		

== Leadership elections ==
=== 1940 Deputy-leadership election ===
Candidate	Votes	%
Walter Nash	51	100.00
Turnout	51	—

=== 1951 Leadership election ===
Candidate	Votes	%
Walter Nash	34	100.00
Turnout	34	—

=== 1954 Leadership election ===
Candidate	Votes	%
Walter Nash	17	56.67
Arnold Nordmeyer	9	30.00
Abstentions	4	13.33
Majority	6	20.00
Turnout	30	—
