= Solidarity union (disambiguation) =

Solidarity union may refer to:

== Trade unions ==
- Solidarity unionism, a model of labor union organizing
- Solidarity Union, a trade union in New Zealand
- Solidarity (British trade union), a trade union in the United Kingdom
- Solidarity (Polish trade union), a trade union in Poland
- Solidarity (South African trade union), a trade union in South Africa

== Other ==
- Taiwan Solidarity Party, a political party in Taiwan formerly known as the Taiwan Solidarity Union
- Non-Partisan Solidarity Union, a political party in Taiwan
