= International Socialist Organisation (New Zealand) =

International Socialist Organisation of Aotearoa (New Zealand)
- Leader: Coordinating Committee: Serah Alison, Brad Aldridge, Oscar Bartle, Brandon Johnstone
- Governing body: National conference/Hui-a-tau.
- Founded: Early 1990s
- Newspaper: The Socialist
- Ideology: Anti-capitalism; Revolutionary socialism Trotskyism; Marxism
- Political position: Left-wing

Website
- www.iso.org.nz

The International Socialist Organisation is a Trotskyist organisation in New Zealand.

The founders of the ISO in New Zealand, notably Brian Roper and Laurel Hepburn, were active in the International Socialist Organisation in Australia, a section of the International Socialism current. Returning to New Zealand, they formed the Dunedin-based ISO in the early 1990s. The organisation played a leading role in the student protest movement of the early 1990s.

As a result of its own development, the Communist Party of New Zealand was also attracted to the International Socialism current, and developed links with the British Socialist Workers Party, the leading representative of that current. This meant that there were two competing representatives of the same political ideology in New Zealand, which led to the SWP brokering a fusion between the two groups.

The ISO and CPNZ fused in the 1990s to form the Socialist Workers Organization. However, a majority of the former ISO soon left as a result of what were seen as Stalinist practices on the part of the former CPNZ leadership. The ISO then resumed its separate existence, and expanded from Dunedin to form a branch in Wellington. The Wellington branch reopened in 2012 after being closed for several years. An Auckland branch was established in 2013. Branches in all three centres continue to function, with strong orientation around the university campuses.

The ISO's publication, The Socialist, has been produced sporadically over the lifetime of the organisation. It passed its 50th issue in 2014.

The ISO has been active in anti-war campaigns, environmental campaigns, and union work (with the Unite Union, the Engineering, Printon and Manufacturing Union, the Public Service Association and the Tertiary Education Union). In the 2011 election, the ISO supported the Mana Party. The ISO was part of the Mana movement, until democratic consensus determined that the ISO would withdraw from the Mana movement in early 2015

The ISO has close ties with Socialist Alternative in Australia.

== See also ==
- International Socialist Tendency
