= Politics of New Zealand =

Organisational chart of the New Zealand political system

The politics of New Zealand function within a framework of an independent, unitary, parliamentary democracy. The system of government is based on the Westminster system, and the legal system is modelled on the common law of England. New Zealand is a constitutional monarchy in which King Charles III is the sovereign and head of state, while his prime minister serves as the head of government.

The New Zealand Parliament holds legislative power and consists of the King and the House of Representatives. The King is represented by the governor-general when not present in the country himself. Members of Parliament (MPs) are each elected to the House of Representatives for a flexible term of office, with general elections held at least every three years using a mixed-member proportional (MMP) system. MPs usually belong to political parties. New Zealand has a multi-party system, though the dominant parties have historically been the Labour Party and the National Party (or its predecessors). Minority governments are common and typically dependent on confidence-and-supply agreements with other parties in the House of Representatives.

Executive power in New Zealand is based on the principle that while the King reigns, the Government rules. Although an integral part of the process of government, the King and his governor-general remain politically neutral and are not personally involved in the everyday aspects of governing. The New Zealand Government exercises authority on behalf of and by the consent of the sovereign. The government is made up of ministers, who are selected from among MPs and accountable to Parliament. Most ministers are members of the Cabinet, which is the main decision-making body of the Government. It is headed by the prime minister, who is the most senior minister formally appointed by the governor-general. Other ministers are appointed by the governor-general on the advice of the head of government.

According to the V-Dem Democracy Indices New Zealand was the sixth-most electoral democratic country in the world in 2023. The country ranks highly for government transparency and had the second lowest perceived level of corruption in the world in 2022.

== Legal framework ==
New Zealand is a unitary parliamentary democracy under a constitutional monarchy. It has no formal codified constitution; the constitutional framework consists of a mixture of various documents (including certain acts of the United Kingdom and New Zealand Parliaments), the principles of the Treaty of Waitangi, and constitutional conventions. The Constitution Act in 1852 established the system of government and these were later consolidated in 1986. Constitutional rights are protected under common law and are strengthened by the New Zealand Bill of Rights Act 1990 and Human Rights Act 1993, although these are not entrenched and can be overturned by Parliament with a simple majority. The Constitution Act 1986 describes the three branches of government in New Zealand: the executive (the Sovereign and the Executive Council), the legislature (Parliament) and the judiciary (Courts).

== Legislature ==
Main office-holders
| Office | Name | Party | Since |
|---|---|---|---|
| King | Charles III | | 8 September 2022 |
| Governor-General | Dame Cindy Kiro | | 21 October 2021 |
| Speaker of the House | Gerry Brownlee | National | 5 December 2023 |
| Leader of the House | Chris Bishop | National | 27 November 2023 |

Parliament is responsible for passing laws, adopting the annual Budget, and exercising control of the executive government. It currently has a single chamber, the House of Representatives. Before 1951 there was a second chamber, the Legislative Council. The House of Representatives meets in Parliament House, Wellington.

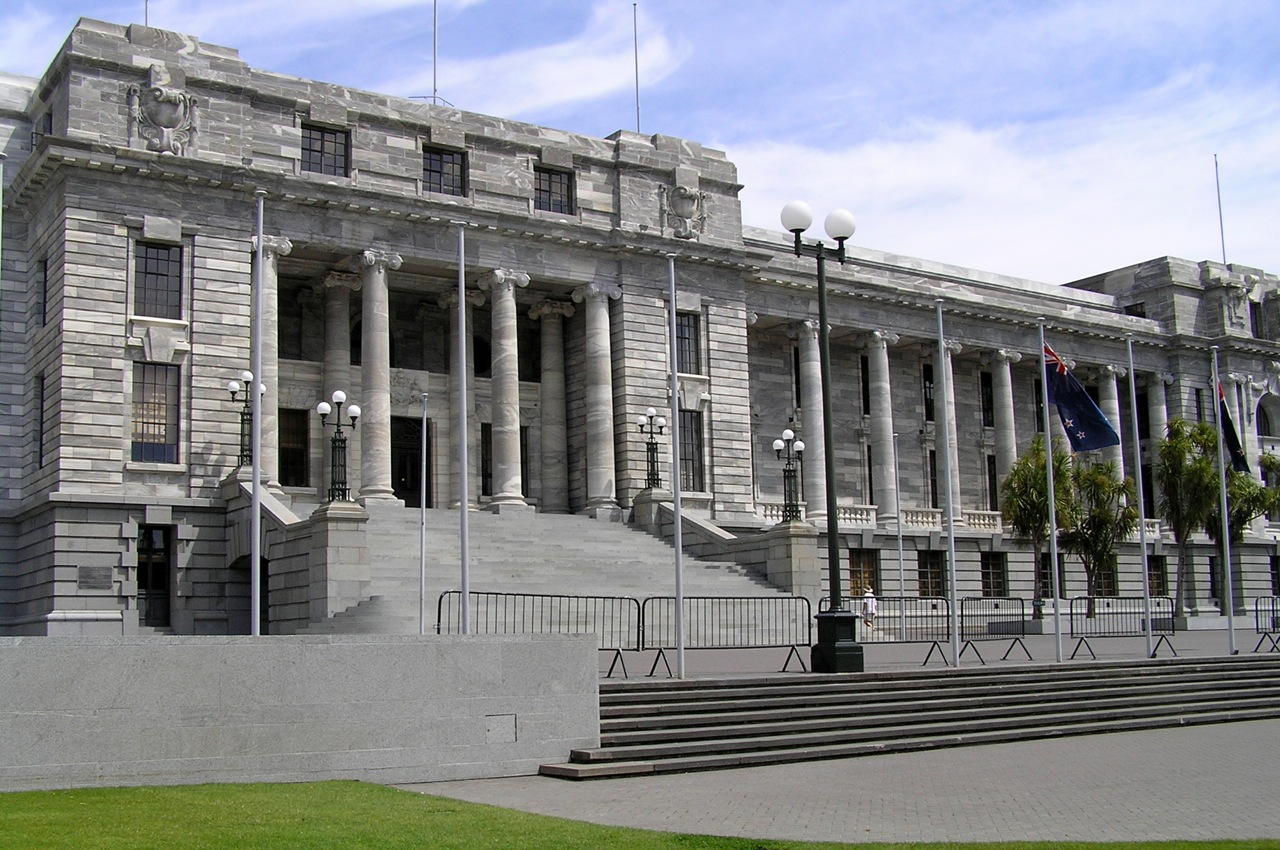
Parliament House is the home of the House of Representatives.

Laws are first proposed to the House of Representatives as bills. They have to go through a process of approval by the House and governor-general before becoming acts of Parliament (i.e. statutory law).

The lawmakers are called members of Parliament, or MPs. Parliament is elected for a maximum term of three years, although an election may be called earlier in exceptional circumstances. Suffrage is nearly universal for permanent residents eighteen years of age and older, women having gained the vote in 1893. As in many other parliamentary systems of government, the executive (called "the Government") is drawn from and is answerable to Parliament—for example, a successful motion of no confidence will force a government either to resign or to seek a parliamentary dissolution and an early general election.

=== Elections ===
Almost all parliamentary elections between 1853 and 1996 were held under the first past the post (FPP) electoral system. Under FPP the candidate in a given electorate (district) that received the most votes was elected to the House of Representatives. The only deviation from the FPP system during this time occurred in the 1908 and 1911 elections when a second-ballot system was used; the second-ballot legislation was repealed in 1913. The elections since 1935 have been dominated by two political parties, National and Labour.

Public criticism of the FPP system began in the 1950s and intensified after Labour lost elections in 1978 and 1981 despite having more overall votes than National. An indicative (non-binding) referendum to change the voting system was held in 1992, which led to a binding referendum during the 1993 election. As a result, New Zealand has used the mixed-member proportional (MMP) system since 1996. Under MMP, each member of Parliament is either directly elected by voters in a single-member district via FPP or appointed from their party's list. Parliament normally has 120 seats, though some elections have resulted in overhang, as is currently the case (as of December 2023). In the first eight elections under MMP, from 1996 to 2017, no party won a majority of seats.

Seven electorates are reserved for MPs elected on a separate Māori roll. In 1967, the law was changed to allow Māori to stand for election in the general (non-reserved) electorates, resulting in many Māori entering Parliament outside of the reserved seats. Since 1975, all Māori have had the option to enrol to vote in either the reserved Māori electorates or general electorates.

=== Party politics ===
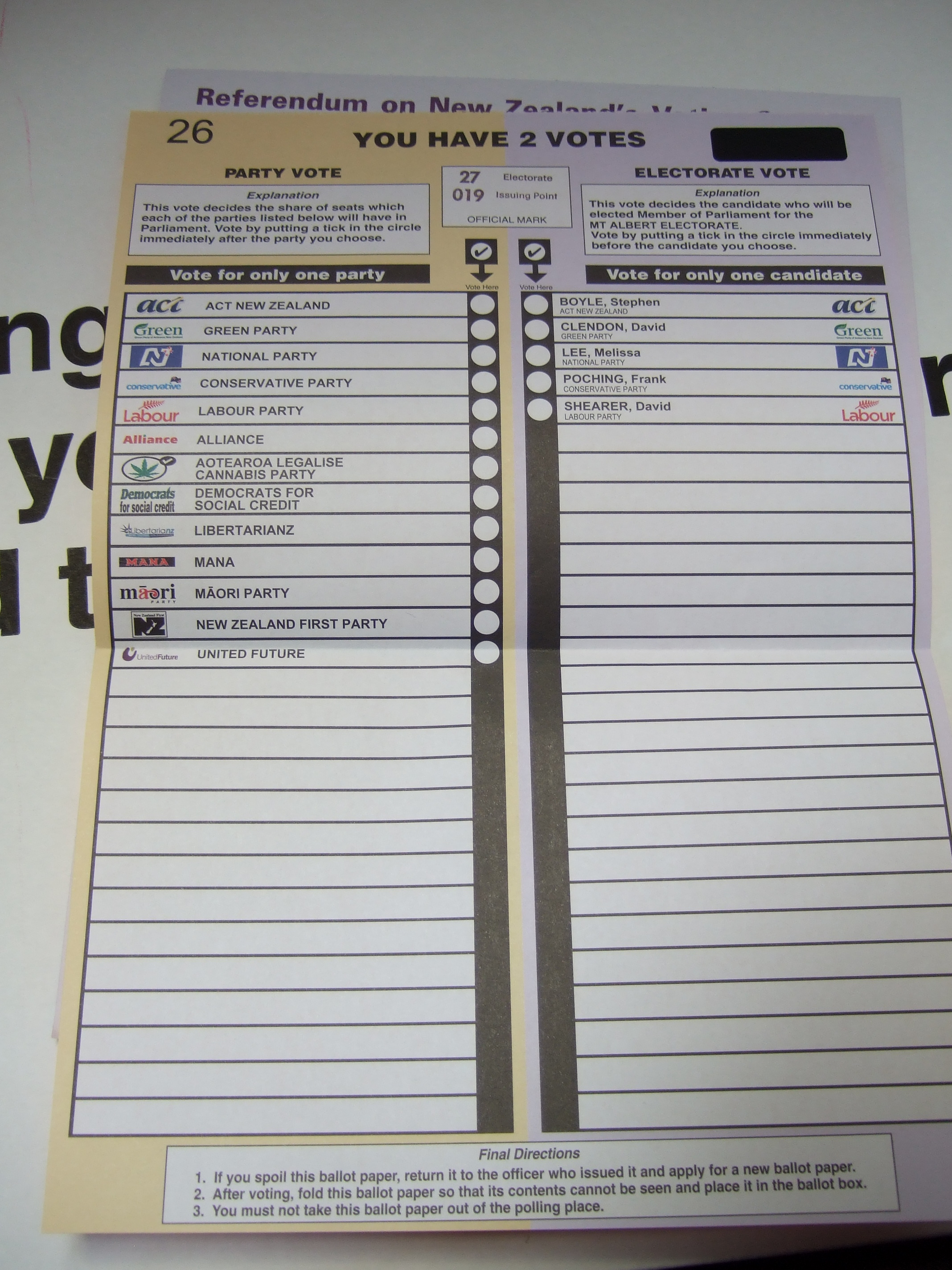
Ballot showing parties, 2011 general election

The first organised political party in New Zealand was founded in 1891, and its main rival was founded in 1909—New Zealand had a de facto two-party system from that point until the adoption of MMP in 1996. Since then New Zealand has been a multi-party system, with at least five parties elected in every general election since. By rarely producing an overall majority for one party, MMP also ensures that parties need to agree with other parties to pass laws. In the late 1990s, a phenomenon called "waka-jumping" emerged as MPs increasingly switched their party allegiance while in Parliament, prompting the implementation of a 2001 law mandating the resignation of waka-jumping MPs; this legislation expired in 2005, but a renewed effort to prevent waka-jumping emerged with the passage of the Electoral (Integrity) Amendment Act 2018.

Historically the two largest, and oldest, parties are the New Zealand Labour Party (formed in 1916) and the New Zealand National Party (formed in 1936). Labour has generally positioned itself as centre-left in New Zealand politics, and has featured socialist (historically) and social-democratic principles in its platform and legislation, while National has generally positioned itself as centre-right, and has liberal and conservative tendencies. Other smaller parties represented in Parliament, following the October 2023 general election, are the ACT Party (right-wing, classical-liberal and conservative), the Green Party (left-wing, green politics), New Zealand First (right-wing, populist and nationalist), and Te Pāti Māori (left-wing, Māori rights-based).

Parties must register with the Electoral Commission in order to contest the party vote in an election.

The table below summarises the results of the latest general election.

Summary of the 14 October 2023 election for the House of Representatives
| Party | Party vote | | | | Electorate vote sum | | | | Total seats | +/- |
| Party | Votes | Of total (%) | Change (pp) | Seats | Votes | Of total (%) | Change (pp) | Seats | Total seats | +/- |
|---|---|---|---|---|---|---|---|---|---|---|
| National | 1,085,851 | 38.08 | ▲12.51 | 5 | 1,192,251 | 43.47 | ▲9.34 | 43 | 48 | ▲16 |
| Labour | 767,540 | 26.92 | ▼23.09 | 17 | 855,963 | 31.21 | ▼16.86 | 17 | 34 | ▼31 |
| Green | 330,907 | 11.61 | ▲3.75 | 12 | 226,575 | 8.26 | ▲2.52 | 3 | 15 | ▲5 |
| ACT | 246,473 | 8.64 | ▲1.06 | 9 | 149,507 | 5.45 | ▲1.99 | 2 | 11 | ▲1 |
| NZ First | 173,553 | 6.09 | ▲3.49 | 8 | 76,676 | 2.80 | ▲1.73 | 0 | 8 | ▲8 |
| Te Pāti Māori | 87,844 | 3.08 | ▲1.92 | 0 | 106,584 | 3.89 | ▲1.73 | 6 | 6 | ▲4 |
| Opportunities (TOP) | 63,344 | 2.22 | ▲0.72 | 0 | 27,975 | 1.02 | ▲0.13 | 0 | 0 | Steady |
| NZ Loyal | 34,478 | 1.20 | new | 0 | 32,240 | 1.18 | new | 0 | 0 | new |
| NewZeal (Note: Formerly known as ONE Party.) | 16,126 | 0.56 | ▲0.28 | 0 | 3,585 | 0.13 | ▼0.11 | 0 | 0 | Steady |
| Legalise Cannabis | 13,025 | 0.45 | 0.00 | 0 | 12,566 | 0.46 | ▲0.17 | 0 | 0 | Steady |
| Freedoms NZ (Note: A coalition consisting of the Freedom and Rights Coalition, Vision NZ, the NZ Outdoors & Freedom Party, and a few other unregistered parties.) | 9,586 | 0.33 | ▲0.08 | 0 | | | | 0 | 0 | Steady |
| DemocracyNZ | 6,786 | 0.23 | new | 0 | 12,060 | 0.44 | new | 0 | 0 | new |
| Animal Justice | 5,018 | 0.17 | new | 0 | 5,829 | 0.21 | new | 0 | 0 | new |
| New Conservative | 4,532 | 0.15 | ▼1.32 | 0 | 3,167 | 0.12 | ▼1.64 | 0 | 0 | Steady |
| Women's Rights | 2,513 | 0.08 | new | 0 | 0 | 0.00 | new | 0 | 0 | new |
| Leighton Baker Party | 2,105 | 0.07 | new | 0 | 2,623 | 0.10 | new | 0 | 0 | new |
| New Nation | 1,530 | 0.05 | new | 0 | 433 | 0.02 | new | 0 | 0 | new |
| Unregistered parties | | | | | | | | | | |
| Independent | | | | | 34,277 | 1.25 | ▲0.87 | | | |
| Valid votes | 2,851,211 | | | | 2,742,677 | | | | | |
| Informal votes | 16,267 | | | | 40,353 | | | | | |
| Disallowed votes | 16,633 | | | | 59,043 | | | | | |
| Below electoral threshold | | | | | | | | | | |
| Total | 2,884,111 | 100.00 | | 51 | 2,842,073 | 100.00 | | 71 | 122 | |
| Eligible voters and turnout | 3,688,292 | 78.20 | ▼4.04 | | 3,688,292 | 77.06 | ▼5.18 | | | |

==== Party funding ====
In recent years, there has been a growing recognition of the importance of political party funding as a public policy concern. To address this, specific regulations have been implemented to set limits on foreign donations, ensuring that they do not exceed NZ$50 and placing restrictions on anonymous donations, which are limited to a maximum of NZ$1,500. These limitations aim to promote transparency and accountability in the political process by curbing the potential influence of foreign and anonymous contributions.

== Executive Government ==
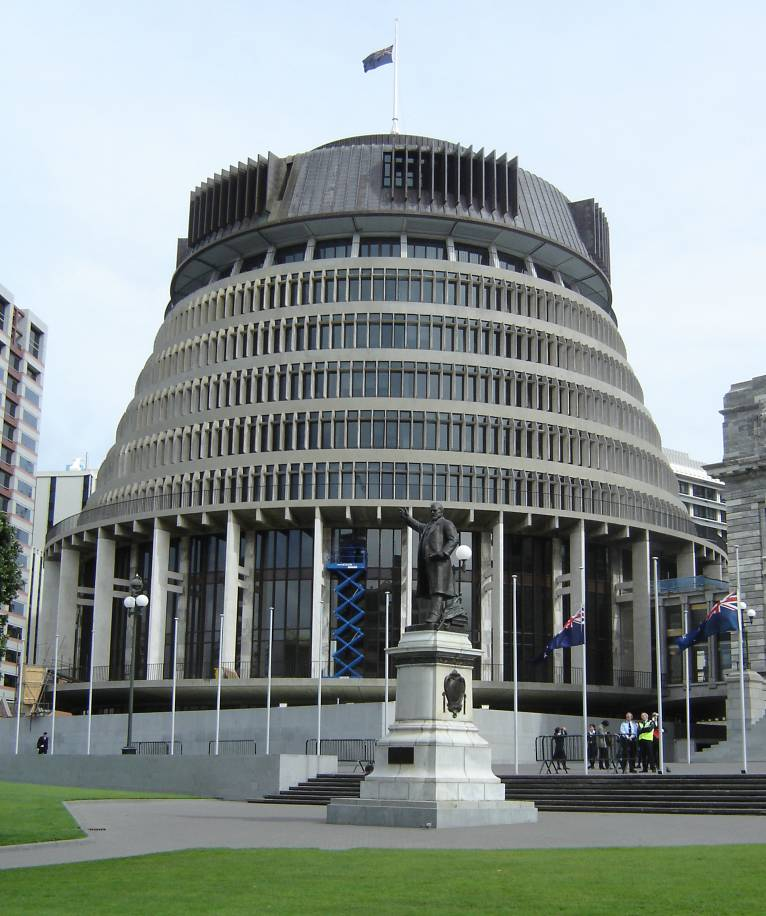
The Beehive is the seat of the New Zealand Government.

Main office-holders

The King of New Zealand:
Charles III
since
8 September 2022

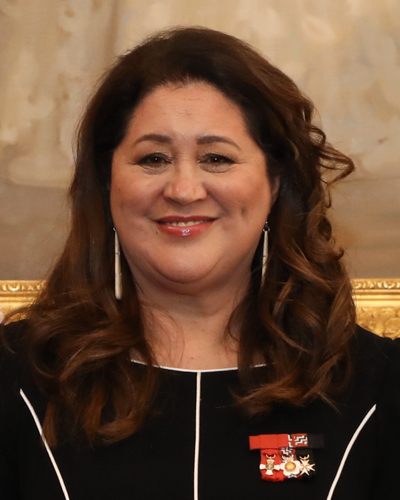
The Governor-General of New Zealand:
Dame Cindy Kiro
since
21 October 2021

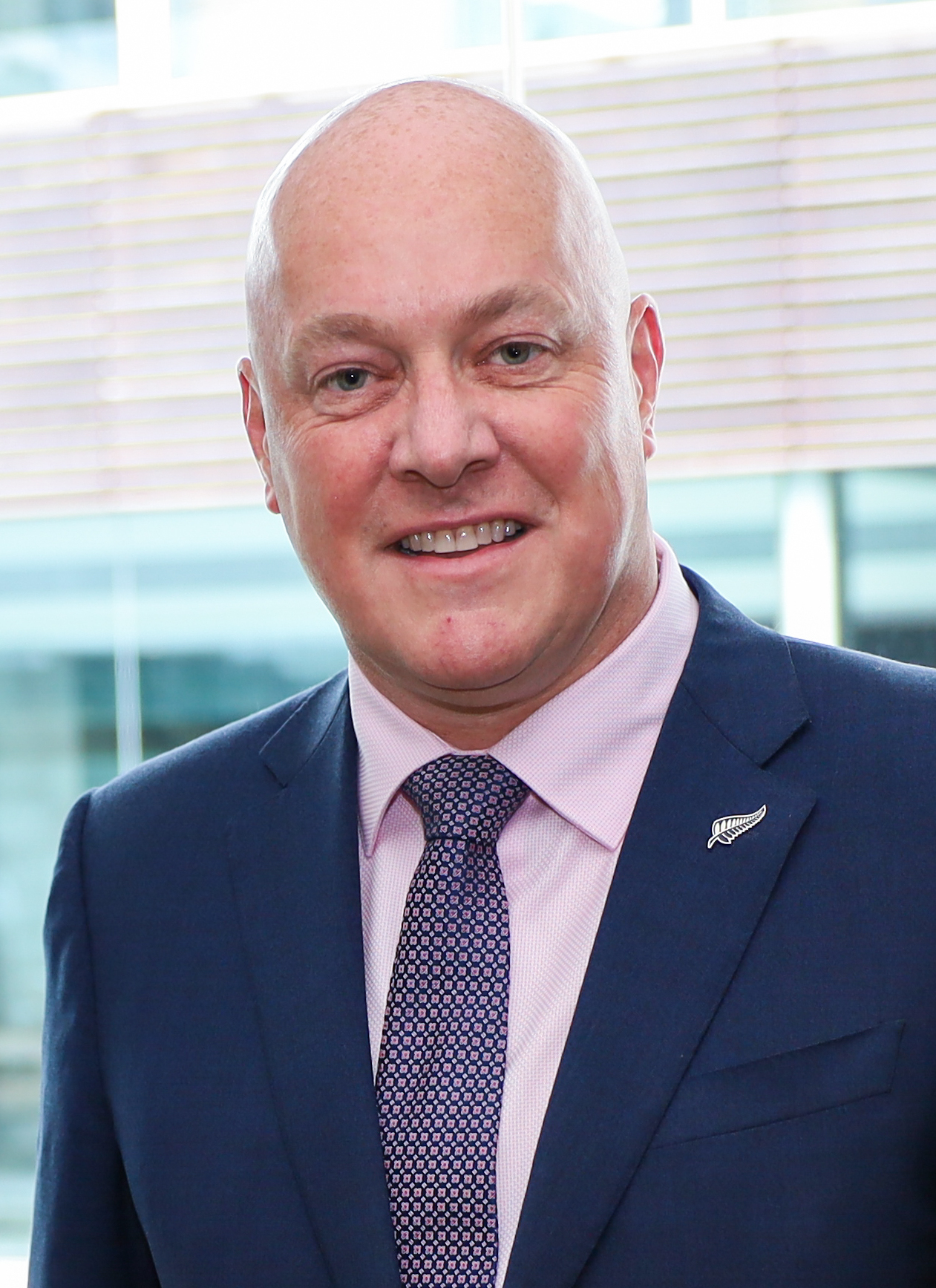
The Prime Minister of New Zealand:
Christopher Luxon
since
27 November 2023

King Charles III is New Zealand's sovereign and head of state. The New Zealand monarchy has been legally distinct from the British monarchy following the Statute of Westminster Adoption Act 1947, and all Charles III's official business in New Zealand is conducted in the name of the "King of New Zealand". The King's role is largely ceremonial, and his residual powers—called collectively the "royal prerogative"—are mostly exercised through the government of the day. These include the power to enact legislation, to sign treaties and to declare war.

Since the King is not usually resident in New Zealand, the functions of the sovereign are delegated to their representative, the governor-general. As of 2021, the incumbent Governor-General is Dame Cindy Kiro. A governor-general formally has the power to appoint and dismiss ministers and to dissolve Parliament; and the power to reject or sign bills into law by royal assent after passage by the House of Representatives. The governor-general chairs the Executive Council, which is a formal committee consisting of all ministers, who advise the governor-general on the exercising of the prerogative powers. Members of the Executive Council are required to be members of Parliament (MPs), and most are also in the Cabinet.

Cabinet is the senior decision-making body in Government, led by the prime minister (currently Christopher Luxon), who is also, by convention, the parliamentary leader of the largest governing party. The prime minister, being the de facto leader of New Zealand, exercises executive functions that are formally vested in the sovereign (by way of the prerogative powers). Ministers within Cabinet make major decisions collectively and are therefore collectively responsible for the consequences of these decisions.

For a government to be formed, typically following a general election, it must be able to command the support of the majority of MPs in the House of Representatives. This entails having their confidence and the ability to pass supply bills. While it is rare for a single party to have an outright majority, coalitions may be formed between parties; even if a single party or coalition lacks a majority, it can form a Cabinet with agreed confidence and supply from minor parties. After a government is formed, it also requires practical support from a majority for government bills to be enacted. Parties in government are said to have a "mandate" from voters and authority to implement manifestos (although this view has been criticised as being simplistic when applied to coalition arrangements). The National Party won the largest number of seats in the 2023 general election and, following negotiations, formed a majority three-party coalition government with the ACT and NZ First parties.

Since November 2023, the Labour Party has formed the Official Opposition to the National–ACT–NZ First Government. The leader of the Opposition heads a Shadow Cabinet, which scrutinises the actions of the Cabinet led by the prime minister. The Opposition within Parliament helps to hold the Government to account through parliamentary questions, non-government bills, and the possibility of no-confidence motions.

== Judiciary ==
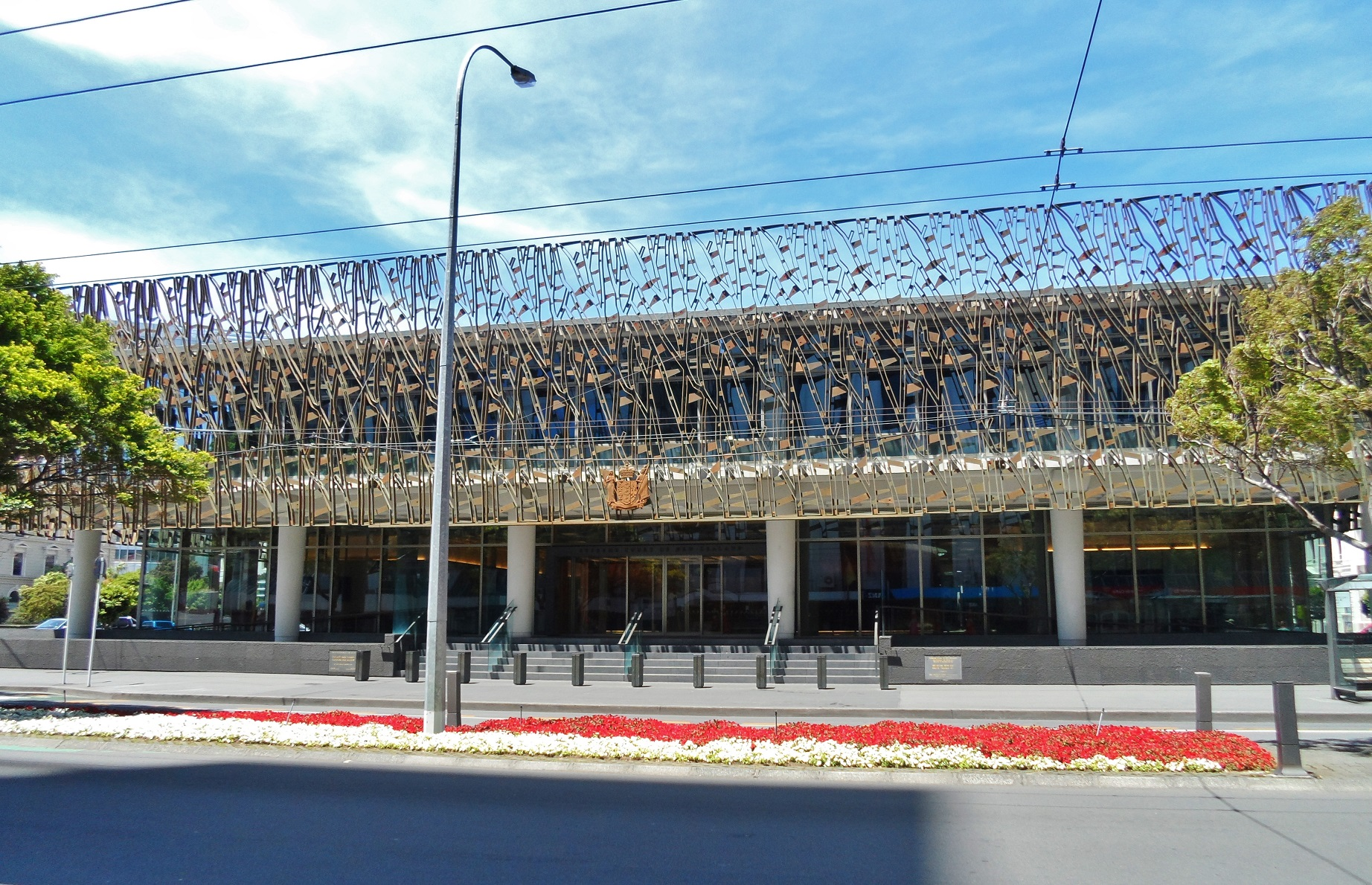
The Supreme Court building, Wellington

The New Zealand judiciary has four basic levels of courts:

- The Supreme Court;
- the Court of Appeal;
- the High Court;
- and the District Court (including the Youth Court).

The Supreme Court was established in 2004, under the Supreme Court Act 2003, and replaced the Privy Council in London as New Zealand's court of last resort. The High Court deals with serious criminal offences and civil matters, and hears appeals from subordinate courts. The Court of Appeal hears appeals from the High Court on points of law.

The chief justice, the head of the judiciary, presides over the Supreme Court and is appointed by the governor-general on the advice of the prime minister. As of 2019 the incumbent Chief Justice is Dame Helen Winkelmann. All other superior court judges are appointed on the advice of the chief justice, the attorney-general, and the solicitor-general. Judges and judicial officers are appointed non-politically and under strict rules regarding tenure to help maintain judicial independence from the executive government. Judges are appointed according to their qualifications, personal qualities, and relevant experience. A judge may not be removed from office except by the attorney-general upon an address of the House of Representatives for proved misbehaviour.

New Zealand law has three principal sources: English common law, certain statutes of the United Kingdom Parliament enacted before 1947 (notably the Bill of Rights 1689), and statutes of the New Zealand Parliament. In interpreting common law, the courts have endeavoured to preserve uniformity with common law as interpreted in the United Kingdom and related jurisdictions.

== Local government ==
New Zealand is a unitary state rather than a federation—local government has only the powers conferred upon it by the national Parliament. These powers have traditionally been distinctly fewer than in some other countries; for example, police and education are run by central government. Local government is established by statute, with the first Municipal Corporations Act having been passed by the Legislative Council in 1842. Local governance is currently defined by the Local Government Act 2002.

Local elections are held every three years to choose regional, city and district councillors, including mayors, and community board members.

== Foreign relations ==
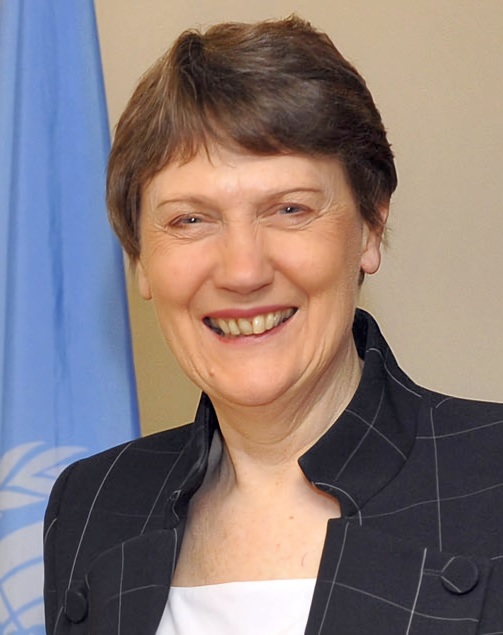
Former New Zealand Prime Minister Helen Clark served as administrator of the United Nations Development Programme, a senior official at the UN, from 2009 to 2017.

New Zealand maintains a network of 32 embassies, 20 high commissions and 95 consulates abroad, and holds relations with about 150 countries. New Zealand is involved in the Pacific Islands Forum, the Pacific Community, Asia-Pacific Economic Cooperation, the East Asia Summit, and the ASEAN Regional Forum. It is a member of the Commonwealth of Nations, Organisation for Economic Co-operation and Development (OECD), and a founding member of the United Nations (UN). New Zealand is party to a number of free-trade agreements, most prominently Closer Economic Relations with Australia and the New Zealand–China Free Trade Agreement.

Historically New Zealand aligned itself strongly with the United Kingdom and had few bilateral relations with other countries. In the later 20th century, relationships in the Asia-Pacific region became more important. New Zealand has also traditionally worked closely with Australia, whose foreign policy followed a similar historical trend. In turn, many Pacific Islands (such as Samoa) have looked to New Zealand's lead. A large proportion of New Zealand's foreign aid goes to these countries and many Pacific people migrate to New Zealand for employment. Despite the 1986 rupture in the ANZUS military alliance (as a result of New Zealand's nuclear-free policy), New Zealand has maintained good working relations with the United States and Australia on a broad array of international issues.

== Political culture ==
Political change in New Zealand has been gradual and pragmatic, rather than revolutionary. The nation's approach to governance has emphasised social welfare, and multiculturalism, which is based on immigration, social integration, and suppression of far-right politics, that has wide public and political support. New Zealand is regarded as one of the most honest countries in the world, and it was ranked first in the world in 2017 for lowest perceived level of corruption by the organisation Transparency International. Democracy and rule of law are founding political principles in New Zealand. Early European settlers believed that traditional British legal principles (including individual title to land) would be upheld in New Zealand. The nation's history, such as the legacy of the British colonial rule evidenced in the Westminster system, continues to have an impact on political culture, despite New Zealand's political independence. As at 2021, New Zealand is identified as a "full democracy" in the Economist Intelligence Unit's Democracy Index. The country rates highly for civic participation in the political process, with 82% voter turnout during recent elections, compared with the OECD average of 69%.

Human rights remain a central focus in New Zealand politics, with a strong commitment to ensuring the protection and promotion of individual freedoms and equality. However, the New Zealand Human Rights Commission asserts there is clear evidence that structural discrimination is a real and ongoing socioeconomic issue, exemplified by Māori overrepresentation in the criminal justice system, comprising 45% of convicted individuals and 53% of those imprisoned. Political redress for historical grievances is also ongoing.

Since the 1970s, New Zealand has shown a more socially liberal outlook. Beginning with the decriminalisation of same-sex sexual activity in 1986, successive governments have progressively increased the protection of LGBT rights, culminating in the legalisation of same-sex marriage in 2013. In 2020, the Abortion Legislation Act, which fully decriminalised abortion in New Zealand, was supported by members across all parties in Parliament.

The idea of serving as a moral example to the world has been an important element of New Zealand national identity. The opposition to apartheid in South Africa in the 1970s and 1980s, protests against French nuclear testing at Moruroa atoll in the 1970s, and popular support for New Zealand's anti-nuclear policy in the 1980s are manifestations of this. From the 1990s New Zealand's anti-nuclear position has become a key element of government policy (irrespective of party) and of the country's "distinctive political identity".

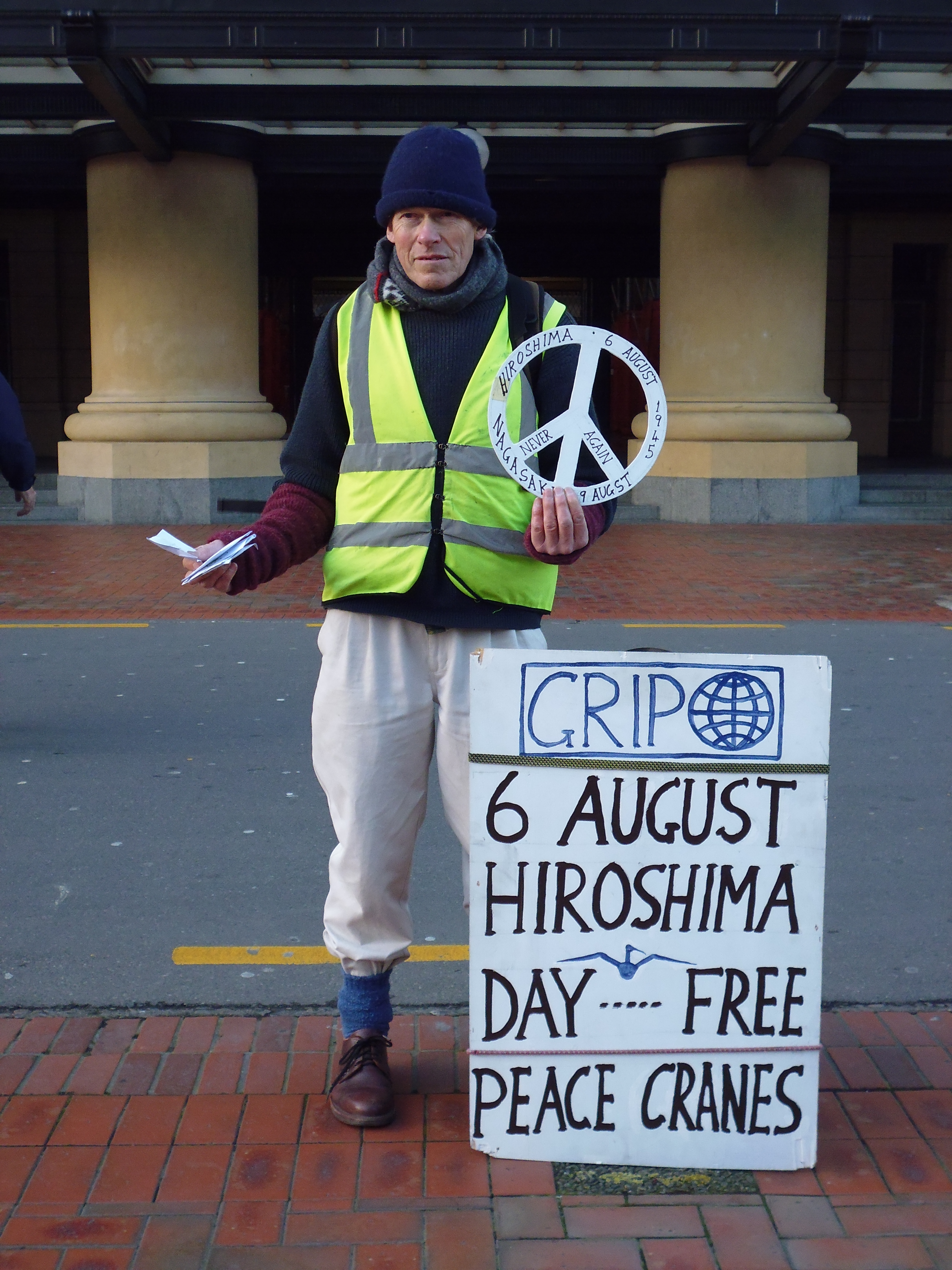
An anti-nuclear activist hands out peace cranes in Wellington. New Zealand's foreign policy is often symbolised by its anti-nuclear stance.

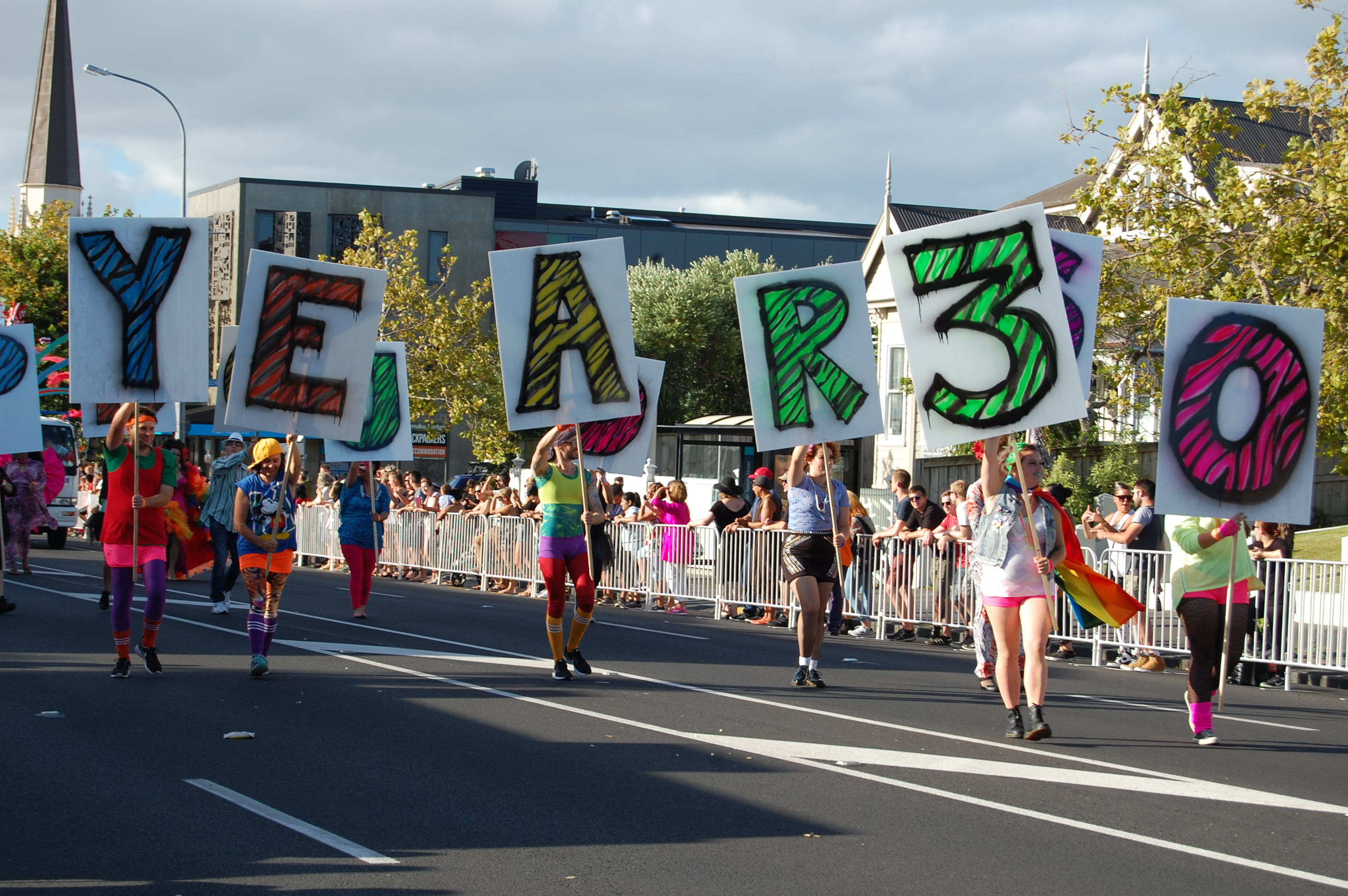
Commemorating the 30th anniversary of Homosexual Law Reform at the 2016 Auckland Pride Festival

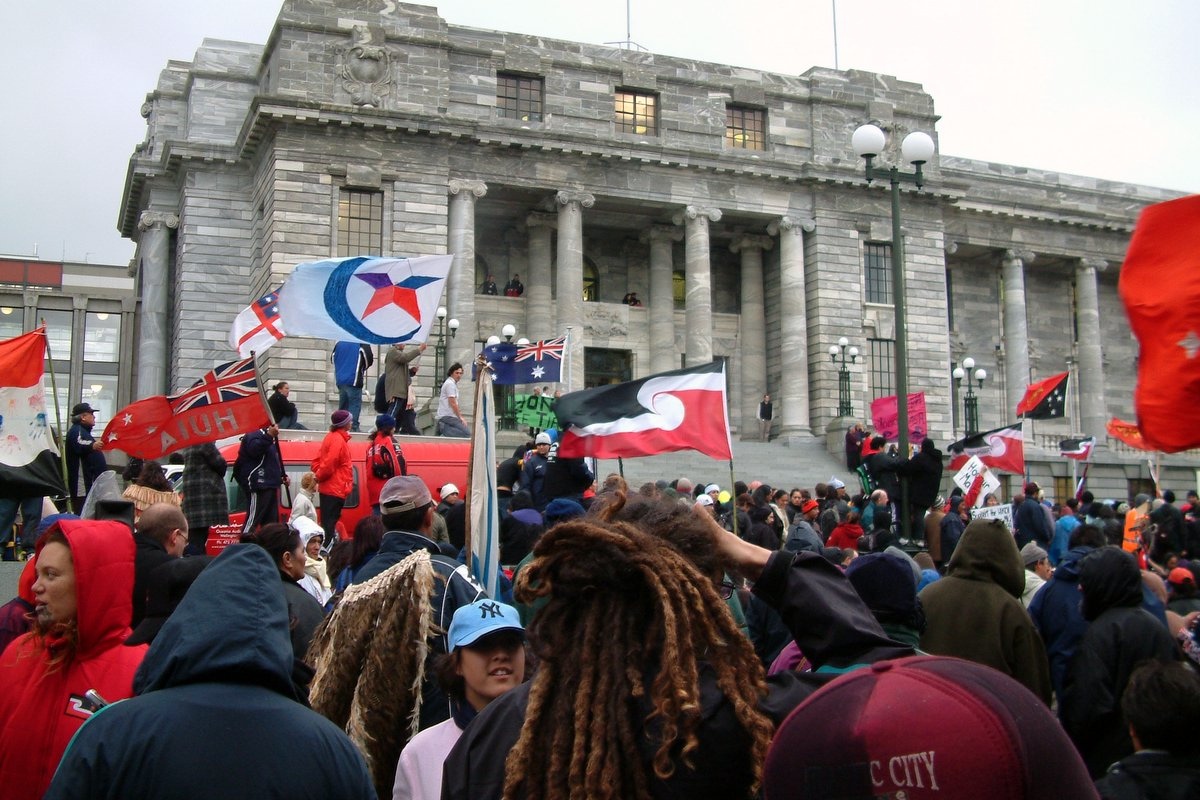
A hīkoi protest outside Parliament Buildings over the foreshore and seabed controversy, 2004

An opinion poll found the most important political issues in 2026 were inflation, cost of living, healthcare, economy, housing and crime.

== History ==
=== Pre-colonial politics ===
Before New Zealand becoming a British colony in 1840, politics in New Zealand was dominated by Māori chiefs as leaders of hapū and iwi, utilising Māori customs as a political system. The Māori were organised into large, extended family groups known as iwi, and these iwi were further divided into smaller hapū (subtribes). Each hapū had its own leadership structure, with chiefs (rangatira) who were responsible for the well-being and governance of their people.

=== Colonial politics ===
Manuscript copy of the Treaty of Waitangi in Māori

After the Treaty of Waitangi was signed in 1840, a colonial governor and his small staff acted on behalf of the British Government based on the British political system. Māori systems had dominated until 1840, and governors attempting to introduce British systems met with mixed success in Māori communities. More isolated Māori were little influenced by the Government. Most influences were felt in and around Old Russell, the first capital, and Auckland, the second capital.

The first voting rights in New Zealand were legislated in the New Zealand Constitution Act 1852, for the 1853 elections, and reflected contemporary British practice. The electoral franchise was limited to property-owning male British subjects over 21 years old. The property qualification was relatively liberal compared to Britain, such that by the late 1850s 75% of adult New Zealand European males were eligible to vote, compared to 20% in England and 12% in Scotland. Around 100 Māori chiefs voted in the 1853 election. Like British practice at the time, New Zealand's first election used a mixture of single-member districts and multi-member districts, the first using first-past-the-post voting and the second group using plurality block voting.

During the 1850s provincial-based government was the norm. Provincial councils were abolished in 1876. Politics was initially dominated by conservative and wealthy "wool lords" who owned multiple sheep farms, mainly in Canterbury. During the gold rush era starting 1858 suffrage was extended to all British gold miners who owned a one-pound mining license. The conservatives had been influenced by the militant action of gold miners in Victoria at Eureka. Many gold miners had moved to the New Zealand fields bringing their radical ideas. The extended franchise was modelled on the Victorian system. In 1863 the mining franchise was extended to goldfield business owners. In 1870, the number of registered voters was only 41,500, but an additional 20,000 miners were also entitled to vote.

After the brief Land War period ending in 1864, Parliament moved to extend the franchise to more Māori. Donald McLean introduced a bill for four temporary Māori electorates and extended the franchise to all Māori men over 21 in 1867. As such, Māori were universally franchised 12 years before European men.

In 1879 an economic depression hit, resulting in poverty and many people, especially miners, returning to Australia. Between 1879 and 1881 Government was concerned at the activities of Māori activists based on confiscated land at Parihaka. Activists destroyed settlers' farm fences and ploughed up roads and land, which incensed local farmers. Arrests followed but the activities persisted. Fears grew among settlers that the resistance campaign was a prelude to armed conflict. The Government itself was puzzled as to why the land had been confiscated and offered a huge 25,000-acre reserve to the activists, provided they stopped the destruction. Commissioners set up to investigate the issue said that the activities "could fairly be called hostile". A power struggle ensued resulting in the arrest of all the prominent leaders by a large government force in 1881. Historian Hazel Riseborough describes the event as a conflict over who had authority or mana—the Government or the Parihaka protestors.

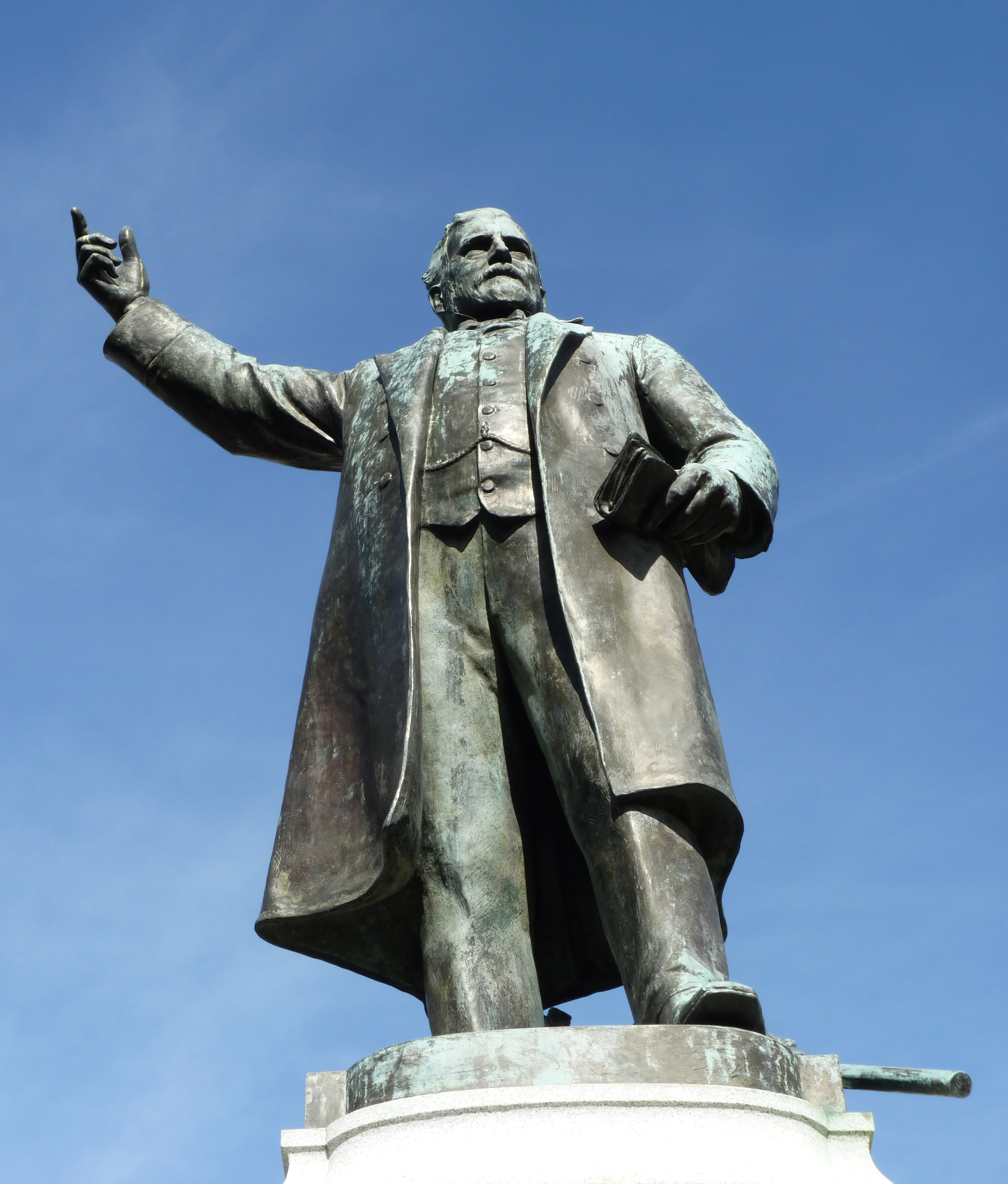
Richard Seddon's statue stands outside Parliament buildings in Wellington.

In 1882 the export of meat in the first refrigerated ship started a period of sustained economic export-led growth. This period is notable for the influence of new social ideas and movements such as the Fabians and the creation in 1890 of the first political party, the Liberals. Their leader, former gold miner Richard Seddon from Lancashire, was premier from 1893 to 1906. The Liberals introduced new taxes to break the influence of the wealthy conservative sheep farm owners. They also purchased more land from Māori. (By 1910, Māori in parts of the North Island retained very little land, and the amount of Māori land would decrease precipitously as a result of government purchases.)

The early 20th century saw the rise of the trade union movement and labour parties, which represented organised workers. The West Coast town of Blackball is often regarded as the birthplace of the labour movement in New Zealand, as it was the location of the founding of one of the main political organisations which became part of the New Zealand Labour Party.

=== Māori politics and legislation ===
Māori political affairs have been developing through Resource Management Act 1991 and the Te Ture Whenua Māori Act 1993 and many other new laws. Since colonisation in the 1800s, Māori's customary laws have been oppressed, with the imposition of a Westminster democracy and political style. Seeing the hardships caused by the colonial war and general discrepancies during colonisation, the New Zealand Government has formally apologised and made reparations to those iwi affected, through settlements and legislation. In the 1960s Māori Politics Relations began to exhibit more positivity. The legislature enacted a law to help Māori retrieve back their land, not hinder them, through the Māori Affairs Amendment Act 1967. Since then, this progressive change in attitude has materialised as legislation to protect the natural environment or Taonga, and the courts by establishing treaty principles that always have to be considered when deciding laws in the courts. Moreover, the Māori Lands Act 2016 was printed both in te reo Māori and English—the act itself affirms the equal legal status of te reo.

=== Women in politics ===
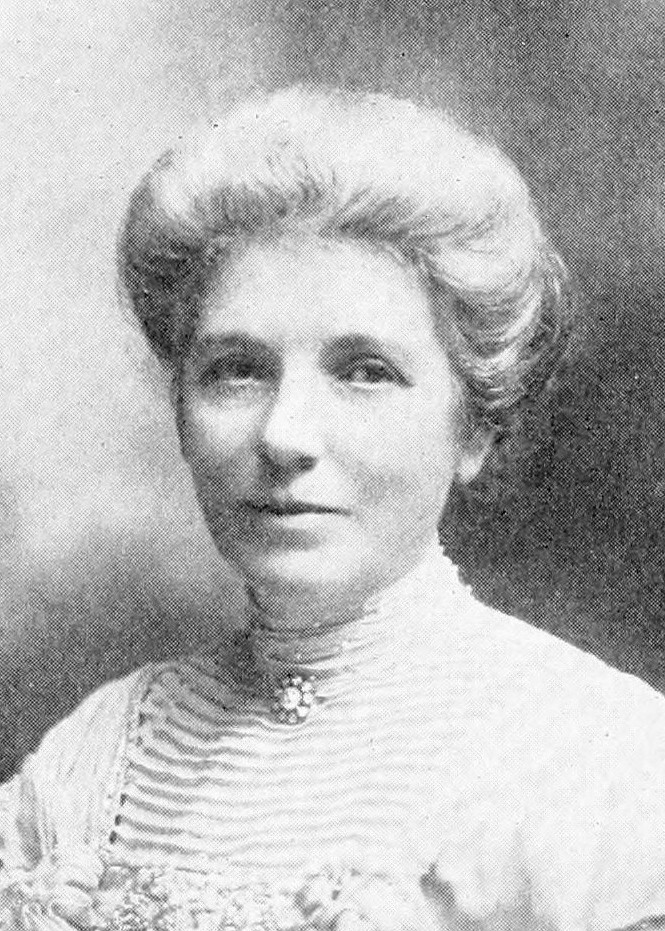
Kate Sheppard is the country's most famous suffragist.

Women's suffrage was granted after about two decades of campaigning by women such as Kate Sheppard and Mary Ann Müller and organisations such as the New Zealand branch of the Women's Christian Temperance Union. On 19 September 1893 the governor, Lord Glasgow, signed a new Electoral Act into law. As a result, New Zealand became the first self-governing nation in the world in which all women had the right to vote in parliamentary elections. Women first voted in the 1893 election, with a high 85% turnout (compared to 70% of men). The achievement of women's suffrage in New Zealand was groundbreaking, as most other democracies did not grant women the right to vote until after World War I.

Women were not eligible to be elected to the House of Representatives until 1919 though, when three women, including Ellen Melville stood. The first woman to win an election (to the seat held by her late husband) was Elizabeth McCombs in 1933. Mabel Howard became the first female cabinet minister in 1947, being appointed to the First Labour Government.

New Zealand was the first country in the world in which all the highest offices were occupied by women, between March 2005 and August 2006: the Sovereign Queen Elizabeth II, Governor-General Dame Silvia Cartwright, Prime Minister Helen Clark, Speaker of the House Margaret Wilson, and Chief Justice Dame Sian Elias.

After the 2020 election, women made up half of the 120 MPs in the House of Representatives, marking the highest level of women's political representation since they were first allowed to stand for Parliament in 1919.

=== Modern political history ===
The right-leaning National Party and the left-leaning Labour Party have dominated New Zealand political life since a Labour government came to power in 1935. During fourteen years in office (1935–1949), the Labour Party implemented a broad array of social and economic legislation, including comprehensive social security, a large-scale public works programme, a forty-hour working week, and compulsory unionism. The National Party won control of the government in 1949, accepting most of Labour's welfare measures. Except for two brief periods of Labour governments in 1957–1960 and 1972–1975, National held power until 1984.

The greatest challenge to the first and later Labour governments' policies on the welfare state and a regulated economy that combined state and private enterprise came from the Labour Party itself. After regaining control in 1984, the fourth Labour government instituted a series of radical market-oriented reforms. It privatised state assets and reduced the role of the state in the economy. It also instituted several other more left-wing reforms, such as allowing the Waitangi Tribunal to hear claims of breaches of the Treaty of Waitangi to be made back to 1840. In 1987, the government introduced the New Zealand Nuclear Free Zone, Disarmament, and Arms Control Act, banning visits by nuclear powered ships; the implementation of a nuclear-free zone brought about New Zealand's suspension from the ANZUS security alliance with the United States and Australia.

In October 1990, the National Party again formed a government, for the first of three three-year terms. Despite election promises to halt the unpopular reform process, the new National government largely advanced the free-market policies of the preceding government. Public disillusionment resulting from perceived "broken promises" of the previous two governments fuelled demand for electoral reform in New Zealand. In 1996, New Zealand inaugurated the new electoral system (mixed-member proportional representation, or MMP) to elect its Parliament. The MMP system was expected (among numerous other goals) to increase representation of smaller parties in Parliament and appears to have done so in the MMP elections to date. Between 1996 and 2020, neither National nor Labour had an absolute majority in Parliament, and for all but two of those years a minority government ruled (however, every government has been led by one or other of the two main parties).

MMP parliaments have been markedly more diverse, with greater representation of women, ethnic minorities and other minority groups. In 1996, Tim Barnett was the first of several New Zealand MPs to be elected as an openly gay person. In 1999, Georgina Beyer became the world's first openly transgender MP elected to a national parliament.

After nine years in government, the National Party lost the November 1999 election. Labour under Helen Clark out-polled National and formed a coalition government with Jim Anderton's Alliance, a party to the left of Labour. The coalition partners pioneered "agree to disagree" procedures to manage policy differences. The minority government often relied on support from the Green Party to pass legislation. Labour retained power in the July 2002 election, forming a coalition with Anderton's new Progressive Party, and reaching an agreement for support with the United Future party. Helen Clark remained prime minister. In early 2004, Labour came under attack for its policies on the ownership of the foreshore and seabed, eventually culminating in the establishment of a new break-away party, the Māori Party. Following the September 2005 election, negotiations between parties culminated in Clark announcing a third consecutive term of Labour-led government. The Labour Party again formed a coalition with the Progressive Party, with confidence and supply from Winston Peters' New Zealand First and Peter Dunne's United Future.

After the general election in November 2008, the National Party moved quickly to form a minority government with ACT, the Māori Party and United Future. This arrangement allowed National to decrease its reliance on the right-wing ACT party, whose free-market policies are sometimes controversial with the greater New Zealand public. In 2008, John Key was appointed prime minister, with Bill English as his deputy. This arrangement conformed to a tradition of having a north-south split in the major parties' leadership, as Key's residence is in Auckland and English's electorate is in the South Island. On 12 December 2016, English was elected as leader, and thus prime minister, by the National Party caucus after Key's unexpected resignation a week earlier. Paula Bennett (member for Upper Harbour) was appointed deputy prime minister, thus continuing the tradition. This north-south arrangement ceased with the next government.

Following the September 2017 general election National retained its plurality in the House of Representatives, while Labour greatly increased its proportion of the vote and number of seats. Following negotiations between the major and minor parties, Labour formed a minority government after securing a coalition arrangement with New Zealand First. The new government also agreed on a confidence-and-supply arrangement with the Green Party. On 26 October 2017, Labour leader Jacinda Ardern was sworn in as prime minister and Winston Peters became her deputy. In the 2020 general election Labour won by a landslide and gained an overall majority of seats in Parliament, sufficient to govern alone—a first under the MMP system. Labour's coalition partner New Zealand First lost its representation in Parliament. Ardern's government was sworn in for a second term on 6 November 2020. Chris Hipkins became prime minister after Ardern's resignation.

The 2023 general election saw the worst defeat of a sitting government since the introduction of the MMP system, with Labour losing nearly half of its seats. Subsequently, National, ACT and New Zealand First formed the country's first three-party coalition government. National leader Christopher Luxon became prime minister. In another first, Winston Peters and David Seymour will take turns as deputy prime minister.

== See also ==
- The Crown (New Zealand)
- List of political parties in New Zealand
- List of New Zealand left-wing activists
- List of New Zealand politicians
- List of political scandals in New Zealand
- List of public sector organisations in New Zealand
- Censorship in New Zealand
- Christian politics in New Zealand
- Contents of the United States diplomatic cables leak (New Zealand)
- Far-right politics in New Zealand
- Hate speech laws in New Zealand
