= Grant Morgan (activist) =

New Zealand politician

Grant Morgan is a political activist from Auckland, New Zealand.

Morgan was a leading member of the now defunct Socialist Worker, and the chairperson of the (also defunct) Residents Action Movement. He was also the first Secretary of the Solidarity Union, and the last General Secretary of the Communist Party of New Zealand.
