= Socialist Workers Organization (New Zealand) =

Trotskyist organization

The Socialist Workers Organization was a Trotskyist organisation based in New Zealand. It was part of the International Socialist Tendency, the British Socialist Workers Party's international tendency.

The Socialist Workers Organization was established by the merger of the Communist Party of New Zealand and the International Socialist Organisation in 1994. The former was the direct linear organisational continuation of the old Communist Party that had been founded as a part of the Communist International. Unlike most such official Communist parties that of New Zealand had aligned itself with Beijing after China and the Soviet Union fell out in 1961. Later still the CPNZ aligned itself with Albania.

The latter group, the ISO, had been formed by a small group who had been recruited to the politics of the International Socialism Tradition while living in Australia and had decided to form their own organisation based on those politics. It came as a shock to them then when they found that the leadership of the SWP (Britain) had entered into discussions with the CPNZ and they only reluctantly fused into the new Socialist Workers Organisation at the behest of the SWP who sent an emissary to New Zealand to further the fusion.

After a period of working together the core of the former ISO felt that the SWO was dominated by elements who had not broken from Stalinist organisational practices and politics and split to refound the International Socialist Organisation. The new ISO is active in Dunedin, Wellington, and Auckland. The SWO evolved into Socialist Worker (Aotearoa) active in Auckland and Wellington, but was dissolved in 2012.
