= Edward Hunter (Billy Banjo) =

Edward Hunter (also known as Billy Banjo; 2 June 1885 – 6 December 1959) was a Scottish socialist, active in both Scotland and New Zealand. He was a trade union organiser, politician and a writer, and played a considerable role in the development of socialism in New Zealand.

== Biography ==
=== Early life ===
Born in Lanarkshire he was the son of a miner, which he later became himself at the age of 12 after receiving little formal education. He emigrated to the West Coast of New Zealand in 1906, already a committed socialist, influenced by Scottish left-wing thinkers such as Keir Hardie and Bob Smillie (both members of the Independent Labour Party). As a miners' leader, Hunter became a leading member of the New Zealand Federation of Labour.

=== Socialist career ===
Hunter became a socialist writer using the pen-name Billy Banjo, articulating miners' concerns in verse and prose. Hunter was convinced that the miners could become politically educated to the extent where they would be ready to lead the working class to some form of socialist emancipation. He would regularly articulate these ideas and more in his writings.

In 1909 he married Mary Wards Cutt in Wellington, with whom he had four children.

As a member of the New Zealand Socialist Party, he had by 1911 become secretary of his local party branch. Around this time there was a wave of trade union militancy in New Zealand, and during this period Hunter became more politically assertive. In 'A song of freedom' Hunter called on the miners to 'stand and fight', and after the death of Fred Evans in a skirmish between police and striking miners at Waihi in November 1912, he called for a general strike which was proclaimed in 1913. Hunter welcomed this strike as a 'peoples' revolt' and was heavily involved in its organisation. His activities resulted in his arrest and he was charged with sedition. The authorities alleged that he incited revolution in response to the government's violent reaction. Hunter received a period of probation.

After the New Zealand Social Democratic Party was formed in 1913 in an attempt to unify various groups within the labour movement, Hunter represented the miners on the party's executive committee.

For his trade union organising activities and socialist beliefs, Hunter was blacklisted on the coalfields, so he instead worked as an organiser for the shearers' union and the Wellington Rural Workers' Union, and in various other jobs. His attempts to promote the cause of industrial unionism among rural workers were not as successful as they had been among the miners as his ideas fell on less receptive ears. It was in this period that Hunter turned more to his writing and away from active political organisation. He wrote many socialist poems and other works, much of which was published. In his writing there are similarities with the work of his brother-in-law James Welsh.

=== Later life ===
His wife Mary died in March 1915, leaving him to raise four young children alone. Hunter returned to Scotland with his family around 1919, when there was intense labour activity around the city of Glasgow which was commonly referred to as Red Clydeside. He immediately involved himself in the socialist agitation in Clydeside. Hunter wrote a play The Disinherited which was performed by people drawn from the mining community of Douglas Water in Lanarkshire. Thereafter Hunter worked as a journalist, writing for labour newspapers.

In 1937 he was elected on a Labour Party ticket to the Glasgow City Council. He represented Cowcaddens for 22 years and became deputy chairman of the council as well as serving as the city's police commissioner. He died shortly after his retirement from active politics.
