= Douglas Water (hamlet) =

Coordinates: 55°36′28″N 3°47′24″W

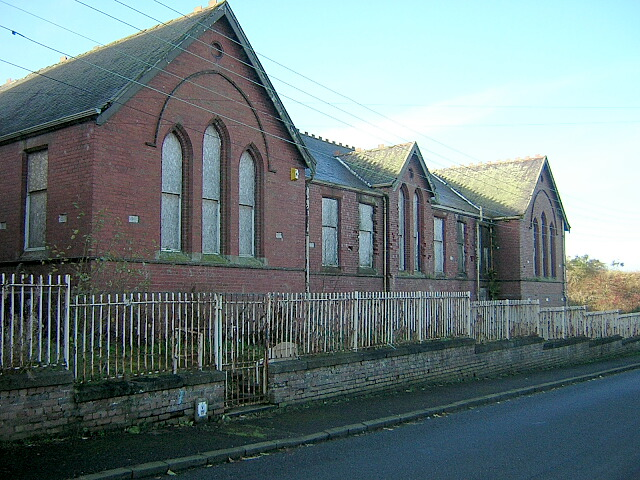
Douglas Water Primary School, Now Disused

Douglas Water is a hamlet in Lanarkshire, Scotland. Named after the Douglas Water, the river which flows through the hamlet, local mining operations provided employment to local people, and the hamlet was bolstered by the Coltness Iron and Coal Company establishing an operation nearby. Three haulage companies that operated from the hamlet also provided a source of employment.

There was for many years a junior football team that played in the hamlet, known as Douglas Water Thistle, but they became defunct some time ago. Several of their players have gone on to enjoy careers as professional footballers.

There was also a train station servicing Douglas Water, but it stopped being a working station around the time of the Beeching cuts. The station platform still exists.

When the last coal mine in the hamlet closed in 1967 the hamlet lost much of its population, as people left for other areas in search of employment. This was the beginning of the decline for Douglas Water as after then the local amenities, football club, train station and much of the other services in the hamlet closed. The hamlet today is a shadow of its former self, with many streets lying totally empty where the houses that once stood there having long since been demolished. The hamlet that was once a hustling mining town now has a population of less than 50 people, a shadow of its former self. It is impossible to now vision Douglas Waters importance in coal mining however a key reference point is that Rigside (a village less than 1 mile away) was first built to accommodate the overflow of workers from the pits and open casts of Douglas Water.

Douglas Water was the site for the performance of a play called "The Disinherited" by local people in the 1930s that had been written by the socialist writer and activist, Edward Hunter.

== See also ==
- Category:People from Douglas Water
