= Solidarity Union =

- Solidarity Union
- Founded: August 2006
- Headquarters: New Zealand
- Location: New Zealand

Solidarity Union was a short lived trade union in New Zealand and was founded by activists and delegates, including Joe Carolan of Socialist Aotearoa in August 2006. By 2008 the union had ceased meaningful activity. Grant Morgan was a Trustee in 2010, and Leonard Charles Parker and Peter Michael Hughes in 2012.

== Purpose and actions ==
The union sought to organise workers in clusters in South Auckland around an area strategy building local workers councils. It sees this as an antidote to the bureaucracies created by larger unions in New Zealand.

Solidarity was opposed to partnership as a policy, preferring to see a "return to the fighting spirit" of the country's first union movement, the Red Feds. It built a modest base in the South Auckland industrial regions of East Tamaki and Onehunga, organising small engineering firms, glass workers, courier drivers and service workers.

In 2007 it was involved in trying to obtain redundancy agreements for glass workers at MetroGlass. Membership of the union had reached 227. In September the union called for workers and students in Aotearoa to rally in support of Burmese anti-junta protests.

Under New Zealand legislation (Section 16 of the Employment Relations Act 2000) a registered union must file an annual membership return. In its 2008 return it had 3 members and its 2009 return said the Union was in recess. The Executive of the Union urged its members to join the National Distribution Union. By 2012 the Solidarity Union of New Zealand Incorporated was deregistered.

== See also ==
- List of trade unions
