= World Socialist Party (New Zealand) =

- Leader: None (membership conference)
- First Secretary: Rolfe R. Everson
- Founded: 1930; 96 years ago
- Preceded by: Petone Marxian Club, New Zealand Marxian Association
- Headquarters: PO Box 1929, Auckland 1140, New Zealand
- Newspaper: Socialist Review (1934); Socialist Comment (1944–1948); Socialist Viewpoint (1971–1982)
- Ideology: Classical Marxism; Socialism; Impossibilism
- International affiliation: World Socialist Movement
- Colors: Red

Website
- worldsocialism.org/nz

The World Socialist Party of New Zealand (WSPNZ) is a revolutionary socialist and anti-Leninist political party in New Zealand founded in 1930 as the Socialist Party of New Zealand (SPNZ). The WSPNZ is affiliated with the Socialist Party of Great Britain (SPGB) and the World Socialist Movement (WSM).

The party was formed by members of the Petone Marxian Club and New Zealand Marxian Association, with significant involvement from former members of the Australian Socialist Party. In January 1934, the party created a journal, named the Socialist Review, however due to increasing economic difficulties, it stopped publication in July of that year. In the 1940s, the party co-operated on Socialist Comment. In 1971, the party contested its first parliamentary election and in 1975 put up seven candidates.

The WSPNZ last ran a candidate in the 1996 election, gaining a total of 27 votes.

== Radio ==
The WSPNZ ran Radio Imagine 88.3 FM out of Manurewa, Auckland, starting as early as 2001.
