= Socialist Aotearoa =

Revolutionary socialist organisation based in New Zealand

- Co-founder: Joe Carolan
- Founded: 2008
- Ideology: Revolutionary socialism Socialism; Marxism; Tino rangatiratanga Trotskyism
- Political position: Far-left
- International affiliation: International Socialist Tendency
- Slogan: "All Power to the People"
- MPs in the House of Representatives: 0 / 120

Website
- socialistaotearoa.org

Socialist Aotearoa (also known as SA and Socialist – People Before Profit) is a revolutionary socialist organisation based in New Zealand. SA formed as a split from Socialist Worker in 2008. They are based in Auckland and are part of the International Socialist Tendency. Joe Carolan, a Unite Union employee and former Mana party candidate, is a co-founder and the current Campaigns Officer.

SA has been involved since its inception in organising and participating in campaigns against privatisation, corporate globalisation, racism and war. These campaigns have ranged from Aotearoa Not For Sale to Love Aotearoa Hate Racism, to the movement against the Trans-Pacific Partnership Agreement (TPPA).

== Principles and policies ==
Socialist Aotearoa ratified the statement of its principles titled 'Five Fingers for a Fist' at their foundation hui on 10 May 2008. It is currently published on their website. The document is an allusion to their five key principles: 1. One Solution, Revolution, 2. Workers of the World, Unite, 3. Equality For All, 4. United Fronts, and 5. For a Rank and File Network Within the Trade Union Movement.

Their first principle emphasizes that 'Socialist Aotearoa is a revolutionary, socialist, anti capitalist group', claiming to fight for systemic change. Socialist Aotearoa advocate for a 'working class movement', explained in detail in their fifth principle.

The party also claims to be an international group that strongly opposes "imperialist" wars and occupations, as detailed in their second principle. They have demanded withdrawal of New Zealand troops from the Pacific and (when New Zealand had troops there) from Afghanistan. Furthermore, the party holds strong pro-immigration, pro-refugee and anti-racism stances. Their third principle states that they 'oppose all oppressions based on race, gender, sexuality and religion'.

== Mt. Albert by-election ==
In 2016, Joe Carolan announced his intention to stand in the 2017 Mount Albert by-election. Carolan gave his party as Socialist – People Before Profit on the ballot paper. Carolan received 189 votes, or 1.4%, in the context of low voter turnout, as the incumbent National Party did not stand in the election.

SA's platform in the by-election included:

- Making the minimum wage a living wage of $20
- Rent controls, the building of 100,000 state houses, and a tax on empty homes
- Making transport and education free
- A "liveable" universal basic income
- Abolishing the Goods and Services Tax (GST)
- A "Robin Hood Tax" of 1% on all financial transactions
- Rejecting the Trans-Pacific Partnership Agreement (TPPA)
- Stopping the deportation of the eleven Indian students who had been victims of a fraudulent tertiary education provider. SA members had been helping lead the campaign to keep these students in the country.

== See also ==
- International Socialist Tendency
- Mana Movement
- Revolutionary socialism
- Unite Union
- Socialist Worker (Aotearoa)
