= Peace Action Wellington =

Peace Action Wellington (PAW) is a left-wing activist organisation based in Wellington, New Zealand primarily known for their opposition to western intervention and military involvement around the world, advocacy for indigenous rights, and capitalism. With support from members of the Green Party of Aotearoa New Zealand, the group is also linked to other local activist groups. Peace Action Wellington is affiliated with the American Peace Action group.

For its sometimes provocative actions, the group has attracted the attention of New Zealand's security and intelligence services. In particular, the perceived violent actions and support for domestic terrorism has attracted significant attention.

== History ==
=== Early History and Foundation ===
Peace Action Wellington was founded in 2001 from an amalgamation of Marxist, anarchist, anti-western, social-justice and union groups in response to the United States invasion of Afghanistan as part of the war on terror, following the September 11 attacks. The group stated that they wished to promote peaceful, rather than violent responses to world conflict. The group further 2003 invasion of Iraq, and played a role in the New Zealand anti-war movement's opposition to the war, organising several nationwide protests. Particular importance was given to the involvement of the New Zealand Special Air Service, and its actions fighting under ISAF command in Afghanistan. In March 2003 PAW issued an official statement denouncing the wars, stating that American, British and Australian interests should be targeted in retaliation. In 2004, the group organised a rally from Civic Square to the Wellington Cenotaph intended to demonstrate their opposition to the war on terror.

=== Protests against Weapons Conferences ===
The group has also organised protests against a variety of military history and defence industry events. Following pressure from PAW, Wellington Mayor Justin Lester instituted guidelines prohibiting military industry related events from taking place on all Wellington City Council venues. The group has engaged in actions such as blockading venues through peaceful protest and spamming phone, fax and email messages towards local government entities, Trade and Enterprise NZ in addition to private companies. Peace Action Wellington member Valerie Morse stated that:

“People from throughout New Zealand have let weapons companies, and those providing them with a platform to do their dirty work, directly know what they think of a weapons conference being held at Te Papa"

Seven protesters faced charges of intimidation after they dressed up as clowns and protested outside the Wellington home of Neal Garnett, organiser of a weapons conference, in October 2006. Included were members Valerie Morse, Kelly Buchanan, David Cooper, Sebastian Henschel, Jesse Hinchey, Hannah Newport-Watson, Urs Singer and Emily Bailey.

In 2015 Peace Action Wellington held a campaign against an arms industry fair held at the Wellington TSB Arena, a Wellington City Council owned venue. A petition was presented to the city council and when the chair of the council committee dismissed it plans began for a blockade of the TSB arena. Spokesperson Valerie Morse criticised the police for their response in the arrest of 27 members of Peace Action. All charges were dropped over a year later.

In June 2007, Peace Action Wellington spokesperson Valerie Morse published the political manifesto "Against Freedom", through the far-left publisher Rebel Press.

=== Anti Domestic Terrorism Raids ===
Following the 2007 New Zealand police raids of paramilitary and terrorist training camps in the Urewera Mountains, several members of Peace Action Wellington were implicated, including spokesperson Valorie Morse, and members Urs Peter Signer, Tame Iti, Te Rangikaiwhiria Kemara, Urs Signer and Emily Bailey. These individuals became known as the Urewera 17. Members of this group were charged with the illegal possession of firearms (including military-style semi automatic rifles), Molotov cocktails, improvised explosive devices and ammunition.

=== ANZAC Day protests ===
In 2007, Peace Action Wellington member Valerie Morse was fined $500 and charged with behaving in an offensive manner after a demonstration at the dawn ceremony for ANZAC Day to protest against the New Zealand military's involvement in Afghanistan, the Solomon Islands and Timor Leste. Two banners were held and two New Zealand flags were burnt, resulting in two arrests. The charges were later dropped by the Supreme Court.

In 2014 and 2015, Peace Action Wellington again focussed on ANZAC Day. Particular attention was shown to the centennial commemoration of the Great War during this time. The group suggested that the centennial was being used to promote the military.

=== Roxy Cinema Threat ===
In May 2018, Peace Action Wellington, along with associated group Auckland Peace Action called for the Documentary Edge Festival to drop screenings of the Israeli film Ben Gurion, Epilogue as part of its endorsement of the Palestinian–led Boycott, Divestment and Sanctions movement. On 14 May, Peace Action Wellington protested outside Wellington's Roxy Cinema and were assaulted by cinema-goers. The protesters also reportedly brought fake bombs in the form of a beeping black box in an attempt to scare cinema goers into leaving; although the screening went ahead regardless and there was no evacuation. In response, Doc Edge Film Festival director Alex Lee rejected claims that the Ben Gurion film was propaganda and stated that the Auckland film screening would go ahead despite warnings of further protests by local Palestinian solidarity groups. The film's director Yariv Mozer urged the protesters to watch the film instead of boycotting it.

== See also ==
- List of anti-war organizations
