= Socialist Worker (Aotearoa) =

Socialist Worker members marching against the Israeli invasion of Lebanon on 5 August 2006 in Queen Street, Auckland.

Socialist Worker (SW) was a socialist organisation based in New Zealand (Aotearoa).

Socialist Worker began to grow modestly through work done in workers' organisations such as the Solidarity Union, Unite Union, the Climate Change Coalition Climaction, the anti-war movement and the Venezuela Aotearoa Solidarity Team.

Socialist Worker had a regularly updated blog called UnityAotearoa.

SW's national conference in February 2007 adopted a new ten point "Where We Stand" programme.

SW was part of the International Socialist Tendency (IST). On 1 May 2007, it presented a May Day Statement to the IST, calling for a positive engagement with the Venezuelan Revolution.

A number of SW members split from the organisation in 2008 to form Socialist Aotearoa.

SW voted to dissolve itself at its conference in January 2012.

== See also ==
- International Socialist Tendency
