= Unite Union =

New Zealand trade union

Unite Unite Manatōpū
- Unite Union Manatōpū.
- Headquarters: Auckland, New Zealand
- Location: New Zealand
- Members: ~6000
- National Secretary: Shanna Olsen-Reeder
- Key people: Gerard Hehir; Tali Williams; Heeni Smith
- Affiliations: NZCTU
- Website: unite.org.nz

Unite Union is a trade union in New Zealand. It represents a number of workers across various industries, and was the sponsor of the Supersizemypay campaign directed towards improving working conditions for fast food workers in the country, in addition to representing other hospitality and retail workers. Unite is affiliated with the New Zealand Council of Trade Unions.

== History ==
In mid-2003, a small group of trade unionists and activists attempted to "organise the unorganised". It began to focus on unionising workers predominantly from fast food, cinema, and security.

In response to the Key Government's amendment to the Employment Relations Act 2000 allowing small businesses greater liberty to "hire and fire" workers in the first 90 days, Unite established the "Rat Patrol" to name and shame companies that abuse the legislation.

Matt McCarten's United Support Services, a company he formed to supply support services to the union, was placed into liquidation on 17 June 2011 owing $92,000 in unpaid taxes to the IRD.

In 2015, Unite engaged in the End Zero Hours campaign, primarily aimed at securing minimum guarantees of hours in union collective employment agreements. The campaign was ultimately successful with the National Government passing legislation outlawing "zero hour contracts".

As of 2026, Unite Union Manatōpū has 6,000 Fast Food, Casino, Hotel, Call Centre and Cinema members.

List of National Secretaries
| Name | Start Date | End Date | Notes |
|---|---|---|---|
| Matt McCarten | 2003 | 2014 | |
| Gerard Hehir | 2014 | 2020 | |
| John Crocker | 2020 | 2024 | |
| Shanna Olsen-Reeder | 2024 | Present Day | |

It was the inspiration for the former Australian UNITE Union, which was founded in Melbourne in 2003.

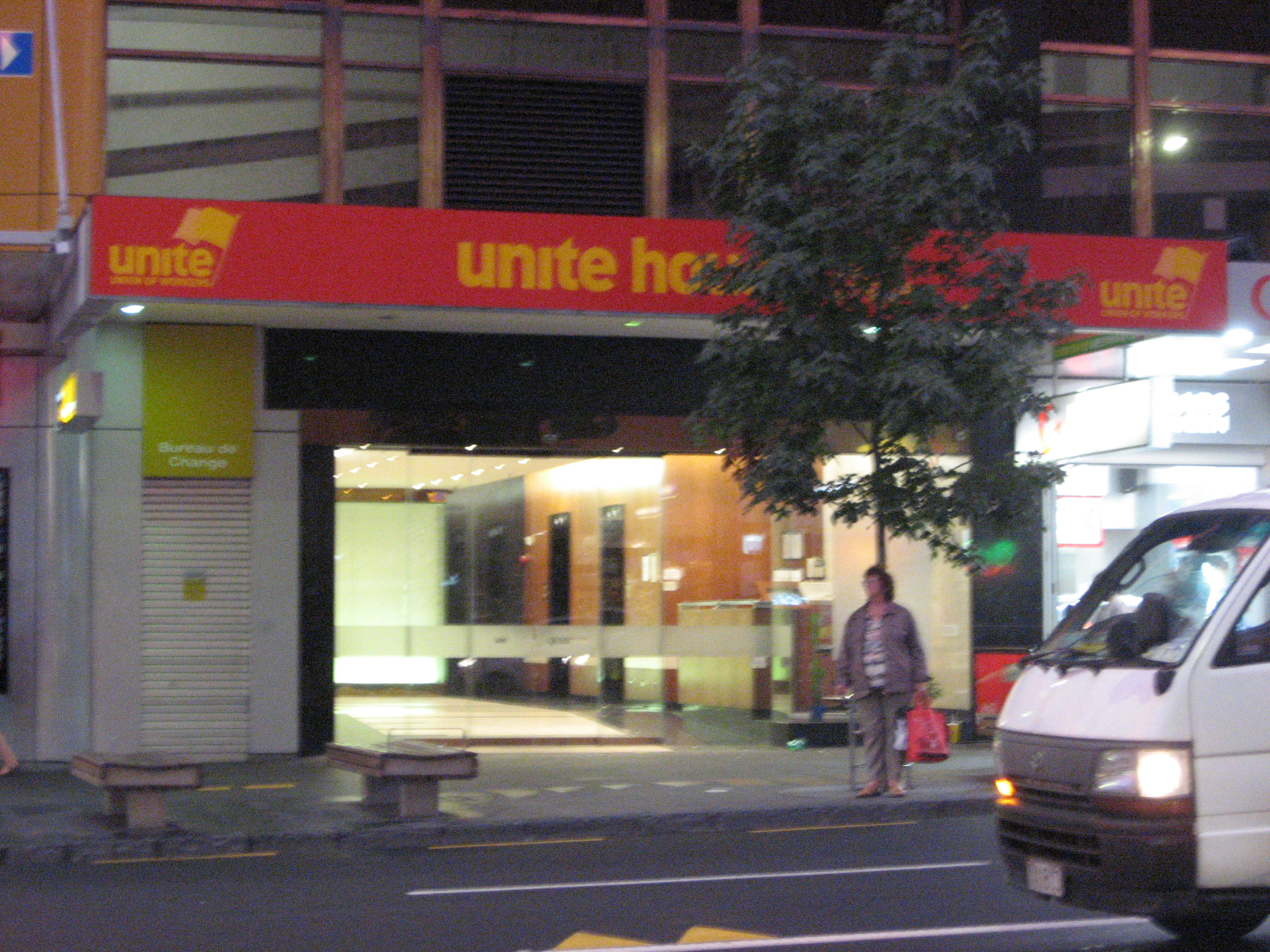
Former Unite Union headquarters in Auckland.
