= Vic Wilcox =

New Zealand trade unionist

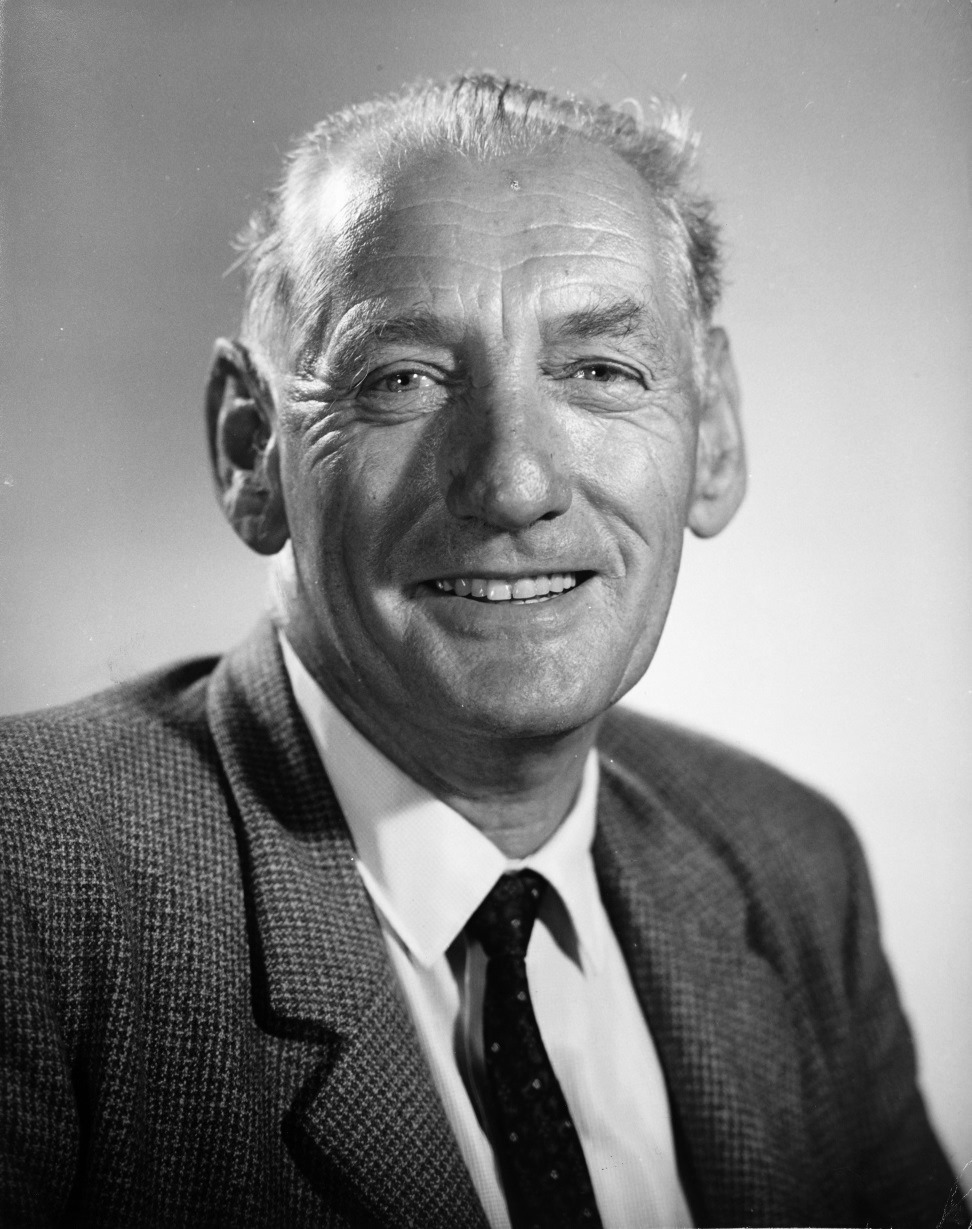
Wilcox in 1955

Victor George Wilcox (6 November 1912 – 29 April 1989) was a New Zealand farmer and trade unionist who was secretary-general of the Communist Party of New Zealand.

== Biography ==
=== Early life ===
Wilcox was born in Willesden, London, England on 6 November 1912 to William Wilcox, a railway shunter, and his wife Kathleen Sage. In the mid-1920s, the Wilcoxes emigrated to New Zealand with his family. His father took up dairy farming at Waiharara in Northland while Vic was educated at Takapuna Grammar School. After completing his education Wilcox worked on farms in Northland. There he became involved with the Waiharara branch of the New Zealand Farmers' Union and he served as its secretary from 1936 until 1939. He partook in many sports in his youth including rugby and tennis, later in life he took a keen interest in horse racing.

Wilcox married Ann Richards on 21 June 1940 and would later have one daughter. Then during World War II, Wilcox served as a clerk in the Royal New Zealand Air Force starting May 1942. In October 1943 he was transferred to the reserve list on grounds of ill health.

=== Political career ===
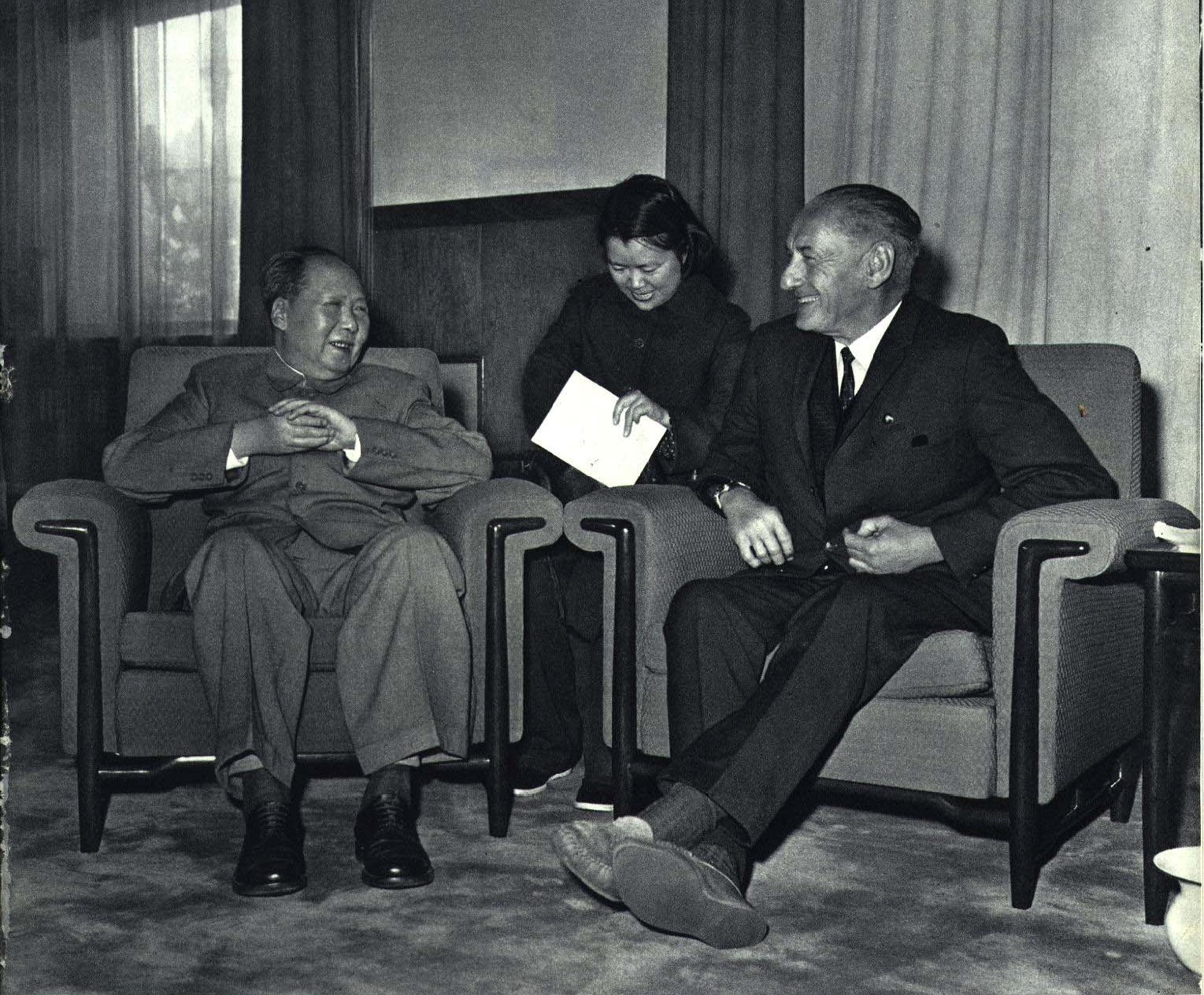
Vic Wilcox meeting with Mao Zedong in 1967

After spending much time unemployed during the Great Depression, Wilcox read wide ranges of Marxist literature and became convinced that the economic models used in the Soviet Union were a better model than those used in New Zealand at the time. In 1933 he formed a branch of the Friends of the Soviet Union in Waiharara and in 1934 he joined the Communist Party of New Zealand (CPNZ). By 1941 he was a member of the national committee of the CPNZ and later joined the national executive in 1946 as treasurer. In 1951 Wilcox succeeded Sid Scott as general secretary, the highest position in the CPNZ.

He stood unsuccessfully for the CPNZ for the Arch Hill electorate in 1946, 1949 and 1951, Auckland Central in 1954 and Waitakere in both 1960 and 1963. Wilcox's poll of 534 (4.1%) in Arch Hill in 1946 was highest ever vote for a communist candidate in New Zealand. Wilcox also stood in local elections in Auckland, receiving better results. He secured over 3,000 votes in his campaign for Auckland's mayoralty in 1947.

In 1960 a rift opened between pro-Soviet and pro-China members in the CPNZ during the Sino-Soviet split. As leader Wilcox aligned the CPNZ with China. In 1966 one-third of the party membership left to form the pro-Soviet Socialist Unity Party (SUP). Wilcox regularly visited China and was frequently a welcome guest of leaders including Mao Zedong, Zhou Enlai and Deng Xiaoping.

=== Later life and death ===
Wilcox continued his political activity in old age via the New Zealand China Friendship Society before dying of cancer at his home in Henderson, Auckland, on 29 April 1989. He was survived by his wife and daughter. His funeral ceremony took place in a green garden in the Waitakere foothills where his brother-in-law Mark Richards (a poet) read a poem by communist Rewi Alley in tribute to Wilcox and the attendees sang "The Internationale".
