= Arch Hill =

Arch Hill may refer to:

- Arch Hill, New Zealand, a suburb of Auckland
- Arch Hill Recordings, a recording studio located in the Auckland suburb
- Arch Hill (New Zealand electorate), a parliamentary electorate named after the Auckland suburb
