= List of youth wings of political parties in Indonesia =

This article lists the youth wings of political parties in Indonesia. This list also includes student wings.

== Currently affiliated with political party ==
Name	Native name	Established	Party	Source
	Generasi Muda Demokrat	5 April 2004	Democratic Party	
	Insan Muda Demokrat Indonesia	20 May 2004	Democratic Party	
	Kader Muda Demokrat	23 August 2004	Democratic Party	
Democratic Youth National Committee	Komite Nasional Pemuda Demokrat	12 July 2004	Democratic Party	
	Angkatan Muda Demokrat Indonesia	28 October 2004	Democratic Party	
	Barisan Massa Demokrat	1 November 2007	Democratic Party	
	Angkatan Muda Majelis Dakwah Islamiyah	24 May 1978	Golkar	
	Angkatan Muda Partai Golkar	11 February 2002	Golkar	
	Angkatan Muda Pembaharuan Indonesia	28 June 1978	Golkar	
	Forum Komunikasi Studi Mahasiswa Kekaryaan	23 August 1982	Golkar	
	Wira Karya Indonesia	10 November 1963	Golkar	
	Barisan Muda Kosgoro '57	23 March 2003	Golkar	
	Angkatan Muda Satuan Karya Ulama Indonesia	25 December 1988	Golkar	
MKGR Young Generation	Generasi Muda MKGR	3 January 1960	Golkar	
	Ikatan Pemuda Tarbiyah Islamiyah	4 July 1970	Golkar (since 1973)	
	Mahasiswa Pembangunan Indonesia	1996	Golkar	
	Gabungan Pemuda Pembangunan Indonesia	1998	Golkar	
Kaaba Youth Forces	Angkatan Muda Ka'bah	30 November 1998	United Development Party	
Young Generation of Indonesian Development	Generasi Muda Pembangunan Indonesia	18 October 1993	United Development Party	
United Young Generation	Generasi Muda Persatuan	29 March 1982	United Development Party	
Indonesian Muslim Student Movement	Gerakan Mahasiswa Islam Indonesia	14 November 2007	United Development Party	
Kaaba Youth Movement	Gerakan Pemuda Ka'bah	29 March 1982	United Development Party	
	Gerakan Muda Nurani Rakyat	21 January 2007	Hanura	
	Pemuda Hanura	30 August 2007	Hanura	
	Satuan Relawan Indonesia Raya	30 May 2008	Gerindra	
Great Indonesia Bud	Tunas Indonesia Raya	7 July 2008	Gerindra	
	Barisan Muda Damai Sejahtera	20 May 2004	Prosperous Peace Party	
	Barisan Muda Pembaruan	10 June 2005	Democratic Renewal Party	
	Barisan Muda Penegak Amanat Nasional	23 August 1998	National Mandate Party	
	Generasi Muda Kasih Bangsa PDKB	15 February 2002	Love The Nation Democratic Party	
	Gerakan Muda Persaudaraan Pemuda Keadilan	1 September 2005	Prosperous Justice Party	
	Gerakan Pemuda Daerah	1 June 2006	Regional Unity Party	
	Gerakan Pemuda Kebangkitan Bangsa	11 March 1999	National Awakening Party	
	Pemuda Bulan Bintang	8 January 1999	Crescent Star Party	
	Brigade Hizbullah Bulan Bintang	22 September 1999	Crescent Star Party	

== Formerly affiliated with political party ==
Name	Native name	Established	Party	Unaffiliated	Source
Indonesian Christian Student Movement	Gerakan Mahasiswa Kristen Indonesia	9 February 1950	Indonesian Christian Party	1973	
Indonesian Christian Youth Forces' Movement	Gerakan Angkatan Muda Kristen Indonesia	4 November 1945	Indonesian Christian Party	1973	
Indonesian Christian Pupil Movement	Gerakan Siswa Kristen Indonesia	1964	Indonesian Christian Party	1966 (dissolved)	
