= Maire Leadbeater =

New Zealand activist

Maire Leadbeater (née Locke, born 19 October 1945), is a New Zealand human rights and peace activist, writer, and former social worker. Leadbeater played a leading role in the New Zealand branch of the Campaign for Nuclear Disarmament and has also advocated on human rights issues relating to East Timor, the Philippines, and Indonesia. She also served as a councillor on the Auckland City Council and Auckland Regional Council.

== Family ==
Leadbeater is the daughter of Jack and Elsie Locke, and has three siblings: Keith Locke, Alison Locke, and Don Locke. At the age of ten, Leadbeater began distributing a Communist newspaper called People's Voice while living in Christchurch. Her activities attracted the attention of the New Zealand Security Intelligence Service, the country's main domestic intelligence service, who compiled a file on her and her family members including her mother Elsie.

== Professional career ==
Leadbeater worked as a social worker in Auckland.

She was also a councillor in the Auckland City Council and the Auckland Regional Council, who campaigned under the centre-left ticket body City Vision.

== Activism ==
During the 1970s, Leadbeater became active in the New Zealand arm of the Campaign for Nuclear Disarmament, which had been founded by her mother Elsie Locke. During the 1980s and 1990s, Leadbeater served as the media spokesperson for the Campaign for Nuclear Disarmament, which successfully campaigned for a New Zealand nuclear-free zone and a ban on visits by nuclear-armed and nuclear-powered ships. She was also involved in various other human rights, peace, anti-Apartheid and solidarity groups including the Auckland East Timor Independence Committee, the Philippines Solidarity Network of Aotearoa, the Indonesia Human Rights Committee and the Palestine Human Rights Committee. Her family's left-wing activities made her the target of surveillance by the NZSIS, who kept a file on her until 2002.

In 2001, she attended an anti-globalisation conference in Jakarta called the Asia Pacific People's Solidarity Conference, which had been organised by Indonesian non-governmental organisation INCREASE (the Indonesian Centre for Reform and Social Emancipation). The conference was disrupted by members of the fundamentalist Ka'bah Party who were armed with machetes and knives. Indonesian police stood by and subsequently arrested the conference participants. Leadbeater was part of a group of 32 foreigners who were detained and threatened with deportation by Indonesian authorities.

Leadbeater has written about New Zealand's role in facilitating the Indonesian invasion of East Timor and the anti-nuclear movement in New Zealand during the 1980s. Leadbeter has criticised the NZSIS and Government Communications Security Bureau for spying on New Zealanders and allegedly serving the interests of the Five Eyes powers over New Zealand. Leadbeater has argued that the intelligence services' claim to combat "subversion and security threats" were a smokescreen for "targeting people and movements who disagree with the political status quo."

== Writings ==
- Leadbeater, Maire (2005). "Expediency, Hypocrisy, Policy". In John, Henderson; Watson, Greg (eds.). Securing a Peaceful Pacific. Christchurch, New Zealand: Canterbury University Press. pp. 492–99. ISBN 1-877257-37-0.
- Leadbeater, Maire (2006). Negligent Neighbour: New Zealand's Complicity in the Invasion and Occupation of Timor-Leste. Nelson, New Zealand: Craig Potton Publishing. ISBN 1-877333-59-X.
- Leadbeater, Maire (October 2009). "New Zealand and the Philippines: Military Ties or Peace Ties?". PSNA Kapatiran.
- Leadbeater, Maire (2011). "New Zealand as a potential West Papuan peace broker: Learning from Bougainville". In King, Peter; Elmslie, Jim; Webb Gannon, Camelia (eds.). Comprehending West Papua (PDF). Sydney, New South Wales: Center for Peace and Conflict Studies, The University of Sydney. pp. 159–176. ISBN 978-0-9808286-7-2.
- Leadbeater, Maire (2013). Peace, Power & Politics: How New Zealand became nuclear free (PDF). Dunedin, New Zealand: University of Otago Press. ISBN 978-1-877578-58-8.
- Leadbeater, Maire (2018). See No Evil: New Zealand's betrayal of the people of West Papua (PDF). Dunedin, New Zealand: Otago University Press. ISBN 9781988531212.
- Leadbeater, Maire (2024). The Enemy Within: The human cost of state surveillance in Aotearoa/New Zealand. Nelson, New Zealand: Potton & Burton. ISBN 9781988550657.
