= Workers' Communist League of New Zealand =

Political party active from 1980 to 1990

Poster of the Workers' Communist League of New Zealand, protesting against the 1980 Moscow Olympics. The poster carries the header "Berlin 1936 Moscow 1980" (alluding to the 1936 Berlin Olympics) and shows the Moscow Olympics mascot Misha as a Matryoshka doll.

The Workers' Communist League of New Zealand (abbreviated WCL) was a political party in New Zealand. During the 1980s the WCL was the second-largest Marxist organisation in the country (after the pro-Moscow Socialist Unity Party of New Zealand (SUP)). Whilst relatively small, the organisation played a key role in various social movements. The organisation was noted for its role in the protest movements against tours of the South African rugby union team Springboks. The group was active in the trade union movement, in particular in Wellington. During the 1980s WCL diverged from Leninist orthodoxy and embraced feminism and Maori self-determination.

== 1970 split ==
The WCL traced its roots to a 1970 split in the Communist Party of New Zealand (CPNZ). A faction had emerged in Wellington, that saw the CPNZ as being under the control of a "bureaucratic, devious and drunken party leadership clique". In 1970 CPNZ expelled its Wellington District organisation. The expelled faction, referred to by the CPNZ as the 'Manson-Bailey gang' after its leaders, Xinhua News Agency correspondent Rona Bailey and watersider Jack Manson, began building a rival organisation to the CPNZ.

The Manson-Bailey group continued to refer to itself as the Wellington District Committee of the CPNZ for some time. It gained supporters in other parts of the country, such as Auckland. But the group hesitated to announce themselves as a new political party, hoping to gain a majority of CPNZ membership on their side and to obtain support from the Chinese Communist Party (CCP). The group organised activities at campuses of Victoria University, against apartheid and the Vietnam War and in favour of Maori land rights. Ron Smith was among the cadres of the Wellington group that would become the WCL. The group was active in the New Zealand China Friendship Society, organizing student delegations to visit China. The independent leftist monthly The Paper, published 1973–1975, was seen as close to the group.

== Working Women's Alliance ==
The group led the formation of the Working Women's Alliance (WWA) in 1974, seeking to unite female workers and housewives into a platform of socialist feminism. The WWA set up branches in Wellington, Dunedin, Hamilton, Palmerston North and New Plymouth. By 1978 WWA had become largely defunct.

== Wellington Marxist–Leninist Organisation ==
In 1976 the group took the name Wellington Marxist–Leninist Organisation. The group would be nick-named 'MILO'. MILO began publishing Unity in 1978.

== Formation of WCL ==
In 1980 MILO merged with the Waikato-based Northern Communist Organisation and different campus-based groupings, forming the WCL. Whilst the CPNZ turned towards the Party of Labour of Albania in the Sino-Albanian split, the WCL remained aligned with the CCP. WCL upheld Marxism–Leninism-Mao Zedong Thought, seeking to "unite democratic forces under working-class leadership to 'oppose fascism, imperialism and reaction in New Zealand' with 'mass struggle to defend living standards, democratic rights and oppose superpower contention'." The party was established on the foundation of democratic centralism.

WCL functioned as an underground party. The membership was largely academics and students. The group also had some presence among unemployed and industrial workers, in particular around Wellington.

== 1981 anti-tour protest movement ==
Opposition to rugby union exchanges with apartheid South Africa had organised in New Zealand since the 1960s, with the emergence of the Halt All Racist Tours movement. The WCL played a prominent role in the 1981 South Africa rugby union tour protests in Wellington, with a more "disciplined" approach compared to the chaotic protests in Auckland. Nevertheless, Prime Minister Robert Muldoon publicly attacked "members of subversive organisations" within the anti-tour movement, including many "known" and "probable" members of the WCL, with his controversial publication of a report prepared by the New Zealand Security Intelligence Service (SIS). According to activist Don Carson, who later successfully sued for libel, Muldoon was "trying to drive a wedge between what the SIS described as the radicals and subversives, and the mainstream decent protesters."

== Tripod theory ==
In the aftermath of the anti-tour protests, tensions arose between WCL cadres (who had key roles in the Halt All Racist Tours movement) and Maori radicals who wished to steer the energy of the anti-tour movement to local anti-racist and land rights causes (a proposition the WCL leadership rejected). The increasingly public debates between WCL and Maori activists brought Maori radical discourse to a wider audience, with Donna Awatere Huata articulating the views of the Maori movement in articles and literature. The post-1981 tour protest debates influenced Sue Bradford and other WCL members who became increasingly oriented towards women's and Maori struggles.

During 1982–1983 WCL revised its political model, and by 1984 the organisation came to reject the Leninist ideal of a proletarian vanguard party in favour of seeking to build a coalition of diverse forces struggling against capitalism, patriarchy and colonialism. WCL came to adopt the 'tripod theory' of oppression, which argued that race, gender and class as interlocking pillars of societal oppression. Under the new line WCL placed struggles for women's liberation and Maori self-determination at par in importance with the class struggle.

== Rights Centre and labour movement ==
In 1983 the Auckland Unemployed Workers' Rights Centre was founded, at an assembly of unemployed workers, Auckland University students, WCL members, community workers, Auckland Trades Council representatives and Project Employment Programme workers. The majority of the Rights Centre founders came from WCL, such as Sue Bradford, Bill Bradford, Zoe Truell and Brian Avison.

The Rights Centre rivalled the Auckland Trades Council-sponsored Auckland Unemployed Workers Union, which was led by the SUP. There was notable tensions between the SUP and WCL within the unemployed workers' movement. When the Te Roopu Rawakore o Aotearoa movement for unemployed workers was launched in 1985, the WCL and the Rights Centre played a key role in it. In 1987 WCL supported Therese O'Connell as a candidate for vice president of the New Zealand Council of Trade Unions, running against Angela Foulkes.

== Later period ==
As of the mid-1980s, WCL was estimated to have had around 120 members and a larger network of sympathizers. During the 1985 protests against the planned All Blacks tour in South Africa, WCL reportedly controlled the demonstration's marshals' committee of the Citizens Opposed to the Springbok Tour, thus effectively controlling the protest movement in Wellington. In the preparations for protests against the proposed 1985 tour, WCL sought to combat sexism throughout the protest movement.

WCL remained active in anti-apartheid movements and organised solidarity campaigns for Central America. WCL maintained links with the National Democratic Front of the Philippines.

In its latter period WCL was led by Graeme Clarke. By the late 1980s WCL held formal conversations with the Trotskyist Socialist Action League about a possible merger, albeit no such unification materialized.

== Dissolution and launch of Left Currents ==
By 1989 the group was estimated to have had some 50 members. The last issue of Unity was published on 16 March 1990. The issue outlined that the publication had been discontinued due to financial difficulties, that the 7th WCL congress held in January 1990 had disbanded the party and that a new organisation called Left Currents had been formed in its place.

The 16 March 1990 Unity issue stated that Left Currents intended to "build a revolutionary alliance for the forces struggling for Maori, women's and workers liberation" and that the organisation had removed the word 'communist' from its discourse due to its "negative associations with monolithic, patriarchal, excessively hierarchical, racist and/or national chauvinistic, and environmentally exploitative actions of communist parties in power". Left Currents lasted for about a year before becoming defunct.

The history of the WCL is outlined in Ron Smith's 1994 autobiography Working Class Son: My Fight Against Capitalism and War.
