= Gordon Watson (communist) =

New Zealand communist and soldier

Clement Gordon Watson
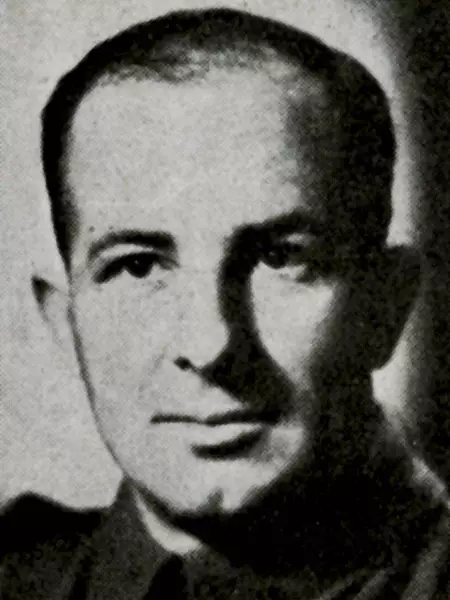
- Born: 5 April 1912; Mangaweka
- Died: 17 April 1945 (aged 33); Faenza, Italy
- Cause of death: Killed in action
- Education: Wellington College, Victoria University College
- Political party: CPNZ
- Parents: Reginald Beresford Spencer Watson (father); Roberta Agnes Hughes (mother)

Clement Gordon Watson (5 April 1912 – 17 April 1945) was a notable New Zealand communist, journalist and soldier. He fought in World War Two, serving in the Italian campaign as a private in the 2nd New Zealand Division.

== Biography ==
Clement Gordon Watson was born in Mangaweka, Wanganui, New Zealand in 1912. His mother died when he was young and his father moved to Fiji to run a plantation, so he was brought up by his aunt in Wellington. He was an excellent student, winning a Junior Scholarship at Wellington College in 1929 and graduating from Victoria University College with a MA (second-class honours) in languages and literature in 1934.

Watson was radicalised at university during the Great Depression. He was a leader of the college's Free Discussions Club, whose newspaper Student was banned in 1933 after only two issues, attracting a lot of publicity. That same year, Watson would join the Communist Party of New Zealand, although he had been close to the party since 1932 when he joined the Friends of the Soviet Union. By mid-1934, Watson was a member of the Central Committee. In 1936, he was appointed editor of the party's official newspaper Worker's Weekly, which would be relaunched as People’s Voice in 1939. He would spend most of 1937 in the Soviet Union, engaging in political discussion and attempting to gain funding for CPNZ.

Althoughly staunchly against fascism, the CPNZ opposed the war. This would cause the Labour government to ban the party newspaper People's Voice in 1940. Along with Sid Scott, Watson would continue to publish the newspaper in a lava cave in South Auckland, near Wiri. After the German invasion of the Soviet Union, Watson and CPNZ would switch to supporting the war.

Watson would enlist in November 1941 as a private. He would serve in the Pacific and then in the Italian campaign. He was killed in action near Faenza, Italy on the 17 April 1945, aged 33.

He never married, but was engaged to a close companion from the 1930s, Mollie Render, at the time of his death. He was also a friend of writer Elsie Locke, who would help publish a memorial collection of his works in 1949.

== Legacy ==
In 1951, Watson's aunt Isabel Evelyn Spencer Watson established a scholarship fund in memory of her nephew. It provides $12,000 NZD per year for New Zealand students to study international relationships or social and economic conditions at a university overseas at Masters or PhD level.

The Wellington branch of the now-defunct Socialist Unity Party of New Zealand was named in his honour.
