= Keith Locke =

New Zealand politician (1944–2024)

Keith Locke MNZM
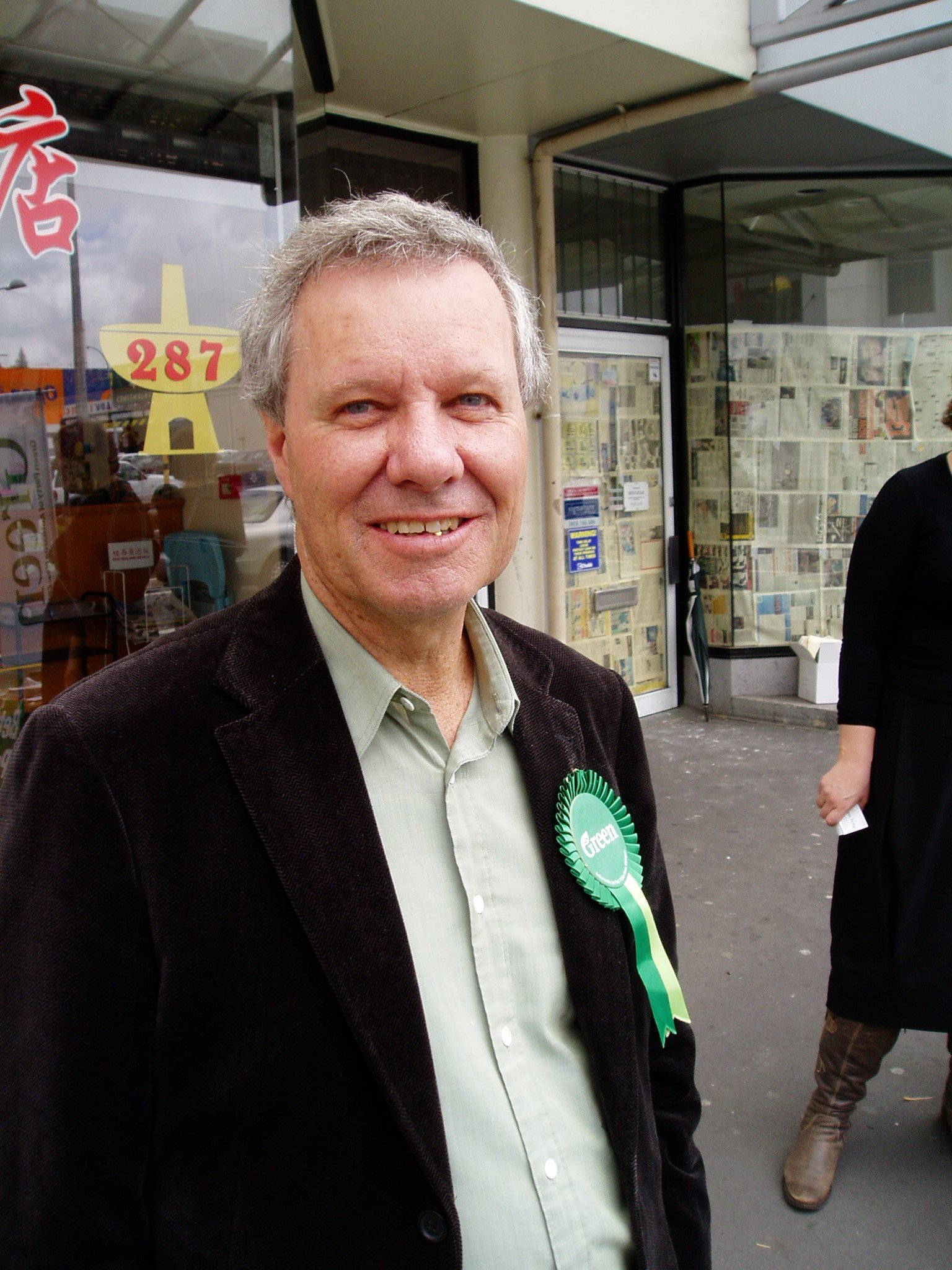
- Locke campaigning during the 2008 New Zealand general election

Member of the New Zealand Parliament for Green Party List
- In office 20 December 1999 – 20 October 2011

Personal details
- Born: 15 April 1944 Christchurch, New Zealand
- Died: 21 June 2024 (aged 80) Auckland, New Zealand
- Party: Green Party
- Relatives: Maire Leadbeater (sister); Elsie Locke (mother)
- Occupation: Politician
- Website: www.keithlocke.org.nz

Keith James Locke MNZM (15 April 1944 – 21 June 2024) was a New Zealand activist and politician. He was a Green Party Member of Parliament from 1999 to 2011.

== Early life and family ==
Locke was born on 15 April 1944 in Christchurch and grew up in that city. His parents were Jack and Elsie Locke, prominent lifelong political activists for a wide variety of causes. Their four children were brought up in this environment and followed their parents into a life of activism. His sister Maire Leadbeater is a well-known activist and former city councillor for Auckland City Council). His father Jack was under surveillance during the 1951 New Zealand waterfront dispute.

Former Prime Minister Robert Muldoon is said to have described the Lockes as the most "notorious Communist family in New Zealand". The Lockes lived in the Avon Loop area of the Christchurch Central City and were very active in the community, notably organising native tree plantings and clean-ups of the Avon River / Ōtākaro. They also argued against development of the area in favour of retaining the character of the area.

Locke attended Christchurch Boys' High School and received a BSc in psychology from the University of Canterbury, where he was active in the New Left Club. He went to Canada for a master's degree in sociology at the University of Alberta.

== Career and early political activism ==
Returning to New Zealand from Canada, Locke lectured in sociology at Victoria University of Wellington from 1970 to 1972. He left academia to work as a full-time editor of the fortnightly socialist paper Socialist Action from 1972 to 1977. From 1979 to 1986, he worked as an active socialist and unionist in a car factory, railway workshops and meatworks in the Wellington region. In 1985, he moved to Auckland, working in the Auckland City abattoirs, 1985–86. From 1986 to 1990, Locke worked full-time as the national coordinator of the Philippines Solidarity Network, based in Auckland. From 1990 to 1999, he was manager of One World Books, a non-profit bookshop in Auckland specialising in social, environmental and development issues.

Politically active all his life, Locke joined the Socialist Action League (SAL) in 1970. By 1972, he was both the National Secretary of the SAL and chairman of "Socialists for Labour". By 1985, Locke had left the SAL but was still involved in various issue movements. These included Latin America, the Philippines and East Timor solidarity movements and the anti-nuclear movement. Locke was a pacifist and was critical of violent left-wing activism in Quebec and Uruguay as "counterproductive".

In 1989, Jim Anderton broke away from the Labour Party to form the NewLabour Party (NLP). Locke, as well as several other former SAL members, were given roles in the NLP's first National Council. Locke was appointed to be NLP foreign affairs and defence spokesperson and stood as the NLP candidate for Eden in the 1990 election, where he finished fourth.

In December 1991, the NLP joined with the Green Party, Mana Motuhake and the Democrats to form the Alliance Party. Locke continued as foreign affairs spokesperson for the Alliance and stood in Eden in the 1993 election, finishing third, and Owairaka in the 1996 election, finishing fourth. He was ranked 24 on the Alliance party list in the 1996 election. Locke was not elected and, after the election, was forced to relinquish his role as foreign affairs spokesman to list MP Matt Robson.

By 1997, Locke was critical of the Alliance, saying that Anderton's offer to the Labour Party of working together in a future coalition government would help only Labour and not the Alliance, and that it would be better for the Alliance to "carve out its critical space on the left." The same year, the Green Party decided to leave the Alliance. Locke opted to join the Green Party and became its foreign affairs spokesperson.

== Member of Parliament ==
New Zealand Parliament
Years	Term	Electorate	List	Party
1999–2002	46th	List	7	Green
2002–2005	47th	List	7	Green
2005–2008	48th	List	5	Green
2008–2011	49th	List	6	Green

Locke stood as a Green Party candidate in the 1999 election and was elected as a list MP, ranked seventh on the party list. Locke's election as the final Green list MP, at the expense of Labour, deprived the Labour–Alliance government of a majority but the Green Party agreed to provide confidence and supply to the government. Locke was returned to Parliament as a list MP in the 2002, 2005 and 2008 elections. In the latter three elections, he stood unsuccessfully in the Epsom electorate.

Through his twelve-year parliamentary career, Locke was the Green Party spokesperson for foreign affairs, defence, immigration and disarmament, and a member of the foreign affairs, defence and trade committee. He was also a Green Party spokesperson for state services, police, security, human rights, and Auckland transport.

In 2000, Locke had two member's bills drawn from the ballot. The first, the Intelligence and Security Committee Act Repeal Bill, attempted to reform oversight of the New Zealand Security Intelligence Service and Government Communications Security Bureau. It was defeated at its first reading. The second, the International Treaties Bill, attempted to give greater parliamentary oversight of treaty-making. It was sent to select committee, but ultimately defeated at its second reading in 2003.

As a Member of Parliament, Locke established a profile of being an "unofficial civil liberties watchdog". He was involved in campaigns against the New Zealand Police being armed with Taser guns, and repeal of the law of sedition. He advocated for refugee rights, most prominently in the drawn-out case of Ahmed Zaoui, an Algerian asylum seeker initially deemed by the New Zealand government to be a security risk, but later allowed to settle in New Zealand with his family. During his time in Parliament Locke was a leading critic of New Zealand's anti-terrorist legislation, such as the Terrorism Suppression Act 2002, which he argued breached human rights principles. He also opposed New Zealand's commitment of special forces to the war in Afghanistan.

Long a critic of New Zealand's intelligence services, in 2008, Locke received, under the Privacy Act, a copy of the file the Security Intelligence Service had kept on him from 1955, when he had been 11 years old, to 2006. This surveillance of a sitting Member of Parliament was investigated by the Inspector-General of Intelligence and Security, Paul Neazor, who then recommended that any such files be closed when a person enters Parliament. It was later revealed by Locke from 2008 until 2018 he was referred to as a “threat” in induction documents for the SIS and GCSB because he “wish[ed] to see the NZSIS & GCSB abolished or greatly modified” labelling it a “syndrome”.

Locke supported a New Zealand republic. In his maiden speech, Locke stated "We should also break free of the British Crown and become a republic. The question is not whether the monarchy has a lot of power over us. In practice it doesn't. The problem is that bowing before the British Queen reflects a colonial mentality." In 2002, Locke put forward the Head of State (Referenda) Bill, which if passed would have brought about a referendum on the question of whether New Zealand should become a republic. The Bill was selected for debate on 14 October 2009 but was defeated at its first reading in April 2010.

In January 2011, Locke announced that he would retire at that year's election. He delivered his valedictory speech on 28 September 2011. With Sue Kedgley, Locke's retirement completed the departure of the first intake of Green Party MPs from 1999.

== Honours and awards ==
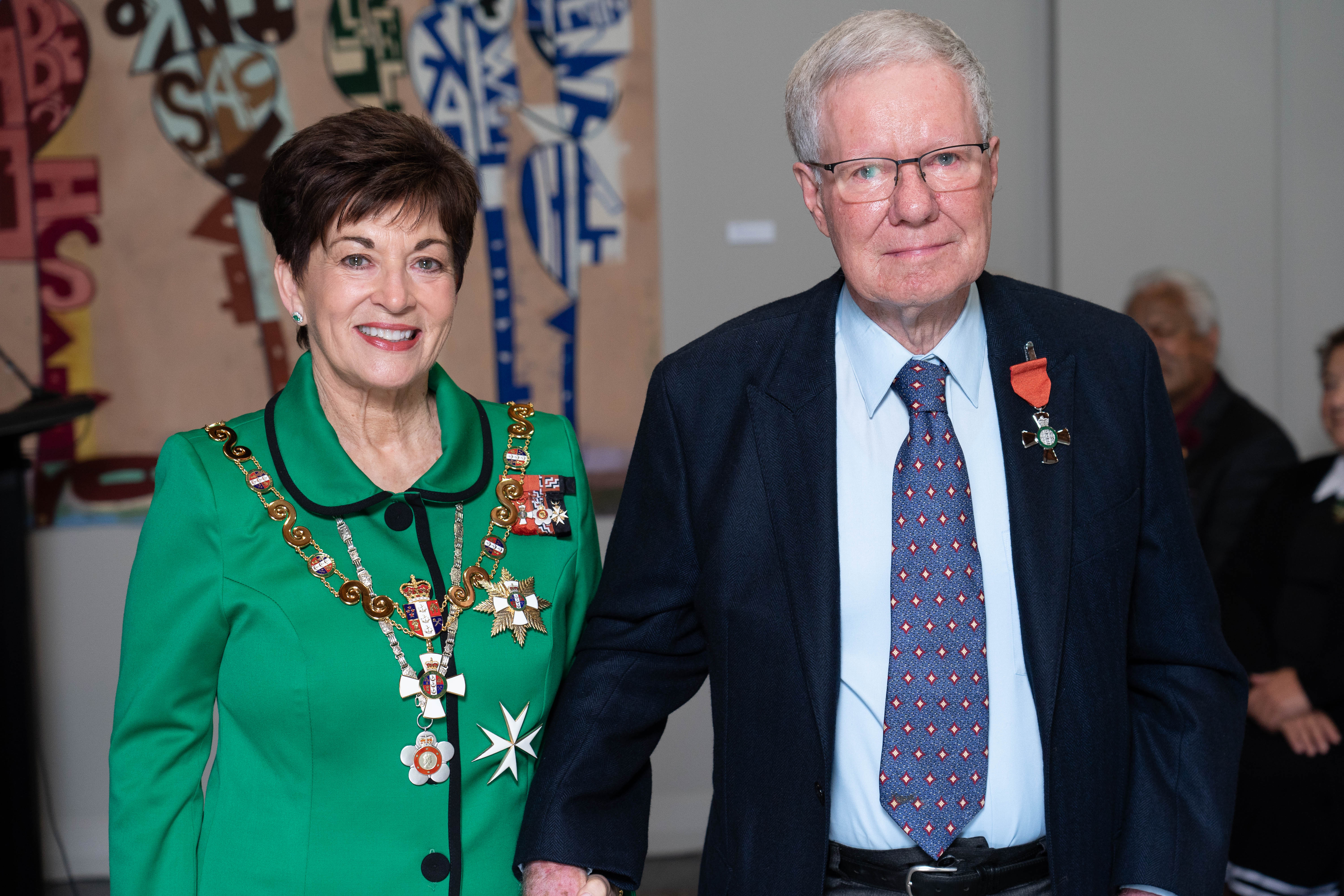
Locke (right), after his investiture as a Member of the New Zealand Order of Merit by the governor-general, Dame Patsy Reddy, at Government House, Auckland, on 20 April 2021

During his 12 years in Parliament, Locke won a number of awards. He was twice named 'Backbencher of the Year', first in 2002 by Vernon Small, then deputy political editor of The New Zealand Herald, and again in 2010 by The Dominion Post political staff. He also received the New Zealand Republic's Colonel Allen Bell Award in 2011; the New Zealand Amnesty International's Human Rights Defender Award in 2012; and the Federation of Islamic Associations for New Zealand's Harmony Award in 2013.

In the 2021 New Year Honours, Locke was appointed a Member of the New Zealand Order of Merit, for services to human rights advocacy.

== Controversies ==
His political opponents referred to him during question time as "Pol Pot" or "the Honourable Member for Cambodia" due to supportive articles he wrote while editor of the New Zealand Socialist Action newspaper about the Khmer Rouge regime under the headline; Cambodia liberated: victory for humanity. Locke claimed his initial support for the Khmer Rouge was because "many people thought the Khmer Rouge were an adjunct of the Vietnamese communist forces" and that he thought they "would be better than the regimes they replaced". He also responded that he renounced his support after hearing of their atrocities, while the New Zealand Government of the time continued to express support for the regime.

Similarly, while he opposed the 2001 war in Afghanistan to remove the Taliban, he had written an article (in Socialist Action) entitled "Why workers should support Soviet action in Afghanistan" in 1980. This led to accusations of hypocrisy. Locke explained that his previous support for the Soviet invasion was the position of the Socialist Action League, that he was wrong to have supported it, that he was incorrect in believing it would protect human rights in Afghanistan, and that he now believed it encouraged Islamic extremist groups.

During the 2005 election he contested the Epsom electorate in Auckland and at a public meeting he promised to run through the streets of Epsom naked if the electorate was won by ACT New Zealand's leader Rodney Hide. Hide won the seat. "I'll do it. I have to," Locke was reported as saying. "I was so confident, but I have turned out to be wrong and I have got to do it." Locke's promise made headlines in media around the world. On Sunday 25 September 2005 Locke walked near-naked down Broadway (a main shopping street in Newmarket, Auckland) wearing shoes, socks, a G-string, and body paint. The paint camouflaged Locke's skin by depicting a suit and tie from the neck down.

== Post-parliamentary activities ==
After retiring from Parliament, Locke joined the boards of the Auckland Refugee Council and the New Zealand Peace and Conflict Studies Centre Trust. He wrote on political issues for New Zealand newspapers and the Daily Blog.

== Death ==
Locke died in Auckland on 21 June 2024, at the age of 80.
