= Arch Hill (electorate) =

Arch Hill was one of 80 electorates in New Zealand between 1946 and 1954. Located in central Auckland, the electorate was considered a safe seat for the Labour Party in its eight years of existence.

Arch Hill was one of many urban electorates created as part of the 1946 electoral redistribution. The 1946 redistribution abolished the country quota, which had previously accorded 28% greater representation for rural electorates.

== Overview ==
The 1941 New Zealand census had been cancelled due to World War II, so the 1946 electoral redistribution had to take ten years of population growth and movement into account. The North Island gained a further two electorates from the South Island due to faster population growth. The abolition of the country quota through the Electoral Amendment Act, 1945 reduced the number and increased the size of rural electorates and had the opposite effect for electorates in urban areas like Auckland. None of the 80 existing electorates remained unchanged; 27 electorates were abolished, eight former electorates were re-established, and 19 electorates were created for the first time, including Arch Hill. The Arch Hill electorate was formed out of portions of the Auckland Central, Auckland West, and Grey Lynn electorates. It was centred on the suburb of Arch Hill, and included parts of Grey Lynn, Eden Terrace, Newton, and southern Ponsonby.

The Arch Hill electorate was abolished through the 1952 electoral redistribution, when it was absorbed into the neighbouring electorates of Auckland Central, Ponsonby, and Eden. These changes came into effect through the 1954 election.

== History ==
The first representative was Bill Parry, who had become prominent through his involvement in the 1912 Waihi miners' strike and his resulting imprisonment, and who had previously represented Auckland Central since the 1919 election. Parry retired at the end of the parliamentary term in 1951, and died a year later on 27 November 1952.

Parry was succeeded through the 1951 election by John Stewart. When the Arch Hill electorate was abolished in 1954, Stewart contested the Eden electorate, but was beaten by National's Duncan Rae.

=== Members of Parliament ===
Key

Labour

Election	Winner
1946 election	Bill Parry
1949 election	Bill Parry
1951 election	John Stewart
(Electorate abolished in 1954; see Eden, Auckland Central)

== Election results ==
=== 1951 election ===
1951 general election: Arch Hill
Party	Candidate	Votes	%	±%
Labour	John Stewart	7,311	67.50	
National	Paddy Hope	3,346	30.89	
Communist	Vic Wilcox	173	1.59	−1.27
Majority		3,965	36.61	
Turnout		10,830	85.78	−8.04
Registered electors		12,625		

=== 1949 election ===
1949 general election: Arch Hill
Party	Candidate	Votes	%	±%
Labour	Bill Parry	8,399	70.18	−2.97
National	Gordon Frederick Smith	3,225	26.94	
Communist	Vic Wilcox	343	2.86	−1.22
Majority		5,174	43.23	−7.17
Turnout		11,967	93.82	−0.19
Registered electors		12,754		

=== 1946 election ===
1946 general election: Arch Hill
Party	Candidate	Votes	%	±%
Labour	Bill Parry	9,558	73.15	
National	Edward James Clark	2,973	22.75	
Communist	Vic Wilcox	534	4.08	
Majority		6,585	50.40	
Turnout		13,065	94.01	
Registered electors		13,897		
