= Elsie Locke =

New Zealand writer, historian, and activist

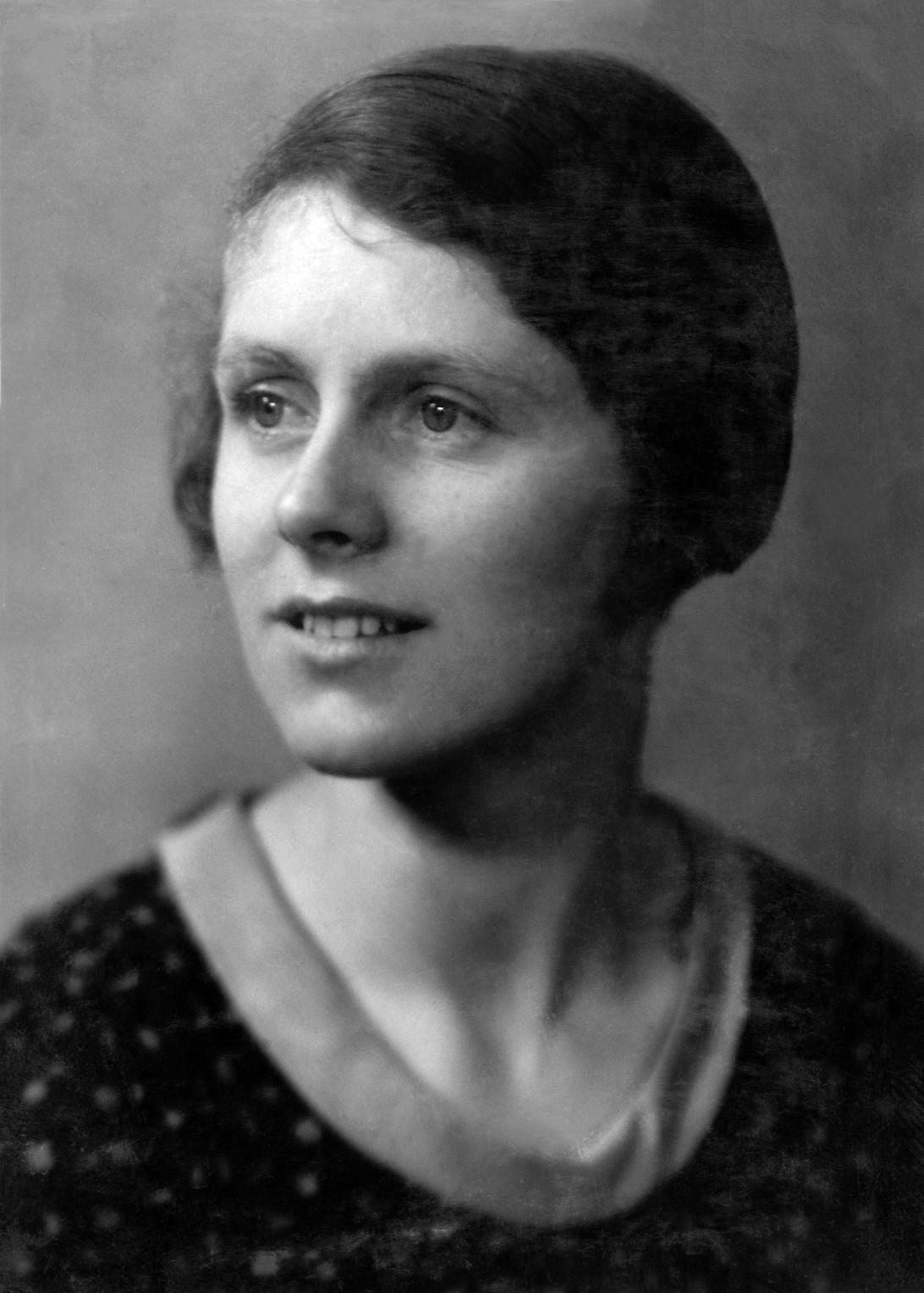
- Portrait of Elsie Locke, taken in 1936
- Born: Elsie Violet Farrelly; 17 August 1912; Hamilton, New Zealand
- Died: 8 April 2001 (aged 88); Christchurch, New Zealand
- Other name: Elsie Freeman
- Education: B.A. (1933), University of Auckland; D.Litt. [honorary] (1987), University of Canterbury
- Occupations: Writer, historian
- Known for: Children's literature, activism
- Relatives: Maire Leadbeater (daughter); Keith Locke (son)

Elsie Violet Locke (née Farrelly; 17 August 1912 – 8 April 2001) was a New Zealand communist writer, historian, and leading activist in the feminism and peace movements. Probably best known for her children's literature, The Oxford Companion to New Zealand Literature said that she "made a remarkable contribution to New Zealand society", for which the University of Canterbury awarded her an honorary D.Litt. in 1987. She was married to Jack Locke, a leading member of the Communist Party.

== Biography ==
=== Early life ===
Locke was the youngest of six children, born Elsie Violet Farrelly in Hamilton, New Zealand on 17 August 1912. She was the daughter of William John Allerton Farrelly (1878–1945) and Ellen Electa Farrelly (née Bryan; 1874–1936). Both of Locke's parents were born in New Zealand, and while only educated to primary level (see Education in New Zealand § Years of schooling), they were both progressive thinkers. William's intelligence was recognised early at school, and he strongly encouraged education for his children, himself being unable to continue his education past Standard Six. Meanwhile, Ellen had been a teenager during the New Zealand women's suffrage movement, and passed on the idea of gender equality to her daughters, as well as teaching them the value of being independent.

Elsie grew up in Waiuku, a small town south of Auckland, where she developed a repugnance towards war at an early age. As a young girl, she witnessed the injuries of World War I veterans first hand — "...when visiting Warkworth I was taken to see a man whose face had been half shot away and who never went off his farm". Though she left Waiuku at a young age, she retained strong ties to the town into her old age, and often returned. Unusually for a Pākehā of her generation, she developed a close relationship with the local iwi in Waiuku, Ngāti Te Ata, and her later research proved vital to their Treaty of Waitangi claim.

=== Education ===
While few working class children, particularly girls, went to high school when Locke was young, she continued on to Waiuku District High School, a student there from 1925 to 1929. Locke was the only member of her family to complete high school, and the only student in her class for her final two years of schooling. Locke wanted to be a writer, rather than a teacher or nurse, the conventional careers for literate women of her generation. She won a scholarship to study at the University of Auckland, where she became known as "Little Farrelly". She started in 1930, at the beginning of the Depression, and Locke struggled for income – she lived off a mixture of scholarships and part-time jobs, such as working at the Parnell Public Library. She became involved in printing the early literary magazine, Phoenix, and though she did not write for the magazine, her flat was a central base for all those involved. In 1932 during her time at the university, Locke had an experience that would become a major influence on her future political ideology and activism, according to her daughter, Maire Leadbeater. This "watershed experience" was the sight of 10,000 unemployed men marching down Queen Street, which according to Leadbeater instilled in Locke an ambition "to be one with all who struggled and all who were oppressed".

When the last of the ten thousand had passed me, I was left on the pavement to answer the question these men had silently flung at me: whose side are you on? Whoever you are, and wherever you are going, I am going too, I had answered.

— Elsie Locke, Student at the Gates (1981), p. 98

Locke gained an increasing interest in socialism during her studies, and attended meetings of Friends of the Soviet Union, and the Fabian Society. In 1932 she organised a Working Women's Convention, and the following year she graduated university with a BA, and joined the Communist Party.

Locke wrote of her early life and education in her 1981 autobiography, Student at the Gates, which discusses the influences which shaped her socialist philosophies, and some of New Zealand's dominant political and literary personalities of the 1920s and 1930s.

=== Family ===
In 1935 Locke married her first husband, Frederick Engels ("Fred") Freeman, a fellow Communist Party member, and became Elsie Freeman. In 1937 Elsie divorced Fred – considered a "shameful disgrace" at the time, and in 1938 her first son, Don, was born. She had sole custody of Don, at a time when being a solo mother was particularly difficult.

In November 1941 she married her second husband, John Gibson ("Jack") Locke (b. 1908), with whom she stayed until his death in 1996. Jack, a meat-worker who had immigrated to New Zealand from England at 19, was a leading member of the Communist Party, and the couple had met at the party's meetings. Jack was soon posted in Christchurch by the Communist Party, and in 1944 they moved into 392 Oxford Terrace, a "tiny gingerbread cottage" with an outside toilet, on the banks of the Avon River. Elsie loved the country, and hated cities – she later said that she did not want to move to Christchurch but did so for Jack. However, the couple lived in the cottage until their deaths.

Elsie had three more children with Jack – Keith, Maire, and Alison. She brought her four children up to appreciate everything artistic, and love the outdoors. The family often took tramping trips, and scrimped to send Maire to ballet lessons. Elsie continued to attend many cultural events with Maire into her old age. Both Jack and Elsie were lifelong atheists.

Keith Locke, Elsie's son, became a Green Party MP, in parliament from 1999 to 2011, and her daughter Maire, now called Maire Leadbeater, was councillor in the Auckland City Council and the Auckland Regional Council. Both have been long-time peace and anti-nuclear activists.

=== Communist Party and tuberculosis ===
Locke joined the Communist Party in 1933, and was a leading party activist, particularly in the 1930s. After graduating university in 1933, Locke moved to Wellington, where she became involved in leading the local branch of the Communist Party. In 1934 she became the national organiser of the Working Women's Committees, which arose out of the unemployed workers' movement. The original purpose of these committees was to publish the early monthly feminist journal, The Working Woman, which Locke began with the support of the Communist Party the same year. This last issue of this journal was in November 1936. In April 1937 the first issue of its successor, Woman Today, was published, designed to appeal to a broader audience. Woman Today was edited by Locke, and ran until October 1939, with contributions from notable writers such as Gloria Rawlinson and Robin Hyde. Locke later wrote that "a 'second wave' of feminism came at that time and was building up when it was cut short by the war, and much of it was expressed in and concentrated around Woman Today."

In 1936 concern for families unable to support unplanned children led Lock and Lois Suckling to convene the first meeting of the Sex, Hygiene and Birth Regulation Society, of which they were secretary and president respectively. This society was the forerunner of the Family Planning Association. Locke stood as the Communist Party candidate for the Wellington Hospital Board and Lower Hutt City Council in the 1941 local body elections, and later that year married leading party member Jack Locke. Jack was the chairman of the Christchurch branch of the party, and their candidate in several elections during the 1950s and 1960s. During their time in the Communist Party, Jack earned a living in a freezing works, and Elsie lived as a "traditional housewife and mother", while continuing her writing and work in feminism.

From 1946 to 1948 Elsie was hospitalised with spinal tuberculosis, and she had to remain flat on her back. It meant that her children were moved around the country for long periods during her illness. Tuberculosis was a major killer at the time, but Locke survived, spending the time reading and contemplating her political beliefs.

Locke became convinced that the New Zealand Communist Party should develop a more "home-grown ideology". At the same time, she was an internationalist, and it was this, according to the New Zealand Journal of History, "that drew her into the Communist Party and ultimately made her leave it, in 1956". Locke, like many others, left in protest both over the Soviet response to the Hungarian Revolution, and the "excesses" of Stalinism. However, her husband Jack remained a communist until his death. After leaving the party, Elsie did not like her role in the Communist Party highlighted because, while the couple had "agreed to disagree" on political issues, she would say that the publicity "upsets Jack".

These were times that called to faith, not questioning. I committed the supreme crime: I did question.

— Elsie Locke, Looking for Answers in Landfall 48 (December 1958), p. 344

Robert Muldoon once described the Lockes as the most "notorious Communist family in New Zealand", and the Lockes' membership in the Communist Party had long-term implications on how Elsie and her family were perceived by some security agencies. In the 1980s she travelled to Canada for a writers' conference, the only overseas trip she ever made. Despite her now being an elderly lady, US authorities required that she was accompanied by an armed guard for her entire stopover in Hawaii. In addition, the New Zealand Security Intelligence Service (SIS) kept a file on Elsie, as well as her children. In 2008 Locke's daughter, Maire Leadbeater, received her own file from the SIS. It dated back to when Leadbeater delivered the People's Voice, a communist newspaper, at 10 years old, and contained detailed information from private meetings held in homes and offices. The file showed that the SIS believed Elsie and Jack's marriage may have been strained by Elsie's departure from the Communist Party. Leadbeater said of the file, "It's all wrong anyway. It's unpleasant, inaccurate speculation about highly personal family issues." Keith Locke has also received his file from the SIS, described as "thick", and Elsie's file was received by her biographer. Shortly after Elsie died, a "vicious" letter was published in The Press, accusing her of being "a Communist, a Stalinist, a tool of the Kremlin, and complicit in the genocide of 100 million people" — though many letters were written to the newspaper in response both defending Locke, and denouncing The Press for publishing the original letter.

=== Peace activism ===
Locke focused a lot more of her attention into peace activism after she left the Communist Party in 1956, though she had been involved in anti-war issues her whole life, including the campaign against conscription in the late 1940s. She considered nuclear weapons a greater evil than the Holocaust, and was a co-founder of the New Zealand branch of the Campaign for Nuclear Disarmament in the 1950s, and an executive member from 1957 to 1970. Locke was extremely proud of New Zealand's nuclear-free status, and of the decades of struggle endured to achieve it. She remained committed to the cause for the rest of her life.

=== Writing ===
While Locke had always wanted to be a writer, it was in the 1950s that she began to take it seriously. In 1949 she edited Gordon Watson, New Zealander, 1912–45: His Life and Writings, and in 1950 she wrote a political history of the Canterbury region, The Shepherd and the Scullery Maid, 1850–1950: Canterbury Without Laurels, both published by the Communist Party. In 1954 she self-published a book of her poetry, The Time of the Child: A Sequence of Poems. Writing became very important to Locke, who managed to keep a room to herself in their tiny house for more than 50 years.

Virginia Woolf said if you wanted to write, or for that matter make anything of yourself, you needed a room of your own and five hundred pounds a year. I never had the five hundred pounds but I made sure I always had a room.

— Elsie Locke, A Bird in the Hand by Bruce Ansley; New Zealand Listener (20 April 1996)

Locke won the inaugural Katherine Mansfield Memorial Award (and its NZ£52.10s. prize), at the ceremony held on Mansfield's birthday in 1959, in the now defunct literary essay category, for her essay, Looking for Answers Locke's essay, one of 105 entries in the category, was an account of her reasons both for joining, and leaving, the Communist Party, and was published in Landfall 48 (December 1958).

Overall, Locke was probably best known as a children's writer. In the 1960s, when Locke began contributing to the New Zealand School Journal (published by the School Publication Branch of the Department of Education) her career as a writer became truly established. She was commissioned by the School Publication Branch to write a series of historical booklets from 1962 to 1968, designed to educate children about New Zealand's social history, and later compiled in The Kauri and the Willow: How we Lived and Grew from 1801–1942 (1984). While writing these series Locke realised her lack of knowledge about Māori language, culture, history, and spirituality. This led her to study the language, and incorporate biculturalism as a central feature of her writing long before it was fashionable to do so. According to The Oxford Companion to New Zealand Literature, she expressed the Māori point of view "with sympathy and insight in novels that in this respect were in advance of general perceptions and political correctness".

Her first novel, The Runaway Settlers (1965), was her most popular work, and has been in continuous print longer than any other New Zealand children's book. Originally issued with illustrations by Anthony Maitland, and reissued in 1993 with illustrations by Gary Hebley, The Runaway Settlers is a historical fiction novel based on the true story of Mrs Small and her children, who flee from the violent Mr Small in Sydney, assume the family name Phipps, and settle in Governors Bay, south of Christchurch. Though their life there is difficult, the family's hard work pays off, and they end up being successful. The descendants of the family still live in Governors Bay. The book received the inaugural Gaelyn Gordon Award for a Much-Loved Book in 1999 – one of Locke's most treasured awards, according to her daughter.

Locke's work for the School Publications Branch had revived her interest in her hometown, Waiuku, and her second children's book, The End of the Harbour: An Historical Novel for Children (1968), was based on the town's history. Locke spent a summer in Waiuku researching the novel, which was illustrated by Kāterina Mataira. It is set in 1860, when Waiuku was on the border between the Māori King Movement and the expanding settler society, and the First Taranaki War was just beginning. The book follows the story of David Learwood, an 11-year-old Pākehā boy whose parents have moved to Waiuku to work at a local hotel. While David's mother is fearful of meeting a Māori, and David has never met one, he becomes friends with Honatana, a local Māori boy, as well as several Pākehā adults sympathetic to Māori, and a Pākehā-Māori boy. The Oxford Companion to New Zealand Literature describes The End of the Harbour as "a compassionate exploration of land issues from Maori and Pakeha perspectives".

A Canoe in the Mist, the story of two girls experiences during the 1886 eruption of Mount Tarawera, was released by Jonathan Cape in 1984, with illustrations by John Shelley. Lillian lives with her widowed mother in the village of Te Wairoa, a popular destination for visitors seeking the famous volcanic sights of Lake Rotomahana. Lillian befriends Mattie, the daughter of English tourists, and together they see the famous Pink and White Terraces, but ominous signs have been seen – a tidal wave on the usually calm lake, and there are reports of a waka wairua ghostly canoe seen through the mist. The maori sage Thuhoto predicts disaster. That night the volcano suddenly erupts, and the girls are thrown into in a desperate struggle for survival as all around is destroyed. Re-published in 2005 in the Collins Modern Classics series, the National Library of New Zealand has described the book as a "kiwi classic."

=== Later life ===
Along with Rod Donald, Locke was active in the founding of the Avon Loop Planning Association (ALPA) and in the ongoing development of community in the historic Avon Loop residential area in central Christchurch. Locke received an honorary D.Litt from the University of Canterbury in 1987 for her work in the community. Locke campaigned for a more balanced understanding of New Zealand history.

Elsie Locke died in Christchurch on 8 April 2001.

== Commemoration ==
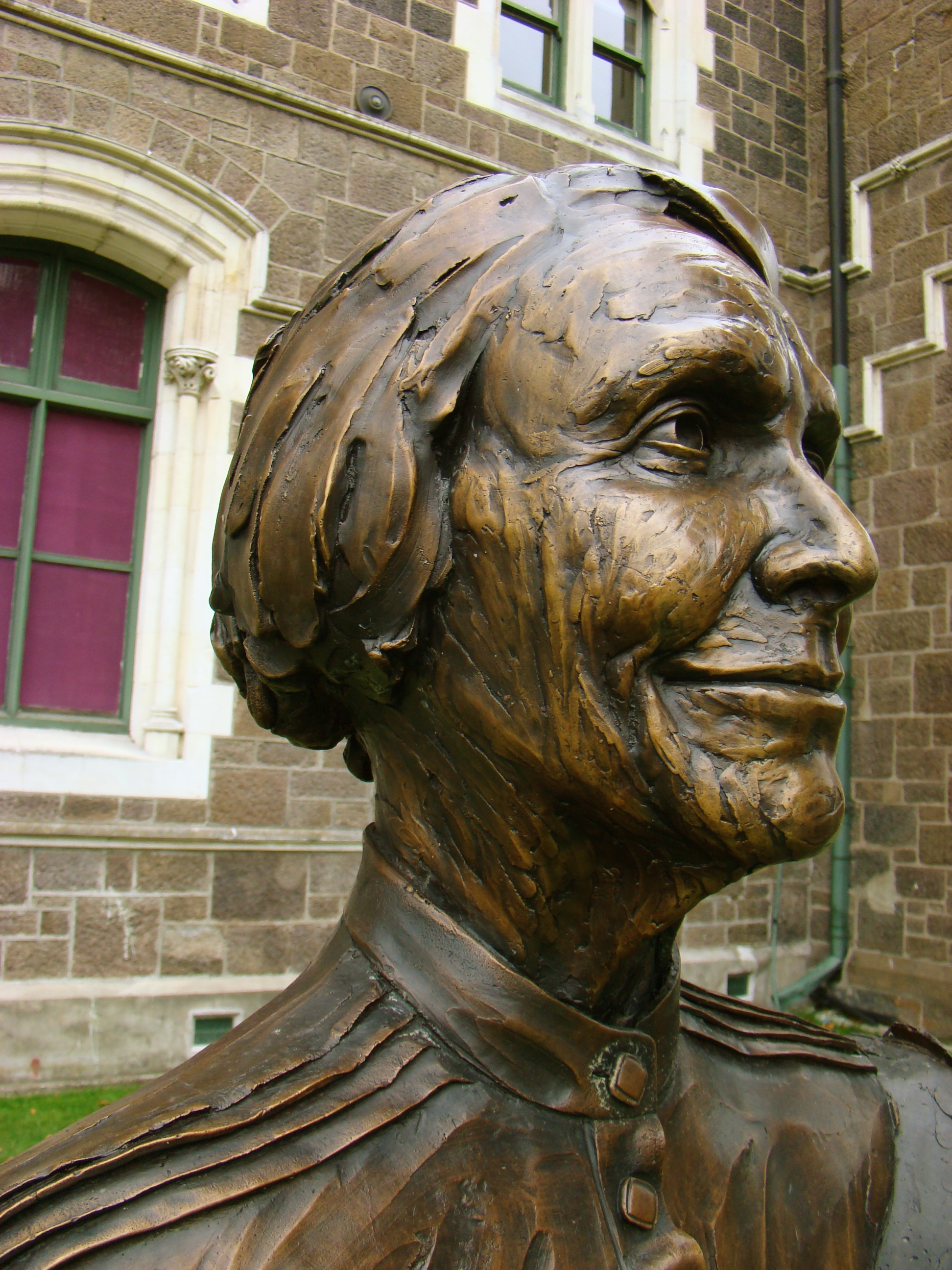
Bronze bust of Elsie Locke as part of the Twelve Local Heroes sculpture

Elsie Locke is the only person who has ever had a park named in their honour by Christchurch City Council during their lifetime. The Elsie Locke Park 43.5280°S 172.6412°E was located on Oxford Terrace in front of the Centennial Pool, but was removed after the 2011 Christchurch earthquake to make way for the Margaret Mahy Playground.

Each year LIANZA gives the Elsie Locke Award for "the most distinguished contribution to non-fiction for young adults", it is presented as part of the New Zealand Book Awards for Children and Young Adults.

In March 2009, Locke was commemorated as one of the Twelve Local Heroes, and a bronze bust of her was unveiled outside the Christchurch Arts Centre.

== Awards ==
In 1995, Locke became the fifth recipient of the Margaret Mahy Award. In 1992 she was awarded the Children's Literature Association's Award for Services to Children's Literature (now Betty Gilderdale Award).

== Bibliography ==
- Watson, C. G. (1949). Locke, Elsie (ed.). Gordon Watson, New Zealander, 1912–45 : his life and writings. Auckland: Communist Party.
- Locke, Elsie (1950). The Shepherd and the Scullery-Maid, 1850–1950 : Canterbury Without Laurels. Christchurch: New Zealand Communist Party Canterbury District.
- Locke, Elsie (1954). The Time of the Child : a sequence of poems. Christchurch.
- Locke, Elsie (1960). Ghosts on the Coast : a family fantasy with the Rouseabouts. Clarity Press.
- Locke, Elsie (1963). Viet-nam. Wellington: Publications Branch Department of Education.
- Locke, Elsie (1965). The Runaway Settlers. London: Jonathan Cape. ISBN 9780730445784.
- Locke, Elsie (1965). Six Colonies in One Country : New Zealand, 1840–1860. Wellington: Government Printer.
- Locke, Elsie (1969). Reference notes to The End of the Harbour : an historical novel for children, and bibliography of material relating to Waiuku and the surrounding area. Christchurch: University of Canterbury.
- Locke, Elsie, Growing Points and Prickles : Life in New Zealand 1920–60 ([Christchurch], Whitcombe and Tombs, 1971).
- Locke, Elsie, and Elizabeth Plumridge, The Roots of the Clover; The story of the Collett sisters and their families (Christchurch, The author, 1971)
- Locke, Elsie, and New Zealand. School Publications Branch, It's the Same Old Earth (Wellington, [Government Printer, 1973).
- Locke, Elsie, and Murray Grimsdale, Maori King and British Queen, Round the World Histories; no. 34 (Amersham, England, Hulton Educational, 1974).
- Locke, Elsie, and David Waddington, Look Under the Leaves (Christchurch, Pumpkin Press, 1975).
- Locke, Elsie, Crayfishermen and the Sea : Interaction of man and environment, Social Studies Resource Books (Christchurch, Whitcoulls, 1976).
- Locke, Elsie, Ugly Little Paua : Moko's Hideout; To Fly to Siberia [and] Tricky Kelly (Christchurch, Whitcoulls, 1976).
- Locke, Elsie, Discovering the Morrisons (and the Smiths and the Wallaces) (Christchurch, 1976).
- Locke, Elsie, The Gaoler (Palmerston North, Dunmore Press, 1978) – a biography of Henry Monson.
- Locke, Elsie, A Land without Taxes : New Zealand from 1800 to 1840, Bulletin for schools B (Wellington [N.Z.], School Publications Branch Department of Education, 1979).
- Locke, Elsie, Student at the Gates (Christchurch, N.Z., Whitcoulls, 1981).
- Locke, Elsie, Journey under Warning : Reference notes, biographies of historical characters, bibliography (Christchurch, The author, 1983).
- Locke, Elsie, and Ken Dawson, The Boy with the Snowgrass Hair (Wellington, N.Z., Price Milburn, 1983).
- Locke, Elsie, A Canoe in the Mist (illustrated by John Shelley, London, Jonathan Cape, 1984).
- Locke, Elsie, The Kauri and the Willow : How we lived and grew from 1801 to 1942 (Wellington [N.Z.], Government Printer, 1984).
- Locke, Elsie, and New Zealand Foundation for Peace Studies, Co-operation & Conflict : Pakeha & Maori in Historical Perspective (Auckland, N.Z., New Zealand Foundation for Peace Studies, 1988).
- Locke, Elsie, Janet Paul, Christine Tremewan, and Alexander Turnbull Library., Mrs Hobson's Album : given to Eliza Hobson by her friends when she returned to England in June 1843 as a remembrance of her time as wife to New Zealand's first governor : reproduced with commentary and catalogue ([Auckland, N.Z.], Auckland University Press in association with the Alexander Turnbull Library, 1989).
- Locke, Elsie, Wira Gardiner, and New Zealand Foundation for Peace Studies, Partnership and peace : essays on biculturalism in Aotearoa – New Zealand (Auckland, N.Z., The Foundation, 1990).
- Locke, Elsie, and David John Waddington, Explorer Zach (Auckland, N.Z., Brick Row, 1990).
- Locke, Elsie, Peace People : A History of Peace Activities in New Zealand (Christchurch, N.Z., Hazard Press, 1992).
- Locke, Elsie, Two Peoples, One Land : A History of Aotearoa/New Zealand especially for young readers Updated ed ([Wellington, N.Z.], GP Publications, 1992).
- Locke, Elsie, Peter Lole, and Rainbow Reading Programme., The Anti-Litterbug, Rainbow reading (Nelson, N.Z., Rainbow Reading Programme, 1995).
- Locke, Elsie, Joe's Ruby (Whatamango Bay, N.Z., Cape Catley, 1995).
- Thorn, Margaret, Elsie Locke, and Jacqueline Matthews, Stick Out, Keep Left (Auckland [N.Z.], Auckland University Press; Bridget Williams Books, 1997).
- Locke, Elsie, and Katarina Mataira, The End of the Harbour : an historical novel for children Rev. ed (Waiuku, N.Z., W.J. Deed Printing, 2001).

== See also ==
- History of New Zealand
