= Organisation for Marxist Unity =

The Organisation for Marxist Unity (OMU) was a communist organisation in New Zealand which founded in the 1975 as the Preparatory Committee for the Formation of the Communist Party of New Zealand (Marxist–Leninist) by former members of the Communist Party of New Zealand (CPNZ) including Don Ross, Alec Ostler and Peter Manson. They were opposed to the CPNZ's break with the Chinese Communist Party after the death of Mao and continued to uphold China under Deng Xiaoping as a model socialist state.

In 1988 they changed the name of the group to the Organisation for Marxist Unity, and ceased production of their monthly newspaper in favour of the quarterly magazine Struggle. Since the mid-1990s the OMU has been in merger negotiations with the Communist Party of Aotearoa, another more recent split from the CPNZ, although as of 2008 no merger had taken place.

In recent years members of the OMU have also been active in the group Campaign Against Foreign Control of Aotearoa (CAFCA).
