= Jim Edwards (political activist) =

New Zealand political activist (1892–1952)

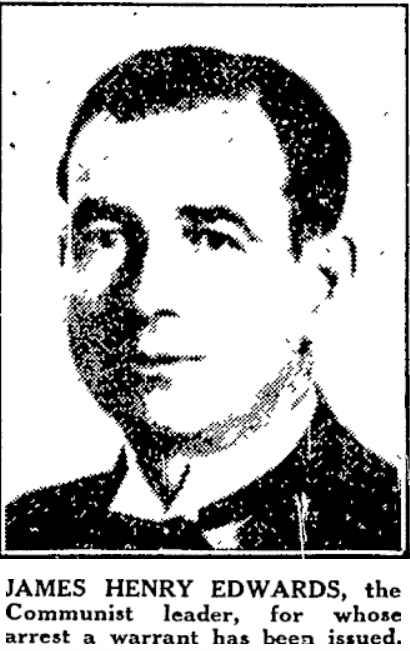
- Mug shot of Edwards, 1932
- Born: James Henry Edwards; 19 February 1892; Islington, London, England
- Died: 29 March 1952 (aged 60); Auckland, New Zealand
- Occupations: Activist; trade unionist; salesman; army officer
- Political party: Communist (1930–1936)
- Other political affiliations: Labour (1920–1930)
- Spouses: Nellie Douglas (m. 1917; div. 1941) Nola Caselli (m. 1941)
- Children: 8
- Military career
- Allegiance: New Zealand
- Branch: New Zealand Army
- Service years: 1940–1947
- Rank: Sapper
- Unit: 3rd New Zealand Expeditionary Force
- Conflicts: World War II

James Henry Edwards (19 February 1892 – 29 March 1952) was a British-born New Zealand Communist activist, trade unionist, salesman, and army officer.

== Early life ==
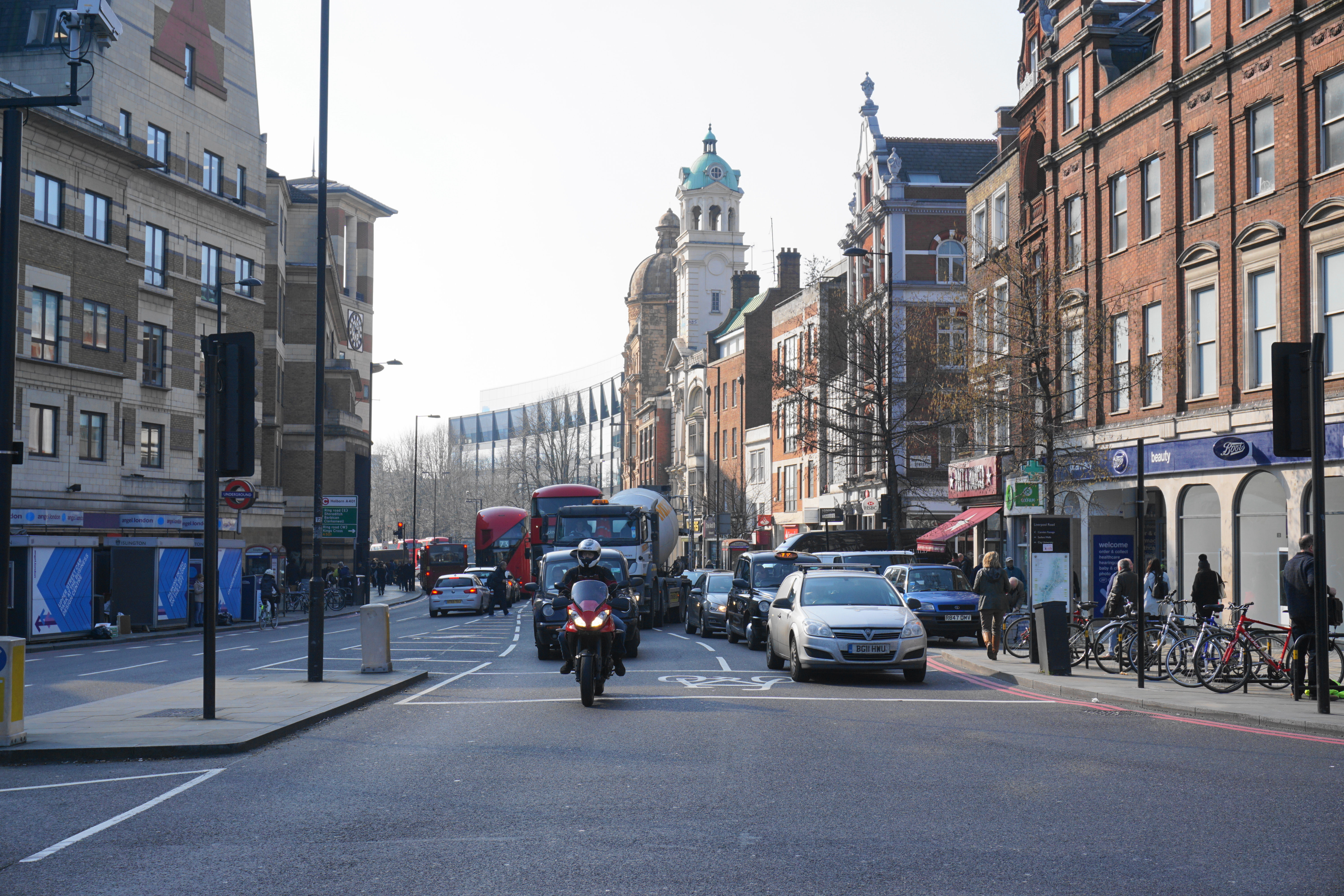
Islington, the place in London where Edwards grew up

James Henry Edwards was born on 19 February 1892 in Islington, London, England. He was the eldest of four children of Ellen (née Sellman) and James John Edwards, a printer. He was baptised on 10 April 1932 at St Mary's Church in Islington into the Church of England.

== Career ==
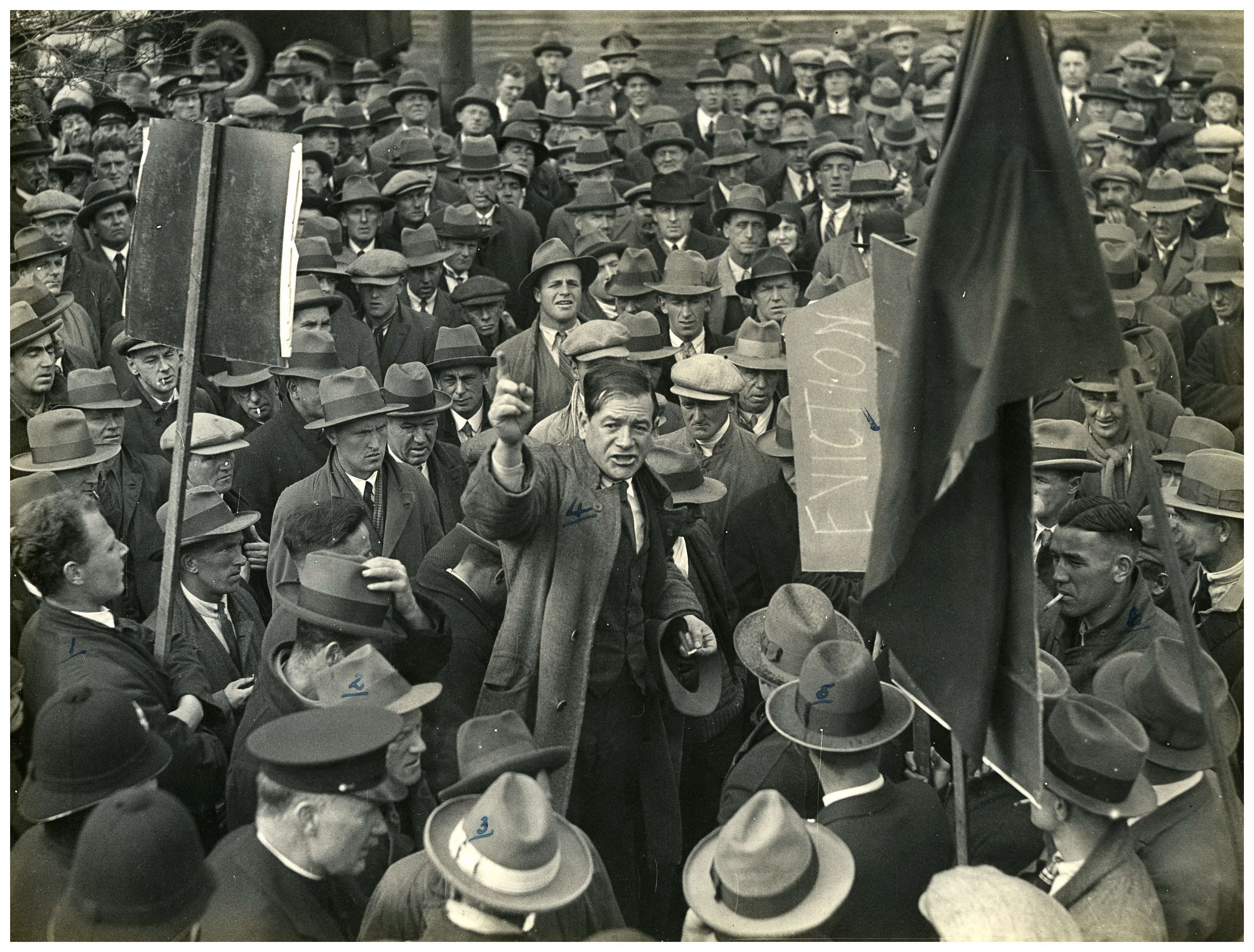
Edwards addressing an anti-government demonstration outside Parliament House, Wellington, 1931

Edwards unsuccessfully contested the Auckland Central electorate in the 1931 election for the Communist Party of New Zealand (CPNZ); of the three candidates, he finished last. At the 1935 local-body elections he was one of three CPNZ candidates for the Auckland City Council. He was unsuccessful, polling only 13.6% but was the highest polling CPNZ candidate.

== Death ==
Edwards died on 29 March 1952, at the age of 60. He was buried at Purewa Cemetery.
