= Frank Lark =

New Zealand politician (1887–1946)

The Honourable Frank Lark
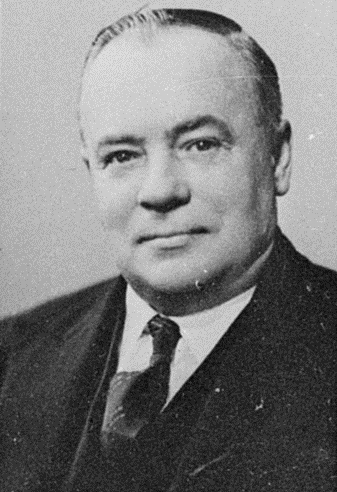

Member of the Legislative Council
- In office 9 March 1936 – 21 March 1946

Personal details
- Born: 1887 Plymouth, Devon, England
- Died: 21 March 1946 (aged 58) Auckland, New Zealand
- Party: Labour Party

Frank Edwin Lark (1887 – 21 March 1946) was a member of the New Zealand Legislative Council from 9 March 1936 to 8 March 1943; and 9 March 1943 to 21 March 1946. He was appointed by the First Labour Government.

== Biography ==
=== Early life ===
He was originally from Plymouth, England, and joined the Royal Navy as a naval rating on HMS Encounter. He then left the service and went to northern Wairoa in 1932 and later moved to Waihi. He joined the Railway Department but left it about 1920 to go farming at Matamata.

=== Political career ===
While in Matamata, he took a keen interest in school and local government affairs, became a member of the school committee, and the chairman and also a member of the Matamata Town Board. He was an energetic worker on behalf of the unemployed. He was elected a member of the Auckland City Council in 1935, but declined to stand for re-election three years later. He was a member of the Auckland Transport Board, serving as deputy chairman for a period. In 1935 Lark was appointed to the Legislative Council.

=== Death ===
Lark died on 21 March 1946 and his ashes were buried at Waikumete Cemetery. He was survived by his wife May, two sons and one daughter.
