= Lois Suckling =

New Zealand optician, family planning reformer

- Born: Sophia Lois Anthony; 12 August 1893; Bondi, New South Wales, Australia
- Died: 20 June 1990 (aged 96); Auckland, New Zealand
- Known for: Optician and family planning reformer

Sophia Lois Suckling (12 August 1893 – 20 June 1990) was a notable New Zealand optician and family planning reformer.

== Early life ==
Sophia Lois Anthony (known as Lois) was born in Bondi, Sydney, New South Wales, Australia on 12 August 1893 to Clara Emma (née Ackland) and Stephen Anthony (formerly Nowinsky), a Polish draughtsman. The family were members of the Plymouth Brethren and in 1900 migrated to Amodeo Bay, on the Coromandel Peninsula, New Zealand, an area where other Brethren were settled.

Her father became an apiarist and her mother encouraged her daughter to love literature and learning which stood her in good stead later in life.

== Career ==
Lois and Edgar Suckling set up an opticians firm, Suckling and Suckling, on Brandon Street, Wellington. Edgar Suckling was a qualified optician, trained in Britain as there was no formal training in the field available at that time in New Zealand. He taught his wife the professional skills and she was able to register as an optometrist in 1924, the first woman in New Zealand to do so, and the only woman to practice for some years following. Some male colleagues were in opposition to her working in the field.

During this time Edgar Suckling was diagnosed with a degenerative disease that would have a significant impact on his ability to work. He eventually began using a wheelchair, and Lois Suckling ran the practice by herself in the 1930s.

By this time Lois Suckling had rejected the beliefs of the Plymouth Brethren and adopted a liberal and humanitarian outlook, advocating for women combining a career with marriage. In 1936 she was one of the founders and first president of the Sex Hygiene and Birth Regulation Society (now the New Zealand Family Planning Association). Suckling held the organisations' meetings in her consulting rooms, with Elsie Freeman (later Locke) as secretary. They planned to 'educate and enlighten the people of New Zealand on the need for birth-control and sex education...so that married people may space or limit their families, and so mitigate the evils of ill-health and poverty.' In 1937 a report of a committee of inquiry into abortion in New Zealand discovered that one pregnancy in five ended in abortion and that a quarter of maternal deaths were caused by septic abortions. This led to significant public debate controversy, but the organisation continued to grow, with support from doctors including Sylvia Chapman and Welton Hogg.

Following her husband's death in 1944, Suckling moved to Britain where she worked as an optician in Camden before retirement. She lived in Arnos Grove in 1951 and Kensington Church Street in 1954.

== Personal life ==
On Lois Anthony married Walter Edgar Suckling, an optician and fellow Brethren on 22 September 1914. The couple had four daughters and a son. In 1918 they moved to Wellington where they set up an opticians business.

Suckling was a member of the Wellington branch of the National Council of Women of New Zealand, a founding member of Soroptomist International (New Zealand). She supported the New Zealand Labour Party, was a member of the Friends of the Soviet Union (New Zealand Section) and the local Fabian Society.

Whilst living in Britain, Suckling explored the country and travelled to United States and in Europe during her holdiays. She retired to Auckland, New Zealand.

Lois Suckling died in Auckland on 20 June 1990.
