= Bill Parry (politician) =

New Zealand politician (1878–1952)

The Honourable Bill Parry
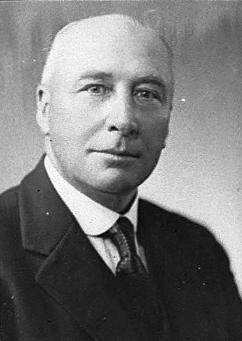
- Photograph of Bill Parry taken in 1935.

13th Minister of Internal Affairs
- In office 6 December 1935 – 13 December 1949
- Prime Minister: Michael Joseph Savage; Peter Fraser
- Preceded by: Alexander Young
- Succeeded by: William Bodkin

2nd Minister of Social Security
- In office 30 April 1940 – 13 December 1949
- Prime Minister: Peter Fraser
- Preceded by: Walter Nash
- Succeeded by: Jack Watts

Member of the New Zealand Parliament for Auckland Central
- In office 17 December 1919 – 4 November 1946
- Preceded by: Albert Glover
- Succeeded by: Bill Anderton

Member of the New Zealand Parliament for Arch Hill
- In office 27 November 1946 – 27 July 1951
- Succeeded by: John Stewart

Personal details
- Born: 1878 Orange, New South Wales, Australia
- Died: 27 November 1952 (aged 73–74) Auckland, New Zealand
- Party: Labour
- Spouse: Georgina Fowke (m. 1906)
- Children: Two daughters

William Edward Parry (1878 – 27 November 1952) was a New Zealand politician and trade unionist.

== Biography ==
=== Early life and career ===
Parry was born at Orange, New South Wales, Australia. He had 12 siblings and the family faced hardship. His father, John Parry, was a goldminer and prospector, and at age 12, Bill Parry left school and went mining himself in Barmedman. A strong, energetic and large sized man, Parry was a noted cyclist in his youth and also became a skilled shooter and angler. He first came to New Zealand in 1902 and lived in Auckland for a short time and went mining in Karangahake. After two years, Parry returned to Australia. On 15 April 1906, he married Georgina Fowke at Wyalong in New South Wales. Later that year, they and some family members arrived in New Zealand.

Parry was a miner at Waihi and Secretary of the Waihi Miners' Union and president of the Waihi Amalgamated Miners' and Workers' Union from 1909 to 1912. He became a miners' inspector and was appointed to the 1911 Royal Commission on Mines. Initially Parry was apprehensive to go on strike at Waihi, however he found himself compelled into taking a more militant position by members of his union that were supportive of the Industrial Workers of the World. Also, in 1911 Parry conducted a tour of the country forming anti-militarist leagues throughout New Zealand. Parry was one of the founders of the New Zealand Federation of Labour (FOL) and was vice president from 1911 to 1913.

He was imprisoned at Mount Eden Prison for four months during the 1912 Waihi miners' strike for the part he played. His leadership and imprisonment during the strike would bestow him with great mana in the labour movement in New Zealand for the remainder of his life. However, he found himself blacklisted in Waihi and then moved to Palmerston North taking up a position as an organiser for the Manawatu Flaxmills Employees' Union. There he became involved in the 1913 waterfront and general strike where the United Federation of Labour sent him to Australia on a fund-raising mission. He joined the Social Democratic Party (SDP) and was a member of the party's national executive.

He moved to Auckland in 1915 to be an agent for the Maoriland Worker newspaper. He opposed conscription during World War I, but not during World War II. When the SDP merged into the new Labour Party in 1916 Parry became a founding member. From 1917 to 1918 he was secretary of the Waikato Flaxmills Employees' Union, after which time he briefly became secretary of the New Zealand Miners' Federation.

During the 1918 influenza epidemic he made a name for himself conducting relief work in Auckland. Parry, along with fellow unionists Michael Joseph Savage and Tom Bloodworth, he disinfected community halls and schoolrooms to enable their use in accommodating influenza victims after hospitals and clinics had reached their capacity.

=== Member of Parliament ===
New Zealand Parliament
| Years | Term | Electorate | Party |
|---|---|---|---|
| 1919–1922 | 20th | Auckland Central | Labour |
| 1922–1925 | 21st | Auckland Central | Labour |
| 1925–1928 | 22nd | Auckland Central | Labour |
| 1928–1931 | 23rd | Auckland Central | Labour |
| 1931–1935 | 24th | Auckland Central | Labour |
| 1935–1938 | 25th | Auckland Central | Labour |
| 1938–1943 | 26th | Auckland Central | Labour |
| 1943–1946 | 27th | Auckland Central | Labour |
| 1946–1949 | 28th | Arch Hill | Labour |
| 1949–1951 | 29th | Arch Hill | Labour |

Parry represented the electorates of Auckland Central from 1919 to 1946, and then Arch Hill from 1946 to 1951, when he retired.

When the First Labour Government was formed after the 1935 election, Parry was appointed Minister of Internal Affairs and Minister in Charge of Pensions. In the latter role, he implemented Social Security in 1938 after it was introduced by Walter Nash. The minor ministerial role was converted to a full role when in June 1946, Parry became Minister of Social Security. Parry lost his ministerial roles when Labour was defeated in the 1949 election.

Parry was not regarded as an outstanding politician or policy creator, but more of an administrator. He did not contribute to Labour's policy development in a major way but was nevertheless Michael Joseph Savage's automatic choice as minister due to their strong friendship and long-standing activism. He was not an ideologue and held beliefs in active and responsible citizenship. He had a broad view of politics and saw socialism as a means of fulfilling the practical needs of the people.

As a minister he advocated for higher pension payments than Savage would allow and was interested in social credit theories. He was likewise inclined to support monetary reform policies, often suggested by John A. Lee, though he staunchly supported Savage in his rift with Lee. He was one of the first to speak at the 1940 party conference in favour of Lee's expulsion. As Minister of Internal Affairs he introduced the Physical Welfare and Recreation Act 1937 which enabled local authorities to finance for recreational facilities of the communities they represented. He was responsible for state funding for the arts and had a productive working relationship with Joseph Heenan his permanent undersecretary.

In 1935, he was awarded the King George V Silver Jubilee Medal.

=== Later life and death ===
Parry died on 27 November 1952 in Auckland. He was survived by his wife and their two daughters.

== Notes ==
Political offices
| Preceded by Alexander Young | Minister of Internal Affairs; 1935–1949 | Succeeded by William Bodkin |
| Preceded by Walter Nash | Minister of Social Security; 1940–1949 | Succeeded by Jack Watts |
New Zealand Parliament
| Preceded by Albert Glover | Member of Parliament for Auckland Central; 1919–1946 | Succeeded by Bill Anderton |
| New constituency | Member of Parliament for Arch Hill; 1946–1951 | Succeeded by John Stewart |
Honorary titles
| Preceded by Peter Fraser | Father of the House; 1950–1951 | Succeeded by Robert McKeen |
