= Young Generation of Indonesian Development =

Young Generation of Indonesian Development Generasi Muda Pembangunan Indonesia
- Leader: Hilman Ismail Metareum
- Secretary General: Aditya Mufti Arifin
- Treasurer: Subarna
- Founded: 18 October 1993
- Headquarters: Jl. Diponegoro No. 60, Menteng, Jakarta
- Ideology: Islamic democracy
- Colours
- Mother party: United Development Party
- Website: http://www.ppgmpi.or.id/

The Young Generation of Indonesian Development (Indonesian: Generasi Muda Pembangunan Indonesia), abbreviated as GMPI, is the youth wing of the United Development Party (PPP). The movement is one of the three youth wings of the party, the others being the Kaaba Youth Force and the Kaaba Youth Movement.

== History ==
=== Formation ===
The organization was founded as a result of the meetings of Islamic youth figures from the United Youth Generation on 18 October 1993. The meeting was initiated by the Djafar Badjeber from Jakarta and Husni Malik from North Sumatra, the respective chairmen of the United Youth Generation in their regions. They invited chairmen of the United Youth branches and United Development Party figures from all over Indonesia. Among the attendees were Ismail Hasan Metareum, Ali Thaher Parasong, Saleh Khalid, Yudo Paripurno, Hamzah Haz, Syafi’i Nongke, Irgan Chairil Mahfudz, and Mansyur K.

The meeting officially formed the GMPI on the same day, with a declaration at Wisma DPR RI. The declaration was signed by 37 figures from 18 different provinces of Indonesia.

=== Registration ===
The organization officially registered itself with an establishment act on 2 January 2004.

== Branches ==
As of 2014, the organization has its provincial branches in Riau, Lampung, Banten, Jakarta, Central Java, East Java, East Nusa Tenggara, West Kalimantan, Central Sulawesi, and South Sulawesi.

== List of Chairman and General Secretary of GMPI ==
Period	Chairman	General Secretary	Source
1993–1999	Saleh Khalid	Djafar Badjeber	
1999–2003	Ali Taher Parasong	Irgan Chairul Mahfiz	
1999–2003	Abdurrahman Syagaff (Note: Acting)	Irgan Chairul Mahfiz	
2003–2008	Irgan Chairul Mahfiz	Siti Nurmila Muslich	
2010–2015	Hilman Ismail Metareum	Aditya Mufti Arifin	
