= New Zealand China Friendship Society =

Organisation in New Zealand

The New Zealand China Friendship Society Inc (NZCFS) became an Incorporated Society on 10 February 1977. There are currently 14 branches located throughout New Zealand: Auckland, Tauranga, Hamilton, Rotorua, Taranaki, Hawkes Bay, Whanganui, Wairarapa, Manawatu, Wellington, Nelson, Christchurch, Dunedin and Timaru.

The aims of the New Zealand China Friendship Society are:

- To promote friendship, understanding and goodwill between the peoples of China and New Zealand by encouraging visits and exchanges of ideas, information, culture and trade between the two countries.
- To foster interest in and promote the study of China, its history, culture, political and social structures – past and present.
- To support specific aid projects in China.
- To promote the study of the Chinese language by New Zealanders and advanced English studies in this country by Chinese
- To foster on-going development of all sister-city links between New Zealand and China.
- To assist both visiting students and new migrants from China requiring help to fit into New Zealand society
