= Arch Hill, New Zealand =

Coordinates: 36°51′50″S 174°44′51″E

Arch Hill
- Suburb
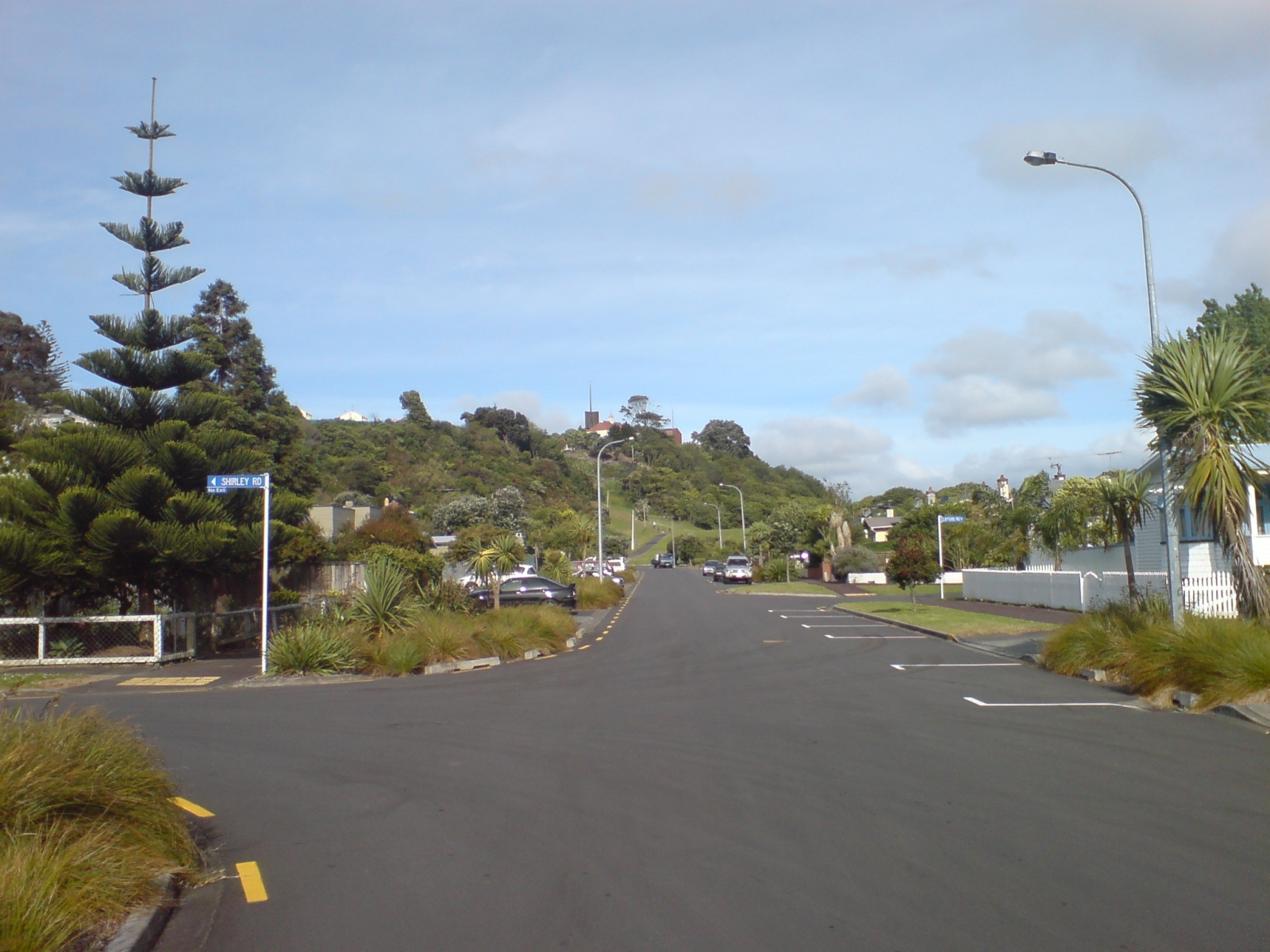
- Looking east along Ivanhoe Road towards Arch Hill Reserve.
- Interactive map of Arch Hill
- Country: New Zealand
- City: Auckland Council

Grey Lynn	Ponsonby	Newton
Grey Lynn	Arch Hill	Newton
Kingsland	Kingsland	Eden Terrace

Arch Hill is a small suburb of Auckland, New Zealand. Arch Hill is under the local governance of the Auckland Council. The area is called Arch Hill due to its "natural features".

== Demographics ==
Arch Hill is covered by the Grey Lynn East and the Karangahape statistical areas, but these also include areas outside this suburb.

== History ==
In 1730 Arch Hill may have been the site of the "Broken Calabash [Attack]": Te Ipu Pakore. This battle between two warring Māori iwi (tribes) probably happened along this ridge, possibly around the Arch Hill area.

In the 1880s, Arch Hill was part of an 80-acre farm which stretched from what is now Great North Road, down the gulley where the Northwestern Motorway cuts through, and up the other side to the Morningside area. It was owned by Joseph and Jane Young who had arrived in Auckland in 1842, the farm was called 'Arch Hill', after the farm Joseph had been raised on near Strabane, County Londonderry, Ireland. Joseph died in 1880 on his Arch Hill property at the age of 78. In 1885 their son, Joseph built a house called Breveg Villa (Jane's maiden name was Breveg) which is located at 47 Western Springs Road, which is now separated from Arch Hill by the motorway.

Most of the houses on the Arch Hill area date from around the turn of the 20th century and many are small workers' cottages or wooden villas; sections are often tiny and without off-street parking. As Arch Hill faces southeast (away from the sun) it is and always was a less desirable location than either neighbouring Grey Lynn or Kingsland. Some light industrial commercial premises have replaced parts of the housing stock with one- & two-storey commercial properties and more recently apartment complexes have been built.

Before the Northwestern Motorway was cut through Arch Hill Gully at the bottom of the suburb in 1979, many of the streets running down from Great North Road linked up with those in Kingsland. Now the only through road is Bond Street; the others have become cul-de-sacs.

Arch Hill was initially governed by the Arch Hill Highway Board. The Arch Hill Highway District was formed 8 July 1871 and was dissolved in 1913 when Arch Hill was amalgamated with the City of Auckland. In 1874 part of the area split off to become the Point Chevalier Road District.

The Arch Hill electorate was created for the 1946 elections, formed out of portions of the Auckland Central, Auckland West, and Grey Lynn electorates.

The Arch Hill Hotel was a landmark on the corner of Great North Road and Tuarangi Road at what is now the Surrey Crescent shops. Built in the 19th century it still stands on its original site although in a modified state. It closed around 1900 when the residents of the area voted to go dry in a referendum. As the Old Stone Jug Pub at Western Springs no longer operated this resulted in there being no pubs between the Gluepot at Three lamps, The Star at the corner of Karangahape Road & Ponsonby Road and the Avondale Hotel.

== Education ==
The local secondary schools are Western Springs College, Mount Albert Grammar School, St Paul's College and St Mary's College.
