= Kaaba Youth Movement =

Youth wing of United Development Party

Kaaba Youth Movement Gerakan Pemuda Ka'bah
- Leader: Syahrial Agamas
- Secretary General: Haris Setiawan
- Founded: 29 March 1982
- Headquarters: Sunan Giri Road No.1, Jati, Pulo Gadung District, East Jakarta, Jakarta
- Ideology: Islamic Nationalism
- Colours
- Mother party: United Development Party

The Kaaba Youth Movement (Indonesian: Gerakan Pemuda Ka'bah), abbreviated as GPK, is the youth wing of United Development Party (PPP) or P3. The movement is one of the three youth wings of the party, the other being Kaaba Youth Forces and the Young Generation of Indonesian Development. The movement was frequently used by the Officials and the Big Family of the Kaaba Party as unofficial bodyguards for them and their family.

During the New Order, GPK frequently uses violence to harass counter-Islam movements, especially the government. After the reformation, GPK still uses the same methods to harass "Islam-masked infidels and populists".

Even though GPK is the youth wing of the PPP, the political views of GPK frequently clash with PPP's view.

== History ==
=== Formation ===
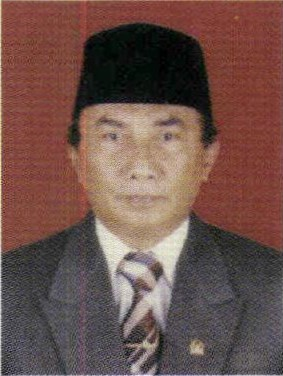
Tosari Widjaja rejected the influence of GPK in Ansor.

GPK was formed on 29 March 1982, initiated by Jailani Naro, as the chairman of PPP. He used GPK as an approach to strengthen relationship with Nahdlatul Ulama, by requesting to the chairman of Ansor, the youth wing of NU, to make a statement that support GPK. Tosari Widjaja, the chairman of Ansor at that time, rejected the offer by claiming that such statement is very exaggerative. The rejection of the offer aggravates the conflict between the Parmusi majority faction in PPP and NU, which led to the withdrew of NU from PPP.

=== New Order ===
During the New Order, GPK was associated with terror acts by the security forces. The security forces interprets the GPK abbreviation as Gerakan Pengacau Keamanan (transl. Security Disrupting Movement). GPK was often associated with independence movements on the Indonesian provinces, which were deemed as terrorists.

==== BCA Glodok incident ====
On October 4, 1984, GPK launched its first action by bombing one of BCA's headquarter in Glodok, followed by similar actions in BCA's branches on Gajah Mada and Pecenongan, causing two deaths. After investigations, police found out that the perpetrators of this act were Muhammad Jayadi, Chairul Yunus, Tasrif Tuasikal, Hasnul Arifin. Jayadi was member of the GPK, and sentenced to 15 years in prison. The case also resulted in the imprisoning of several members of Petition of Fifty, including HM Sanusi, AM Fatwa, dan HR Dharsono.

They confessed that the act was done in response to the Tanjung Priok massacre, where many GPK members were killed. BCA was chosen as the target because BCA belongs to one of Soeharto's cronies, Sudono Salim.

=== Post-New Order era ===
After the New Order, GPK was still perceived by the public society as a riot organization. This image appeared due to a mistake in the rules of GPK from 1999 until 2004. Several individuals that caused GPK to generate such image was not given any serious punishment from its mother party and continue its membership in the GPK. This bad image contributed to the decrease in number of votes gained by the United Development Party, from 10.71% in 1999 to 8.15% in 2004.

==== Support for Habibie's presidency ====
As a dominant youth force in Indonesia, GPK declared its support to Habibie's presidency in the 1999 Indonesian legislative election. Prior to the 1999 General Session of the People's Representative Council, the Jakarta branch of GPK held a rally on 9 October 1999, urging the nation not to interfere the process of Habibie's candidacy as president, and also requested that whatever the result of the session, there must be no riots preceding it. Ahmad Murda, chairman of the Jakarta branch of GPK promised that the rioting forces will be "faced directly by GPK".

==== Support for Prabowo-Sandi ====
On the 2019 Indonesian general election, several branches of GPK in Jambi and Central Java, led by Syihabudin as the chairman of GPK, declared their support for Prabowo's presidency in the election. The declaration was attended by two sons of KH. Maimoen Zubair, the chairman of the PPP Sharia Council. Other members of PPP also attended the declaration, such as, Humphrey Djemat, Bahtiar Hamzah, and Mudrick Sangidoe. They claimed that the support was due to the "betrayal" of Jokowi to Romahurmuziy, the chairman of PPP. After the arrest of Romahurmuziy in a corruption case, several members of Jokowi's campaign team requested the removal of Jokowi's face in PPP campaign banners and posters. GPK also obliged that all of their branches should support Prabowo.

PPP responds to this by stating that "Syihabudin's term as the chairman of GPK has expired, and therefore they were deemed illegal". GPK's act in Jambi and Central Java wasn't recognized by the PPP, and PPP considered them as a group of leftovers from the PPP faction of Humphrey Djemat that supports Prabowo, and struggled against the government backed faction of Romahurmuziy that supports Jokowi. This support showed that even though the conflict between Djan Humphrey and Romahurmuziy has been reconciled through the 3rd Mukernas, the conflict still exists in the grassroots of PPP. PPP resolved this problem by refreshing the ranks of GPK and held the consolidation of branches of GPK, to support Jokowi as president, and align the visions of PPP underbouws.

== Conflict ==
=== Indonesian Democratic Party of Struggle ===
The members of GPK frequently clashed with the cadres of Indonesian Democratic Party of Struggle (PDI-P) since 2014, regardless of whether PPP and PDI-P are in one faction or different factions. GPK stated that such clash was caused by members of GPK that want revenge against their fallen GPK friends. GPK launched the attack by attacking back PDIP or sweep the village they alleged to contain the perpetrators of attack.
