= Sid Scott =

New Zealand communist, journalist and editor

Sidney Wilfred Scott (20 July 1900 – 17 September 1970) was a New Zealand communist, journalist and editor.

== Biography ==
He was born in Ifield, Sussex, England in 1900.

On 14 July 1928 police seized books and papers of "seditious nature" from his home on Onehunga. He was charged with possession of books with intention for sale or distribution, and with importing books which advocated violence. Scott admitted to two charges and pleaded not guilty on the third, but was convicted of it regardless. The third charge related to a communist training manual published by the Communist Party of Australia. Upon conviction, he was fined £14 (around $1400 in 2019).
