= Crime museum =

The Crime Museum is a private museum of the Metropolitan Police in London.

Crime museum may also refer to:

- Fürth Crime Museum, a museum in Fürth, Germany
- Vienna Crime Museum, a museum in Vienna, Austria
- Zürich Crime Museum, a museum in Zurich, Switzerland
- Meiji University Museum, a museum in Tokyo, Japan, part of which was formally called Crime Museum

== See also ==
- National Museum of Crime and Punishment, a museum in the United States
- The Museum of Crime, a 1945 Mexican film
- List of police museums
