= List of police museums =

Police museums display police memorabilia related to a local police department or the history of law enforcement or emergency services in an area.

== Canada ==
- Ontario Provincial Police Museum, Canada
- The Toronto Police Museum & Discovery Centre
- RCMP Heritage Centre, Regina, Saskatchewan
- Rotary Museum of Police and Corrections, Prince Albert, Saskatchewan
- Vancouver Police Museum
- Winnipeg Police Museum

== United Kingdom ==
- Bow Street Museum of Crime and Justice, London
- Glasgow Police Museum, Scotland (entry free)
- Greater Manchester Police Museum, Manchester, England
- Hampshire Police and Fire Heritage Trust, housed in the Solent Sky Museum
- Kent Police Museum, Chatham, Kent, England
- Lancashire Police Museum, Lancaster, England
- Metropolitan Police Museum, London
- National Emergency Services Museum, Sheffield, England
- Thames Valley Police Museum, Berkshire
- West Midlands Police Museum, Birmingham, England
- The Museum of Policing in Devon & Cornwall, Devon, England

== United States ==
- Alaska State Troopers Museum
- The Greater Cincinnati Police Historical Society Museum
- Cleveland Police Historical Society Museum
- Maryland State Police Museum, Pikesville
- National Law Enforcement Museum, Washington, DC
- New York City Police Museum
- San Diego Police Museum
- San Diego County Sheriff's Museum
- Seattle Metropolitan Police Museum
- Texas Ranger Hall of Fame and Museum
- Phoenix Police Museum

== Elsewhere ==
- Cyprus Police Museum
- Hong Kong Police Museum
- Garda Museum, Dublin, Ireland
- National Police Museum India
- New Zealand Police Museum
- Police Heritage Centre (Singapore Police Force)
- Police Museum (Stockholm), Sweden
- Police Museum (Tampere), Finland
- Venlo Police Museum, Netherlands
- World Police Museum, Taiwan
- Sindh Police Museum, Pakistan
- Punjab Police Museum, Pakistan

== See also ==
- Crime museum (disambiguation)
- Fire museum
