= Fred Evans (union worker) =

Australian industrial worker who died in the Waihi miners' strike

Fredrick George Evans (11 February 1881 – 13 November 1912) was an Australian industrial worker who rose to prominence for his role and death in the Waihi miners' strike. To date he is one of the only two people to die in an industrial dispute in New Zealand's history.

== Early life ==
Born in 1881 in Ballarat, Victoria, the younger of twin boys born to Frederick and Catherine (née Dickson) Evans, Evans lived in his native Australia until 1909 when he moved to New Zealand with his wife and two children. After three years living in New Zealand Evans found a job as a stationary engine driver at the Waihi goldmine. It was here that his trade union activity was to bring him to public attention.

== Waihi Trade Union ==
Evans was a member of the Waihi Trade Union, affiliated with the militant New Zealand Federation of Labour and in opposition to Evans' employer the Waihi Goldmine Company. In May 1912, a number of stationary engine drivers who rejected the Federation of Labour's strong positions established a breakaway union. Although the Waihi Goldmining Company claimed to have no involvement in the breakaway union, saying that it was a matter of union politics, many workers believed that the company was attempting to split the union, and called a strike. Evans refused to join the new stationary engine drivers union and worked as a provision storekeeper and newspaper contributor for the Waihi Trade Union.

On 12 November, known as "Black Tuesday", a group of armed non-union workers and police attacked the union hall, which was defended by a small group of union workers (also armed). Thomas Johnston, a non-union worker, was shot in the knee, and a police constable was shot in the stomach. The shots are believed to have been fired by Evans who was then beaten to the ground by Constable Gerald Wade and trampled by the men running through the hall. Evans was left for an hour and a half in police cells before being taken to hospital. He never regained consciousness and died the following day. Wade was found to have been "fully justified in striking deceased down".

== Funeral and legacy ==
The Federation of Labour organised a funeral in Auckland at Waikaraka cemetery on 17 November, where thousands of mourners lined the streets. May Evans was given £1100 which had been raised by unionists in order to assist her and her children. Evans was later held by the hardliners up as a hero and a martyr, with Bob Semple saying that Evans had been "doing his duty and should have shot more of them".

For six months in 2012 the New Zealand Police Museum held an exhibition to remember Evans and the Waihi strike.

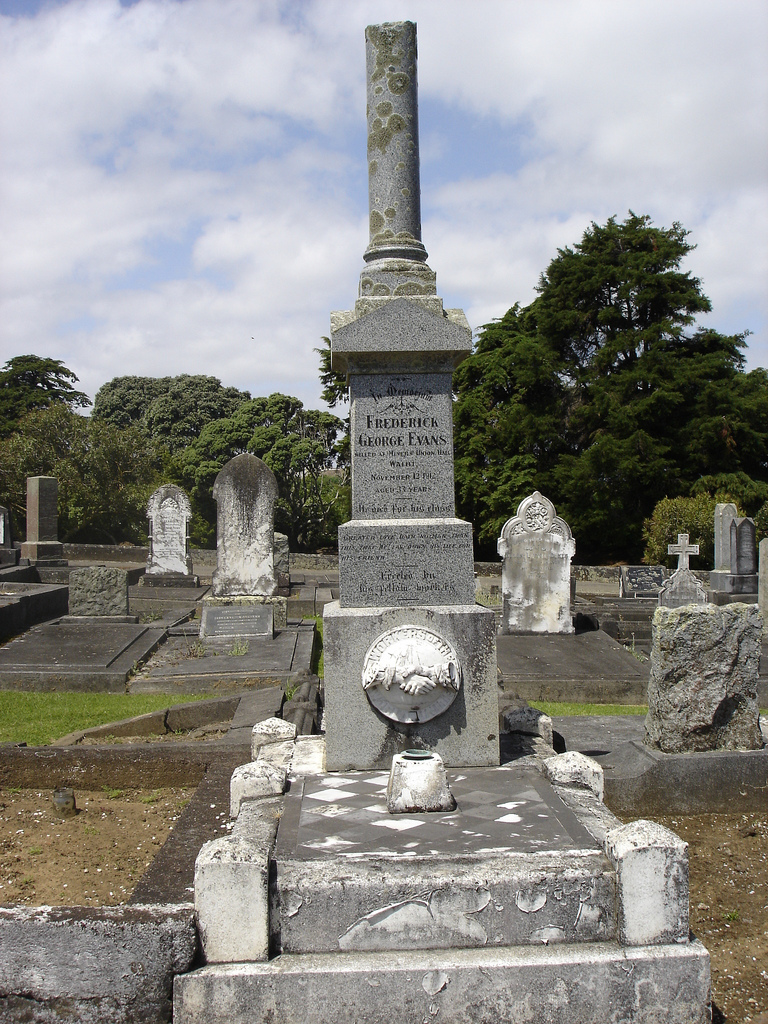
Grave of Fred Evans

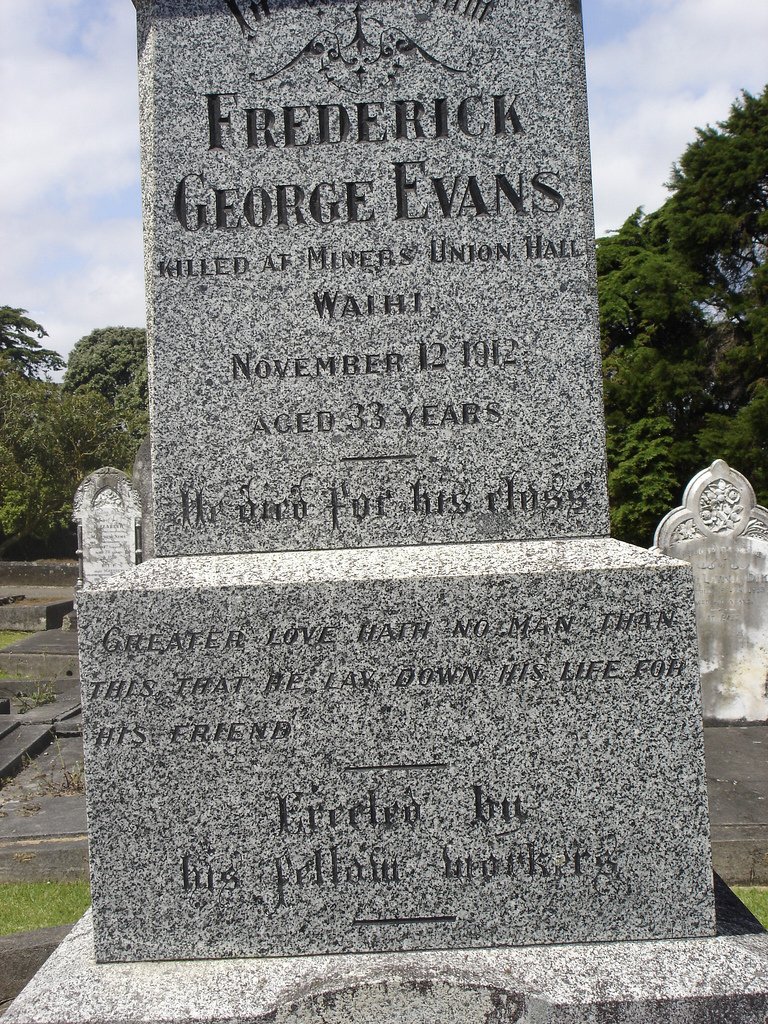
Close up, Grave of Fred Evans

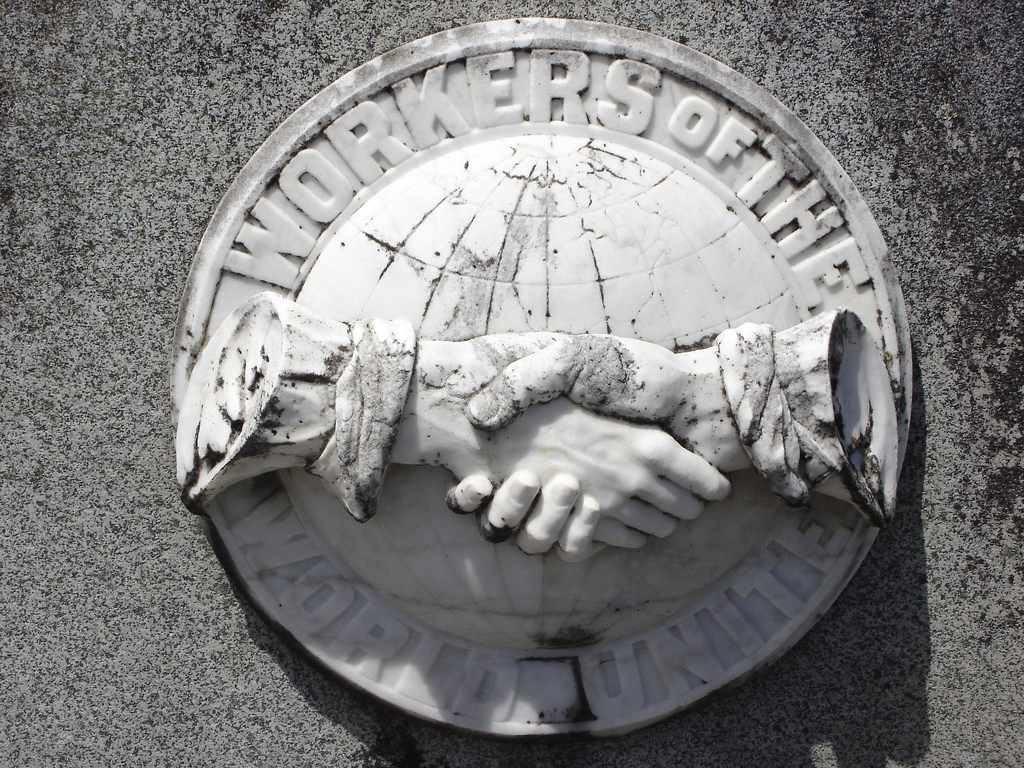
Close up – Embellishment, Grave of Fred Evans

== See also ==
- Waihi miners' strike
- Trade Union
