= David White (domestic abuse campaigner) =

New Zealand domestic violence prevention campaigner

David White MNZM
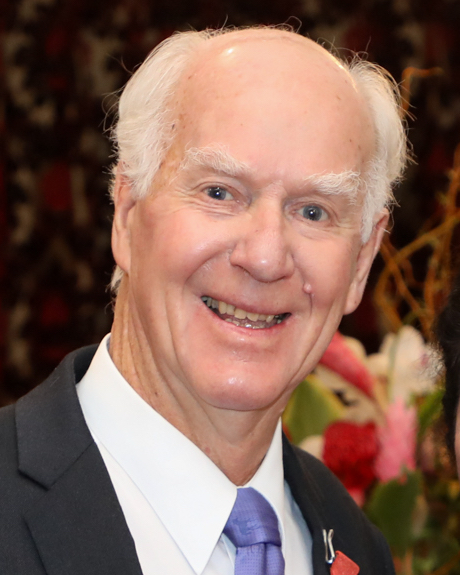
- White in 2023
- Born: David John White; 1944 (age 81–82)
- Occupations: Domestic violence prevention campaigner; author
- Known for: Anti-domestic violence advocacy following the murder of his daughter

David John White MNZM (born 1944) is a New Zealand domestic violence prevention advocate and author. He became known for his campaigning following the murder of his daughter, Helen Meads, in 2009. White has worked throughout New Zealand to raise awareness of family violence and its prevention. In 2023, he was appointed a Member of the New Zealand Order of Merit for services to the prevention of family violence.

== Early life ==
White worked as a bookseller for Whitcombe and Tombs in Wellington before running his own bookshop.

== Advocacy ==
In September 2009, White’s daughter, Helen Meads, was murdered by her husband, Greg Meads, at their home in Matamata. The murder occurred shortly after Helen expressed her intention to leave the relationship. The case brought significant media attention and later inspired White’s advocacy.

After the death of his daughter, White became an outspoken campaigner against domestic violence. He has written two books on the subject, petitioned MPs, and spoken to schools, prisons, community groups, and government agencies. He also addressed the national family violence specialist course run by the New Zealand Police at the Royal New Zealand Police College. In 2019, he conducted a 14-week speaking tour titled "Harm Ends – Futures Begin", visiting all 71 electorates in New Zealand.

White has been a White Ribbon Campaign ambassador since 2011. He has also served as a trustee and ambassador for Grandparents Raising Grandchildren Trust NZ. White also contributed to the Ruapehu Whānau Transformation Plan, a five-year community-led initiative aimed at reducing domestic violence, which met its key targets by the end of its term.

== Honours and awards ==
In 2020, White was nominated for the New Zealander of the Year award. In the 2023 King's Birthday Honours, he was appointed a Member of the New Zealand Order of Merit, for services to the prevention of family violence.

== Personal life ==
White resides in Matamata with his wife, Pam. Following their daughter’s death, they became caregivers to their granddaughters. Though largely retired from active campaigning, he continues to support initiatives aimed at ending family violence.

== Selected publications ==
- White, David (2024). Helen: The Helen Meads Tragedy. Matilda Press. ISBN 9781877378508.
- White, David (2016). Family Violence: Lifting New Zealand's Dark Cloud. Renaissance Publishing. ISBN 9780994133403.
