= Nonaka =

Nonaka (written: 野中 lit. "in the middle of a field") is a Japanese surname. Notable people with the surname include:

- Ai Nonaka (野中 藍, born 1981), Japanese voice actress
- Emi Nonaka (野中 絵美, born 1984), Japanese ice hockey player
- Hiromu Nonaka (野中 広務, 1925–2018), Japanese politician
- Ikujiro Nonaka (野中 郁次郎, 1935–2025), Japanese writer and business theorist
- Kingo Nonaka (1889–1977), Mexican combat medic and photographer
- Masahiro Nonaka (野中 政宏, born 1968), Japanese voice actor
- Masazō Nonaka (野中 正造, 1905–2019), Japanese hotel manager and supercentenarian
- Miho Nonaka (野中 生萌, born 1997), Japanese sport climber
- Shigeru Nonaka (born 1970), Japanese golfer
- Tomoso Nonaka (野中ともそ), Japanese novelist and illustrator
- Tomoyo Nonaka (野中 ともよ, born 1954), Japanese television personality and chief executive
- Tori Nonaka, American sport shooter

== Fictional characters ==
- Yuki Nonaka (野中 柚希), a character in the light novel series The Testament of Sister New Devil
