= Kent Police Museum =

Coordinates: 51.3154°N 0.8940°E

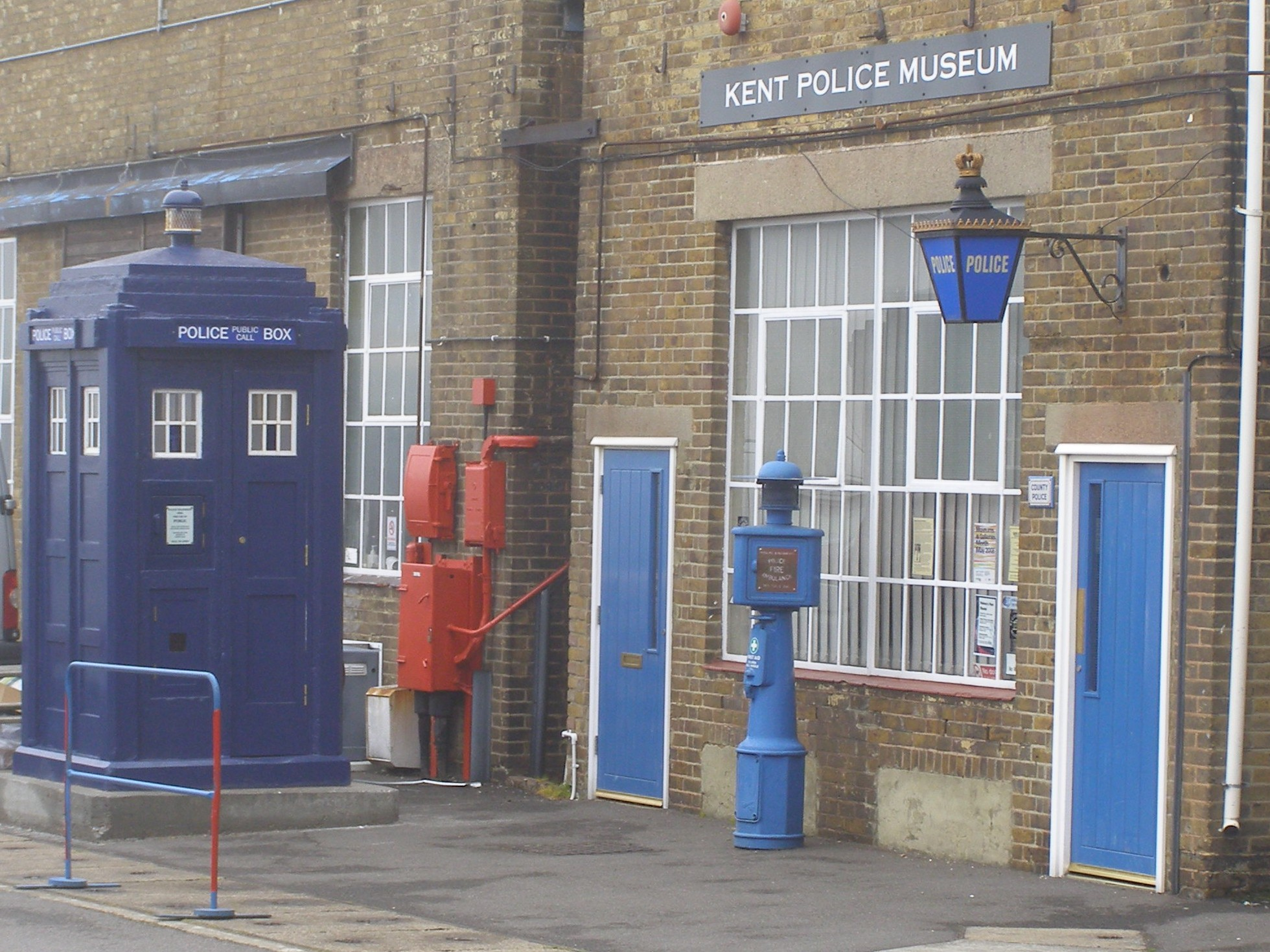
- Established: 1973
- Location: Faversham Police Station, Kent, England
- Type: Police museum
- Key holdings: History of Kent County Constabulary and 14 earlier borough/city forces
- Collections: Uniforms, equipment, medals, photographs, crime scene evidence, and charge books

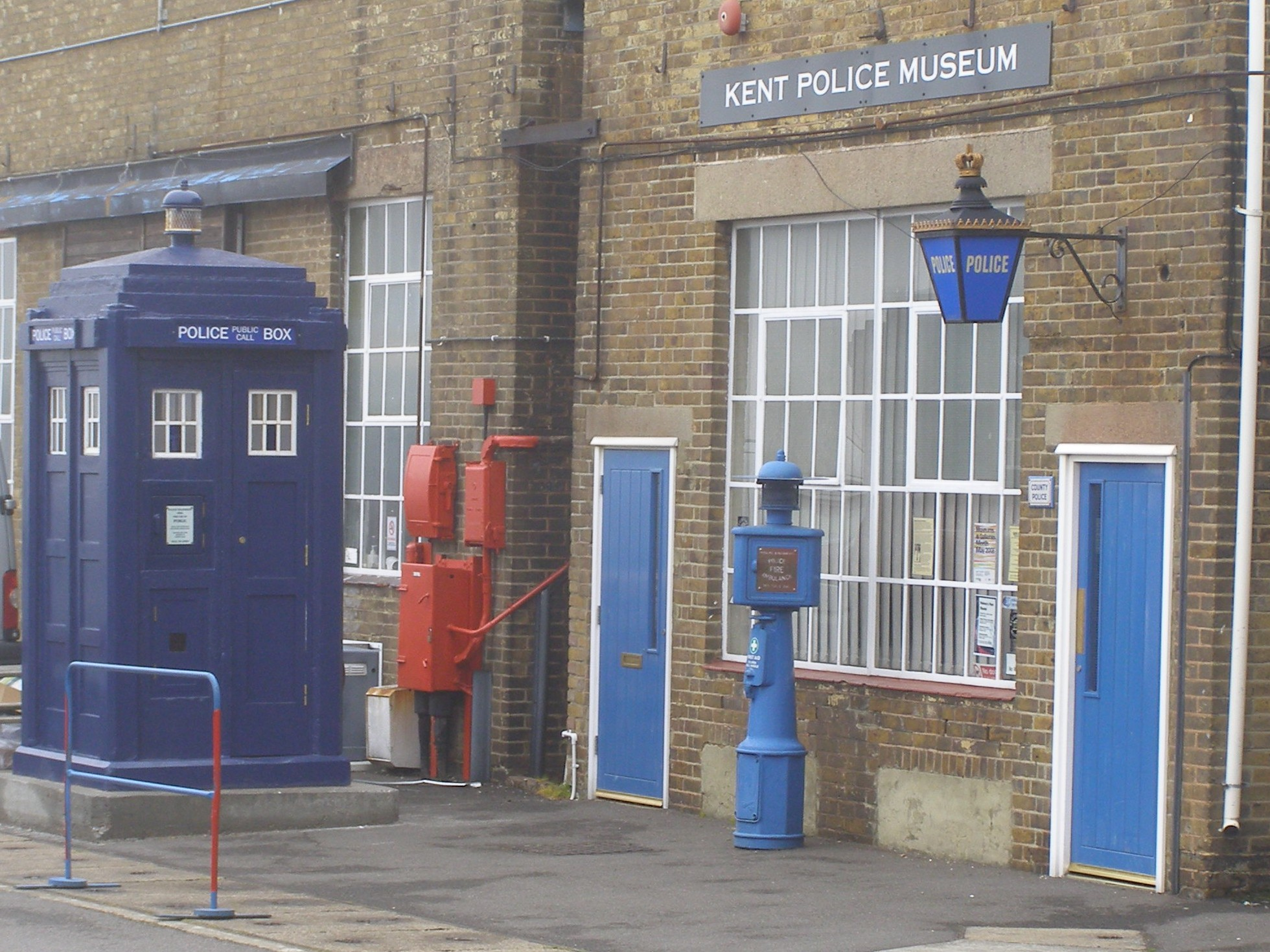
Kent Police Museum in 2008, at Chatham

The Kent Police Museum is a museum of police history located at Faversham Police Station in Kent, England. It captures the history of the county's police force, starting in 1857 with the establishment of the Kent County Constabulary.

== Collections ==
The museum includes displays on the history of the Kent County Constabulary and the fourteen earlier borough or city police forces, all of which had amalgamated with the constabulary by 1943.

The museum's memorabilia collections include uniforms, equipment, medals, photographs, scenes of crime evidence, and occurrence and charge books. Artefacts have been donated from police departments and from retired officers and their families.

== History ==
The museum first opened in 1973 at the Kent Police headquarters in Maidstone. The museum closed in 1992 due to space constraints and then reopened on 26 July 1994 at the Chatham Historic Dockyard, a maritime museum in Chatham, after the Dockyard Trust granted the use of an old boiler house.

It relocated to a temporary accommodation back at the Maidstone headquarters in September 2015 and then moved to its current location in Faversham on 8 December 2016.
