= Meiji University =

Private research university in Tokyo, Japan

Coordinates: 35.697474°N 139.761588°E

- 明治大学
- Former names: Meiji Law School (1881–1903)
- Motto: 権利自由、独立自治
- Motto in English: Rights, Liberty, Independence and Self-governance
- Type: Private research university
- Established: 1881; 145 years ago
- President: Ueno Masao
- Faculty: 2,897 (Spring 2020)
- Undergraduates: 30,010 (Spring 2020)
- Location: Chiyoda, Suginami, Nakano, and Kawasaki, Greater Tokyo, Japan
- Campus: Urban
- Colours: Shikon (bluish purple)
- Mascot: Meijirō
- Website: meiji.ac.jp meiji.ac.jp/english

Meiji University (Japanese: 明治大学, Hepburn: Meiji Daigaku (Note: Japanese pronunciation: [mei.(d)ʑi daꜜi.ɡa.kɯ, meː-, -ŋa.kɯ])) is a private research university in Chiyoda, Tokyo, Japan. Originally founded as Meiji Law School (明治法律学校, Meiji Hōritsu Gakkō) by three lawyers in 1881, it became a university in April 1920.

As of May 2023, Meiji has 32,261 undergraduate students and 2,635 postgraduate students. The university consists of 10 undergraduate, 12 graduate, and 4 professional graduate schools, and operates on four campuses around the Greater Tokyo Area: Surugadai, Izumi, Ikuta, and Nakano. Meiji University is the country's most applied-to university, with applications to its undergraduate degrees amounting to approximately 100,000 annually. Meiji is a part of the Top Global University Project of Japan's Ministry of Education, Culture, Sports, Science and Technology. As of 2021, 270 Meiji alumni have competed in the Olympics, garnering 40 medals: 14 gold, 13 silver, and 13 bronze.

== Academics ==
=== Undergraduate schools ===
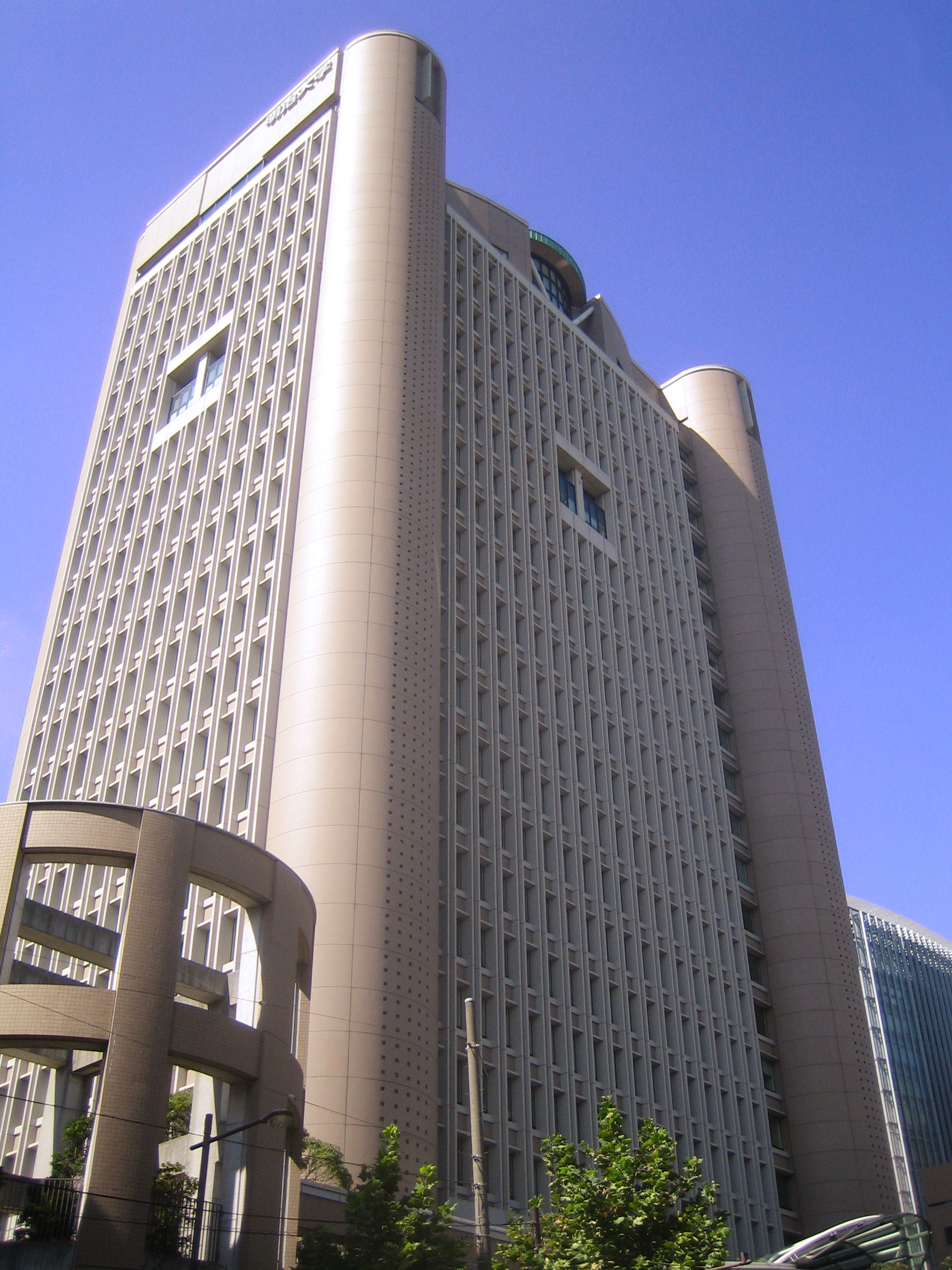
Meiji University School House (Liberty Tower)

- School of Law
  - Businesses Law Course
  - International Relations Law Course
  - Public Service Law Course
  - Law and Information Course
  - Pre-Law School Course
- School of Commerce
  - Applied Economics Course
  - Marketing Course
  - Finance & Insurance Course
  - Global Business Course
  - Management Course
  - Accounting Course
  - Creative Business Course
- School of Political Science and Economics
  - Department of Political Science
  - Department of Economics
  - Department of Local Governance
- School of Arts and Letters
  - Department of Literature
  - Department of History and Geography
  - Department of Social Psychology
- School of Science and Technology
  - Department of Electrical Engineering
  - Department of Electronics and Communication Engineering
  - Department of Mechanical Engineering
  - Department of Precision Engineering
  - Department of Architecture
  - Department of Industrial Chemistry
  - Department of Information Science
  - Department of Mathematics
  - Department of Physics
- School of Agriculture
  - Department of Agriculture
  - Department of Agricultural Chemistry
  - Department of Life Sciences
  - Department of Food and Environmental Policy
- School of Business Administration
  - Department of Business Administration
  - Department of Accounting
  - Department of Public Management
- School of Information and Communication
- School of Global Japanese Studies
  - Department of Global Japanese Studies
- School of Interdisciplinary Mathematical Sciences

=== Graduate schools ===
- Graduate School of Law
- Graduate School of Commerce
- Graduate School of Political Science and Economics
- Graduate School of Business Administration
- Graduate School of Arts and Letters
- Graduate Schools of Informatics and Communication
- Graduate School of Science and Technology
- Graduate School of Agriculture
- Graduate School of Advanced Mathematical Sciences
- Graduate School of Humanities
- Graduate School of Global Japanese Studies
- Graduate School of Global Governance

=== Professional Graduate Schools ===
- Graduate School of Governance Studies
- Graduate School of Global Business
- Graduate School of Professional Accountancy
- Law School

== Campus life ==
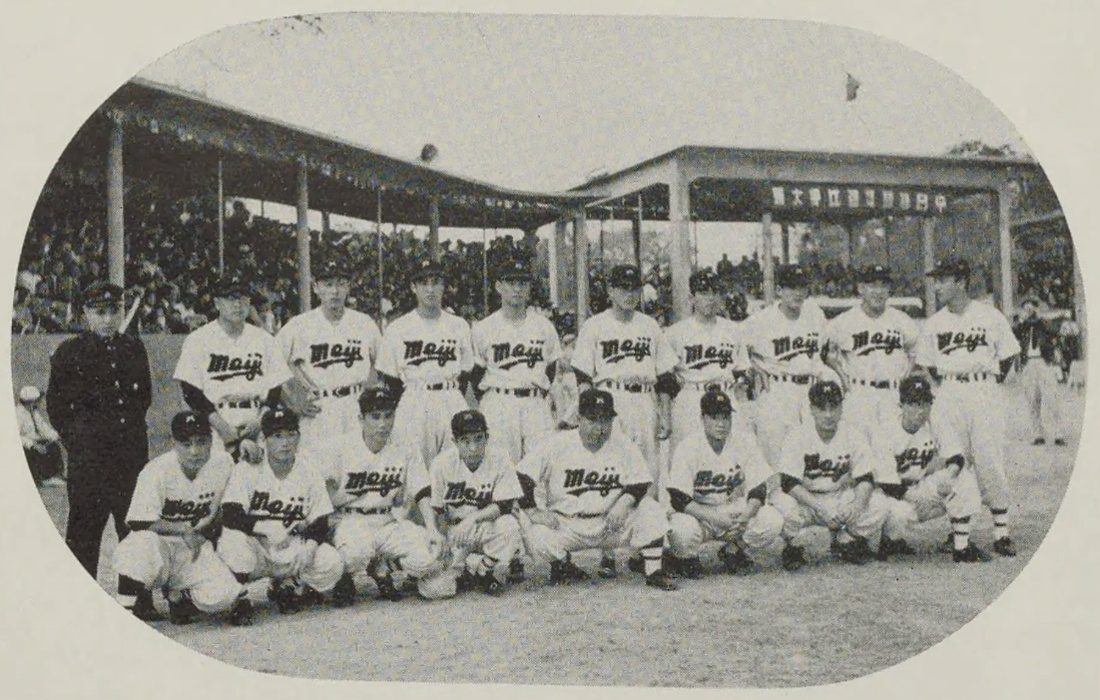
Meiji University Baseball Team in 1956 (Tainan Municipal Baseball Stadium)

Meiji University Baseball Team belongs to the Tokyo Big6 Baseball League. Every year, rugby union and baseball matches Meisōsen (明早戦) against Waseda University attract support among its students. It also has a successful judo team.

In 2004, Meiji University reorganised existent three museum collections and opened Meiji University Museum. The university announced on February 26, 2009, that it would open a museum dedicated to anime and manga. It will include international research centers hosting Japanese and international scholars as well as a large quality of artifacts on the subject.

== Academic rankings ==
University rankings
Global
QS	General	1201-1400

Regional
QS Asia (Asia version)	General	301-350

National

Program rankings
Social Sciences & Humanities

LAW

Natural Sciences & Technology

Meiji University has achieved worldwide recognition in various international publications focusing on higher education.

=== General rankings ===
The university has been ranked 19th and 26th in 2009 and 2010 respectively in the ranking "Truly Strong Universities" by Toyo Keizai. The QS World University Rankings ranked the university 354th in Asia in 2025.

=== Research performance ===
The Nikkei Shimbun on 16 February 2004 surveyed about the research standards in engineering studies based on Thomson Reuters, Grants in Aid for Scientific Research and questionnaires to heads of 93 leading Japanese Research Centers, and Meiji was placed 37th in this ranking.

Meiji has filed the 62nd highest number of patents in the nation as its research outcomes.

=== Graduate school rankings ===
Meiji Law School is considered one of the top Japanese law schools, as Meiji's number of successful candidates for Japanese bar examination has been 14th and 20th in 2009 and 2010 respectively. It is one of the strongest department in this university as the cumulative number of people qualified as lawyer and prosecutor has been historically sixth after WW2.

Eduniversal ranked Meiji as fourth in the rankings of "Excellent Business Schools nationally strong and/or with continental links" in Japan.

=== Alumni rankings ===
According to the Weekly Economist's 2010 rankings, graduates from Meiji University have the 35th best employment rate in 400 major companies

The university is also ranked sixth in Japan for the number of alumni holding the position of executive in the listed companies of Japan, and this number per student (probability of becoming an executive) is 25th.

Meiji graduates have been ranked fifth in Japan in the number of successful national CPA exam applicants. Its graduates have been also ranked ninth in Japan in the number of successful Architect Registration exam applicants.

Furthermore, the number of Members of Parliament who graduated Meiji is sixth in Japan.

=== Popularity and selectivity ===
The number of applicants per place was 24.9 (113,905/4,582) in the 2011 undergraduate admissions, this number of applicants (113,905) was largest in 2011. Its entrance difficulty is also very selective.

Meiji university is regarded as comparable with the Tokyo-area private universities Aoyama Gakuin, Rikkyo, Chuo, and Hosei, collectively called "MARCH".

== Alumni ==
Meiji University's alumni have included: Japan's first female lawyer, 2 Japanese prime ministers, 48 national politicians, 380 professional athletes, 115 company presidents, and 264 artists.

=== Politics ===
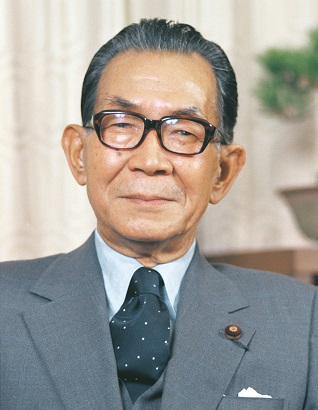
Former (1974–1976) Japanese prime minister Takeo Miki

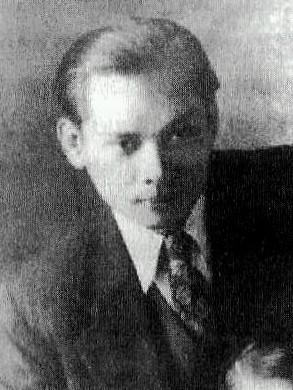
Madjid Usman

==== World leaders ====
- The 66th Japanese Prime Minister Takeo Miki (1974–1976)
- The 81st Japanese Prime Minister Tomiichi Murayama (1994–1996)

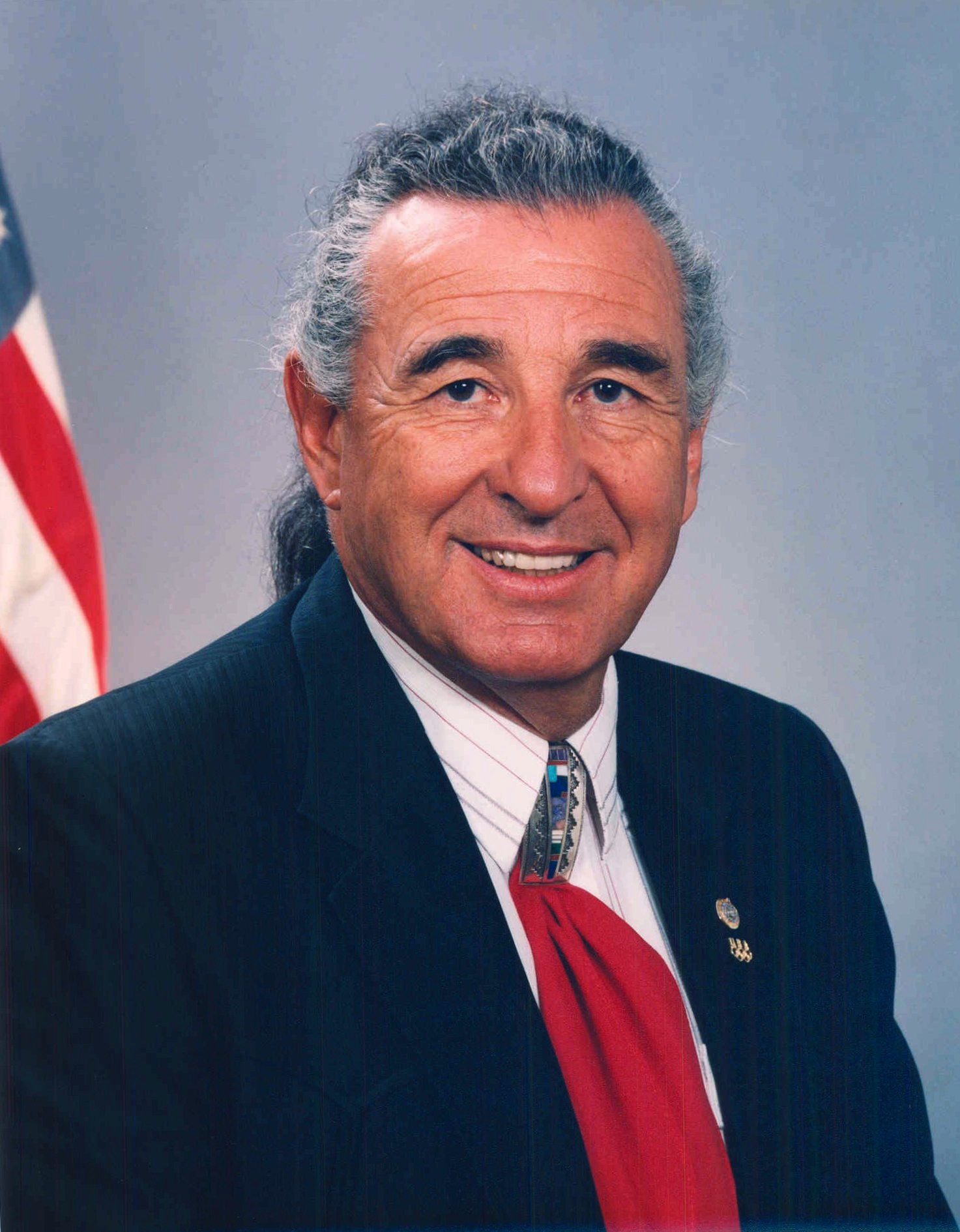
US Senator Ben Nighthorse Campbell

==== Other politicians ====
- Gibril Ibrahim (Minister of Finance and Economic Planning) in the republic of Sudan.
- Xie Jieshi (Manchu Empire Foreign Minister)
- Hasegawa Nyozekan
- Abdoel Madjid Usman (Indonesian revolutionary, first Indonesian to study in Japan)
- Yōsuke Matsuoka (Minister for Foreign Affairs)
- Ichio Asukata (chairman of the Japan Socialist Party)
- Takashi Sasagawa (Minister)
- Ken Harada (Minister of Economic Planning)
- Masayuki Fujio (Minister of Education)
- Hiromichi Watanabe
- Yoshitaka Sakurada
- Fumiaki Matsumoto
- Ritsuo Hosokawa (Minister of Health, Labour and Welfare)
- Yoshitaka Shindo (Minister of Internal Affairs and Communications)
- Satoshi Takayama
- Shigeo Kitamura
- Yoshio Urushibara
- Koichi Tani
- Masaji Matsuyama
- Masaaki Akaike
- Naoki Inose (Governor of Tokyo, journalist)
- Ben Nighthorse Campbell, US Senator

=== Others ===
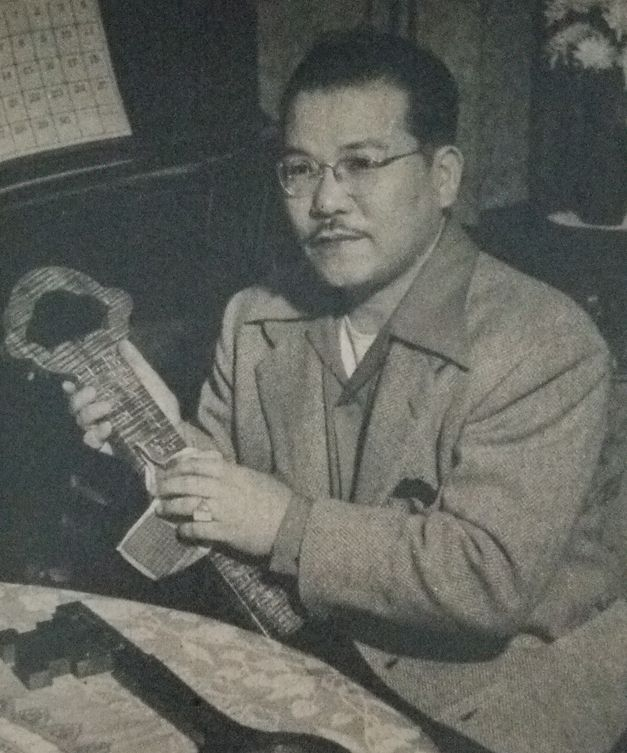
Masao Koga

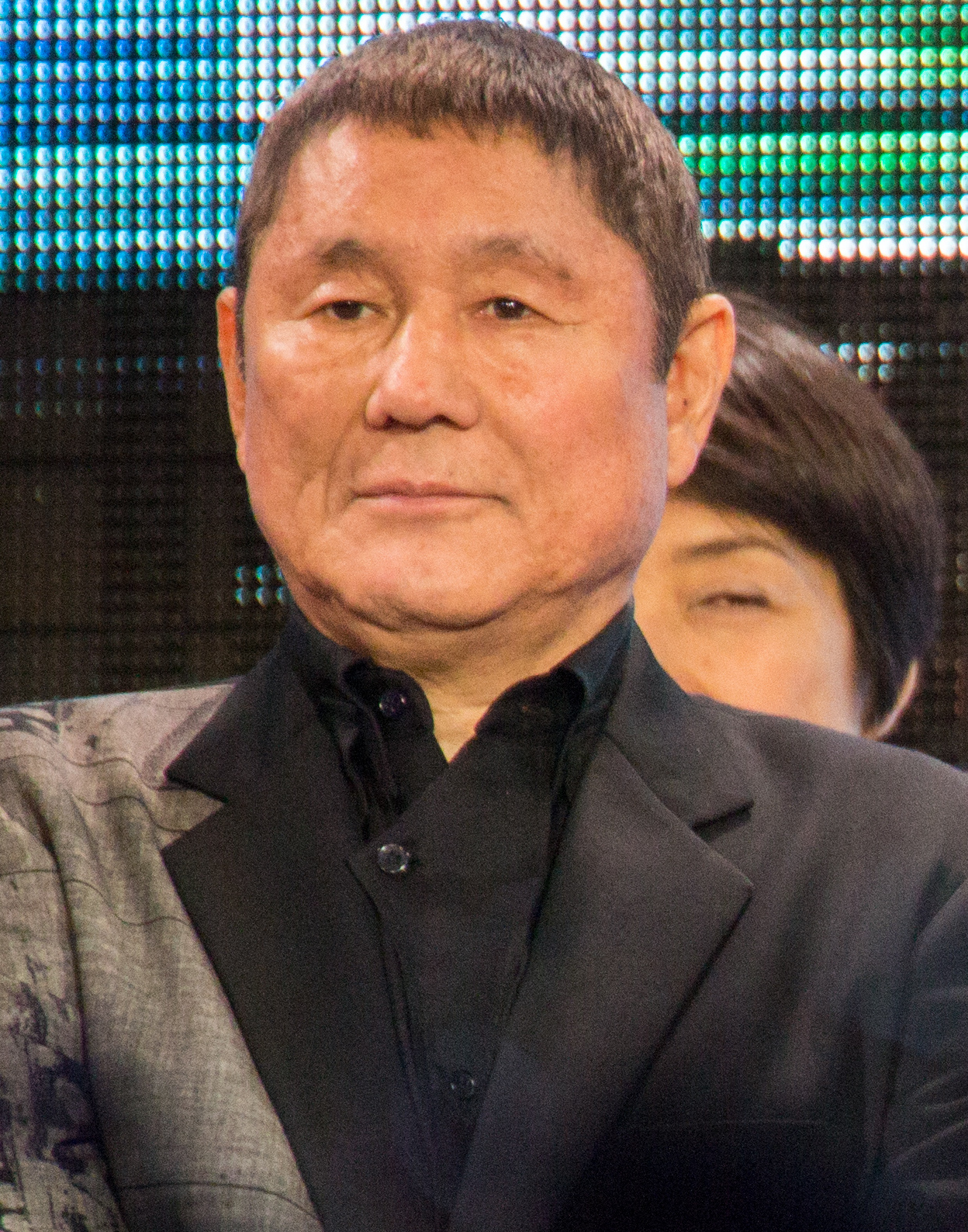
Takeshi Kitano

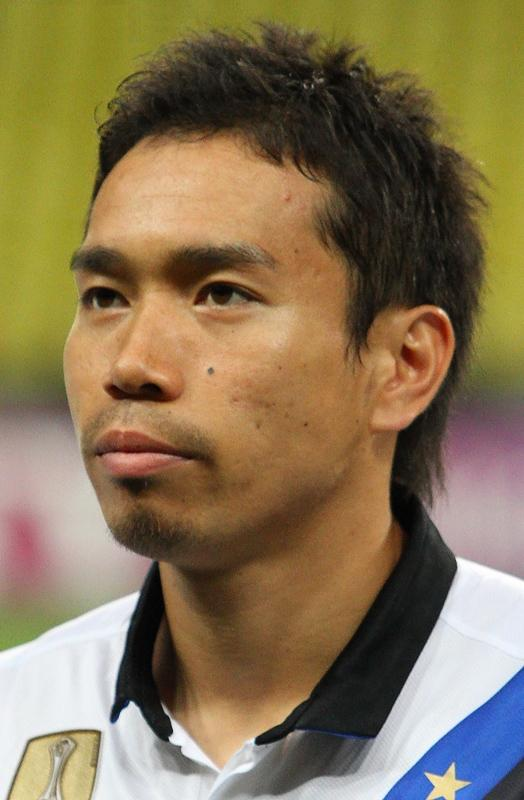
Yuto Nagatomo

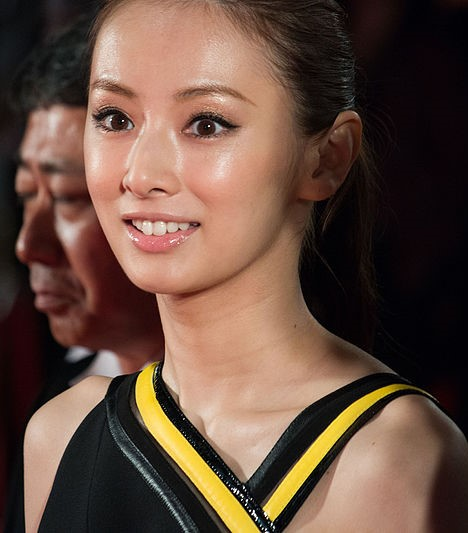
Keiko Kitagawa

- Yū Aku (lyricist, poet, and novelist)
- Seiya Ando (basketball player)
- Hideki Arai (manga artist)
- Morio Agata (singer)
- Nahomi Edamoto (culinary expert)
- Yuta Fujihara (professional football player)
- Tatsuji Fuse (Korean independence movement custodian)
- Hideo Gosha (film director)
- Koji Hashimoto (professional football player)
- Masaaki Hatsumi (martial artist, founder of Bujinkan)
- Tiger Hattori (professional wrestling referee, New Japan Pro-Wrestling)
- Syu Hiraide (novelist, lawyer)
- Takafumi Hori (football manager)
- Senichi Hoshino (baseball player, manager)
- Kei Inoo (member of Hey! Say! JUMP, idol, actor, singer)
- Mao Inoue (actress)
- Sogo Ishii
- Kensuke Isidu (fashion designer)
- Sachio Ito (novelist)
- Kaiji Kawaguchi (manga artist)
- Yuzo Kawashima (film director)
- Kan Kikuchi (novelist)
- Keiko Kitagawa (actress)
- Yuki Kobayashi (professional football player)
- Ryuki Miura (professional football player)
- Mayumi Mizuno (announcer)
- Masaru Kitano (doctor of engineering and TV commentator)
- Takeshi Kitano (film director)
- Daichi Kiyono (actor, rugby player)
- Akira Kobayashi (film actor)
- Yasuo Kobayashi (aikido instructor)
- Masao Koga (composer)
- Masato Koizumi (Preacher)
- Shigeaki Kosugi (freelance broadcaster/actor)
- Keiichiro Koyama (actor, singer (J-pop group NEWS), former MC (Shounen Club)
- Kazufumi Miyazawa (composer, singer)
- Showtaro Morikubo (voice actor, actor, singer)
- Osamu Mukai (actor)
- Yuto Nagatomo (professional football player)
- Toshiyuki Nishida (film actor)
- Tomoso Nonaka (novelist and illustrator)
- Hiroshi Ohshita (Professional Baseball Player, Hall of famer)
- Yoshiaki Oiwa (Equestrian Eventing Rider)
- Kihachi Okamoto (film director)
- Ren Osugi (film actor)
- Toshio Sakai (photographer)
- Motoi Sakuraba (composer, musician)
- Kazuhiro Sano (film director and actor)
- Kiyoshi Sasabe (film director)
- Mamoru Sasaki (screenwriter)
- Norio Sasaki (soccer manager)
- Kentaro Seki (professional soccer player)
- Fusako Shigenobu (activist)
- Tetsuo Shinohara (film director)
- Sohn Kee-chung (marathon runner)
- Kokichi Sugihara (mathematician and artist)
- Denmei Suzuki (film actor)
- Shigeyoshi Suzuki (film director)
- Yuzo Takada (manga artist)
- Ken Takakura (film actor)
- Buyūzan Takeyoshi (sumo wrestler)
- Noboru Tanaka (film director)
- Kenichiro Teratsuji (KENCHI) (dancer and actor)
- Eijirō Tōno (film actor)
- Keigo Tsunemoto (professional soccer player)
- Ryoichi Uchimura (Keishicho, Kendo player, 2-time All Japan winner)
- Naomi Uemura (mountain climber, adventurer)
- Moriteru Ueshiba (Third Aikido Doshu)
- Wataru Watari (novelist)
- Koji Yamamoto (basketball player)
- Mizuki Yamamoto (model, actress)
- Tatsuro Yamashita (composer, singer)
- Tomohisa Yamashita (actor, singer)
- Yoshihiro Yonezawa
- Tom Yoda (Business Administration Graduate), current councilor of the university and ex-chairman of Avex Group
- Kenjirou Tsuda (actor, voice actor)
- Shingo Fujimori (Oriental Radio/Comedian)
- Chicara Jericho (voice actress)
- Shogo Hama (actor)
- Wakaba Higuchi (figure skater)
- Shun Sato (figure skater)

== Sister Universities ==
- National Formosa University, Yunlin, Taiwan
