= Aotea Lagoon =

Urban park in Porirua, New Zealand

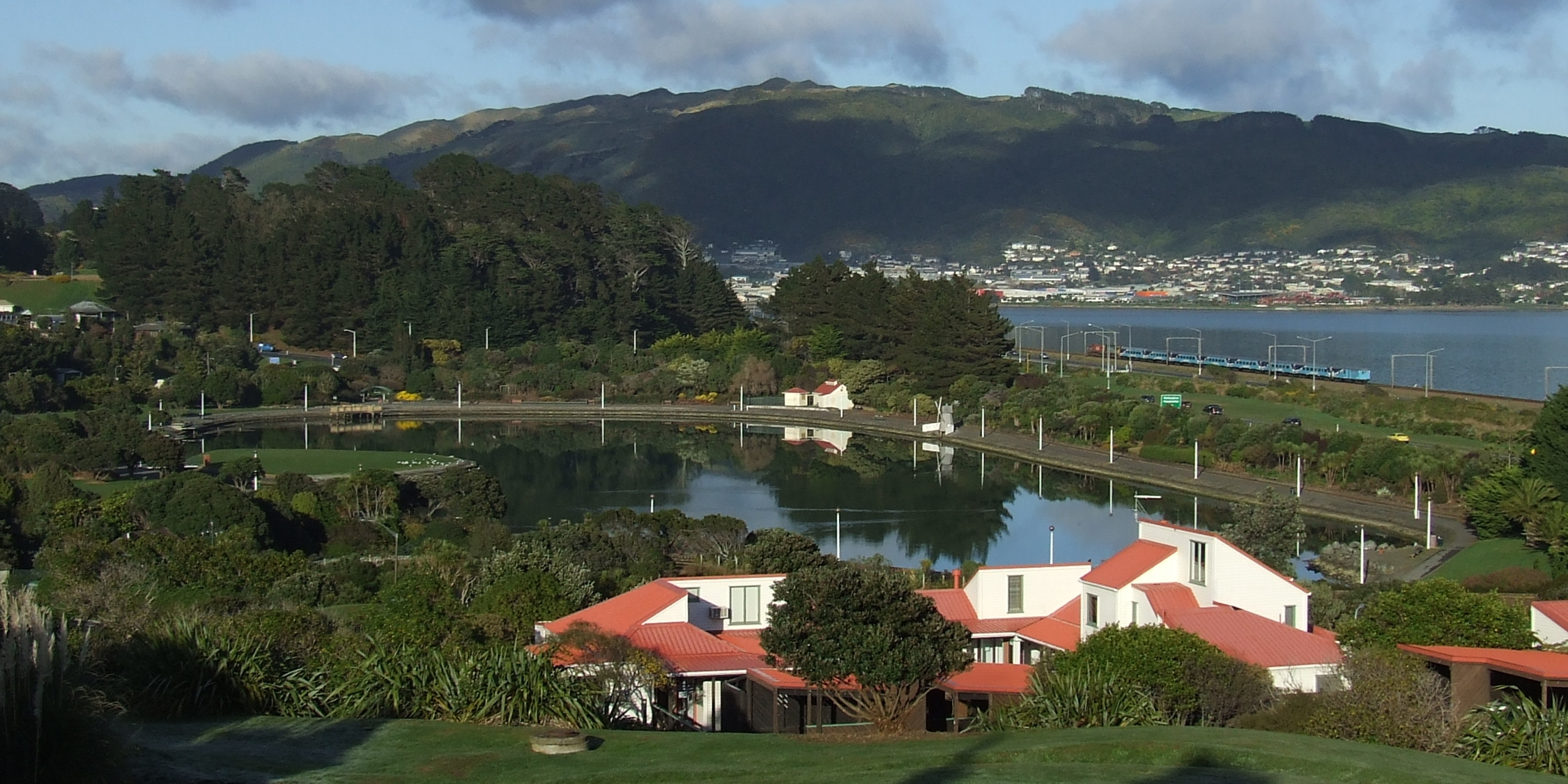
- Aotea Lagoon from the north-east in 2007
- Interactive map of Aotea Lagoon
- Type: Urban park
- Location: Porirua, Wellington, New Zealand
- Coordinates: 41°7′10.9446″S 174°51′25.1598″E
- Area: 7 ha (17 acres)
- Opened: 22 March 1980
- Manager: Porirua City Council
- Open: All year
- Water: 5 ha (12 acres) artificial saltwater lagoon
- Public transit: Metlink bus 236 stop on Papakōwhai Road at the Royal New Zealand Police College
- Website: poriruacity.govt.nz/discover-porirua/parks-and-reserves/aotea-lagoon/

Aotea Lagoon is an urban park, containing an artificial salt water lagoon, in Porirua, New Zealand.

The lagoon was originally a bay on the Onepoto arm of Te Awarua-o-Porirua Harbour. The bay was in Papakōwhai between promontories at Gear Homestead and Thurso Grove. The North Island Main Trunk railway line passes through the area. It originally followed the curve of the bay's shoreline. By 1960 the railway line had been moved to a causeway built straight across the bay by the Ministry of Works. Largely cut off from the sea, the bay became a lagoon.

By the early 1970s the ministry had to provide a recreational reserve for the state housing it had built in the city. The ministry, Porirua City Council and local service clubs developed a park around the lagoon. The park opened in 1980, and the Crown gave it to the council in 1994.

Aotea Lagoon has zones for various types of recreation. The central zone has a path around the lagoon for exercising, but swimming in the lagoon is banned due to poor water quality. The northern end is the play zone with playgrounds, a splash pad and barbeques. The southern end is the garden zone, and all three zones also have lawns. A rideable miniature train runs around the park on Sunday afternoons, weather permitting. On Aotea Lagoon's official website, the council describe it as one of the city's flagship parks.

== Geography ==
The park covers 7 ha (17 acres). It is bounded by three roads. To the east and south is Papakōwhai Road, which was State Highway 1 until the late 1970s. To the west and north is State Highway 59, which was State Highway 1 until 2021. They are connected by Whitford Brown Avenue in the south-west corner.

=== Hydrology ===
The lagoon covers 5 ha (12 acres). On the seaward side a culvert connects the lagoon to the Onepoto arm of Porirua Harbour, which was renamed Te Awarua-o-Porirua Harbour in 2014. The lagoon end of the culvert is below a model windmill, and the tide is regulated by gates. The windmill houses controls for the gates, and it was presented to the city by Paremata Jaycee in 1981.

On the landward side the lagoon originally trapped silt from earthworks on the slopes above as the Ministry of Works built Whitford Brown Avenue and the Royal New Zealand Police College. Nowadays three stormwater drains empty into the lagoon. There used to be a duck pond, which emptied into the lagoon, where the ducks contributed to very poor water quality. In the early 2020s it was filled in, and an artificial stream was built in its place.

A report on the Te Awarua-o-Porirua catchment published in 2015 said the lagoon was "... a heavily polluted, artificial saltwater lagoon ...". Limited flushing of the water in the lagoon has led to poor water quality and a ban on swimming.

=== Geology ===
Te Awarua-o-Porirua Harbour has a base of greywacke rock sitting on the Pacific tectonic plate. It consists of the Pāuatahanui and Onepoto arms, which formed around 8,000 years ago when the sea level rose and flooded two river valleys. As the Pacific plate sinks under the Australian plate, earthquakes are a hazard in the area. There are three active fault lines, one of which runs the length of the Onepoto arm past Aotea Lagoon.

The soils around the lagoon are mainly composed of weathered greywacke loess. The coast was Porirua silt loam, but Paremata hill soils cut from the slopes above were used to partly fill in the lagoon and landscape the park.

== History ==
Between Porirua city centre and Paremata, State Highway 1 and the single-track North Island Main Trunk railway line used to run around three bays. From south to north, the bays were between the mouth of Porirua Stream, Gear Homestead, Thurso Grove and Brora Crescent. (Note: Taken in 1944 the bay that will become Aotea Lagoon is centre left. The two-lane State Highway 1 runs along the coast. To the right is the single-track North Island Main Trunk railway line. Gear Homestead and the northern end of what will become Okowai lagoon are top centre. The southern end of what will become Papakōwhai lagoon is bottom left. The railway line was built by the Wellington and Manawatu Railway Company (WMR). The Porirua to Paremata section was opened on 24 September 1885. In 1908, the government bought the WMR and added it to New Zealand Railways.) The Ministry of Works built a causeway across the bays to add a second railway track and straighten the line. The project was completed in November 1960. Largely isolated from the sea, the bays became lagoons. (Note: Taken in 1969 Aotea Lagoon is top centre. Papakōwhai lagoon is to the left, Gear Homestead to the right and Okowai lagoon further right. The double-track North Island Main Trunk railway line is on the causeway.) In the 1970s the ministry widened the causeway, by partly filling in the lagoons, to straighten the state highway. (Note: Taken in 1971 Aotea Lagoon is centre left. The causeway is being widened. Gear Homestead and part of Okowai Lagoon are above.) (Note: Taken in 1979 Aotea Lagoon is bottom centre. State Highway 1 is on the causeway above the lagoon. Its former route, below the lagoon, is Papakōwhai Road. Whitford Brown Avenue, left of the lagoon, connects the other two roads.)

Having built state housing in the city, the ministry had to provide a recreational reserve. In November 1973 the ministry offered Porirua City Council two options for the central lagoon. It could either be filled in for playing fields or a park could be developed around it. In August 1975 the council chose the park.

The Ministry of Works and Development, formed in 1974, did the earthworks. All the existing vegetation was removed so the park initially had "... a barren, raw character ...", according to the council's management plan published in 1994. Jobseekers on government employment programmes did much of the landscaping. The city's service clubs developed features, while the council coordinated the project.

Aotea Lagoon was officially opened on 22 March 1980 by Porirua City mayor Whitford Brown. Originally leased from the Crown, the park was given to the council in 1994.

== Features ==
The park has three zones: lagoon, play and garden. As of 2025 the first zone has a 732 m (2,402 ft) path around the lagoon, a fitness station, a pétanque court and a bridge to an island. To the north-east, the play zone has adventure and toddlers's playgrounds, a memorial walkway for children, barbecues, the stream, a pump track, and the splash pad. To the south-west, the garden zone has a sculpture by Guy Ngan, commissioned by Porirua Rotary, and the Rotary boardwalk through native wetland planting. All three zones also have lawns.

The rideable miniature train runs around the park on an 832 m (2,730 ft) track, which includes a tunnel. The railway operates Sunday afternoons, weather permitting, from a station south-west of the lagoon. Developed by Waitangirua Lions, the railway was one of the original features when the park opened in 1980.

Aotea Lagoon's former features, all but one original according to an aerial photograph taken four months before the park opened, (Note: Taken in November 1979 four months before the park officially opened, Aotea Lagoon is bottom centre. On the left, the garden zone contains the circular Rotary rose garden and the pond. Right of the rose garden is the miniature railway station. Right and below the pond is the jetty. Further right and below are the pétanque court, the island and the duck pond. See also the map of the park from 2009, which labels most of the features.) are:

- a pond with a bridge in the garden zone lawn (1980 – c. 2020)
- a jetty opposite the main entrance to the garden zone (1980 – c. 2020) (Note: Taken in 2016. To zoom into the aerial photographs on the LINZ Data Service: click on the map and hold, move the pointer, release then zoom in with the + key.) (Note: Taken in 2020 the garden zone pond and the jetty have been removed.)
- the duck pond (1980 – c. 2023)
- a rose garden in the garden zone (1980 – c. 2025) developed by Porirua Rotary with Ngan's sculpture as its original centrepiece
- a shade house or fernery next to the rose garden (c. 1982 – c. 2017) (Note: Taken in 1982 Aotea Lagoon is top left. The shade house is next to the rose garden on the right. The model windmill is left of the rose garden. The multi-lane State Highway 1 is below the lagoon.) (Note: Taken in summer 2016–17 the shade house has been removed.)

A row boat concession also operated at the lagoon (c. 1984 – 1989).

== Wildlife ==
Birds seen at the park include black-backed gulls, white-faced heron and a variety of waterfowl. The lagoon's small fish include inanga, spotties and sprats. Larger fish, seen less frequently, include mullet, kahawais, stingrays and eels.

In the early 2020s the duck pond was replaced by the artificial stream. Despite very poor water quality, over 500 fish were moved from the pond to local streams, including inanga and 25 New Zealand longfin eels. Heron and shags have been seen at the stream.

== Visitor surveys ==
Porirua City Council surveyed visitors to Aotea Lagoon in 1994 and 2009. The first survey was taken shortly after the council began managing the park. The second was taken partly to inform redevelopment of the adventure playground, which was added in the mid-1980s.

The 2009 survey found that most visitors came to walk, for relaxation or exercise, and they lived nearby in Porirua or neighbouring Tawa. However, the playground drew visitors from a wider area including Wellington and the Hutt Valley.

By summer 2012–13 the adventure playground had been redeveloped and a toddlers's playground added. (Note: Taken in 1995 Aotea Lagoon is top centre. The original adventure playground is below the duck pond, which is left of the lagoon.) (Note: Taken in summer 2012–13. The playgrounds are to the right of the top end of the lagoon, just above the duck pond. The adventure playground has been redeveloped and a toddlers's playground added.)

== Transport ==
Aotea Lagoon is on Metlink bus route 236, which stops at the main gate on Papakōwhai Road opposite the Royal New Zealand Police College. The nearest railway station is Paremata on the Kāpiti Line. There is parking for cars on Papakōwhai Road along the length of Aotea Lagoon.

== Gallery ==
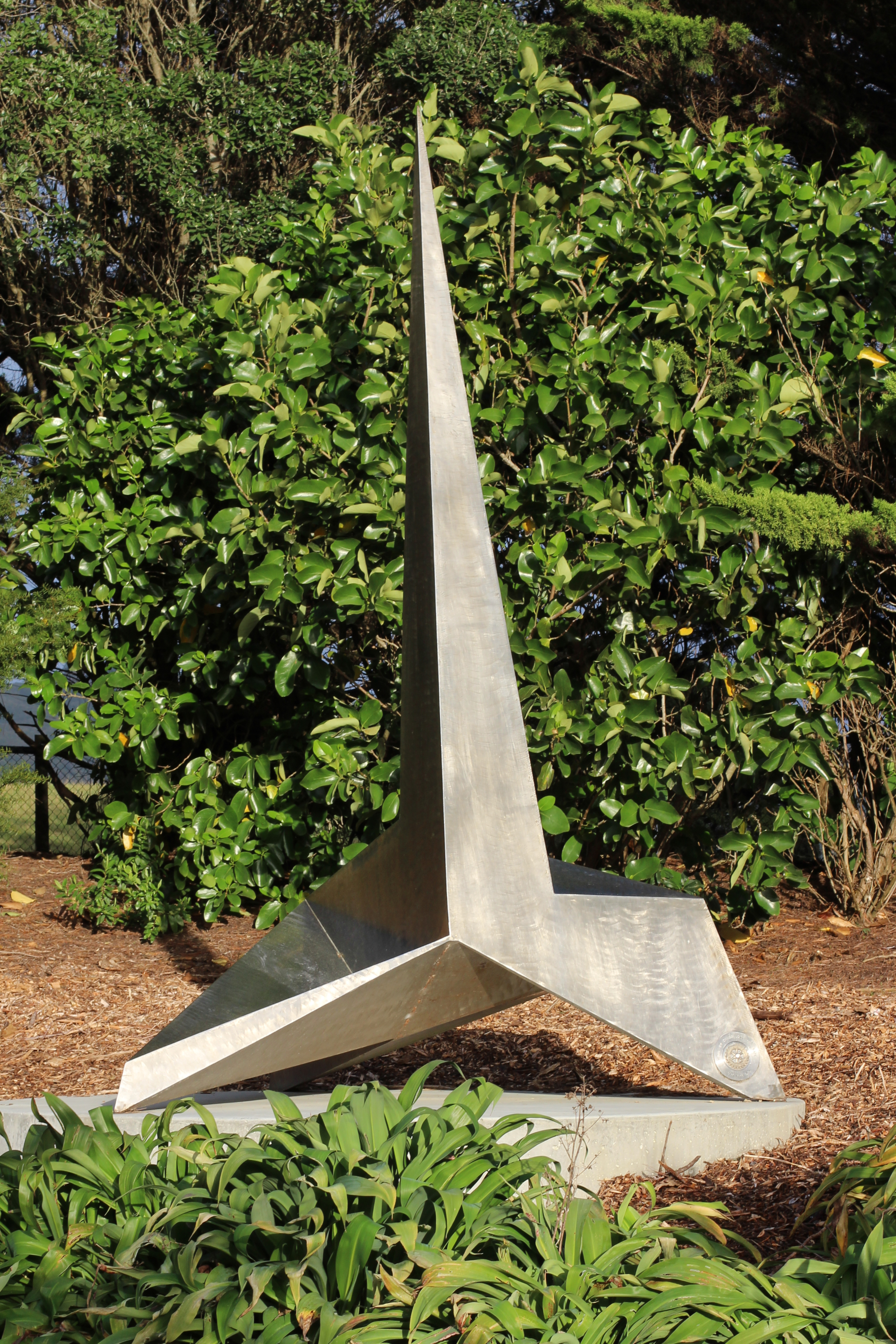
Guy Ngan, Untitled [Aotea Lagoon] (1979) in 2025.

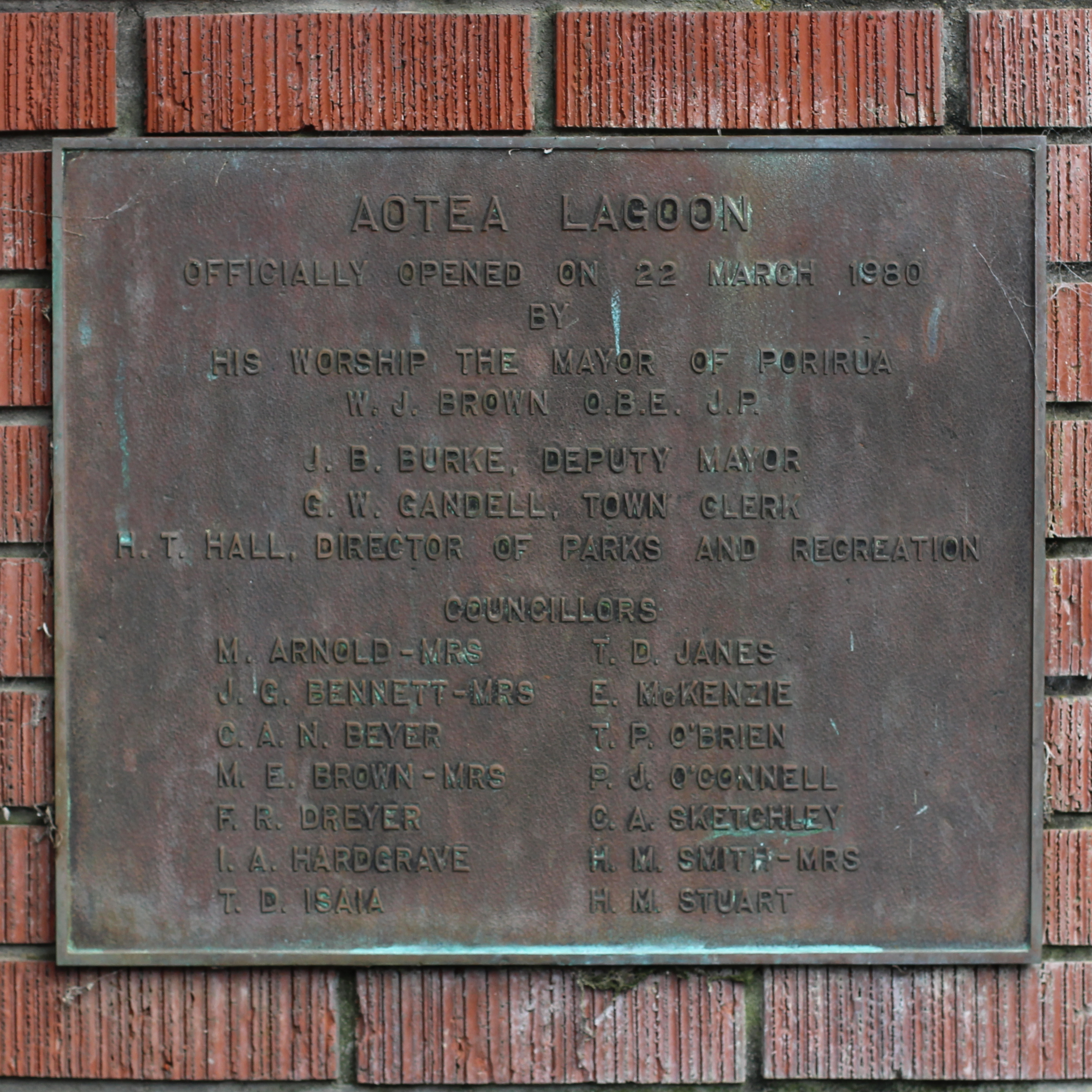
Commemorative plaque for the opening of Aotea Lagoon at the main gate in 2025.

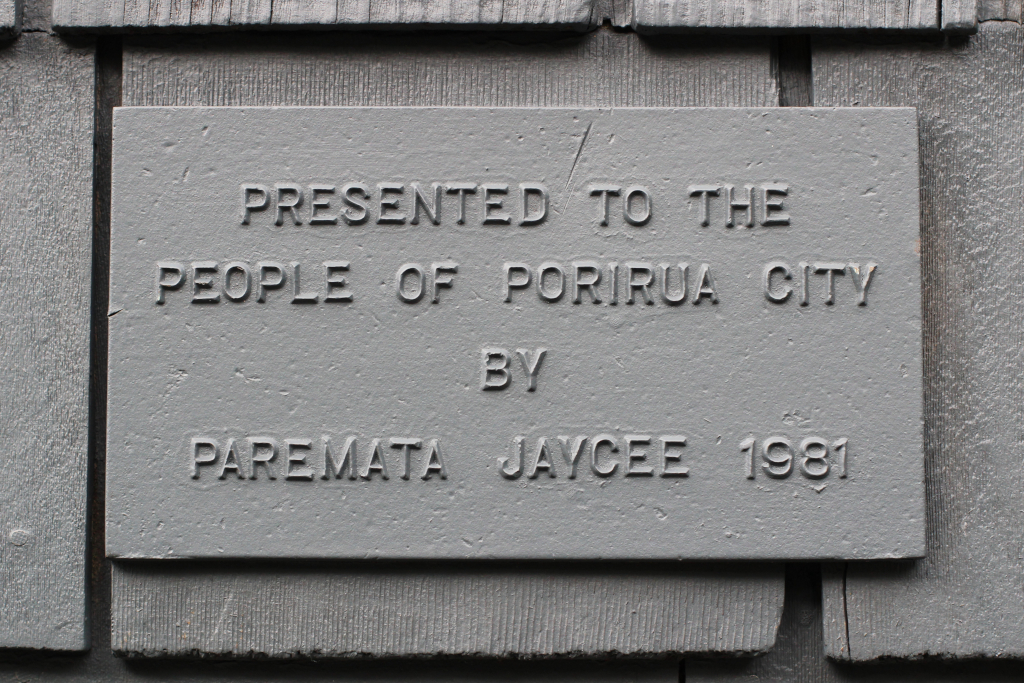
Commemorative plaque on the model windmill in 2025.
