= Tomoso Nonaka =

Japanese novelist and illustrator

- Born: tokyo
- Education: Meiji University
- Occupation: writer

Tomoso Nonaka (Japanese:野中ともそ) is a Japanese novelist and illustrator.

== Early life and education ==
Nonaka was born in Tokyo, Japan. She graduated from Meiji University's Faculty of Letters, Department of Drama. While at university, she belonged to a music circle and devoted herself to band activities.

== Career ==
She went to New York in 1992 after working as a music writer in Tokyo for several years. She is the author and illustrator of over 15 publications, including novels, illustrated essays, and children's book translations.

Her debut novel was honoured with the Shueisha New Writer of Literature Award. In 2007, she was a finalist for the Tshubota Joji Literature Award for Young Readers, as well as the 54th Shogakukan Children's Culture Publishing Award.

== Novels ==
- Bread's Ringing Sea Scarlet Sky (1999)
- Flagler's Maritime Railway (2002)
- The brightest roof in the universe (2003)
- Katyusha (2005)
- Reggae Bar at the End of the World (2005)
- Landing goldfish (2007)
- Cherry (2007)
- The nape of a dog (2009)
- Pishan-chan (2009)
- Duck Flight Presley (2011)
- Aminaya Band Goes to the Sky (2012)
- Wife's Wife (2014)
- Rainbow Nest (2016)
- Laundry shop Jujiro (2018)
- Under the distant sky, we speak fearfully (2023)
