= Police Museum (Tampere) =

Museum in Finland

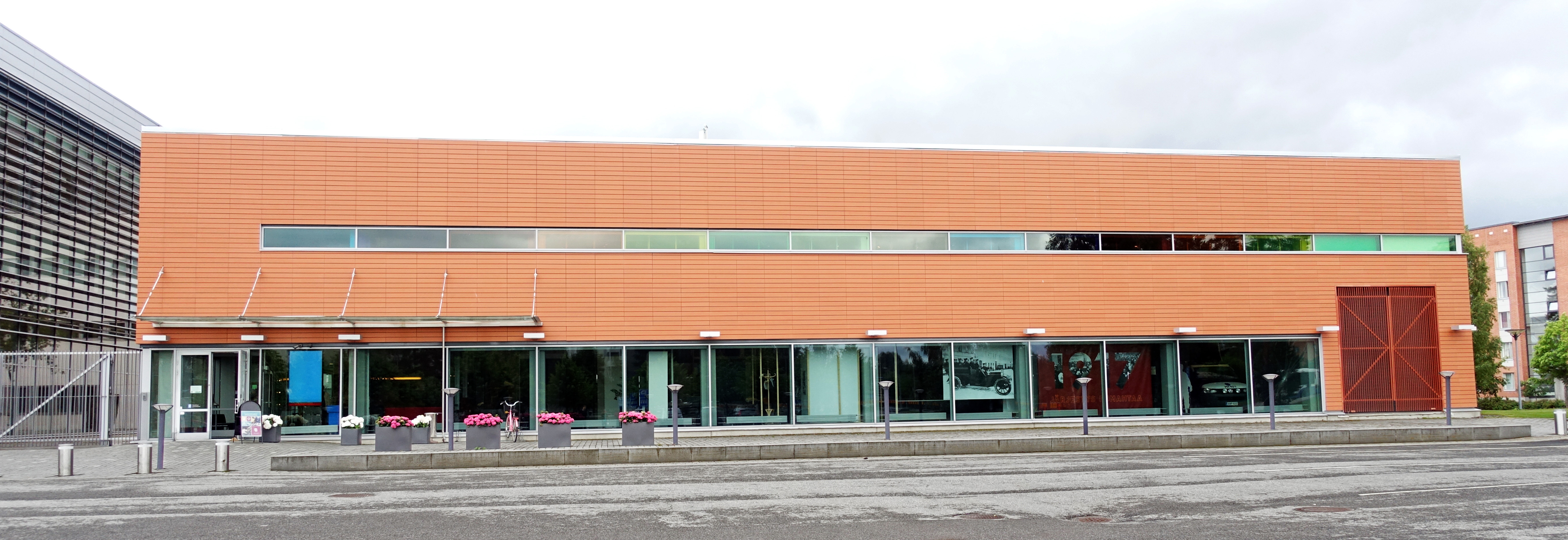
- Established: 2004; 22 years ago
- Location: Police University College, Tampere, Finland
- Coordinates: 61°27′11″N 23°51′07″E
- Type: Police museum
- Website: poliisimuseo.fi

The Police Museum (Finnish: Poliisimuseo) is a museum showcasing the history of the Finnish police in Hervanta, Tampere. It is located on the Police University College campus and was established in 2004. In 2008, it was relocated to its own facilities and opened to the public. Admission to the museum is free.

In 2019, the Crime Museum operated by the National Bureau of Investigation in Vantaa was merged with the Police Museum, combining their collections. The Crime Museum is not open to the public and is used as a teaching exhibition for police officers, but some of its items are used in the Police Museum's exhibitions.

In 2022, the Police Museum was awarded the Museum of the Year Award by the Finnish Museums Association and the International Council of Museums.

== Exhibitions ==
The Police Museum's permanent exhibition "Police Present!" (Poliisi Paikalla!) displays the history of law enforcement in Finland from the middle ages to present day, as well as general duties of the police, the relationship between the police and the public, and notable criminal cases.

In addition to the permanent exhibition, the museum hosts temporary exhibitions which display different aspects of police work in more depth. These temporary exhibitions remain on display for 2–3 years. Until the late 2027, the temporary exhibitions are Art Crime Cases and Maijas and Mörkös. Art Crime Cases displays historic instances of art forgery, and Maijas and Mörkös showcases the history of various vehicles used by the police.

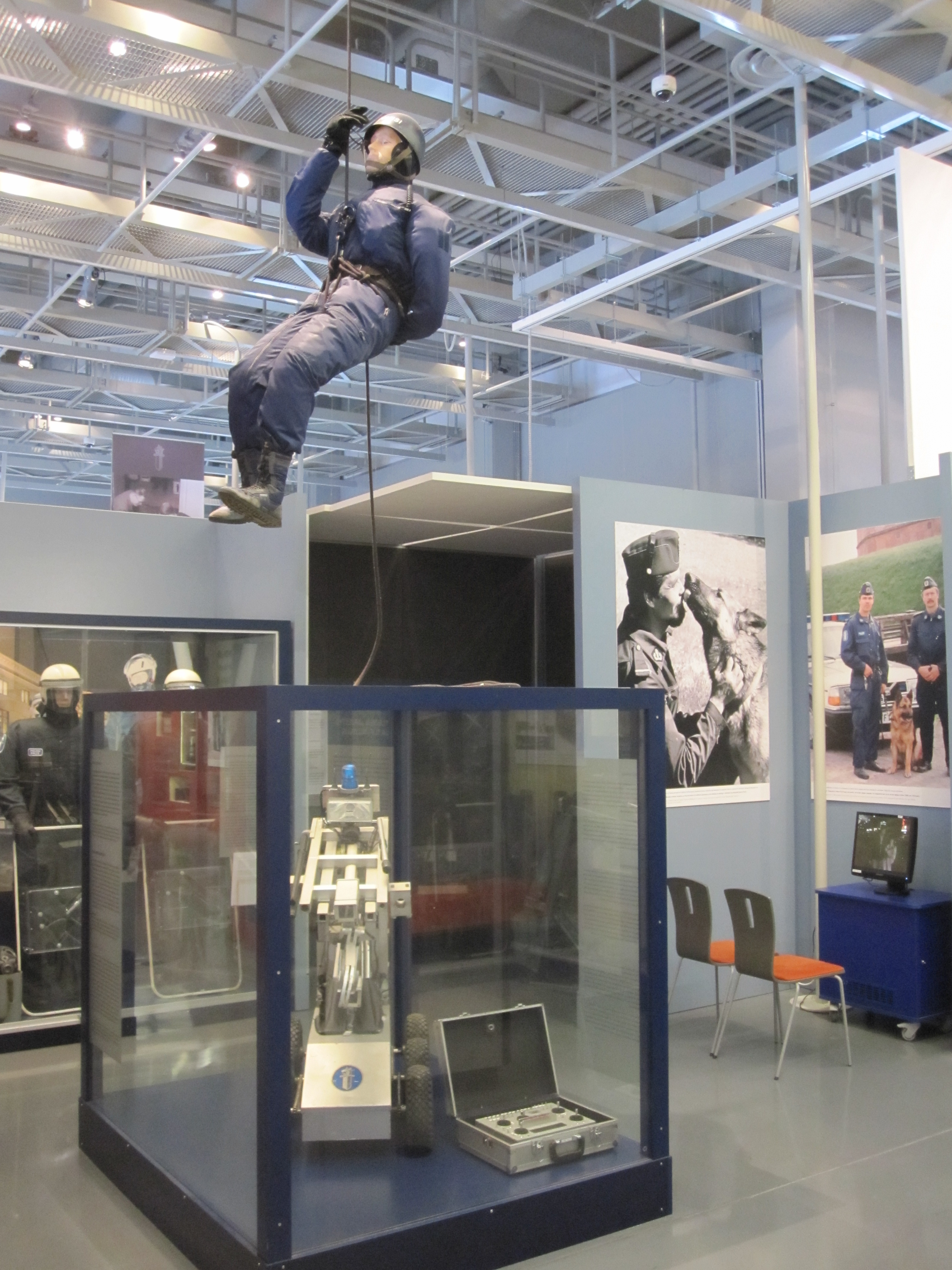
Temporary exhibition 900 Years of Police History in Finland in 2012

Previous temporary exhibitions include:

- The Colored Truth Art – Crime in Finland
- Public Order Collapses 1917 – When Hatred Became a Virtue and Revenge a Merit
- Formally Qualified – A Century of Finnish Police Education
- Demanding Situations and the Use of Force
- Police in Fiction
- From Okhrana to Supo – State Security Police in Finland
- 80 Years' History of the National Traffic Police
- Photographic Exhibition on Forensic Criminal Investigation – Photographs from Tampere from the 1920s to the 1950s
- The Nose Knows – A Century of Finnish Police Dogs
- Images of the Police – Some Views
- 900 Years of Police History in Finland
- FINPOL 05 – divided into 75 Years of Safety for Citizens, From the Depot to the Technology Centre and In Search of Crime

The museum can also be visited virtually and has several online exhibitions.

== Collections ==
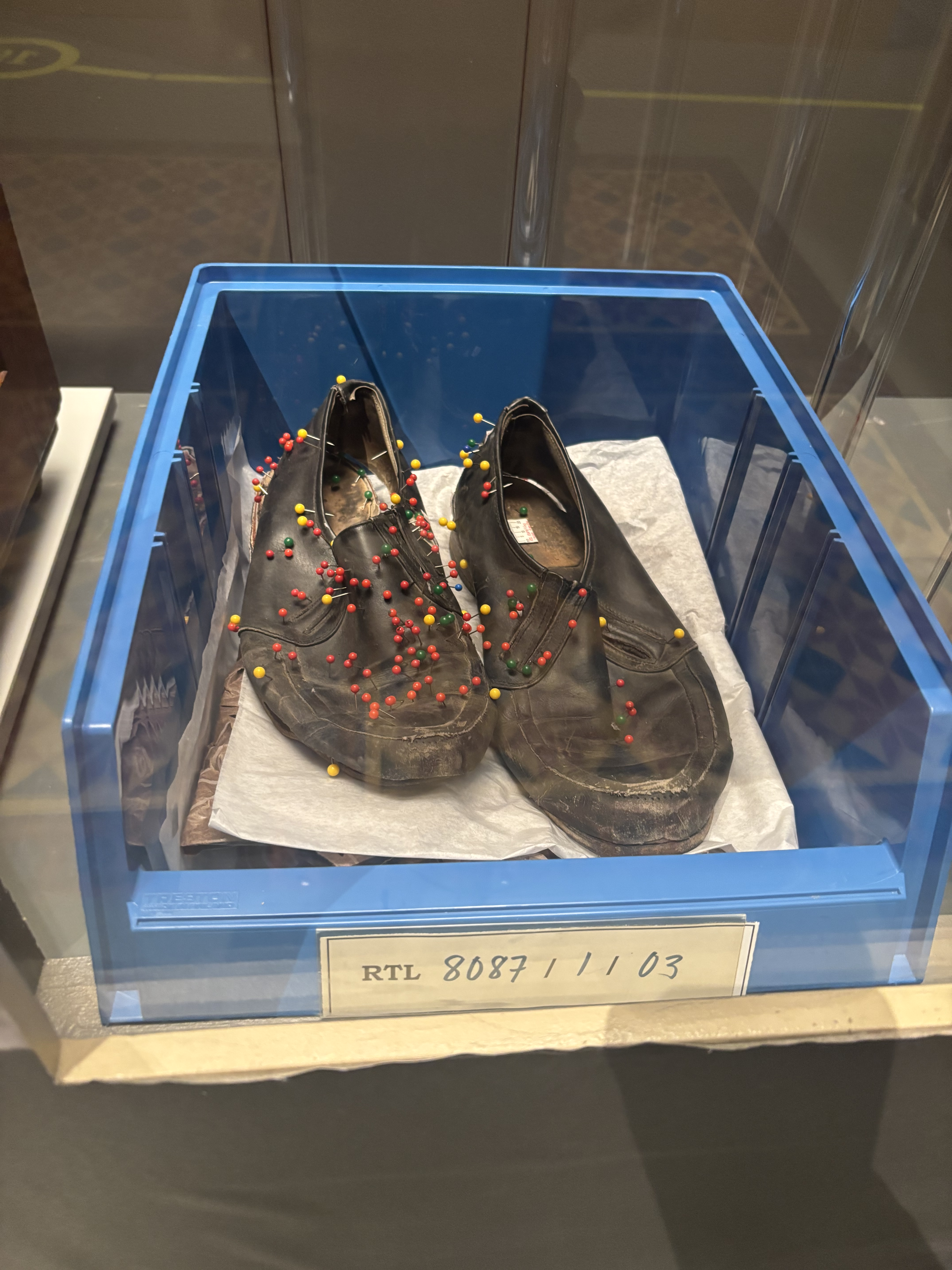
A pair of shoes held as evidence by the Police Museum belonging to a suspect of the Lake Bodom murders

The Police Museum's wider archive collects and documents material related to the history and operations of the police nationwide. The Police Museum's collection includes approximately 24,000 objects, 142,000 photographs, 2,500 books, and 4,000 films or multimedia presentations, only a fraction of which are on display to the public.

The majority of the collections have been donated either by private persons or by different police departments and groups, such as the Finnish Security and Intelligence Service.
