= Vienna Crime Museum =

Crime museum in Vienna, Austria

Coordinates: 48°13′06″N 16°22′43″E

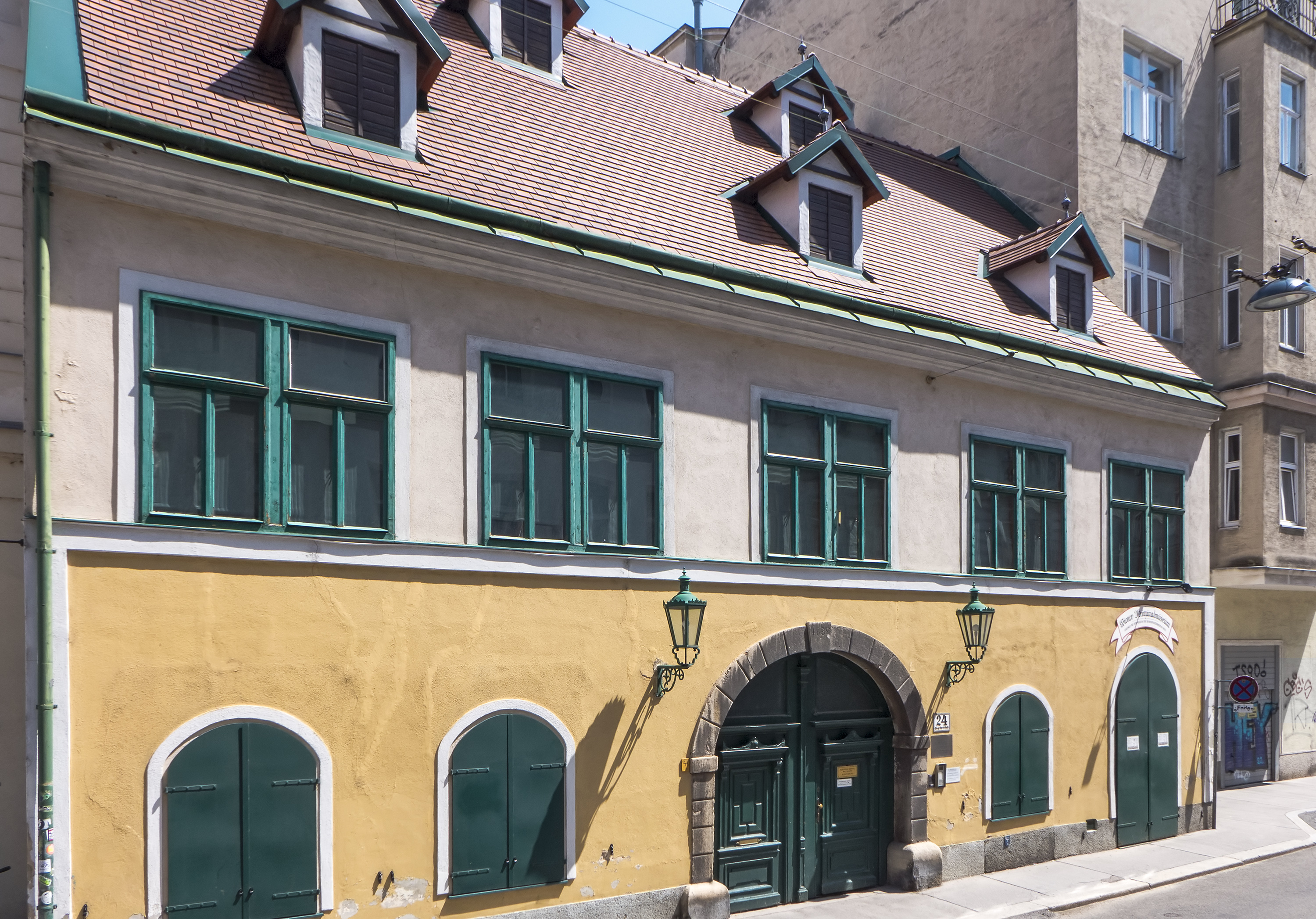
View of the museum building

The Vienna Crime Museum (German: Wiener Kriminalmuseum) is a crime museum in Vienna, Austria.

The museum is located in the Seifensiederhaus at 24 Großen Sperlgasse, one of the oldest buildings in Leopoldstadt, the city's second district. It originated as the Imperial and Royal Police Museum (k.k. Polizeimuseums) in 1899, which then became the Crime and Police Museum of the Viennese Federal Police Directorate (Kriminalpolizeilichen Museum der Bundespolizeidirektion Wien) from 1984 to 1991.
