= Royal New Zealand Police College =

Police academy in New Zealand

Coordinates: 41.120428°S 174.860236°E

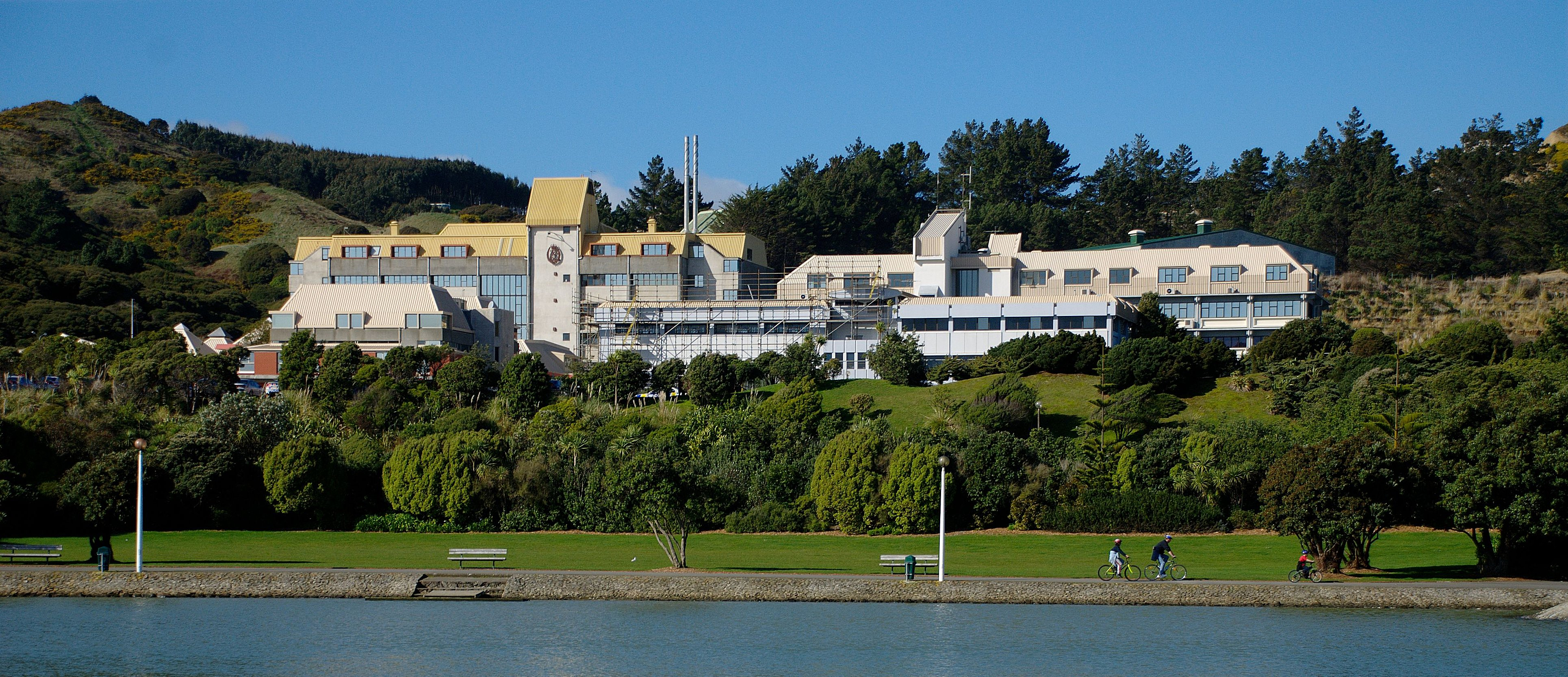
- The Royal New Zealand Police College viewed from Aotea Lagoon
- Established: 1981
- Location: Papakōwhai, Porirua, Wellington Region, New Zealand
- Website: RNZPC

The Royal New Zealand Police College (RNZPC) is the central training institution for police recruits and police officers in New Zealand. It is located at Papakowhai, approximately 2 km north of Porirua City.

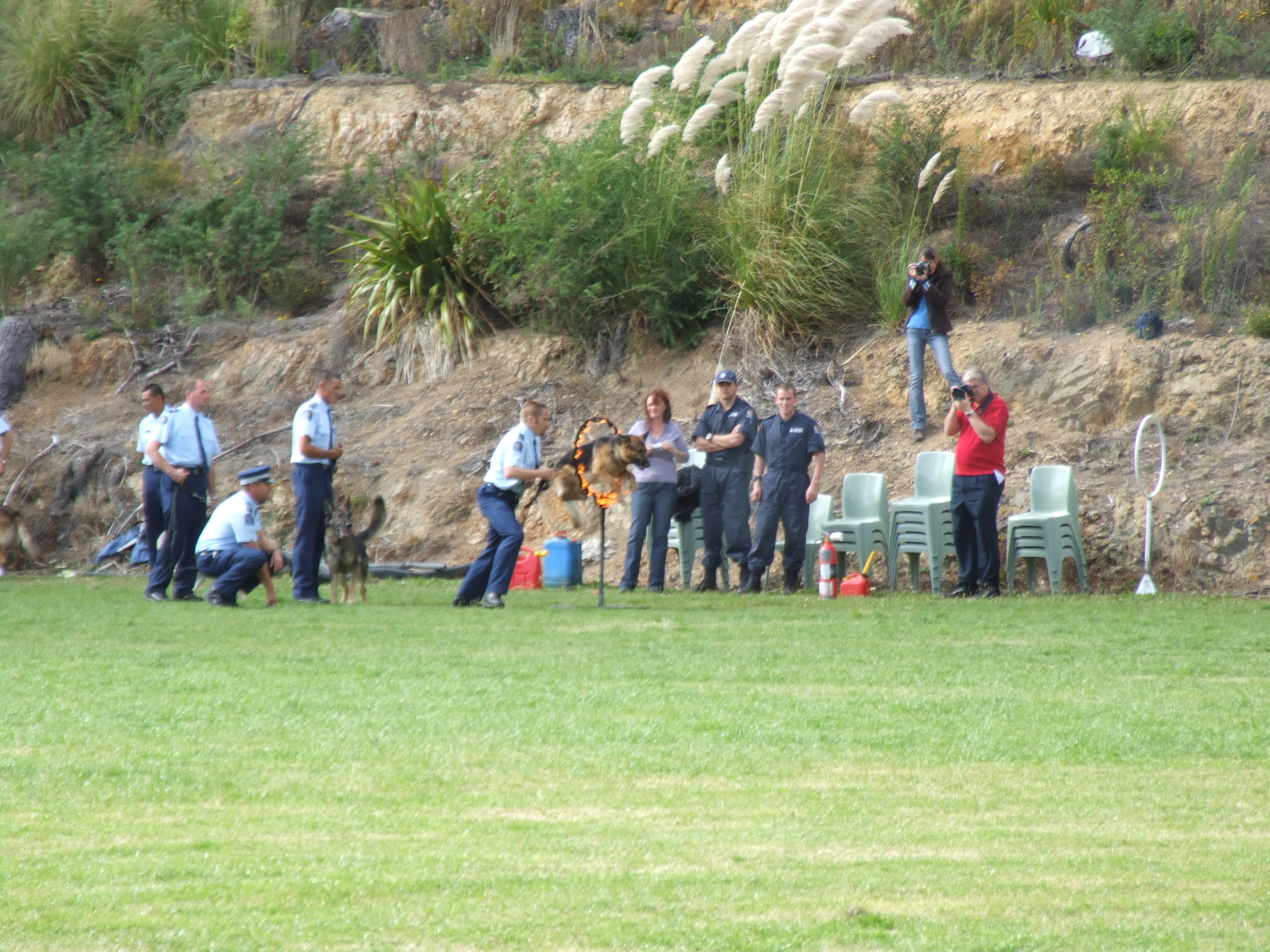
A police dog exercise at the Royal New Zealand Police College

The college was opened by Prince Charles on 1 April 1981. Prior to this, the police training facility was based next to the Trentham Military Camp in Upper Hutt. During a visit in February 1986, Queen Elizabeth II conferred the title 'Royal' on the police college.

Recruits at the college undergo a rigorous 20 week training course. There are around six intakes (called "wings") of recruits admitted each year. Wings consist of 40, 60 or 80 recruits. Trainees are taught a variety of skills relating to police vehicle use, firearms use, forensic techniques, negotiation and cultural awareness. Successful graduates become probationary constables for a period of two years.

As well as ongoing officer training, the RNZPC hosts other non-police related courses, conferences and events. The college is also home to the New Zealand Police Museum, and the Police Information & Communications Technology Service Centre (where information technology for the whole of Police is managed).

The Memorial Building at the college has a wall covered with plaques dedicated to New Zealand police officers killed by a criminal act while on duty. It was unveiled by Queen Elizabeth II in February 1986. The memorial wall is not accessible by the public or officers' families.

A police dog training centre based at Trentham is part of the Royal New Zealand Police College.

== See also ==
- New Zealand Police
