= Waihi miners' strike =

Gold miner strike in New Zealand

The Waihi miners' strike was a major strike action in 1912 by gold miners in the New Zealand town of Waihi. It is widely regarded as the most significant industrial action in the history of New Zealand's labour movement. It resulted in one striker being killed, one of only two deaths in industrial actions in New Zealand.

== Origins ==
At the time of the strike, the labour movement in New Zealand was expanding rapidly. The New Zealand Federation of Labour (known as the "Red Fed"), which was linked to the Socialist Party, was gaining considerable support from the working class, and the Waihi Trade Union of Workers, to which many miners belonged, was part of the Federation.

Disputes between the union and the large Waihi Goldmining Company were frequent. Miners had many grievances regarding their working conditions and often downed tools and walked off the site in response to accidents in the mine (falls, broken limbs, crushing, brusings and even the occasional fatality). A more insidious killer than the accidents was miners' phthisis, dust on the lungs. Because of 'miners complaint' as it was known, men who started mining at 16 would be lucky to reach 40. The company offered no compensation for miners and long before the strike (1906) there was a feeling among them that:

there were too many accidents, too many maimings, too many deaths... Miners would ask themselves bitterly what they were dying for. The answer seemed to be: for themselves, £2/8s. a week, just enough to feed and clothe their families; for the shareholders in the Waihi Gold Mining Company, a quite fabulous flow of unearned income.

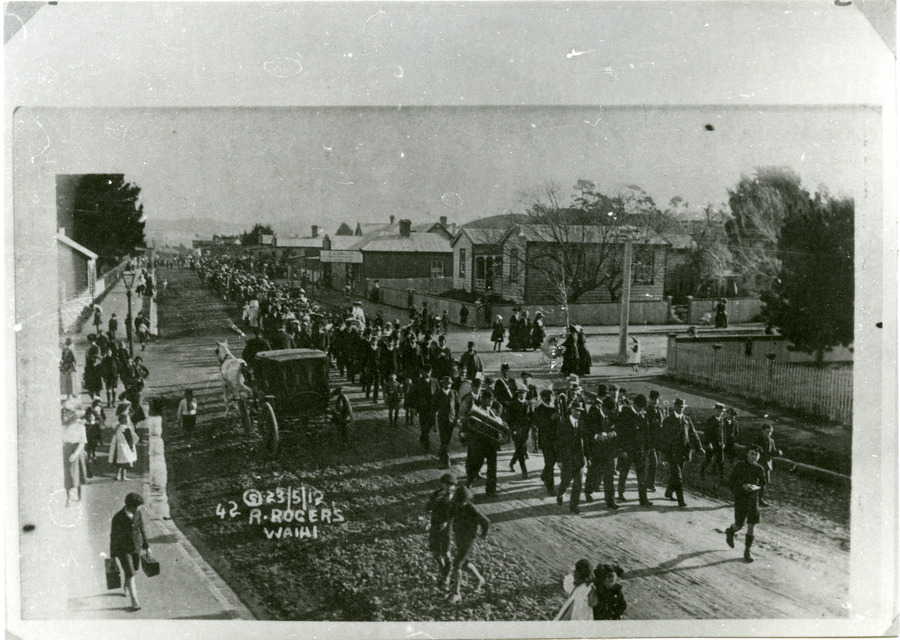
A large march of unionists and their families through Waihi, led by the union band.

In May 1912, a number of stationary engine drivers who rejected the Federation of Labour's strong positions established a breakaway union. Although the Waihi Goldmining Company claimed to have no involvement in the breakaway union and said that it was a matter of union politics, many workers believed that the Company was attempting to split the union and so they called a strike. The local police chief reacted cautiously to the action, but Police Commissioner John Cullen ordered a strong response and dispatched additional police.

Two months later, the conservative Reform Party came to power, and the new Prime Minister, William Massey, declared that he would strongly oppose the "enemies of order".

== Support from other miners ==
Several other mines around the country were affected by the action at Waihi, with miners downing tools in support of the Waihi miners or with their own claims against the harsh working conditions. At Reefton, in the South Island, this led to a lock-out of workers in June and July 1912.

== Confrontation ==
The police buildup in Waihi continued until an estimated 10 percent of New Zealand's police force was present. Around 60 strikers were arrested and jailed. Anger among the strikers grew, and the Federation of Labour gradually began to lose control to even more radical groups, such as the Industrial Workers of the World organisation.

In October, the Company was able to re-open the mine with non-union workers ("scabs"). The union workers reacted angrily, and the new workers were attacked with stones. Tensions between the union and non-union workers were very high; the union workers saw the newcomers as threatening their livelihoods and as being traitors to the working class, and many of the newcomers felt they had little choice but to take what work they could find and so they resented the attacks and condemnation.

=== Black Tuesday ===
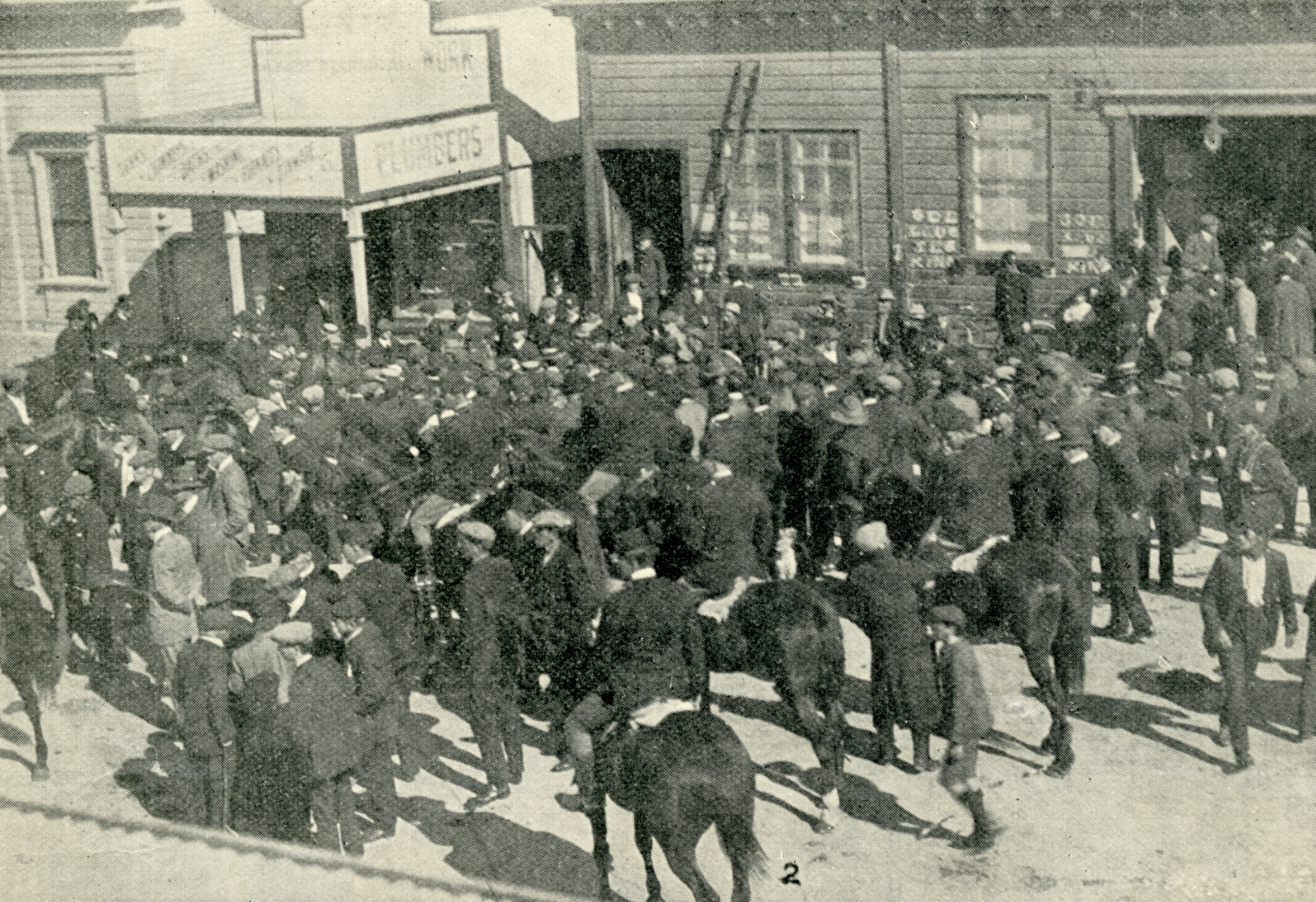
The scene outside of the Miners' Hall just after it was stormed and Evans was beaten (the Hall is on the right).

The violence gradually escalated, with union workers on one side and non-union workers and police on the other. The greatest level of violence came on 12 November, known as "Black Tuesday". A group of armed non-union workers and police attacked the union hall, which was defended by a small group of union workers (also armed). Thomas Johnston, a non-union worker who had come to the mines after his market garden in Auckland was bankrupted, was shot in the knee, and a police constable (Gerald Wade) was shot in the stomach. The shots were fired by Fred Evans, a radical unionist. Evans himself was struck by Constable Gerald Wade and later died of his injuries. Soon afterwards, the strikers broke ranks, with many fleeing Waihi altogether.

== Aftermath ==
Evans was later held by the hardliners up as a hero and a martyr, with Bob Semple saying that Evans had been "doing his duty and should have shot more of them". However, many people in the union movement actually moderated their positions after the strike; it had, after all, failed to achieve its goals. The strike also contributed to unity in the New Zealand labour movements; the Socialist Party, which had backed the strike, moved towards merger with the more moderate United Labour Party, which had not. The resultant Social Democratic Party later formed the basis of the modern Labour Party.

A pamphlet The Tragic Story of the Waihi Strike was co-written by Harry Holland, Robert Samuel Ross and Francis Edward O'Flynn (O'Flynn wrote under pseudonym Ballot Box).

The imprisoned strike leaders, including Bill Parry, were released in November against security of £1600; the bond was later found to have been put up by the brewer Ernest Davis, who was a major source of funds for the Labour Party for half a century.

== Legacy ==
In late 2016, the play 'Scarlet and Gold' told the story of the Waihi strike.

== See also ==
- Mining in New Zealand
- Scarlet & Gold a play about the Waihi miners' strike
