= Meiji University Museum =

Coordinates: 35.6987°N 139.7619°E

- Former name: Crime Museum (1929) Commercial Goods Museum (1951) Archaeology Museum (1952)
- Established: April 2004
- Location: Meiji University, Academy Common, Ground Floor 1-1 Surugadai, Kanda, Chiyoda-ku, Tokyo-to, 101-8301
- Type: Crime museum, Archaeological museum,
- Website: Official website

Meiji University Museum (Japanese: 明治大学博物館（めいじだいがくはくぶつかん）, romanized: Meiji Daigaku Hakubutsukan) is a university museum run by Meiji University. It is located in Surugadai campus, and houses a crime museum, commercial goods museum, archaeology museum, and an exhibition of the university's history.

== History ==
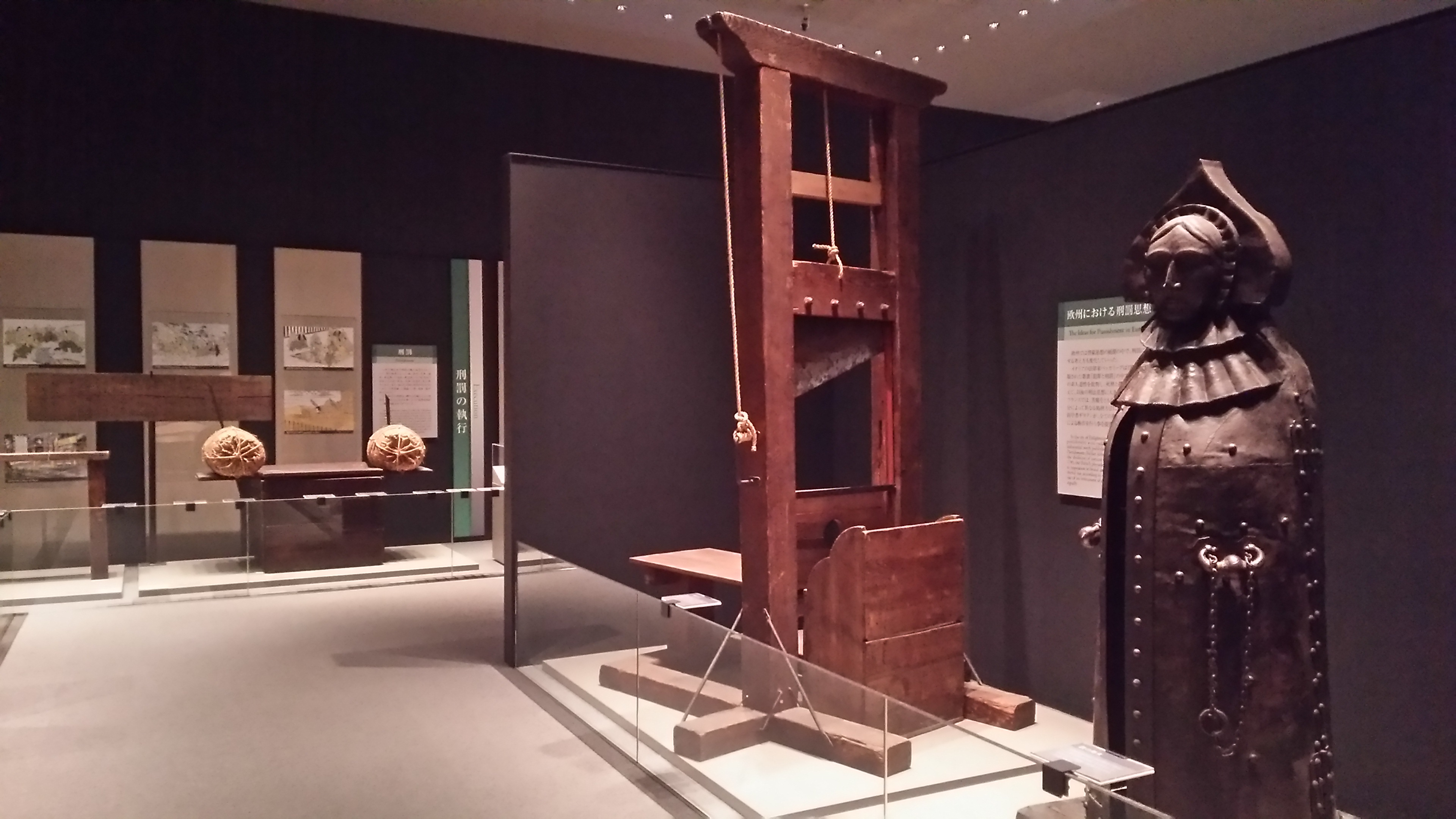
An exhibition of a guillotine and an iron maiden

Meiji University Museum opened in 2004, combining its already existing three museums: Crime Museum, Commercial Goods Museum, and Archaeology Museum.

=== Crime Museum ===
Meiji University's Crime Museum (刑事博物館), located in the old Memorial Hall, opened in 1929, and closed around the end of World War II, but reopened in 1952 to commemorate the 70th anniversary of the founding of Meiji University. It opened to the public in 1954, and was designated as a "museum-equivalent facility" (博物館相当施設) by the Museum Act. It was moved to the old Building 2, Ogawamachi Building, the old Building 1, and the University Hall. In 2004, it was merged into Meiji University Museum, and moved to Academy Common.

=== Commercial Goods Museum ===
In 1951, Commercial Goods Gallery (商品陳列館) opened in the old Building 3, and in 1957 opened to the public in the old Building 2. It was regarded as an educational facility for the School of Commerce. It was moved to Ogawamachi Building, the old Building 11, and the University Hall. It was renamed Commercial Goods Museum (商品博物館) in 2002. In 2004, it was merged into Meiji University Museum, and moved to Academy Common.

=== Archaeology Museum ===
In 1952, Archaeology Galler (考古学陳列館) opened in the old Building 2. In 1966, it was moved to the old Ogawamachi Building. On 1 April 1985, it was renamed Archaeology Museum (考古学博物館). In November 1985, it was moved to the University Hall with two other museums. In 2004, it was merged into Meiji University Museum, and moved to Academy Common.

Its exhibition includes several Important Cultural Properties: Artifacts from Iwajuku Site, Sunagawa Site, Natsushima Shell Mound, and Izuruhara Site.

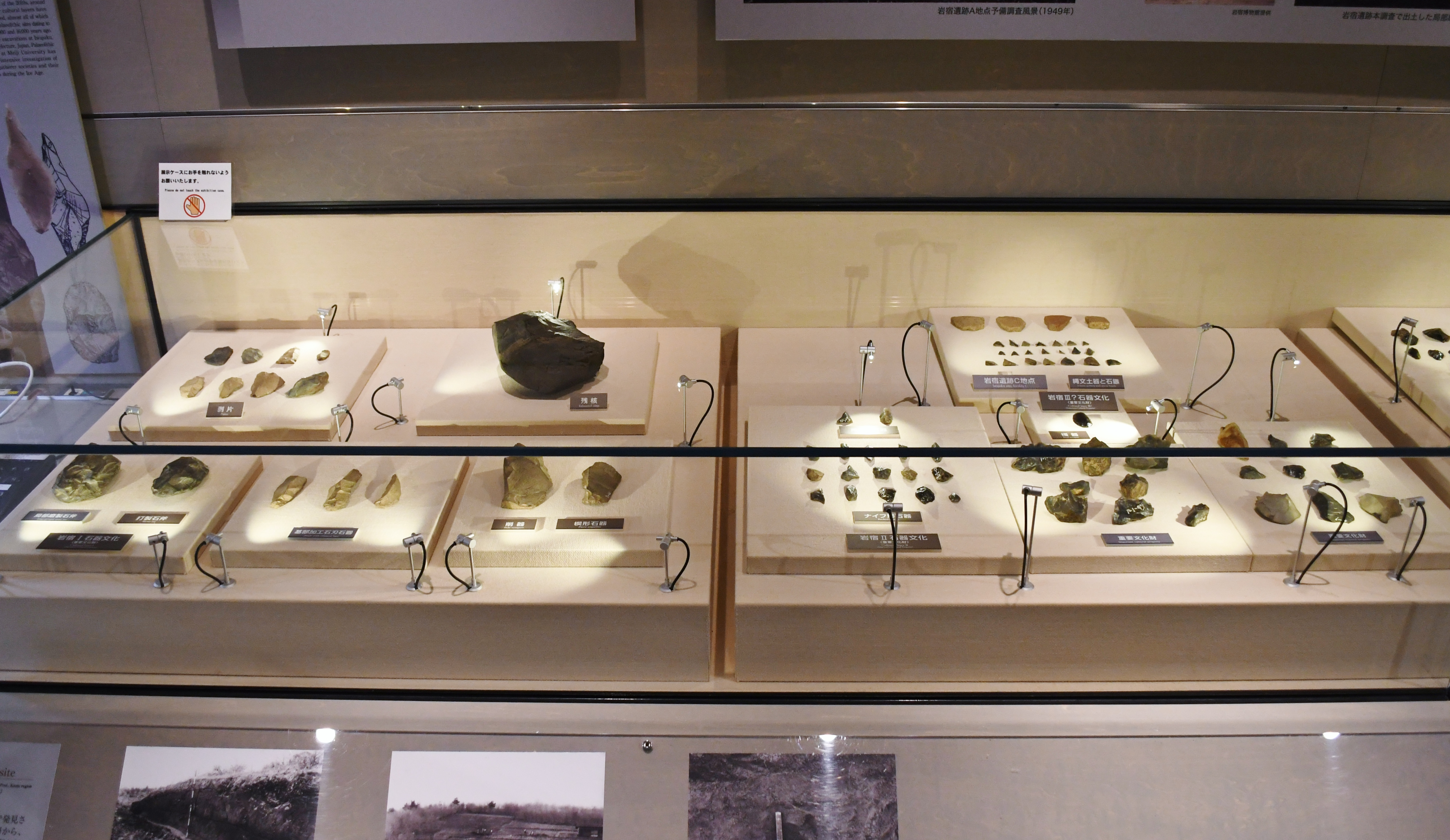
Artifacts from Iwajuku Site

=== University History Room ===
In April 2004, a permanent exhibition focusing on the history of Meiji University opened.

=== After the Opening as Meiji University Museum ===
Crime Museum, Commercial Goods Museum, and Archaeology Museum were merged into Meiji University Museum, and it opened in April 2004. From the opening in April 2004 to August 2013, it received 600,000 visitors, and over 74,000 people visited the museum annually. It houses the office of the Musiological Society of Japan, and hosted the first "University Museum Meeting" in 2009. In March 2016, it renewed its permanent exhibition.
