= Fürth Crime Museum =

Museum in Bavaria, Germany

Coordinates: 49°28′37″N 10°59′20″E

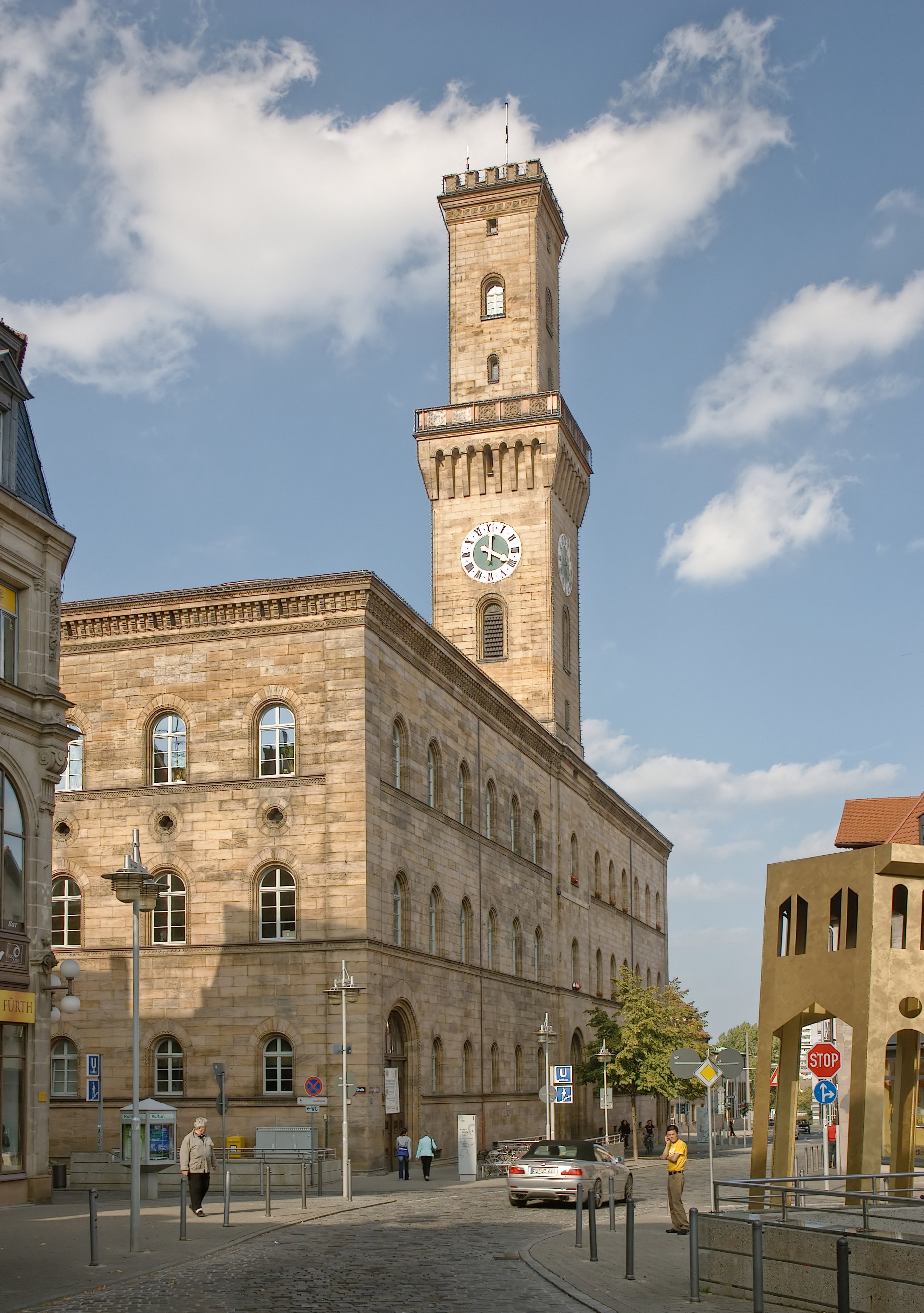
Fürth's Rathaus - the gate at the front corner is the entrance to the Crime Museum

The Fürth Crime Museum (German: Kriminalmuseum Fürth) is a museum on crime and policing in the city of Fürth in Bavaria, Germany.

The museum covers the period from the 19th century, starting with the establishment of the commission on policing and justice by Karl August von Hardenberg and the police of the Kingdom of Bavaria. The museum opened on 22 September 2010 in the former courtroom of the town's Rathaus or town hall.
