= New Zealand Police Museum =

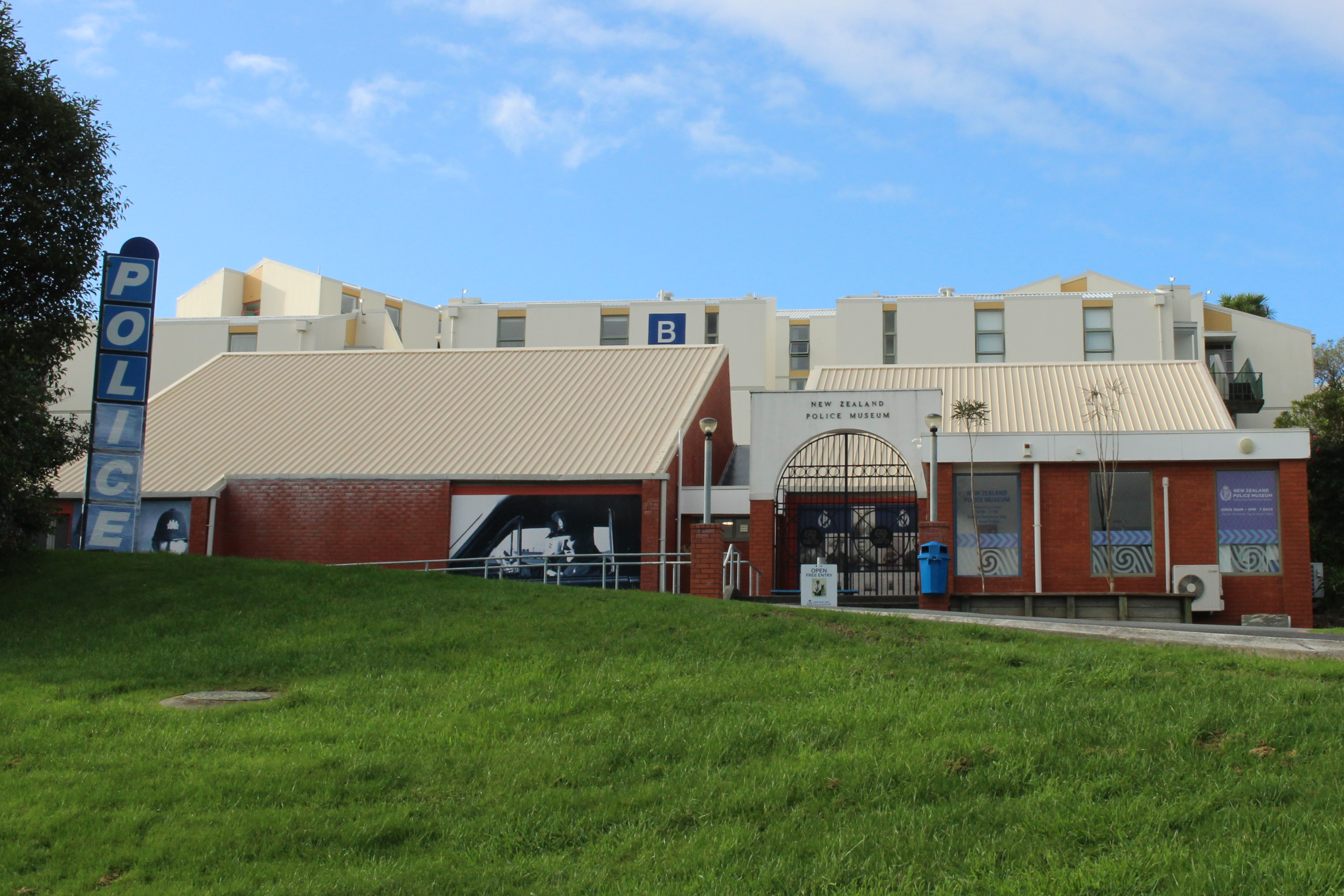
- New Zealand Police Museum in 2025
- Established: 1908
- Location: Porirua, New Zealand
- Type: Police museum
- Director: Rowan Carroll
- Website: www.police.govt.nz/about-us/history-museum/museum

The New Zealand Police Museum is a museum of the New Zealand Police that is located on the campus of the Royal New Zealand Police College. It was started in 1908 and made accessible to the public in 1996.

== History ==
The New Zealand Police Museum was started in 1908 and was modelled after the Black Museum in Scotland Yard, now known as the Crime Museum. In 1996 the collection was made accessible to the public.

== Collection ==
The museum has various collections, including weapons, mugshots, and old police cars, such as a 1919 Ford Model TT, and a 1988 Mitsubishi V3000. It also has the George Medal of Eva Helen Dickson, who was the first woman to receive the medal.

For about six months in 2012 the museum featured an exhibition to remember Gerald Wade, a police officer who was shot 100 years prior in the 1912 Waihi miners' strike.
